= Military Police of Rio de Janeiro State =

Military police force of the state of Rio de Janeiro

Military Police of Rio de Janeiro State Polícia Militar do Estado do Rio de Janeiro
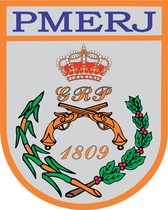
- Blazon of the Military Police of Rio de Janeiro State

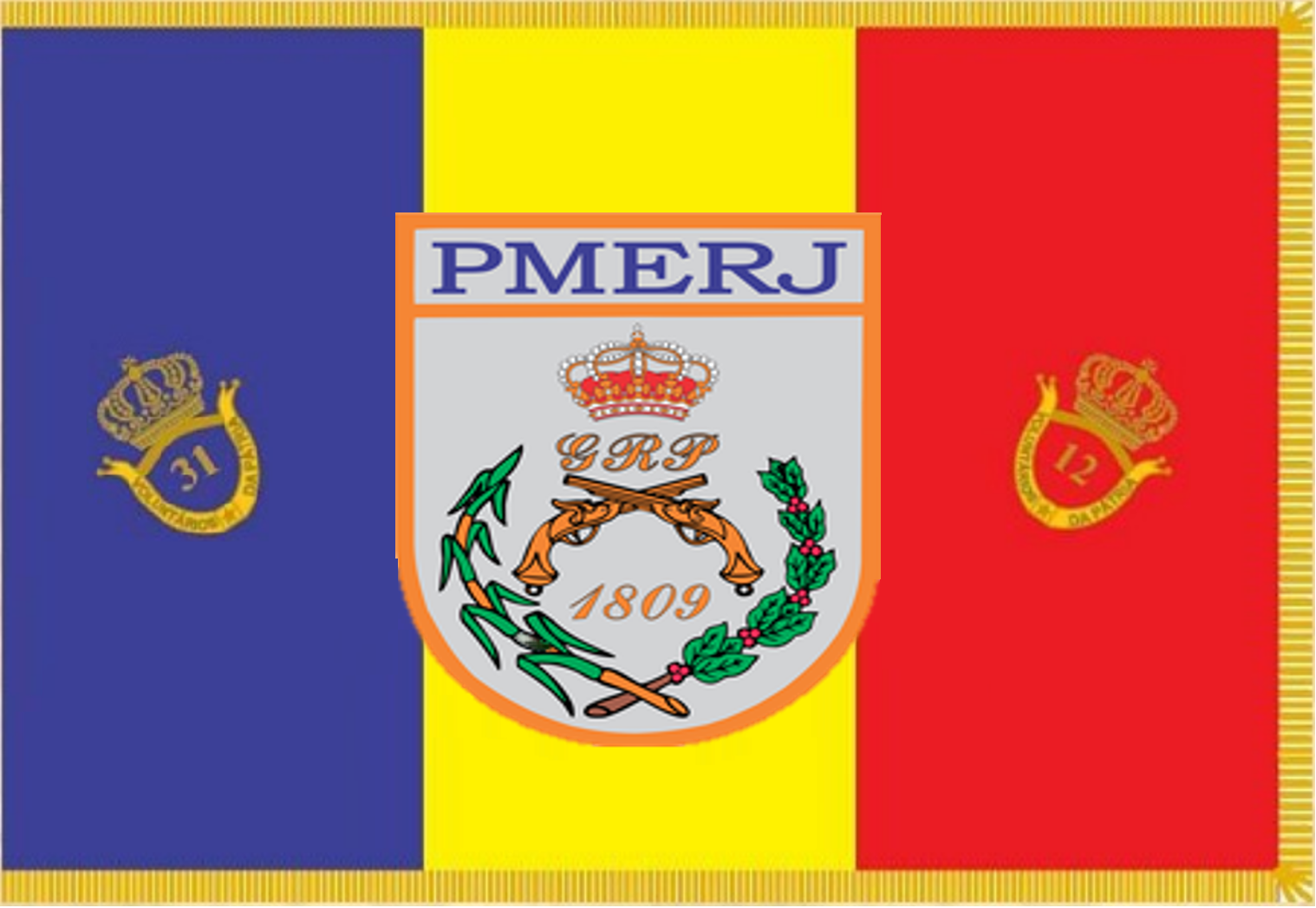
- Flag of Military Police of Rio de Janeiro State

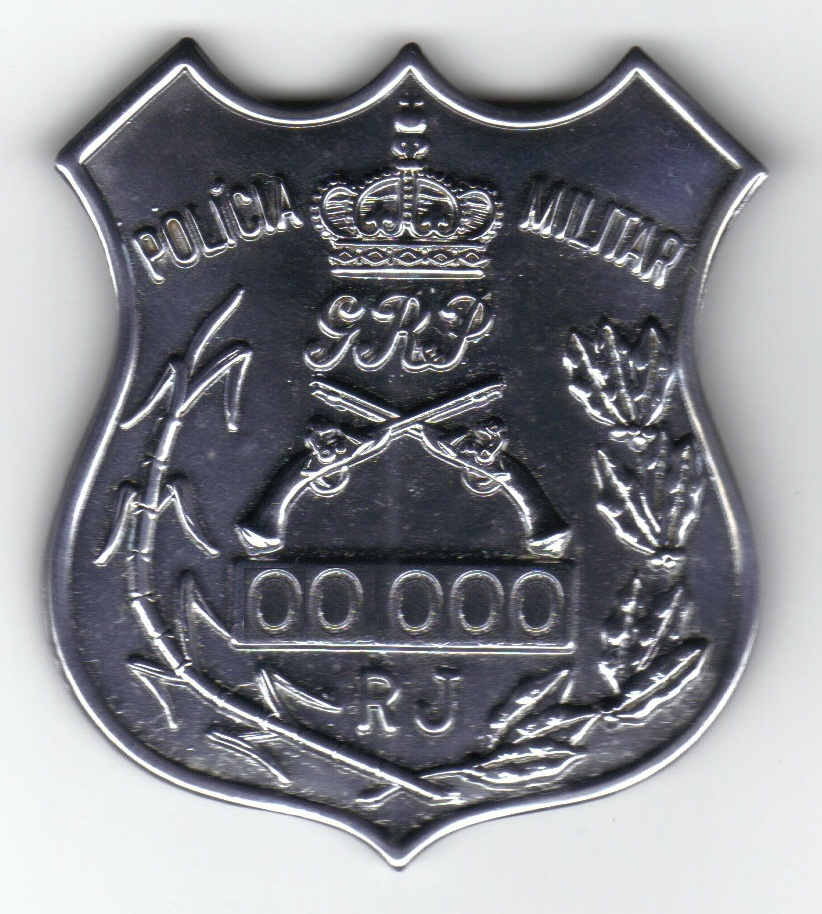
- Badge of the Military Police of Rio de Janeiro State
- Abbreviation: PMERJ
- Motto: To serve and protect Servir e proteger

Agency overview
- Formed: May 13, 1809
- Employees: 45,000 (2018)

Jurisdictional structure
- Operations jurisdiction: Rio de Janeiro, Brazil
- Map of police jurisdiction.
- Area: 43,696.054 km^{2} (16,871.141 sq mi)
- Population: 16,010,429 (2009)
- Constituting instrument: Article 42 of Constitution of Brazil
- General nature: Gendarmerie

Operational structure
- Headquarters: City of Rio de Janeiro

Website
- www.policiamilitar.rj.gov.br portuguese

The Military Police of Rio de Janeiro State (Portuguese: Polícia Militar do Estado do Rio de Janeiro, PMERJ) is the military police force of the Brazilian state of Rio de Janeiro. It is a reserve and ancillary force of the Brazilian Army, and part of the System of Public Security and Brazilian Social Protection. Its members are called "state military" personnel.

The primary mission of PMERJ is ostensively preventive policing for the maintenance of public order in the State of Rio de Janeiro.

== History ==
The first militarized police in Portugal (when Brazil was still a colony) was the Royal Police Guard of Lisbon (Portuguese: Guarda Real de Polícia de Lisboa), established in 1801, which followed the model of the National Gendarmerie (French: Gendarmerie Nationale) of France, created in 1791.

When the Portuguese Royal Family was transferred to Brazil, the Royal Police Guard of Lisbon remained in Portugal, and another equivalent unit was created in Rio de Janeiro under the name of Military Division of the Royal Police Guard of Rio de Janeiro, in 1809.

With the abdication of Emperor Pedro I in 1831, the Regency restructured the Brazilian Armed Forces.

After its soldiers rioted, the Royal Police Guard of Rio de Janeiro was dissolved, and was replaced by the Permanent Municipal Guard Corps, a branch of the Army.

Another security force similar to the French National Guard was also created. The same law allowed each Province to establish its own Guard of Volunteers.

In 1834, Pedro I died in Portugal and this reduced the fear in Brazil of a reunification of the kingdoms. In the province of Rio de Janeiro (surrounding the royal court in the Neutral Municipality) the Provincial Police Corps was established, with professional troops.

The Police Corps were created with the same structure as the Imperial Brazilian Army, and to serve as reserve troops when necessary, under the provincial presidents' control.

In 1835, the president of Rio de Janeiro province created the Rio de Janeiro Province Police Guard (Guarda Policial da Província do Rio de Janeiro).

With the proclamation of the Republic, Brazil adopted a constitution based on the United States, where the states had a large autonomy. The Police Corps were renamed Public Forces (Força Pública) and began to be administered by the state governors, with some becoming de facto small armies, with infantry, cavalry, artillery, and later, even their own air branches.

This became a threat to the national army and remained until the rise of Getúlio Vargas's dictatorial government in the 1930s, when he abolished states autonomy, after Constitutionalist Revolution and Estado Novo coup, with the Brazilian army beginning its control over states military polices and military firefighters corps - including the then Federal District Military Police, which served the city of Rio de Janeiro during its days as the national capital - until 1960 -, alongside the Military Police of Rio de Janeiro State, which was separated from the city, until both organizations were merged, in 1975.

== Attributions and mission ==
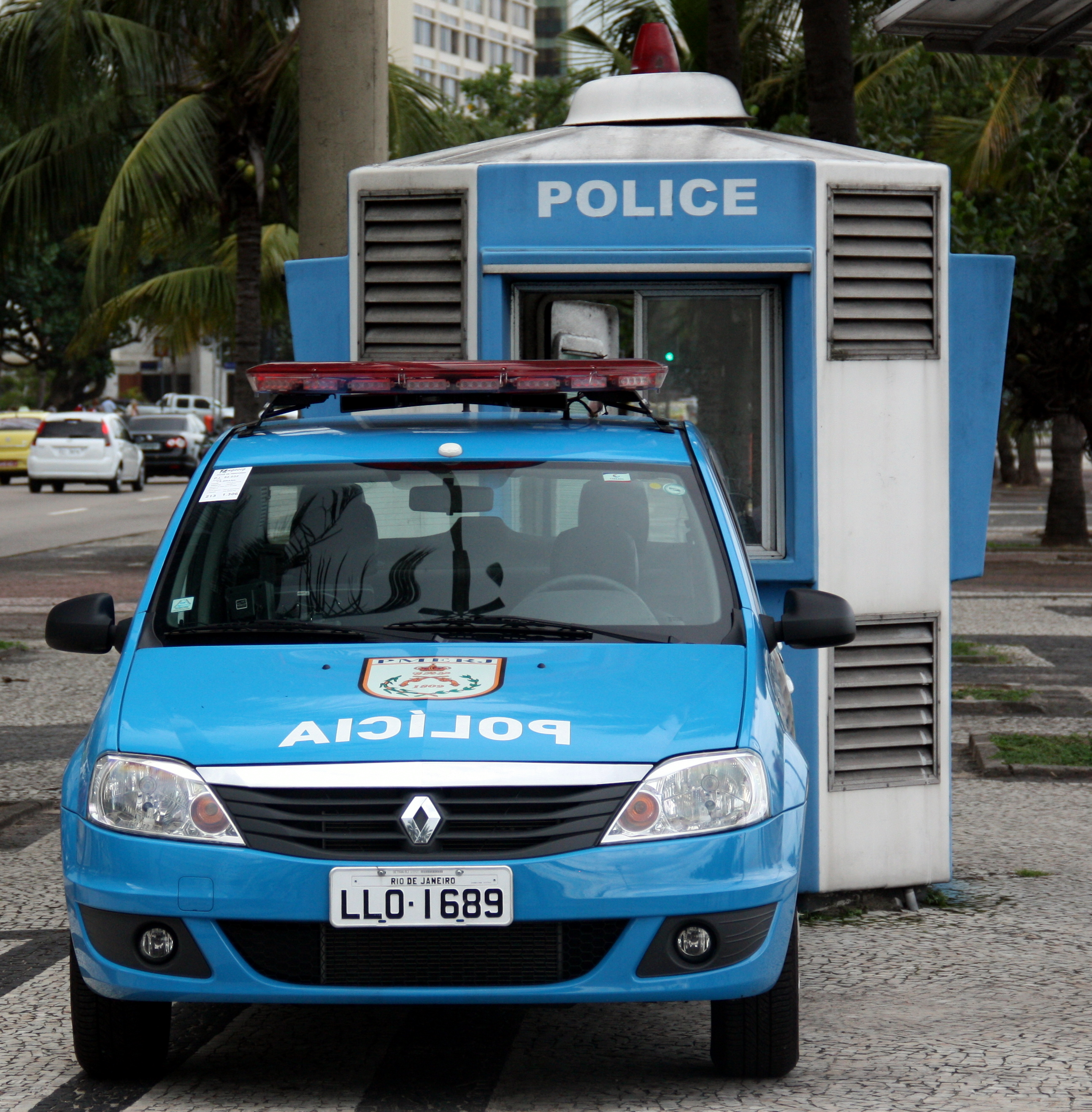
Renault Logan in front of Rio de Janeiro Military Police box.

The constitutional attributions of the Military Police of Rio de Janeiro State (PMERJ) are provided for in § 5 of Article 144 of the Constitution, "the military police responsible for the ostensive policing and the maintenance of public order".

In addition:

- In the fight against organized crime, through operations to catch criminals or seizure of weapons, drugs or contraband.
- Providing direct services to the population, helping to transport patients, the orientation of people in difficulty, the intervention of domestic disputes, the routing of the poor to the agencies responsible for sanitation problems, housing
- In specialized policing in tourist areas, stadiums, major events and festivals.
- The supervision and control of the vehicle fleet in integrated actions with other public agencies.
- The preservation of flora, fauna and the environment through specialized battalion.
- In the security service forums of Justice in municipalities throughout the state.
- In support of court officers in repossession cases and other court orders with risk.
- The security of the executive authorities, the legislature and the judiciary.
- Security of witnesses and people under threat.
- In support of public, state and municipal agencies in activities such actions with the population of street and dealing with children and adolescents at social risk.

== Organization ==
The PMERJ is operationally organized into Intermediary Commands or Policing Area Command (Portuguese: Comandos Intermediários/Comandos de Policiamento de Área), battalions, companies, platoons and detachments; administratively, in untersecretariats, . Independent companies police sizable towns. The battalions are based in major urban centers, and their companies and platoons are distributed according to population density in cities. The Military Police of Rio de Janeiro is present in all cities of the State.

=== Operational Commands and Battalions ===
These are the Policing Area Commands, other operational commands and their respective battalions, that works under the Untersecretary of Operation Management (except the Proximity Police Command, that works under the Untersecretary of Strategic Programs) Regular battalions are also known by the Portuguese acronym BPM - Military Police Battalion (Portuguese: Batalhão de Polícia Militar). Cities and neighborhoods indicate the location of their headquarters. If it is in italics, the battalion is currently being activated; the battalion from which it was separated is indicated in parentheses.

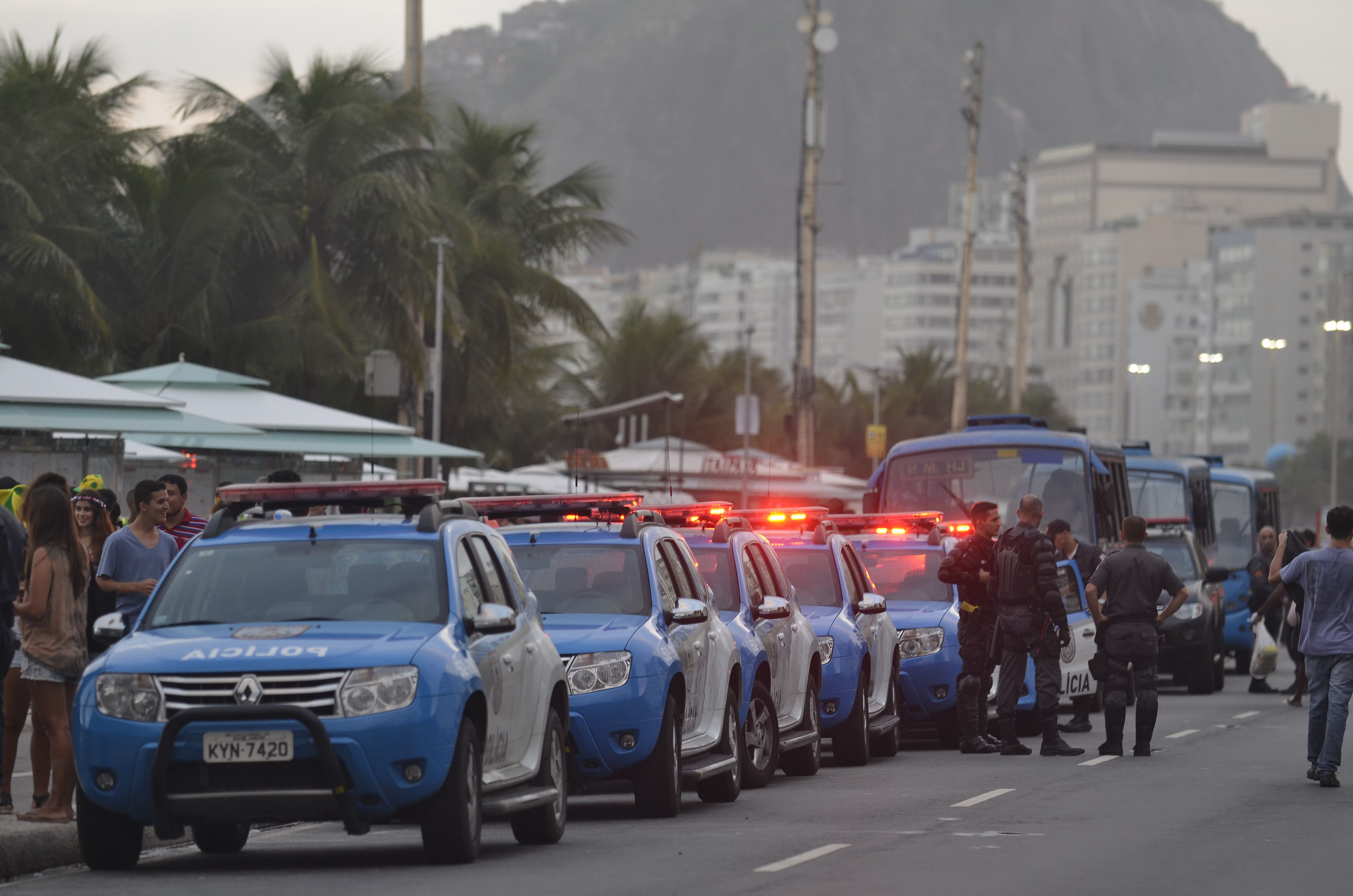
Police cruisers in Copacabana beach.

- 1st Policing Area Command – city of Rio de Janeiro – Central, South and North (part) Zones of the city
  - 2nd Battalion – Botafogo – Neighborhoods of Glória, Catete, Laranjeiras, Cosme Velho, Humaitá, Flamengo, Botafogo and Urca
  - 3rd Battalion – Méier – Neighborhoods of Méier, Engenho de Dentro, Cachambi, Del Castilho, Maria da Graça, Água Santa, Todos os Santos, Abolição, Pilares, Inhaúma, Engenho da Rainha, Piedade, Tomás Coelho, Encantado and Lins de Vasconcelos,
  - 4th Battalion – São Cristovão – Neighborhoods of São Cristóvão, Caju, Mangueira, Estácio, Rio Comprido, Cidade Nova, Centro (part), Tijuca (part), Praça da Bandeira, Maracanã, Benfica (part) and Vasco da Gama
  - 5th Battalion – Saúde – Neighborhoods of Centro (part), Saúde, Gamboa, Santo Cristo, Lapa, Santa Teresa and Paquetá Island
  - 6th Battalion – Tijuca – Neighborhoods of Tijuca (part), Grajaú, Vila Isabel and Alto da Boa Vista (part)
  - 13th Battalion (3rd BPM) – Neighborhoods of Engenho Novo, Riachuelo, Rocha, Sampaio, Jacaré, Jacarezinho and São Francisco Xavier
  - 16th Battalion – Olaria – Neighborhoods of Olaria, Penha, Penha Circular, Parada de Lucas, Vigário Geral, Jardim América, Brás de Pina and Cordovil
  - 17th Battalion – Ilha do Governador – Neighborhoods of Ilha do Governador and Cidade Universitária
  - 19th Battalion – Copacabana – Neighborhoods of Copacabana and Leme
  - 22nd Battalion – Maré – Neighborhoods of Maré, Benfica (part), Bonsucesso, Ramos, Manguinhos and Higienópolis
  - 23rd Battalion – Leblon – Neighborhoods of Leblon, Ipanema, São Conrado, Gávea, Jardim Botânico and Alto da Boa Vista (part)

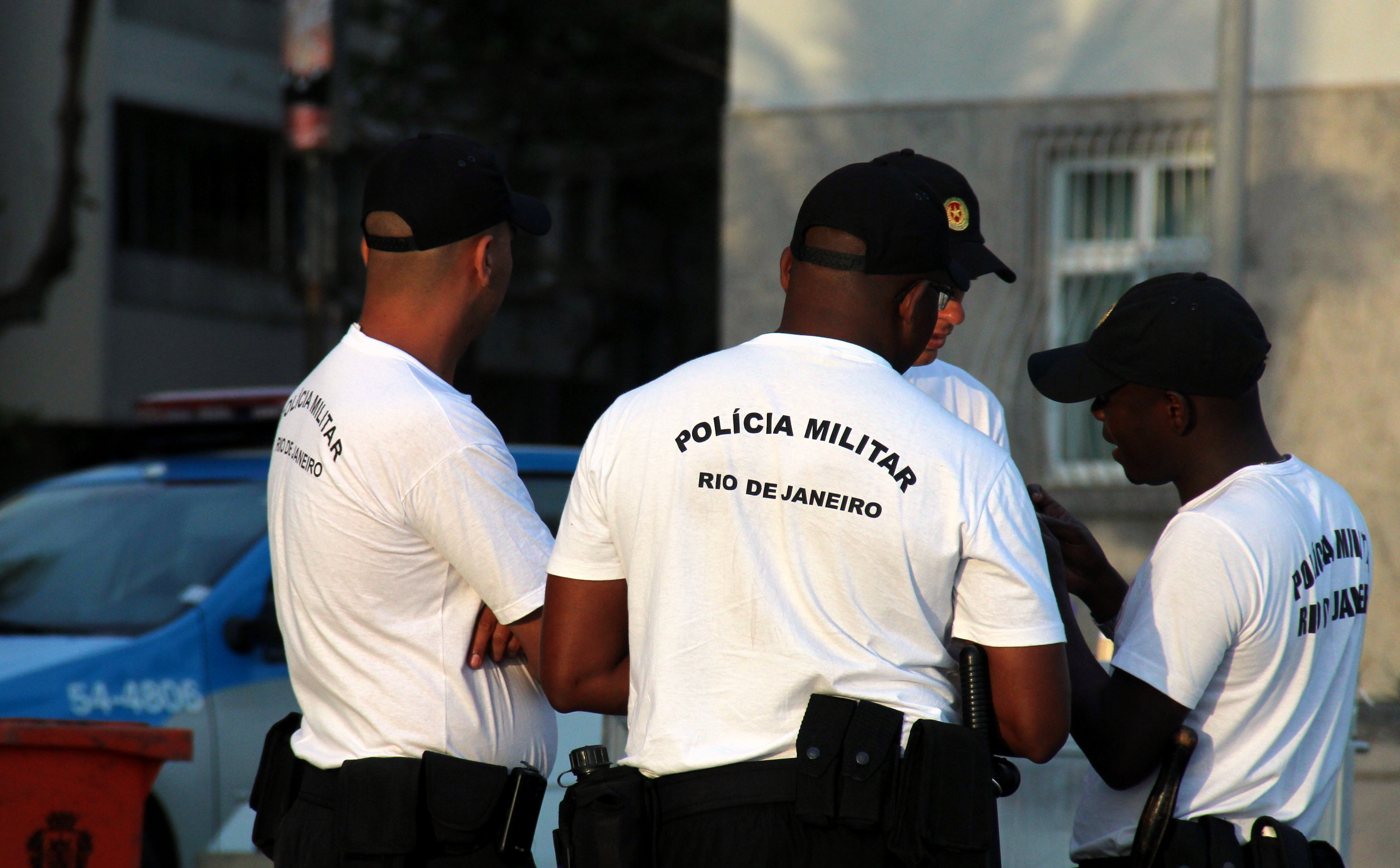
Rio de Janeiro Police officers in beach patrol.

- 2nd Policing Area Command – city of Rio de Janeiro – North (part), Southwest and West Zones of the city
  - 9th Battalion – Rocha Miranda – Neighborhoods of Rocha Miranda, Oswaldo Cruz, Bento Ribeiro, Marechal Hermes, Campinho, Praça Seca, Cascadura, Coelho Neto, Cavalcanti, Fazenda Botafogo, Honório Gurgel, Colégio (part), Quintino Bocaiúva, Madureira, Vaz Lobo, Turiaçu and Engenheiro Leal;
  - 14th Battalion – Bangu – Neighborhoods of Bangu, Santíssimo (part), Senador Camará, Gericinó, Padre Miguel, Realengo, Magalhães Bastos, Jardim Sulacap, Vila Militar and Deodoro
  - 18th Battalion – Freguesia – Neighborhoods of Freguesia, Jacarepaguá, Tanque, Vila Valqueire, Taquara, Curicica, Cidade de Deus, Anil and Gardênia Azul
  - 27th Battalion – Santa Cruz – Neighborhoods of Santa Cruz, Paciência, Sepetiba, Guaratiba and Pedra de Guaratiba
  - 31st Battalion – Barra da Tijuca – Neighborhoods of Recreio dos Bandeirantes, Grumari, Vargem Grande, Vargem Pequena, Camorim and Barra de Guaratiba
  - 40th Battalion – Campo Grande – Neighborhoods of Campo Grande, Santíssimo (part), Senador Vasconcelos, Inhoaíba and Cosmos;
  - 41st Battalion – Irajá – Neighborhoods of Irajá, Colégio (part), Vista Alegre, Vila da Penha, Vicente de Carvalho, Vila Kosmos, Guadalupe, Ricardo de Albuquerque, Anchieta, Parque Anchieta, Pavuna, Costa Barros, Barros Filho, Parque Colúmbia and Acari;
  - 47th Battalion (31th BPM) – Neighborhoods of Barra da Tijuca, Itanhangá and Joá
- 3rd Policing Area Command – city of Duque de Caxias – Baixada Fluminense Region
  - 15th Battalion – city of Duque de Caxias
  - 20th Battalion – city of Mesquita – cities of Mesquita and Nilópolis
  - 21st Battalion – city of São João de Meriti
  - 24th Battalion – city of Queimados – cities of Queimados, Japeri, Paracambi and Seropédica
  - 34th Battalion – city of Magé – cities of Magé and Guapimirim
  - 39th Battalion – city of Belford Roxo
  - 44th Battalion (20th BPM) – city of Nova Iguaçu
  - 4th Independent Company – city of Itaguaí
- 4th Policing Area Command – city of Niterói – eastern part of Greater Rio de Janeiro
  - 1st Battalion – city of São Gonçalo;
  - 7th Battalion – city of São Gonçalo;
  - 12th Battalion – city of Niterói
  - 35th Battalion – city of Itaboraí – cities of Itaboraí, Rio Bonito, Silva Jardim and Tanguá;
- 5th Policing Area Command – city of Volta Redonda – South Region
  - 10th Battalion – city of Barra do Piraí – Cities of Barra do Piraí, Paty do Alferes, Valença, Rio das Flores, Vassouras, Engenheiro Paulo de Frontin, Mendes and Piraí;
  - 28th Battalion – city of Volta Redonda – cities of Volta Redonda, Pinheiral and Rio Claro;
  - 33rd Battalion – city of Angra dos Reis – cities of Angra dos Reis and Mangaratiba;
  - 37th Battalion – city of Resende – cities of Resende, Itatiaia, Porto Real and Quatis;
  - 2nd Independent Company – city of Paraty;
  - 3rd Independent Company – city of Barra Mansa;
- 6th Policing Area Command – city of Campos dos Goytacazes – North (part) and Northwestern Region
  - 8th Battalion – city of Campos dos Goytacazes – Cities of Campos dos Goytacazes, São Fidélis and São João da Barra;
  - 29th Battalion – city of Itaperuna – cities of Italva, Bom Jesus do Itabapoana, Cardoso Moreira, Laje do Muriaé, Porciúncula, Natividade, Varre-Sai and São José de Ubá;
  - 36th Battalion – city of Santo Antônio de Pádua – cities of Santo Antônio de Pádua, Miracema, Aperibé, Itaocara, Cambuci and São Sebastião do Alto;
  - 46th Battalion (8th BPM) – city of Campos dos Goytacazes – Cities of Campos dos Goytacazes (Guarus and districts of Santa Maria, Morro do Coco, Santo Eduardo, Travessão e Vila Nova de Campos) and São Francisco de Itabapoana

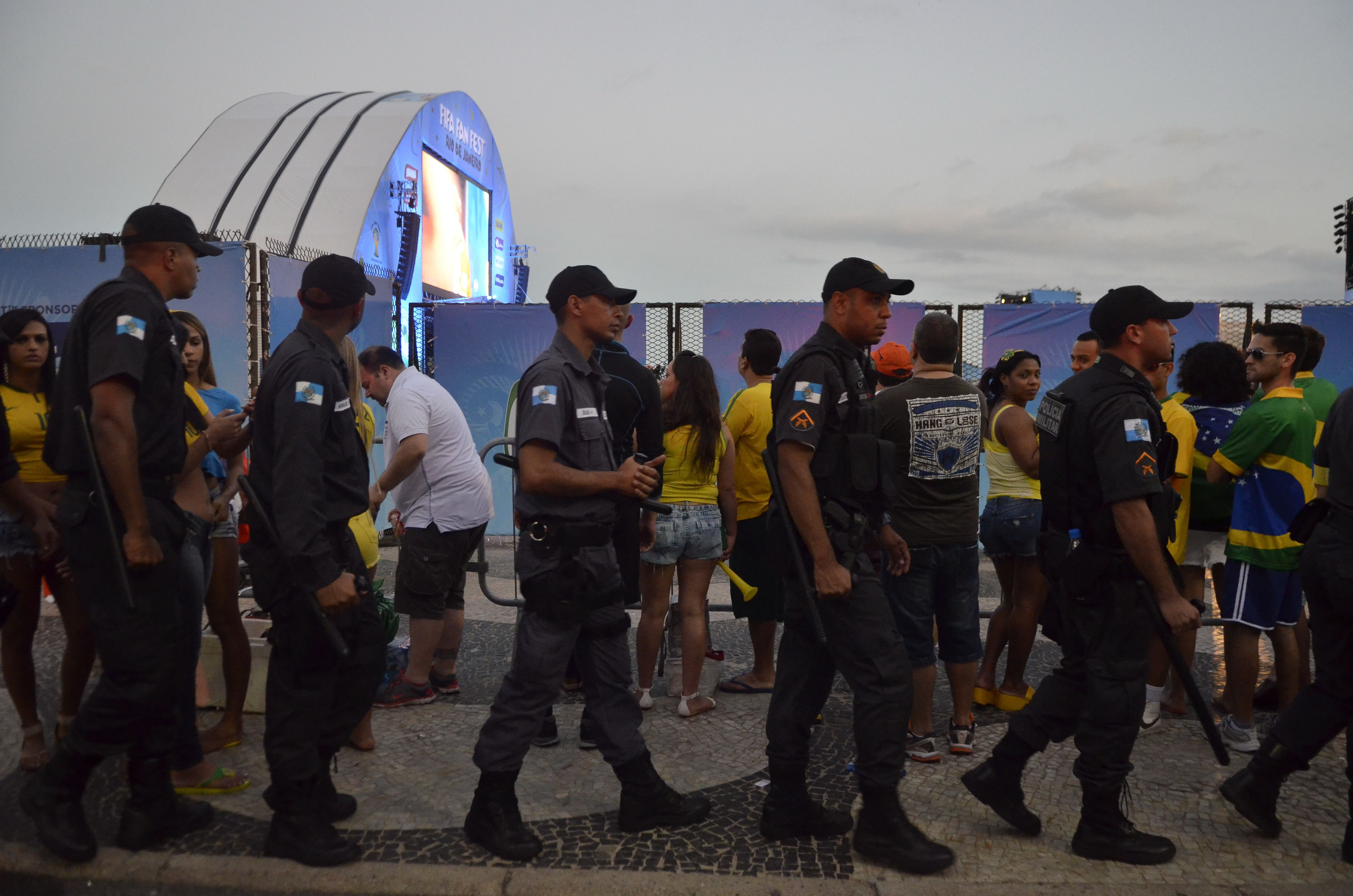
Group of police (PMERJ) conducting patrols during an event on the Copacabana beach

- 7th Policing Area Command – city of Petrópolis – Serrana Region
  - 11th Battalion – city of Nova Friburgo – cities of Nova Friburgo, Bom Jardim, Duas Barras, Cantagalo, Cordeiro, Cachoeira de Macacu, Santa Maria Madalena, Trajano de Moraes, São Sebastião do Alto and Macuco
  - 26th Battalion – city of Petrópolis
  - 30th Battalion – city of Teresópolis – cities of Teresópolis, São José do Vale do Rio Preto, Sumidouro and Carmo
  - 38th Battalion – city of Três Rios – cities of Três Rios, Paraíba do Sul, Sapucaia, Areal and Comendador Levy Gasparian
- 8th Policing Area Command – city of Cabo Frio – North (part) and Lagos regions
  - 25th Battalion – city of Cabo Frio – cities of Cabo Frio, Armação dos Búzios, São Pedro da Aldeia and Arraial do Cabo
  - 32nd Battalion – city of Macaé – cities of Macaé, Casimiro de Abreu, Conceição de Macabu, Quissamã, Carapebus and Rio das Ostras
  - 42nd Battalion – city of Araruama – cities of Araruama, Iguaba Grande and Saquarema
  - 45th Battalion (12th BPM) – city of Maricá
- Special Operations Command – city of Rio de Janeiro
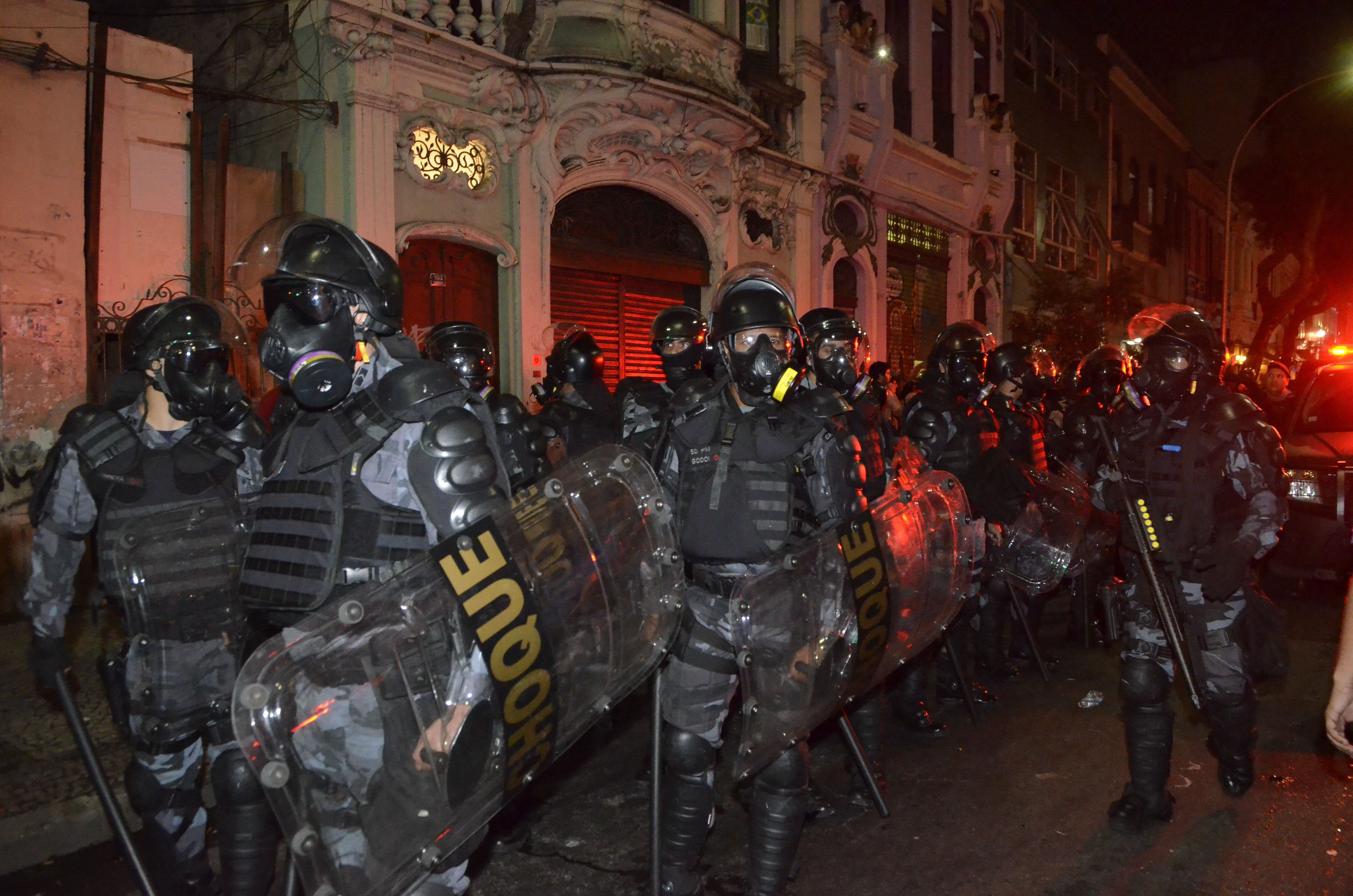
  Riot control police units in action, 2014.
  - Special Police Operations Battalion
  - Police Operations with Dogs battalion (K-9 Unit);
  - Shock Police Battalion (Riot Control, tactical intervention and escort);
  - Police Aviation unit – based in Niterói;
  - Tactical Motorcycle Battalion;
  - Center for Specialized Instruction and Police Research
- Specialized Policing Command – city of Niterói – All units are based in Rio de Janeiro
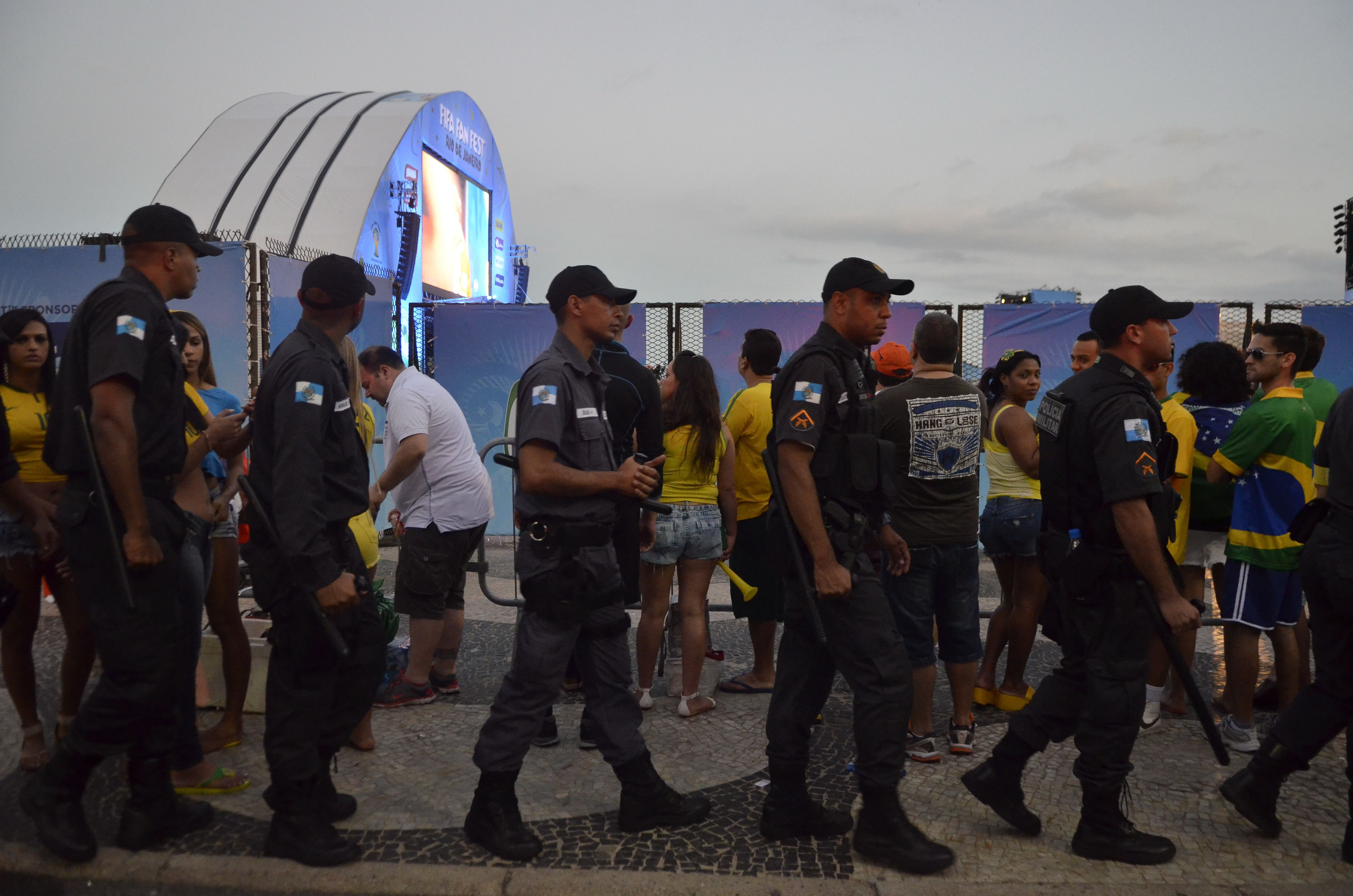
  Police (PMERJ) conducting patrols during an event on the Copacabana beach
  - Mounted Police Regiment;
  - Specialized Patrol and Crowd Control Battalion (riot control and tactical policing);
  - Specialized Stadium Policing Battalion – in Deodoro;
  - Tourist Police Battalion – in Copacabana;
  - Expressways Policing Battalion (Avenida Brasil, Linha Amarela, Linha Vermelha and Transolímpica);
  - Railway Policing Groupment;
  - 1st Independent Company (Governor's Palace Guard) – Laranjeiras Palace
- Environmental Policing Command – São Gonçalo
  - 1st Environmental Police Battalion – São Gonçalo – cities of Areal, Belford Roxo, Bom Jardim, Cachoeiras de Macacu, Carmo, Comendador Levy Gasparian, Cordeiro, Duas Barras, Duque de Caxias, Guapimirim, Itaboraí, Japeri, Magé, Maricá, Mesquita, Nilópolis, Niterói, Nova Friburgo, Nova Iguaçu, Paraíba do Sul, Petrópolis, Queimados, Rio Bonito, Rio de Janeiro, São Gonçalo, São João de Meriti, São José do Vale do Rio Preto, Sapucaia, Saquarema, Seropédica, Silva Jardim, Sumidouro, Tanguá, Teresópolis and Três Rios;
  - 2nd Environmental Police Battalion – Volta Redonda – cities of Angra dos Reis, Barra do Piraí, Barra Mansa, Engenheiro Paulo de Frontim, Itaguaí, Itatiaia, Mangaratiba, Mendes, Miguel Pereira, Paracambi, Paraty, Paty do Alferes, Pinheiral, Piraí, Porto Real, Quatis, Resende, Rio Claro, Rio das Flores, Valença, Vassouras and Volta Redonda;
  - 3rd Environmental Police Battalion – São João da Barra – cities of Aperibé, Araruama, Armação de Búzios, Arraial do Cabo, Bom Jesus do Itabapoana, Cabo Frio, Cambuci, Campos dos Goytacazes, Cantagalo, Carapebus, Cardoso Moreira, Casimiro de Abreu, Conceição de Macabu, Iguaba Grande, Italva, Itaocara, Itaperuna, Laje do Muriaé, Macaé, Macuco, Miracema, Natividade, Porciúncula, Quissamã, Rio das Ostras, Santa Maria Madalena, Santo Antônio de Pádua, São Fidélis, São Francisco de Itabapoana, São João da Barra, São José de Ubá, São Pedro da Aldeia, São Sebastião do Alto, Trajano de Moraes and Varre-Sai
  - Maritime and Riverine Group
- Traffic Police Command – city of Niterói
  - 1st Highway Police Battalion – city of Niterói – state highways in the cities of Niterói, São Gonçalo, Maricá, Itaboraí, Guapimirim, Cachoeiras de Macacu, Rio Bonito, Tanguá, Saquarema, Silva Jardim, Araruama, Iguaba Grande, Arraial do Cabo, São Pedro da Aldeia, Cabo Frio, Armação de Búzios, Rio de Janeiro, Nilópolis, São João de Meriti, Duque de Caxias, Petrópolis, Nova Iguaçu, Mesquita, Queimados, Japeri, Itaguaí, Seropédica, Paracambi, Miguel Pereira, Engenheiro Paulo de Frontin, Mendes, Piraí, Pinheiral, Rio Claro, Mangaratiba, Angra dos Reis, Paraty, Areal, Três Rios, Paraíba do Sul, Comendador Levy Gasparian, Paty do Alferes, Rio das Flores, Vassouras, Valença, Barra do Piraí, Volta Redonda, Barra Mansa, Quatis, Porto Real, Resende and Itatiaia;
  - 2nd Highway Police Battalion – city of Macaé – state highways in the cities of Casimiro de Abreu, Rio das Ostras, Macaé, Conceição de Macabu, Sta. Maria Madalena, Carapebus, Quissamã, Campos dos Goytacazes, São João da Barra, São Francisco do Itabapoana, Cardoso Moreira, Teresópolis, São J. do Vale do Rio Preto, Sapucaia, Sumidouro, Carmo, Duas Barras, Bom Jardim, Nova Friburgo, Trajano de Moraes, Cordeiro, Macuco, Cantagalo, São Sebastião do Alto, Itaocara, São Fidelis, Aperibé, Cambuci, Sto. Antônio de Pádua, Miracema, São José de Ubá, Lages do Muriaé, Itaperuna, Italva, Bom Jesus do Itabapoana, Natividade, Porciúncula and Varre Sai;
  - Traffic Police Battalion
- Proximity Police Command – city of Rio de Janeiro – favelas of Rio de Janeiro city
  - 1st Proximity Policing Unit/2nd BPM – Santa Marta,
  - 2nd Proximity Policing Unit/5th BPM – Providência
  - 3rd Proximity Policing Unit/19th BPM – Pavão, Pavãozinho and Cantagalo + Chapéu Mangueira
  - 4th Proximity Policing Unit/19th BPM – Babilônia
  - 5th Proximity Policing Unit/23rd BPM – Rocinha and Vidigal
  - 6th Proximity Policing Unit/3rd BPM – São João, in Engenho Novo
  - 7th Proximity Policing Unit/3rd BPM – Jacaré, in Jacaré
  - 8th Proximity Policing Unit/3rd BPM – Lins Complex, in Lins de Vasconcelos
  - 9th Proximity Policing Unit/4th BPM – Turano, in Tijuca and Rio Comprido
  - 10th Proximity Policing Unit/6th BPM – Borel, Salgueiro and Formiga, in Tijuca
  - 11th Proximity Policing Unit/6th BPM – Morro dos Macacos, in Vila Isabel
  - 12th Proximity Policing Unit/16th BPM – Alemão Complex
  - 13th Proximity Policing Unit/16th BPM – Penha Complex
  - 14th Proximity Policing Unit/22th BPM – Adeus + Baiana (Alemão Complex)
  - 15th Proximity Policing Unit/22th BPM – Manguinhos
  - 16th Proximity Policing Unit/4th BPM – Mangueira + Barreira do Vasco, in Vasco da Gama

=== Administrative and operacional commands ===
- Chief of Staff of the Secretary
  - Chief of Staff
    - Legal Advisory
    - Government Relations Advisory
    - Musicians' Independent Company
  - Comptroller's Office
  - Communication Advisory Office
- General Untersecretaryl of Military Police (General Staff)
  - Strategic Oversight Advisory
  - Untersecretary of Internal Affairs
    - 8 Military Judicial Police stations
    - Specialized Military Judicial Police Station
    - Forensic and Criminalistic Investigation Center
    - Prison Unit
  - Untersecretary of Military Police Command and Controlling
    - Operational Control Center
    - Directorate of Critical Communications
    - Administrative Advisory Office
    - General Directorate of Communication and Information Technology
      - Directorate of Technology Infrastructure
      - Directorade of Information Systems
  - Untersecretary of Military Police Intelligence
    - General Directorate of Intelligence and Executive Coordination
      - Directorade of Intelligence
      - Directorade of Counterintelligence
      - Directorade of Intelligence Operations
      - Directorade of Cyber Intelligence
      - Directorade of Intelligence Resource Management
      - Center for Intelligence Education and Research
  - Untersecretary of Operational Management
    - 8 Policing Area Commands
    - Special Operations Command
    - Specialized Policing Command
    - Environmental Policing Command
    - Traffic Police Command
  - Untersecretary of Strategic Programs
    - Proximity Police Command
      - 16 Proximity Police Units
    - "Segurança Presente" Operation Policing Command
    - General Directorate of Programs
      - Center for Citizen Security Programs
      - Center for Integration Programs in Security and Public Services
  - Undersecretariat for Human Resources Management
    - Directorate of Medical Examinations
    - Directorate of Promotions
    - Directorate of Identification
    - Directorate of Recruitment and Selection of Personnel
    - Directorate of Active Personnel
    - Directorate of Payment
    - Directorate of Veterans
    - Directorate of Religious Assistance
    - Directorate of Human Resources and Institutional Mobility
    - Directorate of Pensioners
    - Management and Support for Attached Police Officers Advisory
  - Untersecratary of Administrative Management
    - Strategic Affairs Advisory
    - General Adjutancy
    - General Directorade of Education and Culture
      - Military Police Superior College (to captains and lieutenant-colonels)
      - Dom João VI Military Police Academy (to officer cadets)
      - Military Police Formation Center (to non-commissioned officers and soldiers)
      - Specialized Weapons and Shooting Training Center
      - Center for Physical Education and Sports
      - Center for Research and Historical Archives
      - Distance Education Center
      - 3 military schools (for young civilians) in Niterói, Rio de Janeiro (Campo Grande) and Duque de Caxias
    - General Directorade of Logistic Support
      - Directorate of Transports
      - Directorate of Armament Supply and Maintenance
      - Ordinance Distribution and Storage Center
      - Directorate of Provision (foods, furniture and others)
      - Directorate of Engineering and Architecture
      - Directorate of Bidding and Contracts
      - Directorade of Fuel
    - General Directorate of Social Assistance
      - Marambaia Farm
    - General Directorade of Administration and Finance
      - Directorate of Patrimony
      - Directorate of Finance
      - Directorate of Budget
    - General Directorade of Health:
      - Military Police Central Hospital, in Rio de Janeiro city;
      - Niterói Military Police Hospital
      - Sulacap Military Police Hospital (In activation)
      - Directorate of Health Assistance;
      - Directorate of Operational Health;
      - Directorate of Health Supplies;
      - Health Supplies Center;
      - Directorate of Accreditation;
      - Specialized Rescue and Salvage Operations Group;
      - 5 Polyclinics – Rio de Janeiro (Neighborhoods of Cascadura and Olaria), São João de Meriti and Campos dos Goytacazes, in addition to a rehabilitation polyclinic in Olaria
      - Veterinary Medicine Center;
    - Department of Dentistry
      - Dentistry Center – in Cidade Nova;
      - 1st Dental Clinic – in Campo Grande;
      - Directorate of Oral Health Supplies

=== Battalion of Special Police Operations ===
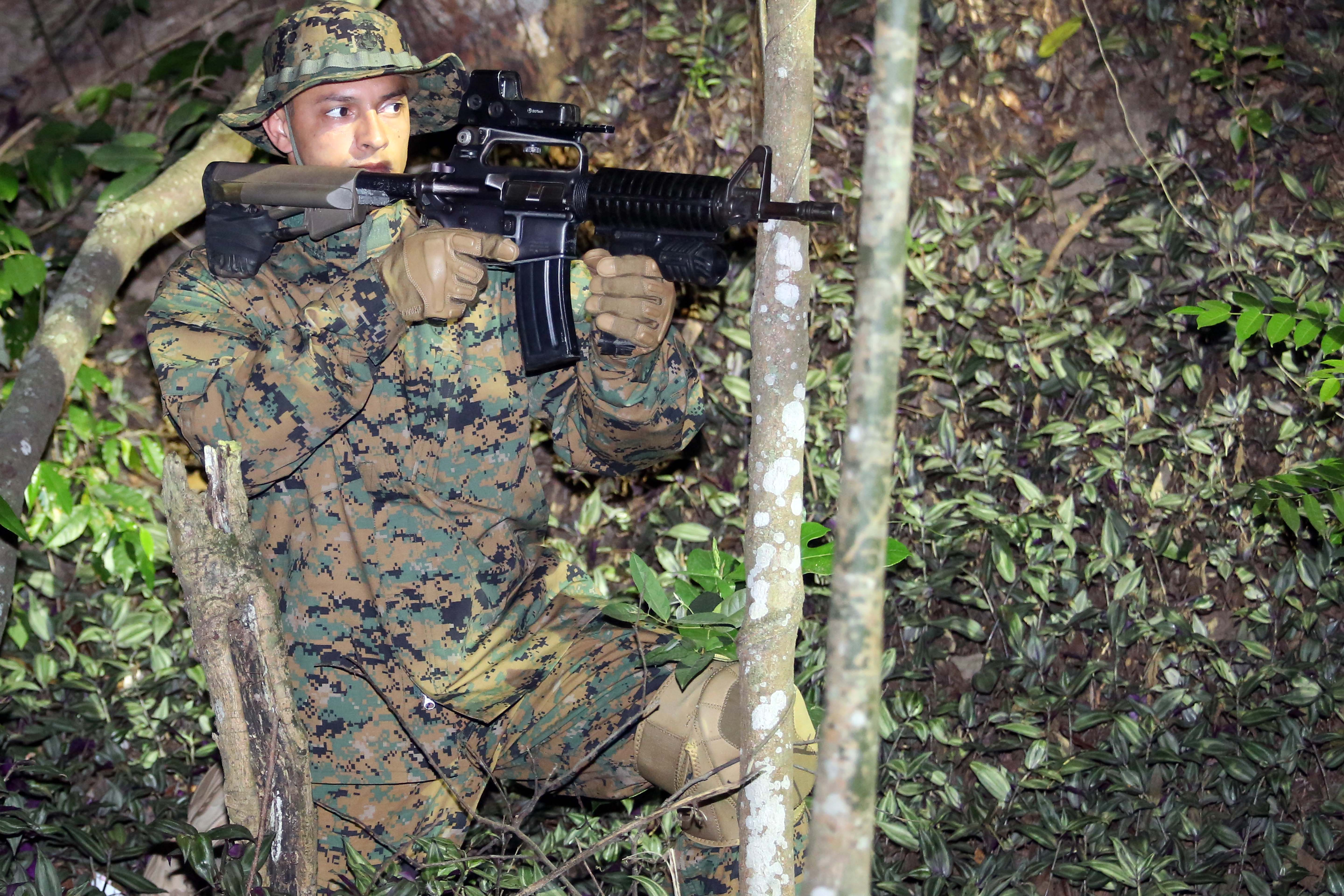
A BOPE police special forces operator

The idea of a group of police officers who were specifically trained to work in extreme risk situations arose after the tragic outcome of the hostage incident in the Criminal Evaristo de Moraes Institute in 1974.

At the time the director of the prison, the police Major Darcy Bittencourt, who was held hostage by criminals who tried to escape, he was killed along with some arrested after the intervention of the police force.

It was established on January 19, 1978, the Bulletin of the Military Police No. 014 on the same date as Center of Special Operations Company, through an elaborate project and presented by Captain PM Paulo César de Amendola de Souza, who witnessed the crisis, then the general commander of PMERJ, Col. Mário José Sotero de Menezes.

Running in CFAP facilities of volunteers and operationally subordinate to the Chief of Staff of PMERJ. The NuCOE worked at a camp on the premises of Squares Training Centre (GFC) in Sulacap in northern Rio. There were 12 tents for about 30 policemen.

On March 1, 1991, there was the creation of the Special Police Operations Battalion (BOPE).

In 2001, the BOPE adopted armored vehicles baptized as "caveirões" to protect PMs in raids in slums. Thus, the battalion was heavily criticized by human rights groups for having printed the insignia of skull pierced by a dagger.

The BOPE is considered today one of the leading police forces to combat urban guerrilla in the world, that due to its wide experience gained in over 30 years of repression of drug traffickers and armed gangs in the favelas of Rio de Janeiro.

=== Proximity Police Units ===
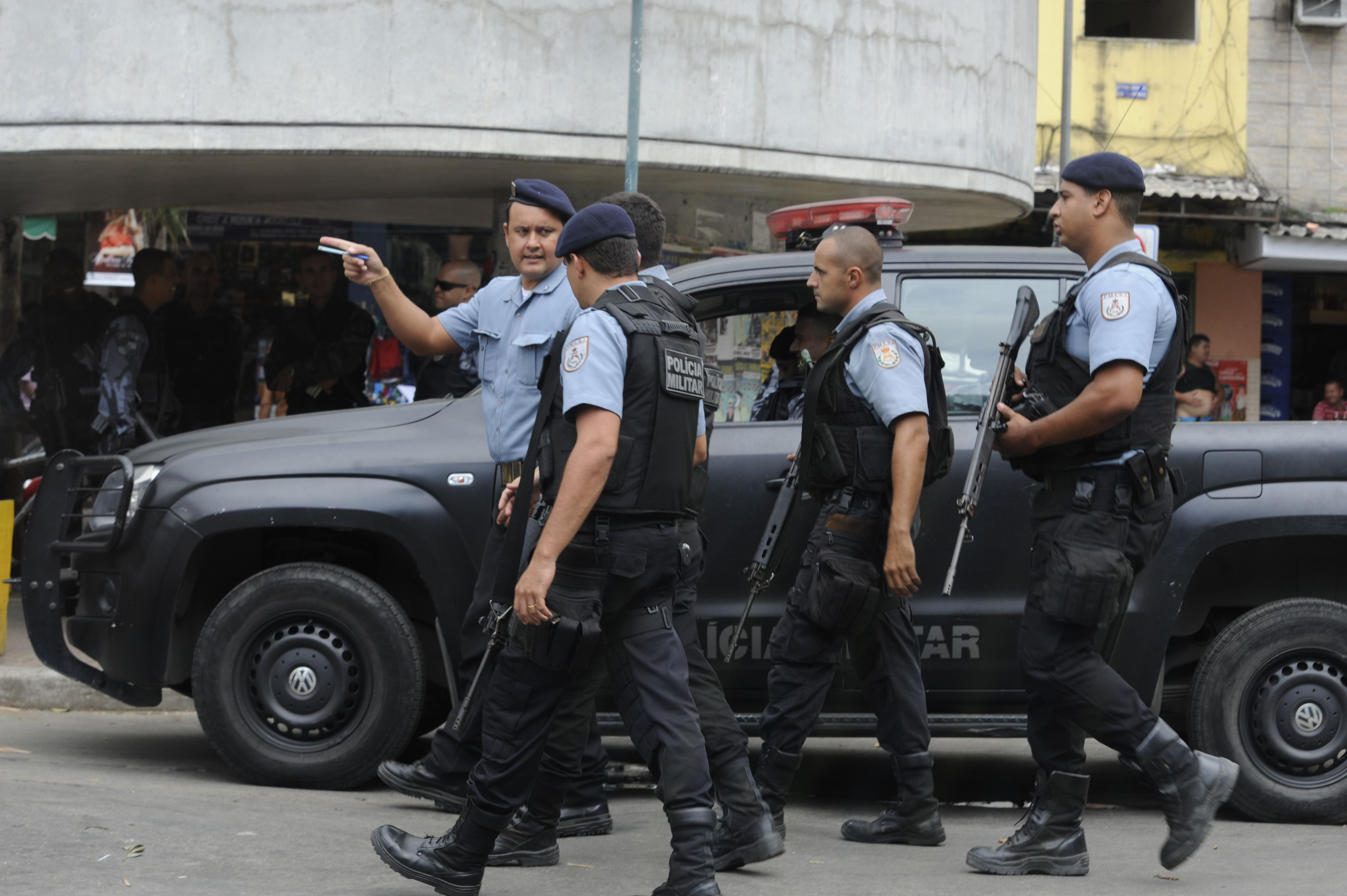
Police officers in the favela of Rocinha.

Pacifying Police Unit is a State Department project in Rio de Janeiro Security that seeks to establish community police in slums, mostly in the state capital, in order to dismantle gangs that previously controlled these territories as true parallel states. Before the project, opened in 2008, only the Tavares Bastos favela, among the more than 500 existing in the city, had no organized crime and drug trafficking.

Because the favelas with Pacifying Police Units had formerly been controlled by armed drug traffickers for more than twenty-five years, the fear of retribution, which was a mainstay of the "law of the traffickers" is slow to die. For instance, in April 2012 when a drug trafficker who had formerly controlled the favela of Mangueira was shot and killed during a police operation in Jacarezinho (before the area had received its own Pacifying Police Unit), others from the same criminal faction ordered businesses to close their doors early in Mangueira — which they did. This despite the fact that Mangueira has a permanent pacification police force as part of its own Pacifying Police Unit. A similar occurrence of businesses closing their doors early in Mangueira because the traffickers ordered it occurred in February 2013.

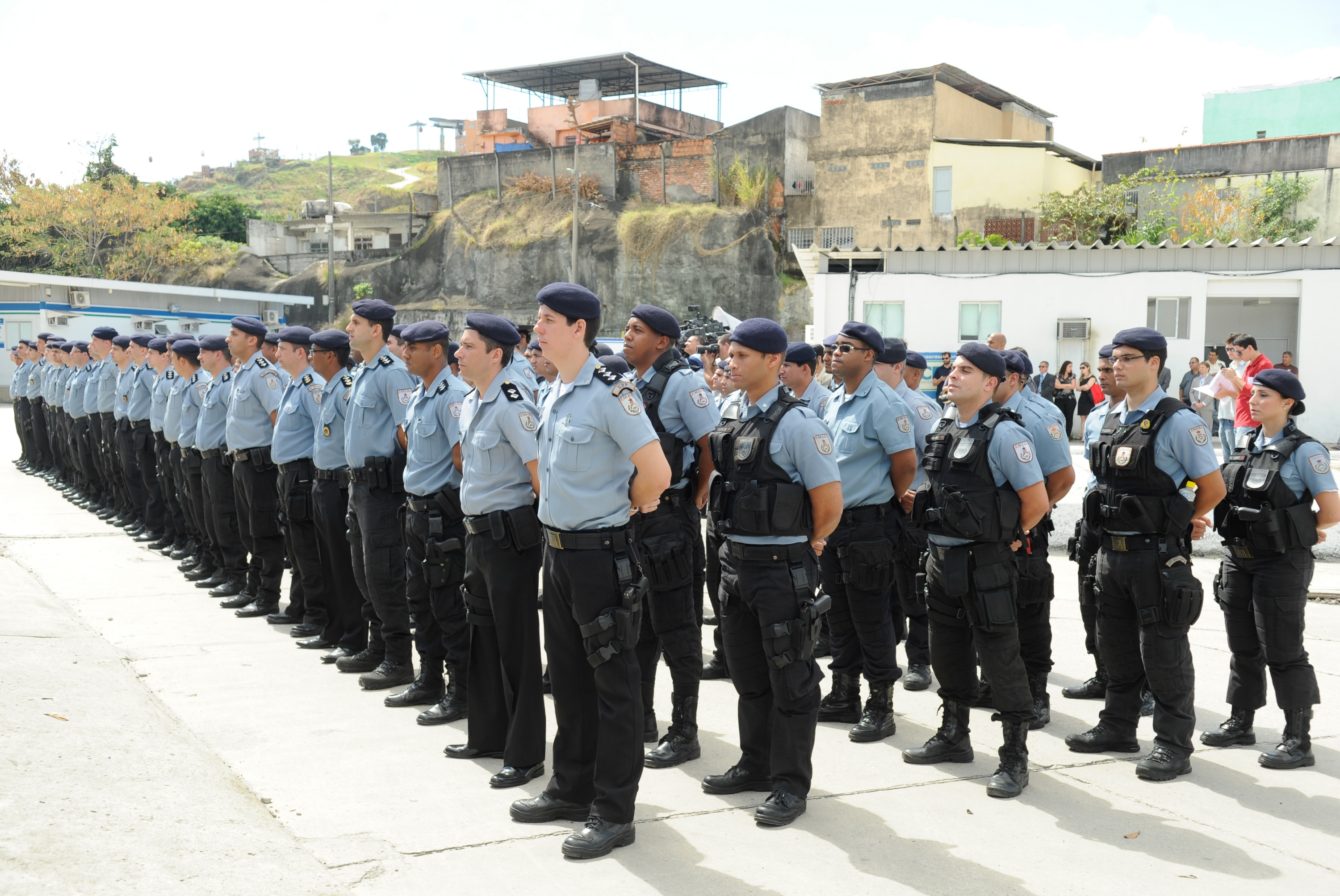
Composition of a unit of the Polícia Pacificadora (UPP), here on the occasion of the ceremony for the change of command of the units.

In May 2012, Beltrame acknowledged that armed criminals had migrated from parts of Rio that have a large police presence due to pacification, to areas with less police and no Pacifying Police Units, such as Niterói, which is nearby, across the bay. Beltrame has stated however that he believes based on analysis of crime data that only gang leaders higher in the hierarchy could reestablish in other favela communities (without Pacifying Police Units); and that lower level traffickers have a much harder time integrating into other geographic areas.

While the favela areas under pacification have seen improvements, there has been an increase in the concentration of criminals in other parts of Rio de Janeiro that don't have the direct benefits of permanent pacification police forces actively patrolling these neighborhoods. Among these areas are those of the Baixada Fluminense, Niterói, and certain neighborhoods in the North Zone.

It was obvious early on that criminals were fleeing particular favelas before BOPE entered to establish a groundwork for a permanent police presence. Previously, when police had attempted to encircle a favela by surprise in order to arrest and kill traffickers, large-scale shootouts would ensue, and innocent favela residents were caught in the crossfire.

While more high-profile gang leaders (also referred to in Rio's media as "traffickers") have been forced to leave favelas now administered by UPP police forces, their familial connections remain. Also, gang members from other favelas who are of the same faction as residents under Pacifying Police Units, still coordinate and visit each other. Exemplifying this point, one of Rio's newspapers reported on July 9, 2012 that groups of criminals fired upon police in different locations within the Complexo do Alemão on the same day that military forces completed their final withdrawal from the area.

There is a well known history of police abuse and corruption in Rio de Janeiro, and for years this only added fuel to the war between drug traffickers controlling Rio's favelas and the police.

In recent years there have been concerted efforts under Secretary Beltrame to root out corrupt police; and this is the very reason that the community policing of the favelas under the Pacifying Police Unit program are staffed by new recruits coming straight from the Pacifying Police Unit police academy — such as the 750 officers who will be policing the large Rocinha favela beginning in August 2012.

Beltrame has stated that the main purpose of the Pacifying Police Units is more toward stopping armed men from ruling the streets than to put an end to drug trafficking. A 2010 report by the World Organization Against Torture did note the drop in the homicide rate within Rio de Janeiro's favelas.

In 2026, under state decree 50.123, the names of the Pacifying Police Command and the Pacifying Police Units were changed to Command of Proximity Police and Proximity Police Units (UPP)

=== Victimization in the Military Police of Rio de Janeiro State ===
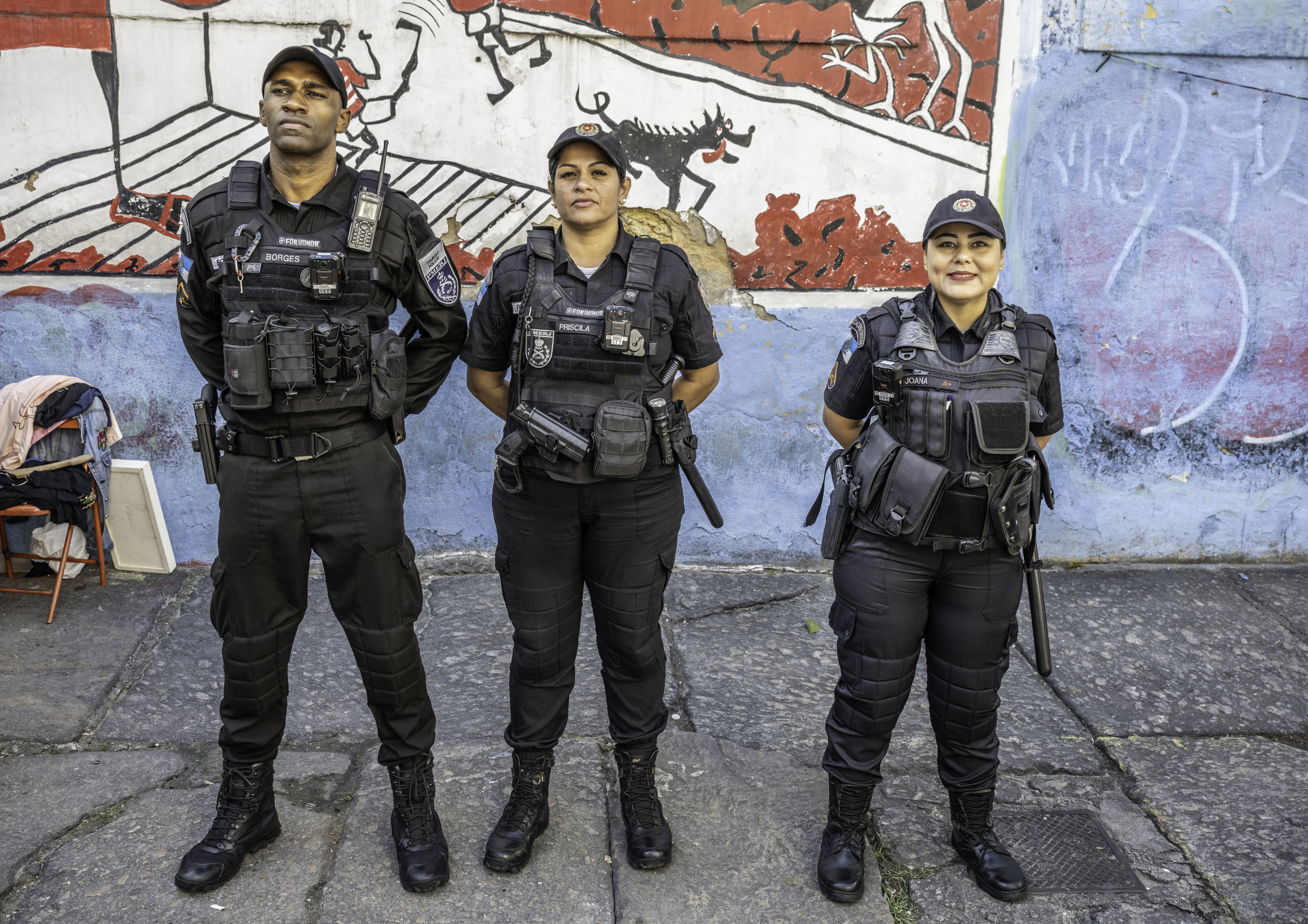
Patrolmen of the Military Police with the new uniform adopted in 2024

Rio de Janeiro is one of the most dangerous places in the world to be a police officer.

According to a study of the analysis of victimization of military police by the State of Rio de Janeiro Military Police (PMERJ), presented by Colonel PM Fábio Cajueiro, Chief of Staff of the Police Command Specialized in the Forum of Police Officers Dead and Wounded, in Sulacap, in 23 years, from 1994 to 2016, the PMERJ had 17,686 casualties, of which 14,452 were injured and 3,234 were dead from unnatural causes.

These figures represent 19.65% of casualties (16.06% of wounded and 3.59% of deaths) of the available personnel in the period, of 90 thousand and five military police.

By way of comparison, to get a sense of how high this victimization rate is, during US participation in World War II, the American casualties rate was 6.69%. Also for comparison, the Brazilian Expeditionary Force (FEB) casualty index, in the aforementioned war, was 9.99%. Colonel PM Cajueiro pointed out that the probability of being injured as a military police officer in the State of Rio de Janeiro is 765 times greater than in wars.

Military police victimization in 2016 registered 363 PM injured by firearms, with 104 of these police officers killed. These numbers represent a break with the trend in the number of deaths of military police officers, which according to the Public Security Institute (ISP) Police Victimization Report (1998 to November 2015) had been declining since 2007, of the PMERJ.

According to the ISP report, the chance of a casualty officer being killed by assailants (robbery crime) is 5877% higher than a person from another profession.

== Campaigns against crime and shootings ==
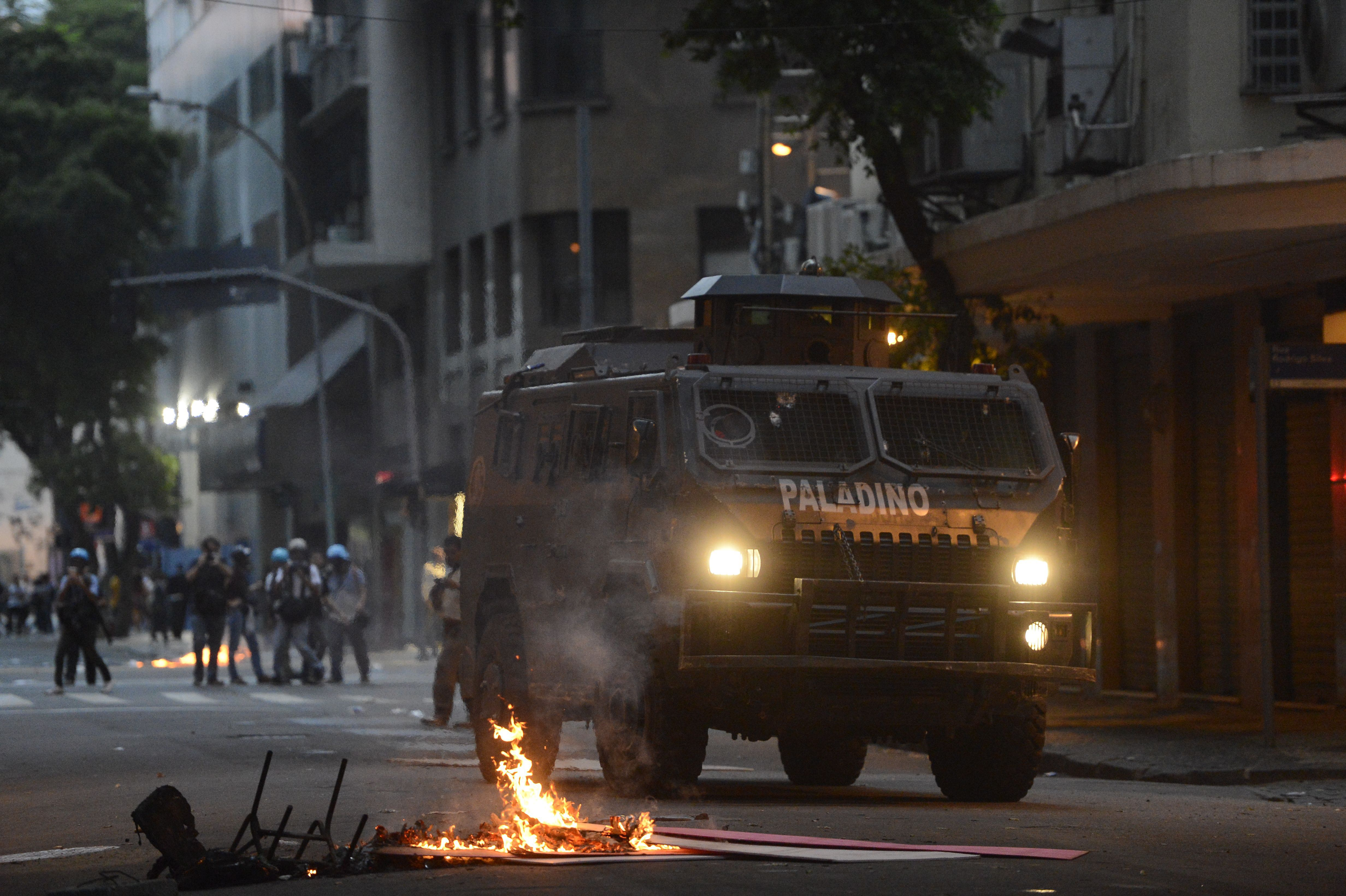
Rio de Janeiro police Armoured car in riot control.

- Complexo do Alemão massacre
  - June 27, 2007, was the result of an ongoing conflict between drug dealers and the police in the borough of the same name in Rio de Janeiro, which consisted of a group of large favelas in the northern region of the city, when a large Military Police and Civil Police of Rio de Janeiro State operation killed 19 people and injured several others.
- Helicopter shot down in gun battle
  - October 18, 2009, two policemen were killed after gang members shot down their helicopter during a battle with police in Rio de Janeiro, Brazil. Twelve people were killed on the ground, including two civilians. Ten of those are said to have been gang members.
- 2010 Rio de Janeiro Security Crisis
  - In November 2010, there was a major security crisis in the Brazilian city of Rio de Janeiro and some of its neighboring cities. The city's criminal drug trafficking factions initiated a series of attacks in response to the government placing permanent police forces into Rio's slums.
- Rio de Janeiro school shooting
  - April 7, 2011, 12 children aged between 12 and 14 were killed and 12 others seriously wounded after an armed man entered Tasso da Silveira Municipal School, an elementary school in Realengo on the western fringe of Rio de Janeiro. Two policemen who were patrolling the area were alerted, military policeman Third Sergeant Márcio Alexandre Alves shot the gunman in the leg and in the stomach; he fell down a staircase and then committed suicide by shooting himself in the head.
- Operation Containment

It was considered one of the largest police operations in the history of Rio de Janeiro, launched on October 23, 2025, and ended with 93 rifles seized, 113 arrested, and 121 dead (including 4 police officers). It was considered the deadliest police action in Brazil. The police operation involved more than 2,500 agents from the civil and military police of Rio de Janeiro. In a tactical incursion within the operational theater, the security forces pushed the drug traffickers out of the urban area into a wooded area where Special Police Operations Battalion, in a blocking action, cornered the criminals, preventing their escape, which resulted in a large number of deaths among members of the Comando Vermelho criminal faction. The operation was considered by many to be a great tactical success and one of the biggest blows against Comando Vermelho in its history.

== Uniforms ==
Since 1975, the PMERJ use dark grey blue in their uniforms. Special units have different uniforms for each service.

== Ranks and insignia ==
The PMERJ has the same hierarchical classification of the Brazilian Army, with another type of insignias.

=== Officers ===
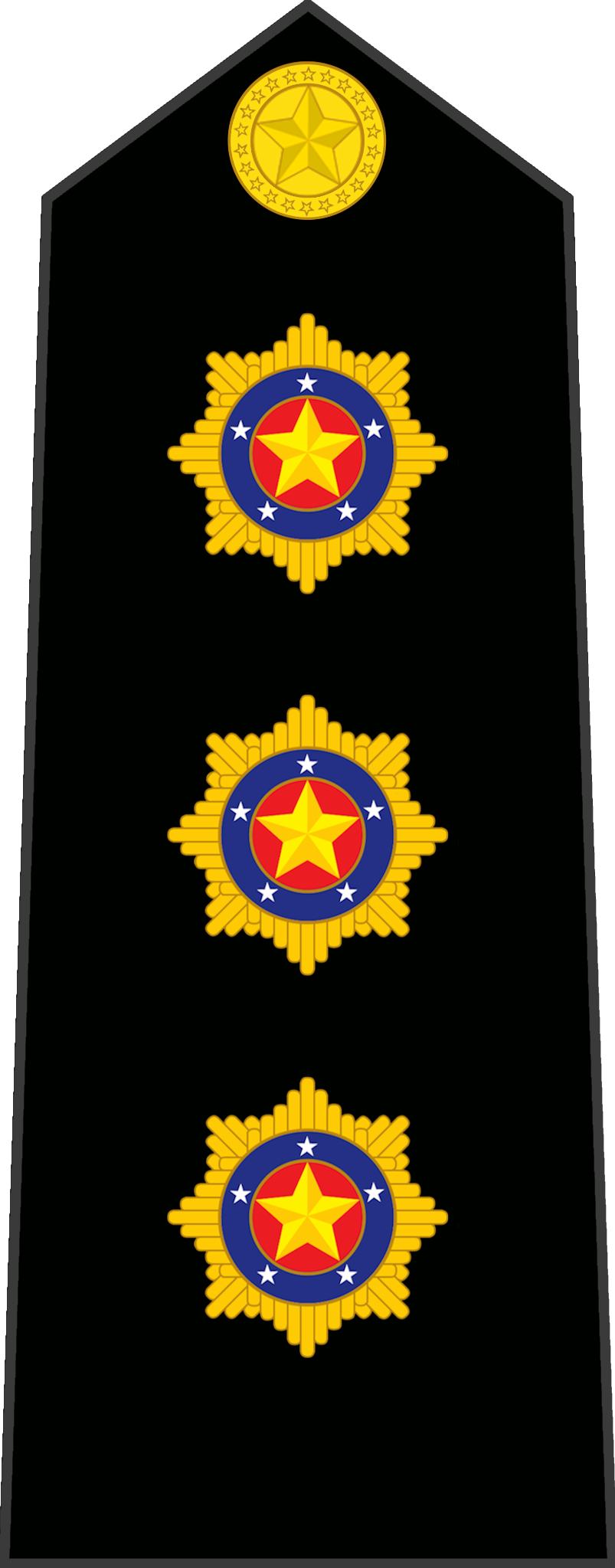
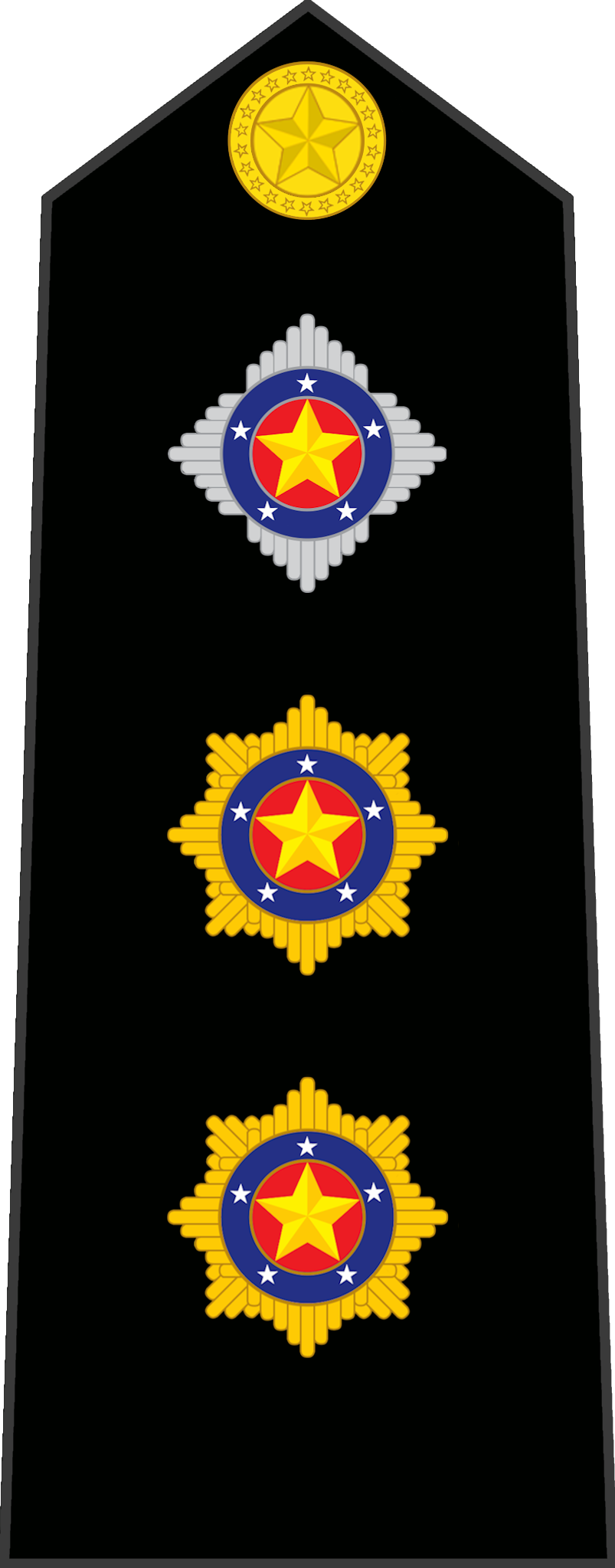
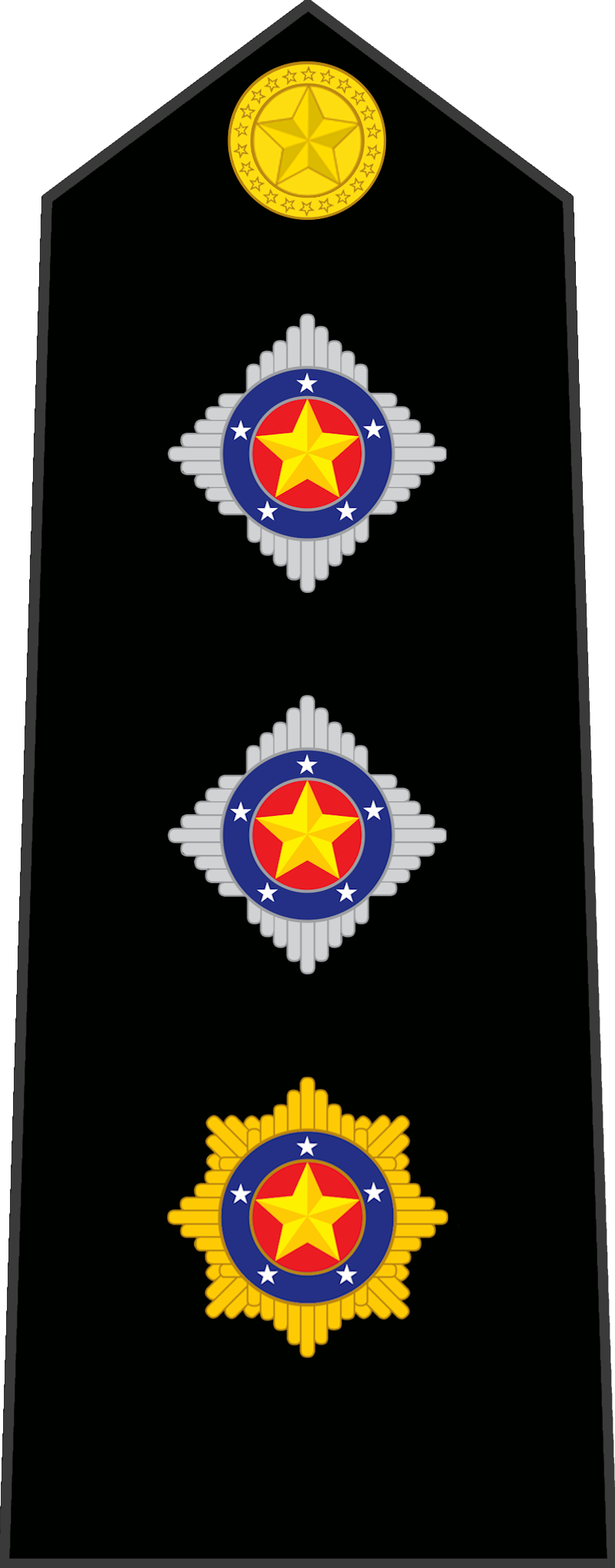
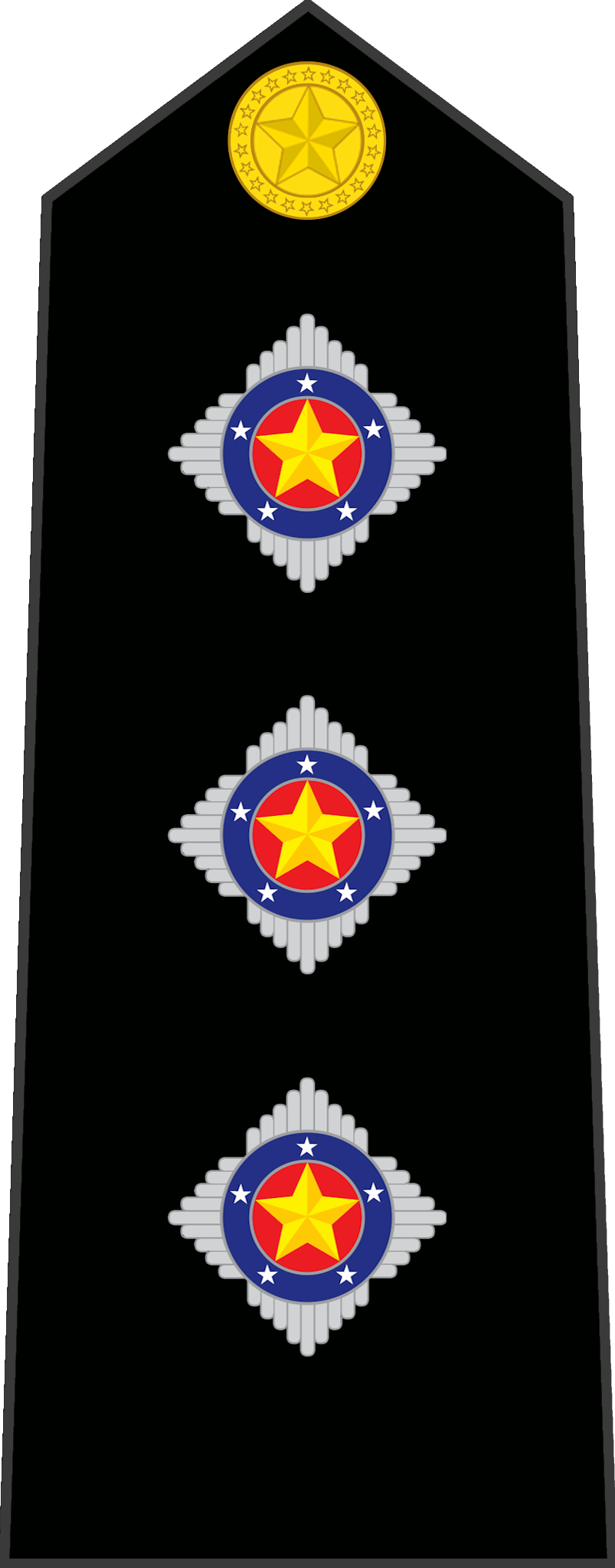
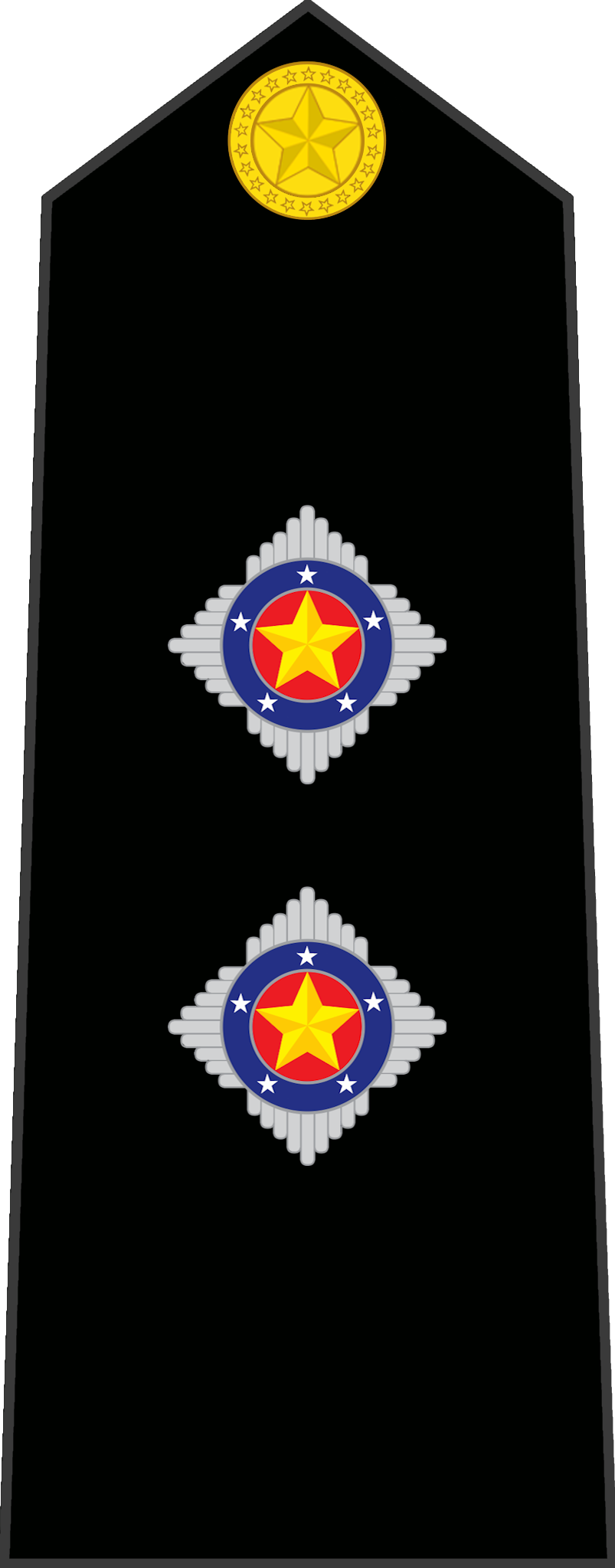
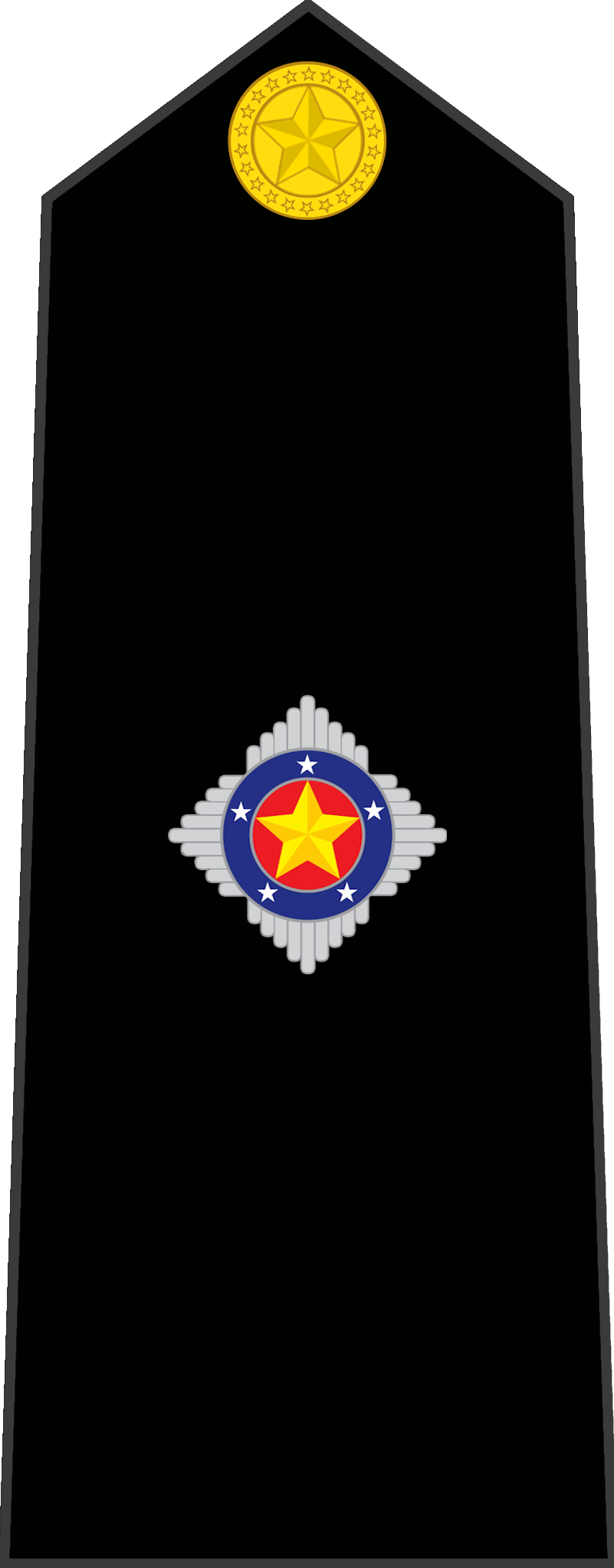
Rank group	General / flag officers	Senior officers			Junior officers
Brazilian Military Police
Brazilian Military Police		Coronel	Tenente-coronel	Major	Capitão	Primeiro tenente	Segundo tenente

=== Enlisted ===
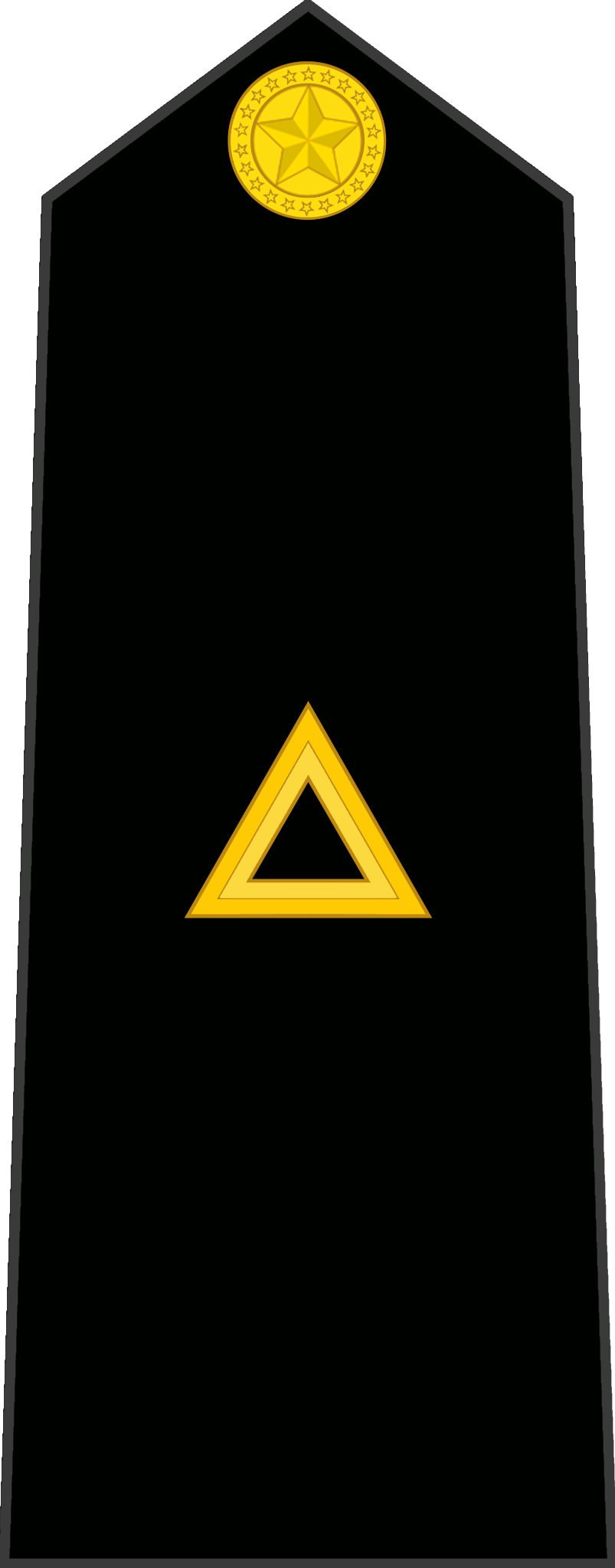
Rank group	Senior NCOs				Junior NCOs	Enlisted
Brazilian Military Police
Brazilian Military Police	Subtenente	Primeiro-sargento	Segundo-sargento	Terceiro-sargento	Cabo	Soldado primeira classe	Soldado segunda classe

All rank insignia are worn on the epaulettes of the shirt, except for sergeants, corporal and soldiers, which are worn on each sleeve, below the institutional patch (left) and state flag (right).

== Inventory ==
=== Weapons ===
Model	Origin	Type	Notes
Taser	Brazil	Non-lethal weapon	Standard issue
Smoke grenade	Brazil	Non-lethal weapon	Standard issue
Riot gun	Brazil	Non-lethal weapon	Standard issue
Taurus Model 605	Brazil	Revolver	Standard issue
Taurus PT-100	Brazil	Semi-automatic pistol	Standard issue
Taurus PT 24/7	Brazil	Semi-automatic pistol	Standard issue
Taurus MT 40	Brazil	Submachine gun	Standard issue
IMBEL MT-12	Brazil	Submachine gun	Standard issue
Heckler & Koch MP5	Germany	Submachine gun	Special units only
Remington Model 1100	United States	Shotgun	Riot control only
Mossberg 500	United States	Shotgun	Riot control only
AR-15	United States	Assault rifle	Standard issue
M4 carbine	United States	Assault rifle	Standard issue
IMBEL IA2	Brazil	Assault rifle	Standard issue
FN FAL	Belgium	Assault rifle	Standard issue
ParaFAL	Belgium	Assault rifle	Standard issue
M16A2	United States	Assault rifle	Special units only
IMBEL MD2	Brazil	Assault rifle	Special units only
Heckler & Koch PSG1	Germany	Sniper rifle	Special units only

=== Vehicles ===
Model	Manufacturer	Type	Notes	Photo
Ford Ka	Ford	Patrol car	Standard vehicle	
Frontier D40	Nissan	Multi-purpose car	Special police/ Highway patrol	
S-10 Third generation	Chevrolet	Response car	Standard vehicle	
Amarok	Volkswagen	Multi-purpose car	Riot police car	
Master	Renault	Police van	Riot police car	
Daily	Iveco	Police van	Special police	
Ducato	Fiat	Police van	Standard vehicle	
XT660	Yamaha Motor Company	Police motorcycle	Standard vehicle	
CB600	Honda	Police motorcycle	Riot police	
Ford Cargo 815	Ford Motor Company	Armoured personnel carrier	Vehicle war on drugs	
VW Cargo 1722	Volkswagen	Armoured personnel carrier	Vehicle war on drugs	
Maverick	Paramount Group	Infantry mobility vehicle	Special operations	
Volkswagen Constellation	Volkswagen	Police truck	Special operations/Water cannon	
Volkswagen Constellation	Volkswagen	Police truck	Special operations/High Observation Platform	
Beit Alfa Model MAN RCU 6000 II	Beit Alfa technologies	Armoured Heavy equipment/Police truck	Water cannon	
Backhoe loader		Armoured Heavy equipment	Vehicle auxiliary	

=== Aircraft ===
Aircraft	Type	Versions	In service	Photo	Note
Schweizer 300	Training	Schweizer 300 CBi	01		Designated phoenix 6.
Eurocopter AS350	Patrol helicopter	AS-350B3	06		Designated phoenix 1, 2, 3, 7, 8, 10. Phoenix 3 was shot down by narcotraffickers during gunbattle at the Morro dos Macacos in October 2009 while Phoenix 4 suffered a total loss in November 2016. The cause of the fall was a loss of tail rotor function.
Bell Huey II	Special operations Armed helicopter	Huey II	01		Designated phoenix 5.
Eurocopter EC145	Patrol helicopter SAR	EC145	01		Designated phoenix 9

== Gallery ==
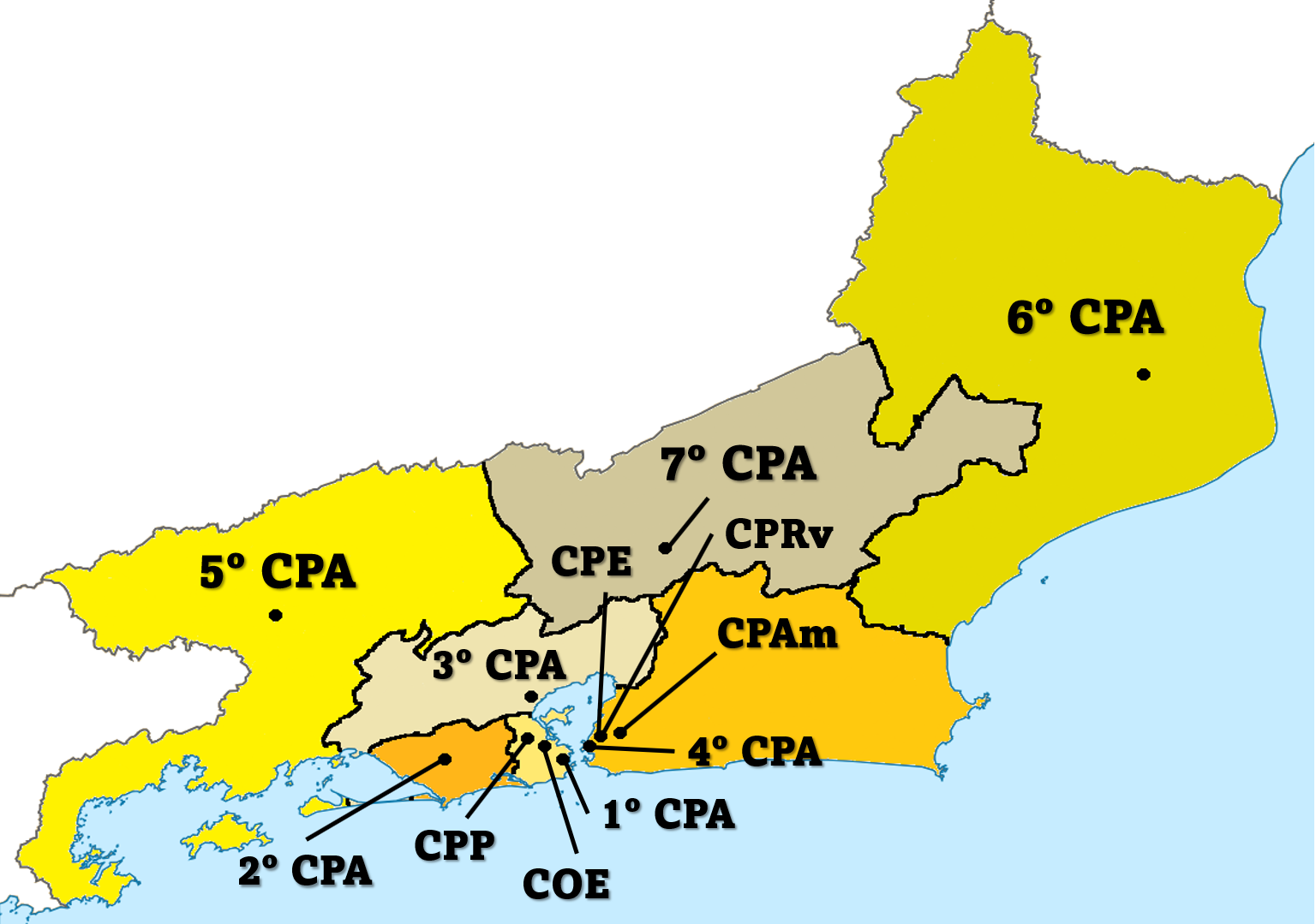
PAC's – state division

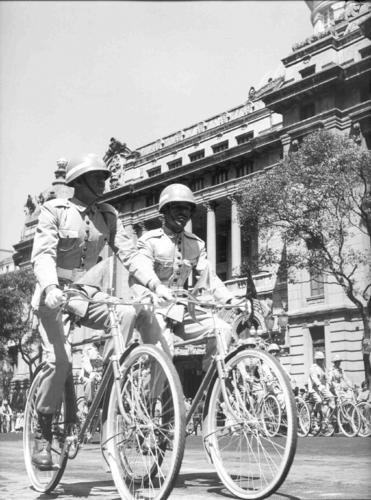
Police officers – 1950s

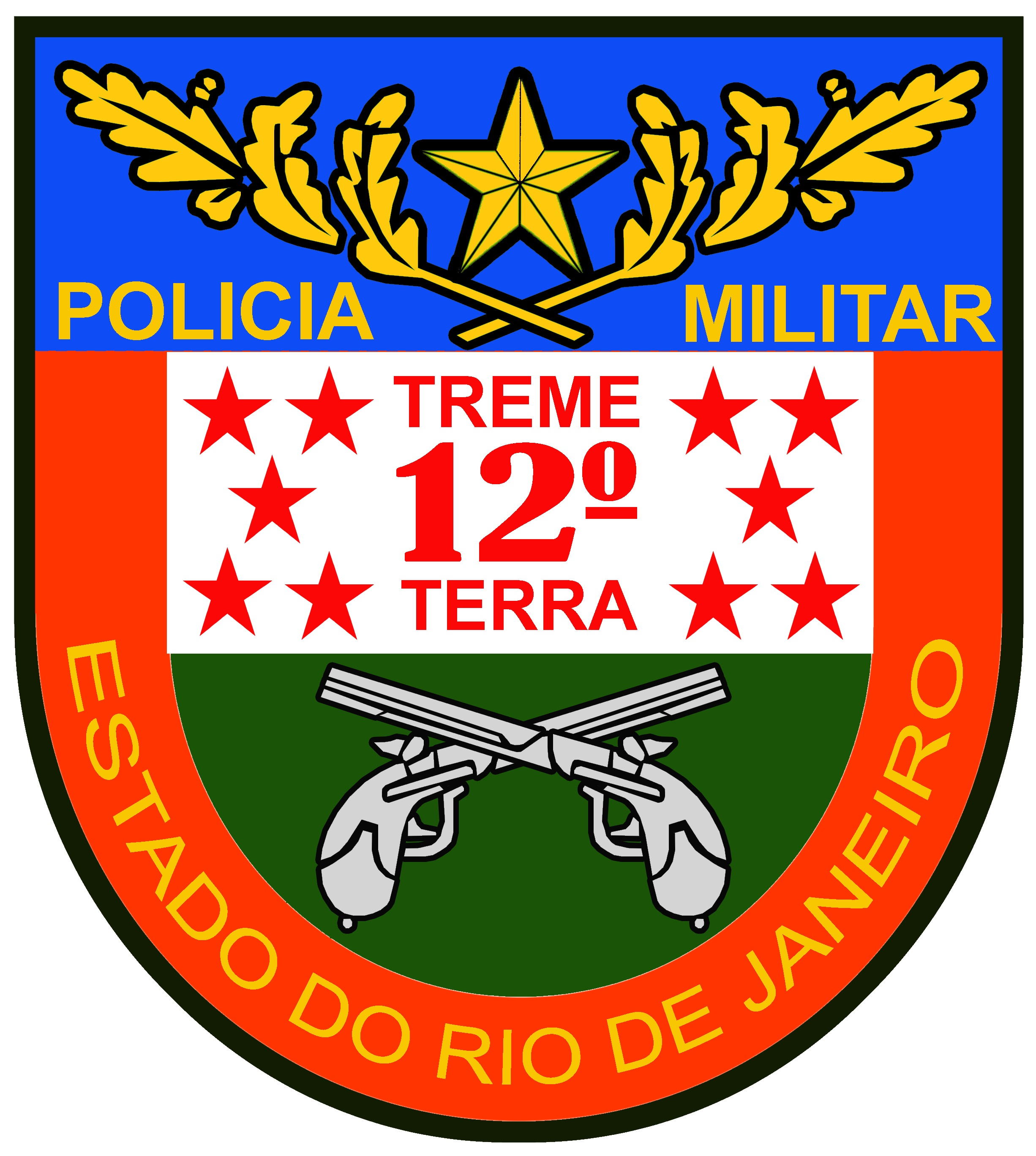
Old PMERJ blazon (until 1975)

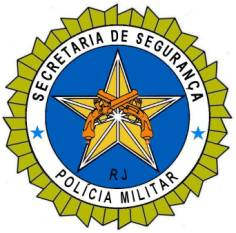
Old PMERJ blazon (between 1975 and 1983)

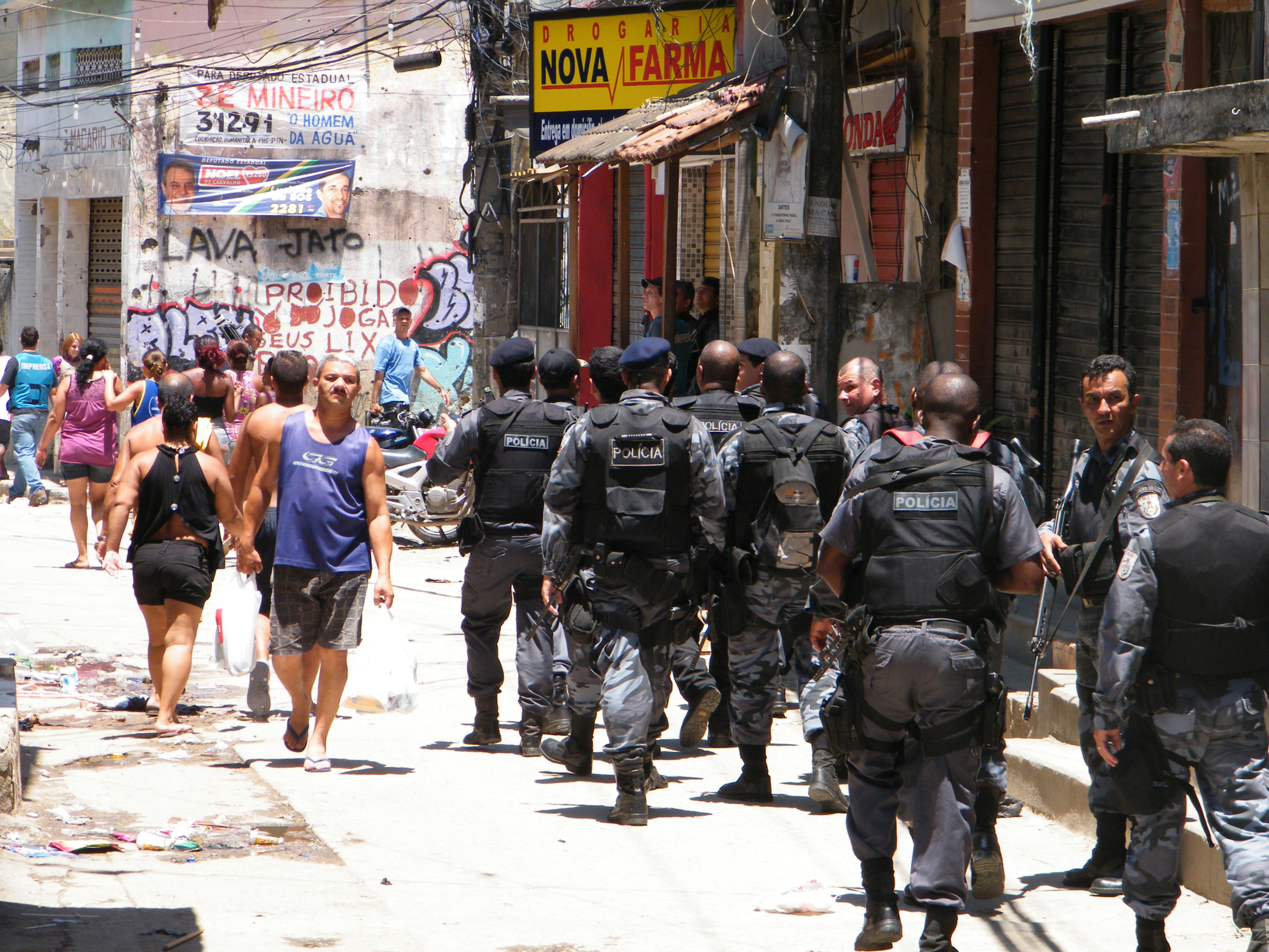
Military police operation in Complexo do Alemão (November 2010)

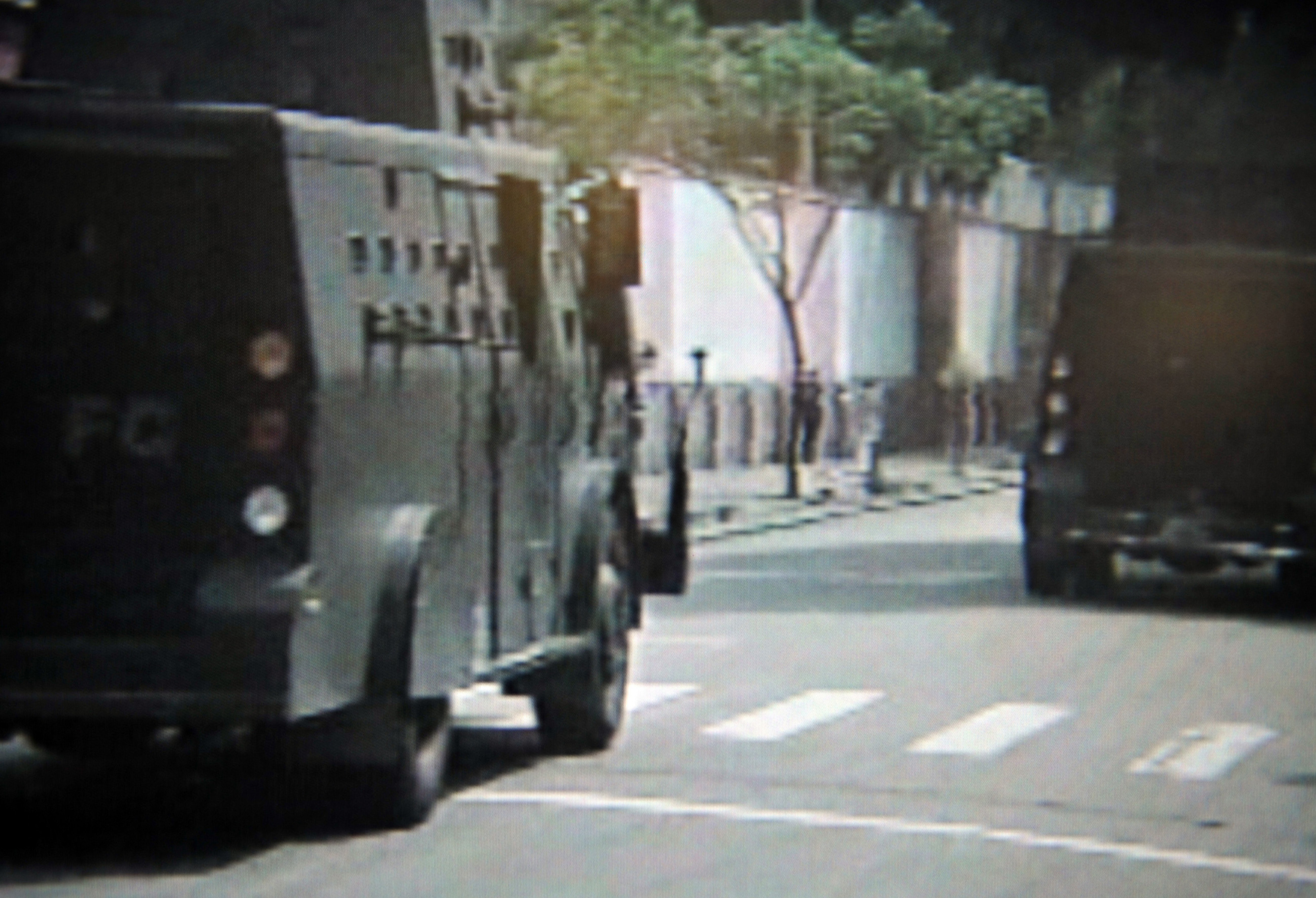
Special Police Operations Battalion - Armored vehicle

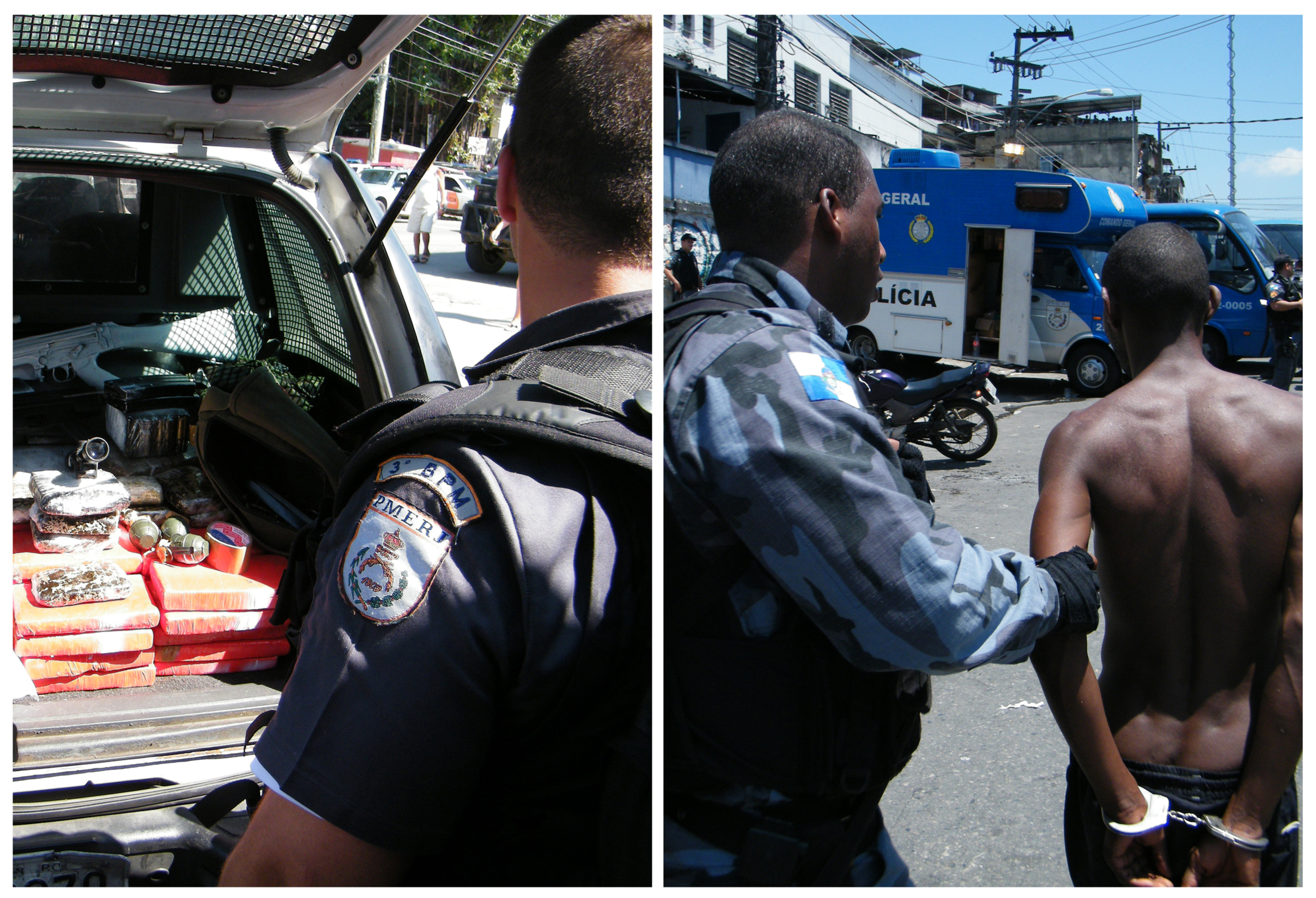
Military Police in combating crime in the favelas of Rio de Janeiro

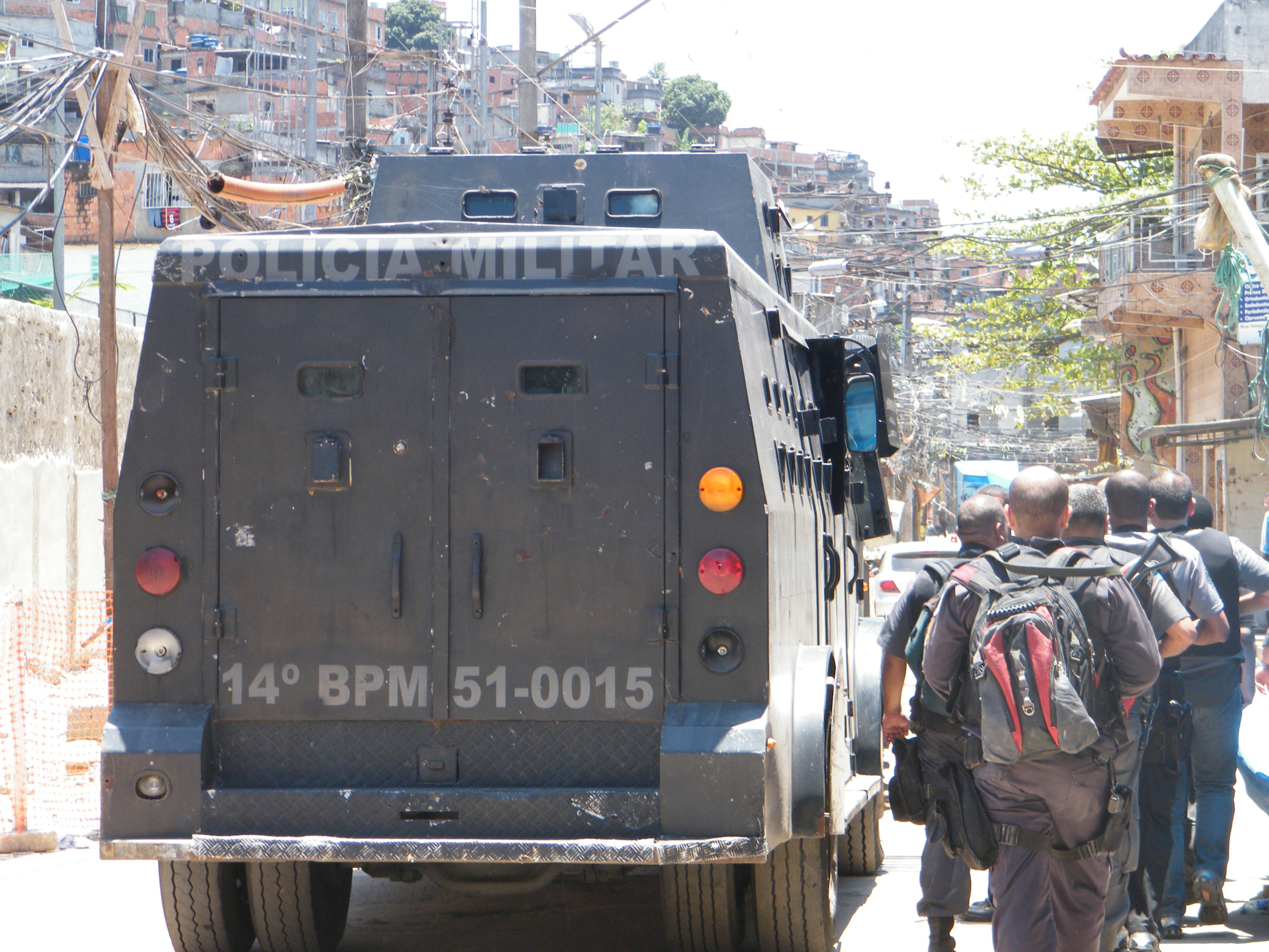
VW Cargo 1722 Military Police armored vehicle

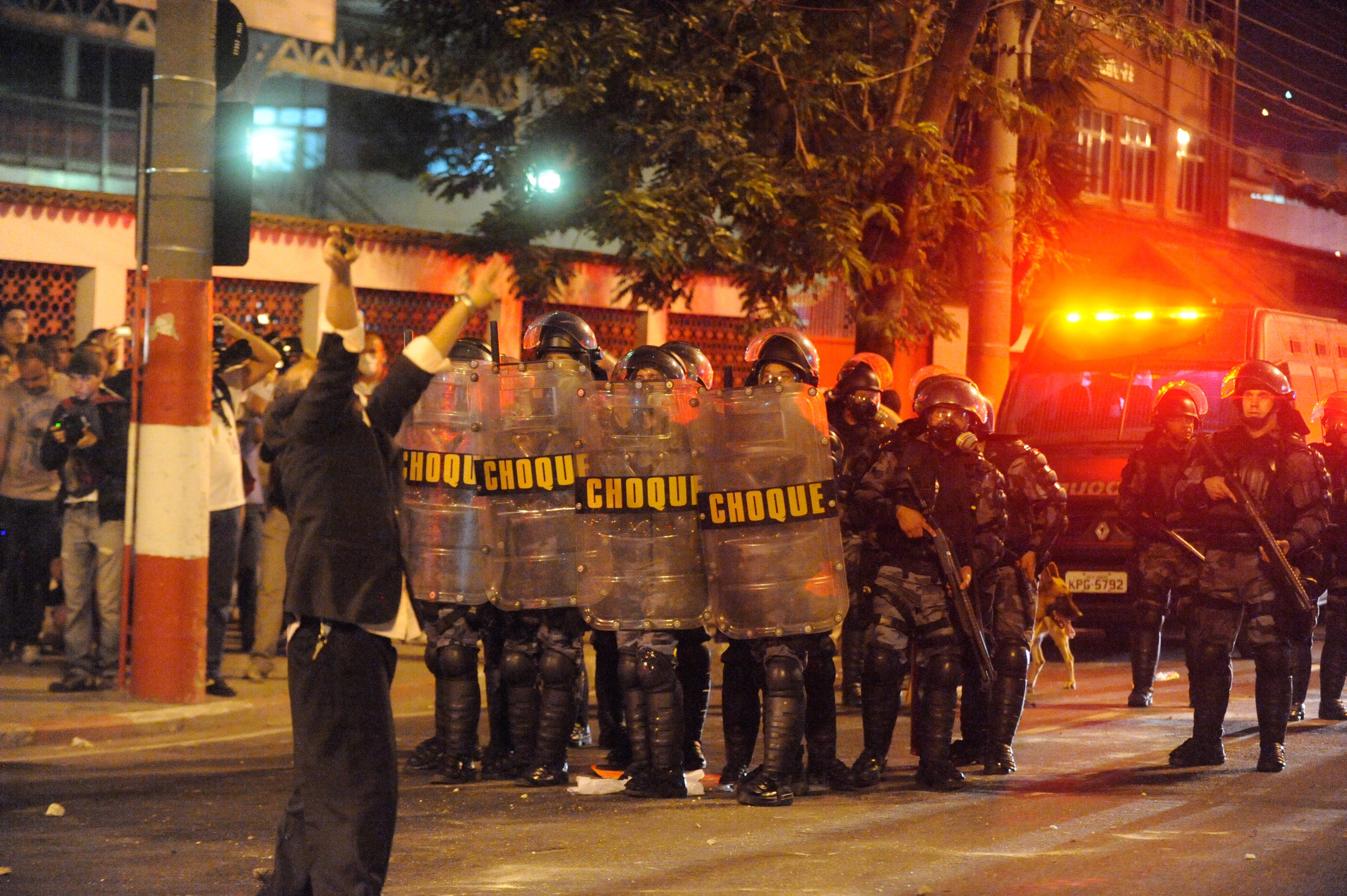
Riot Control operation (2013)

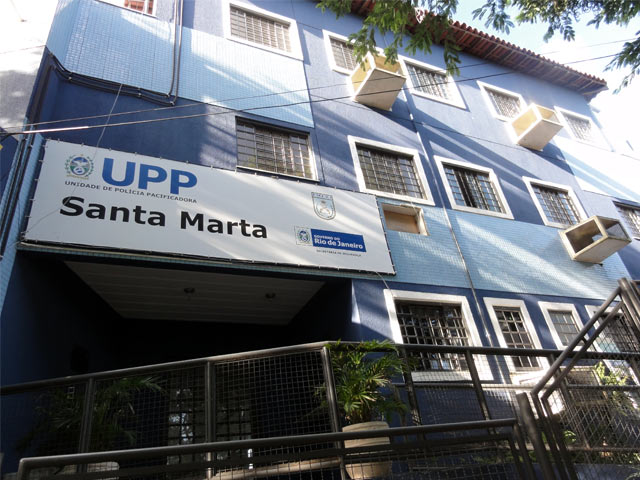
Police station in Santa Marta favela

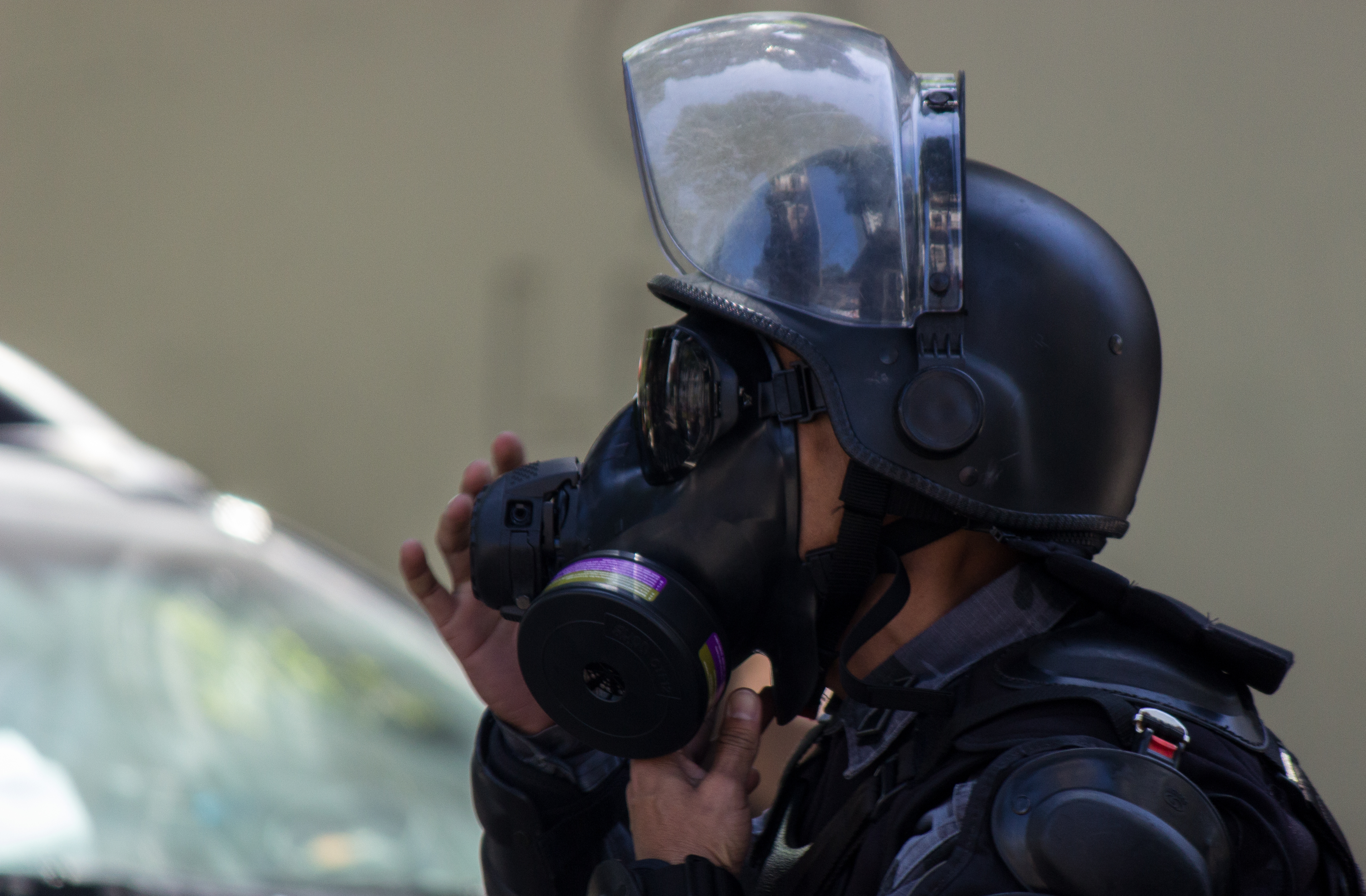
Riot control officer

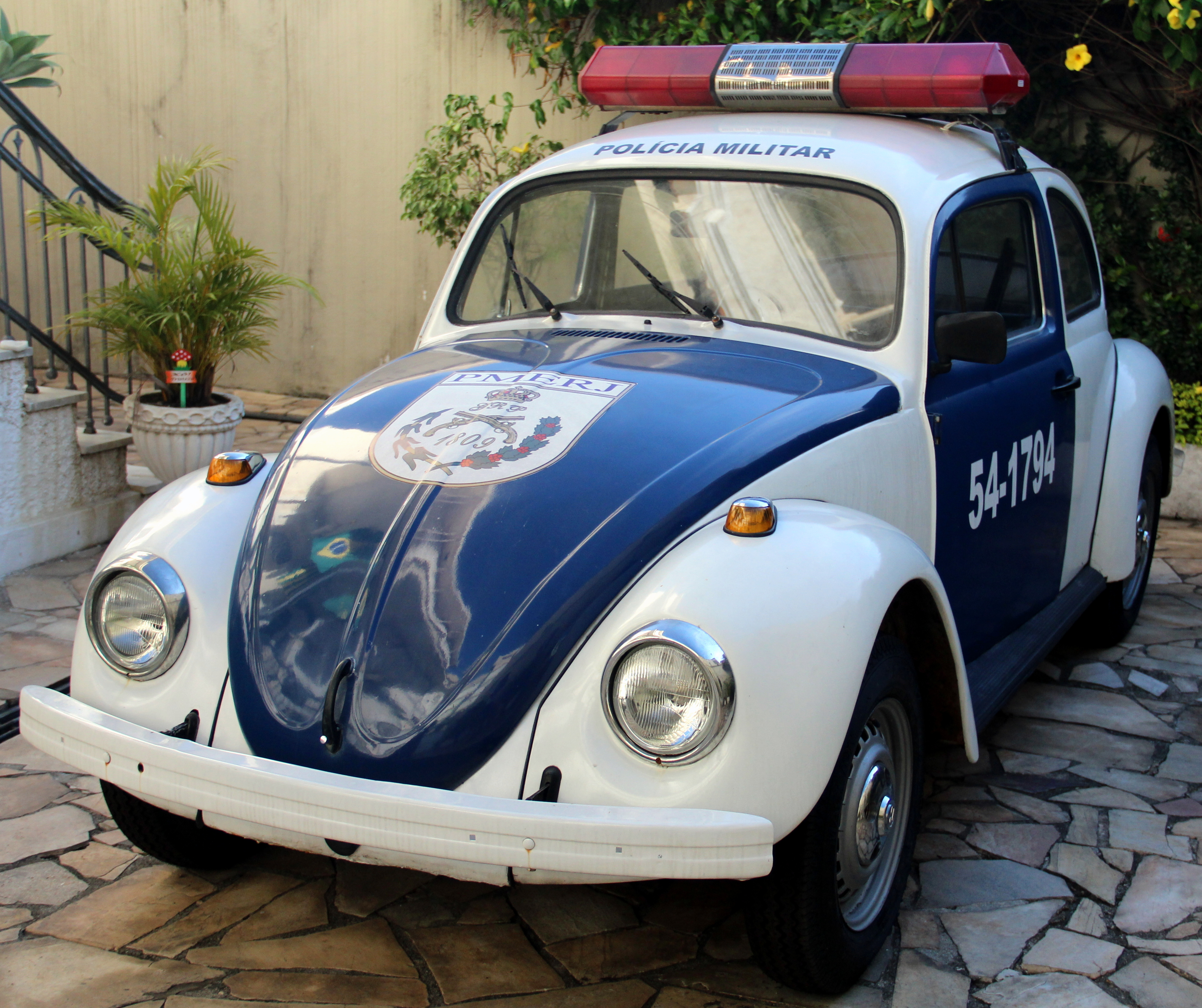
Volkswagen Fusca Patrol car in the late 1980s.

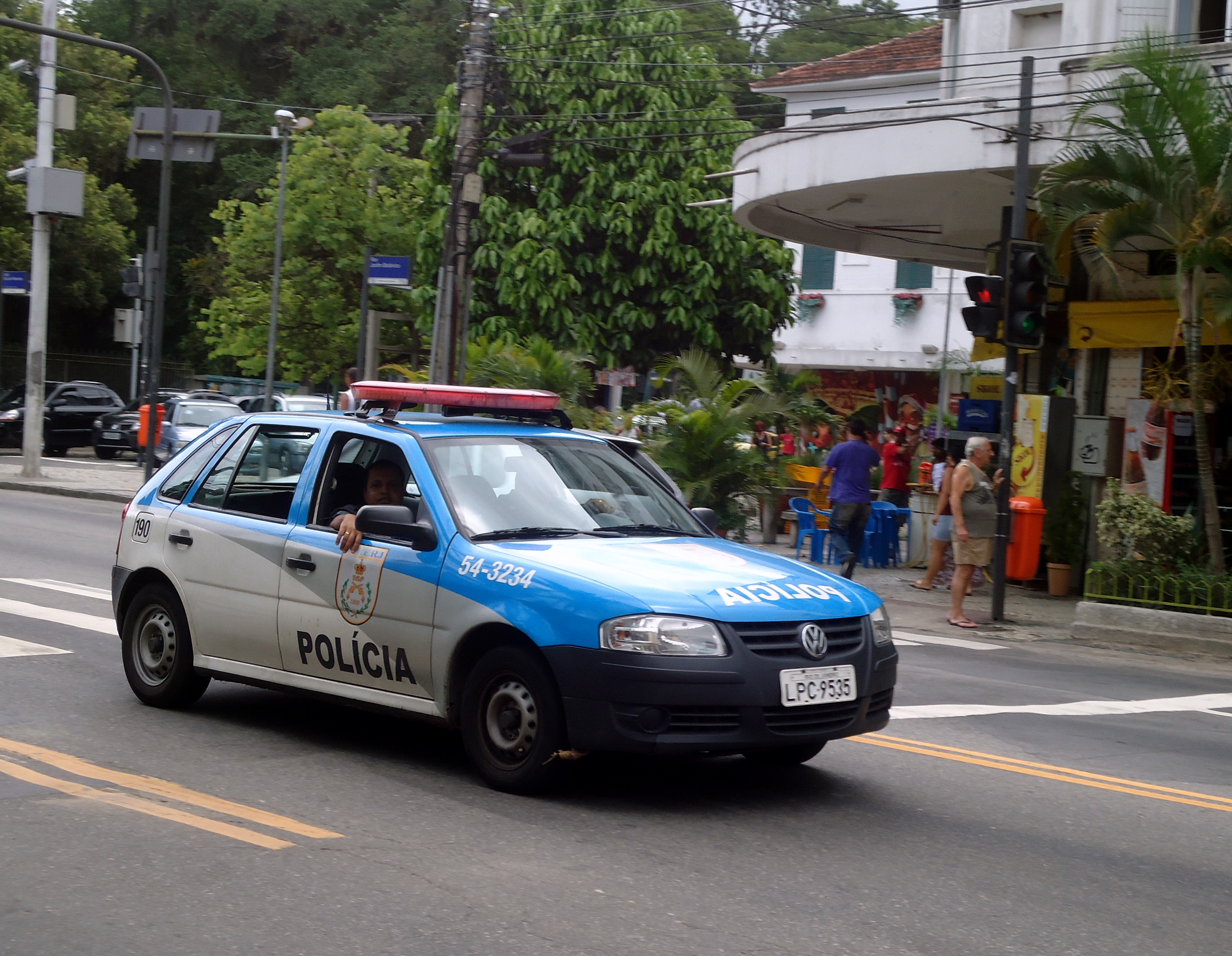
Volkswagen Patrol car in 2006.

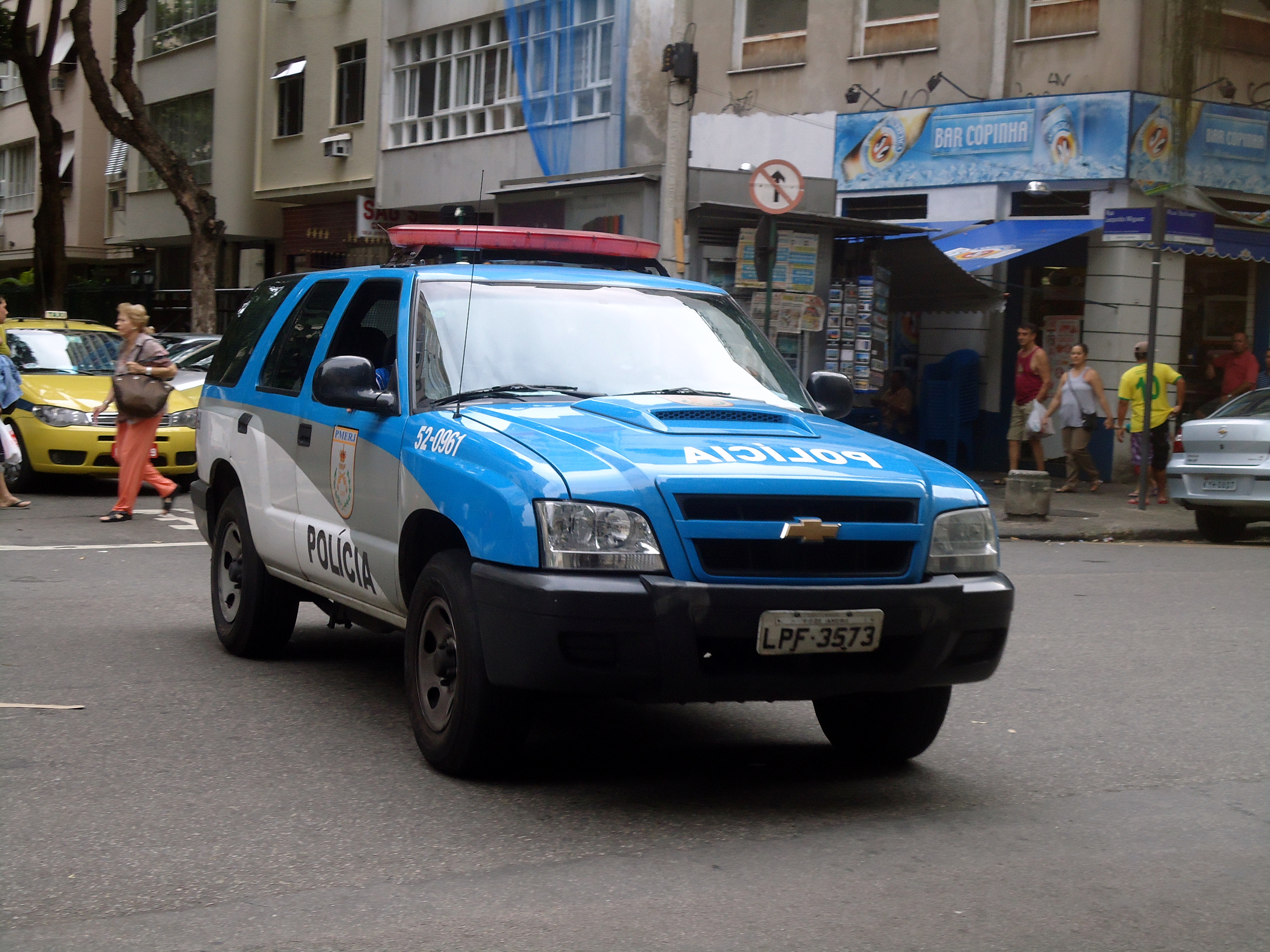
Chevrolet Blazer Response Car in 2009.

== International cooperations ==
Under the United Nations, in cooperation with the Brazilian Army, the Military Police of Rio de Janeiro State has served in Angola, Mozambique, East-Timor, Sudan, and Haiti.

== In popular media ==
=== Fast Five ===
The PMERJ appear in Fast Five, the fifth movie of the Fast and the Furious series, where many of them are corrupt and in the payroll of drug lord Hernan Reyes, being sent to try and retrieve his vault full of his drug money after it was stolen from their station alongside the Federal Highway Police (PRF) and Rio civil police.

However, thanks to Dominic Toretto and his team, all of their pursuing cruisers are destroyed, their corrupt officers slaughtered, and Reyes himself executed by DSS Agent Luke Hobbs in revenge for murdering his team back in the favelas.

Only one officer is shown to be loyal and honorable to her duty as a police officer, Agent Hobbs ally in Rio, Elena Neves, whose husband served in law enforcement before he was killed in the line of duty, inspiring her to join the force, but avoid being corrupted by Reyes as so many of the other officers were.

The primary vehicles of this police force featured in the film are mostly Chevy Blazers, Mazda 626, Volkswagen Passat station wagons, and Yamaha WR motorcycles.

=== Elite Squad ===
Elite Squad is a 2007 Brazilian crime film directed by José Padilha.

The film is a semi-fictional account of the Batalhão de Operações Policiais Especiais (BOPE), the Special Police Operations Battalion of the Rio de Janeiro Military Police, analogous to the American SWAT teams.

== See also ==
- Civil Police of Rio de Janeiro State
- Batalhão de Operações Policiais Especiais (BOPE), a special police unit of the Military Police of Rio de Janeiro State (PMERJ)
- Military Firefighters Corps of the State of Rio de Janeiro
