= Gil Vianna =

Brazilian politician and physician (1965–2020)

City councilor of Campos dos Goytacazes
- In office 2009–2016

Member of the Legislative Assembly of Rio de Janeiro
- In office 2017–2020

Personal details
- Born: July 10, 1965 Campos dos Goytacazes, Rio de Janeiro, Brazil
- Died: May 19, 2020 (aged 54) Campos dos Goytacazes, Rio de Janeiro, Brazil
- Party: Social Liberal Party (Brazil) (PSL)
- Other political affiliations: PSB (former); PR (former); PSDC (former)
- Profession: Politician, Military police officer

Gil Manhães Vianna Júnior (10 July 1965 – 19 May 2020), better known simply as Gil Vianna, was a Brazilian Politician and member of the Military Police of Rio de Janeiro State.

== Life ==
Born on 10 July 1965 in Campos dos Goytacazes. Vianna was the son of Gil Manhães Vianna, a Waiter and Getúlia Santos Arêas Vianna, a Housewife.

In 1984, Vianna joined the Brazilian Army.

In 1986, he joined the Military Police of Rio de Janeiro State, where he remained for two decades until the start of his political career. At the time of his retirement, Vianna held the rank of Sergeant.

In 2008, Vianna successfully ran for the City council of his birth city of Campos dos Goytacazes. He started his term in 2009 and remained until 2012.

In 2012, Vianna was reelected City councilor of Campos dos Goytacazes. His second tenure started in 2013 and ended in 2016.

In 2014, he ran for a spot at the Legislative Assembly of Rio de Janeiro but failed to secure enough votes for the post.

In 2017, Vianna was nominated for a spot in Legislative Assembly of Rio de Janeiro after a vacancy.

In 2018. he was reelected State Deputy. This time, he remained in power from 2019 until his death in 2020.

At the time of his death, Vianna was married to Andrea Araújo Cordeiro Vianna and had two sons and two daughters (one previously deceased).

== Death ==
On 19 May 2020, Vianna died in Campos dos Goytacazes at the age of 54 from complications brought on by COVID-19 during the COVID-19 pandemic in Brazil.
