= Rocha, Rio de Janeiro =

Rocha
- Neighborhood
- Location in Rio de Janeiro Rocha (Brazil)
- Coordinates: 22°53′55″S 43°14′59″W
- Country: Brazil
- State: Rio de Janeiro (RJ)
- Municipality/City: Rio de Janeiro
- Zone: North Zone

Rocha is a neighborhood in the North Zone of Rio de Janeiro, Brazil.
