= Yellow Line (Rio de Janeiro) =

RJ-079
- Yellow Line; Avenida Governador Carlos Lacerda
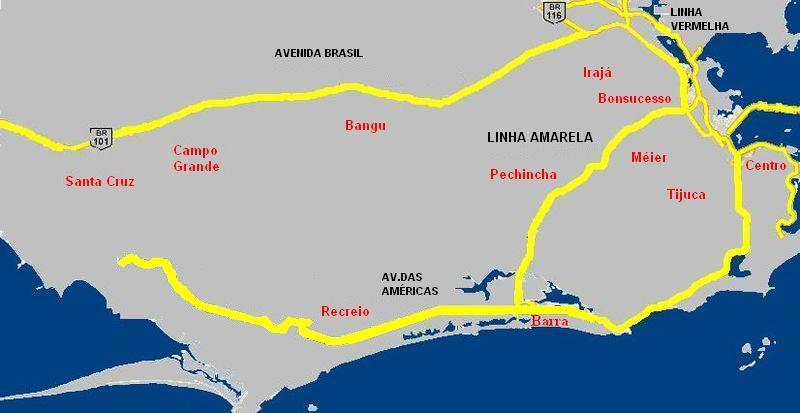

Route information
- Maintained by Linha Amarela S.A. (LAMSA)
- Length: 25 km (16 mi)
- Existed: 24 November 1997–present

Major junctions
- West end: Avenida Ayrton Senna in Jacarepaguá
- Av. Pastor Martin Luther King Junior (Avenida Automóvel Clube) Avenida Brasil (Rodovia Governador Mário Covas)
- East end: Red Line in Cidade Universitária

Location
- Country: Brazil
- State: Rio de Janeiro

Highway system
- Highways in Brazil; Federal

The Yellow Line (Portuguese: Linha Amarela) is an expressway linking Cidade Universitária and Jacarepaguá in Rio de Janeiro, Brazil. The road is officially known as Avenida Governador Carlos Lacerda.

== Junctions ==
The entire route is within the city of Rio de Janeiro.

Neighbourhood	Exit	Destinations	Notes
Jacarepaguá		Avenida Ayrton Senna - Barra da Tijuca, Jacarepaguá	Continues as Avenida Ayrton Senna towards Avenida das Américas
Jacarepaguá	1	Av. Geremário Dantas - Jacarepaguá, Freguesia, Pechincha, Tanque, Anil, Praça Seca, Grajaú	Eastbound only
Freguesia	1a	Estr. do Pau Ferro - Freguesia, Pechincha, Tanque, Praça Seca, Grajaú	Westbound only
Freguesia	1b	Av. Geremário Dantas - Freguesia	Westbound only
Méier	2	Eastbound: Méier, Engenho de Dentro, Água Santa, Maracanã, Encantado; Westbound: Méier, Água Santa, Cascadura, Tijuca, Encantado	
Engenho de Dentro	3	Eastbound: Engenho de Dentro, Méier, Madureira, Maracanã, Engenho Novo, Encantado, Abolição; Westbound: Rua Guilhermina - Engenho de Dentro, Rua Goiás, 24ª Delegacia de Polícia, Encantado, Piedade, Madureira	
Del Castilho	4	Eastbound: Av. Dom Hélder Câmara - Del Castilho, Pilares, Centro, Cachambi, Abolição, Norte Shopping; Westbound: Av. Dom Hélder Câmara - Del Castilho, Hospital Salgado Filho, Pilares, Cachambi, Méier, Norte Shopping	
Del Castilho	4a	Del Castilho	Eastbound only
Del Castilho	5	Eastbound: Avenida Pastor Martin Luther King Junior - Del Castilho, Maria da Graça, Vicente de Carvalho, Irajá; Westbound: Avenida Pastor Martin Luther King Junior - Del Castilho, Cemitério de Inhaúma, Maria da Graça, Largo do Bicão, Vicente de Carvalho	
Maria da Graça	6	Eastbound: Estr. Ademar Bebiano - Maria da Graça, Del Castilho, Inhaúma, Higienópolis, Bonsucesso; Westbound: Estr. Ademar Bebiano - Maria da Graça	
Bonsucesso	7	Eastbound: Av. dos Democráticos - Bonsucesso, Higienópolis, Ramos, Penha, São Cristóvão; Westbound: Av. dos Democráticos - Bonsucesso	
Bonsucesso	8	Eastbound: Av. Leopoldo Bulhões - Bonsucesso, Praça das Nações, Olaria, Benfica; Westbound: Av. Leopoldo Bulhões - Bonsucesso, Praça das Nações, Penha, Manguinhos, Benfica	
Manguinhos	9a	Av. Brasil (towards Centro) - Benfica, São Cristóvão, Caju, Centro, South Zone	Eastbound only
Maré	9b	Av. Brasil (towards West Zone) - Campo Grande, Baixada Fluminense, Serrana Microregion, BR-040;	Eastbound only
Maré	9c	Av. Brasil (towards West Zone) - Penha, Serrana Microregion, São Paulo	Westbound only
Bonsucesso	9d	Av. Brasil (towards Centro) - Benfica, São Cristóvão, Caju, Centro, South Zone	Westbound only
Maré	10a	Red Line (towards Centro) - Santos Dumont Airport, South Zone, São Cristóvão, Rio–Niterói Bridge, Lakes Microregion	Eastbound only
Cidade Universitária	10b	Red Line (towards Baixada Fluminense) - Rio de Janeiro–Galeão International Airport, Hospital do Fundão, Ilha do Governador, Serrana Microregion, São Paulo	Eastbound only
1.000 mi = 1.609 km; 1.000 km = 0.621 mi: Incomplete access
