= Engenho Novo =

- Neighborhood
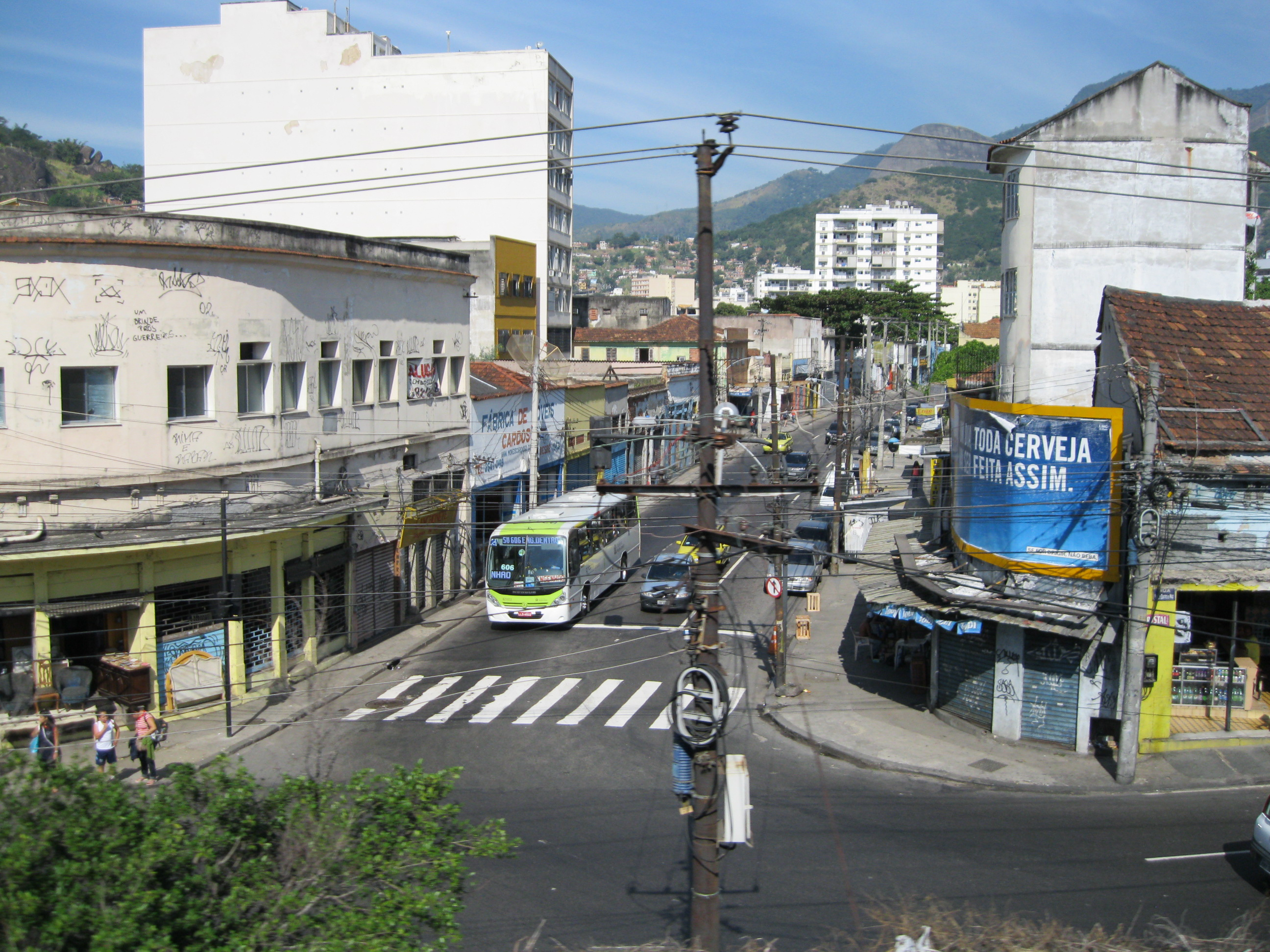

- Location in Rio de Janeiro Engenho Novo (Brazil)
- Coordinates: 22°54′29″S 43°16′05″W
- Country: Brazil
- State: Rio de Janeiro (RJ)
- Municipality/City: Rio de Janeiro
- Zone: North Zone
- Administrative Region: Méier

Area
  - Total: 264.48 ha (653.5 acres)

Population (2010)
  - Total: 42,172
  - Density: 15,945/km^{2} (41,298/sq mi)

Engenho Novo is a neighborhood of middle class and lower middle of the North Zone of Rio de Janeiro, Brazil.

The region's HDI, in 2000, was 0.858: the 45th best in the municipality of Rio de Janeiro.

It neighbors the neighborhoods Méier, Vila Isabel, Lins de Vasconcelos, Sampaio, Jacaré, Cachambi and Grajaú. It has 264.48 hectares of land area. It is part of a region called the Grande Méier encompassing the neighborhoods of the Abolição, Água Santa, Cachambi, Encantado, Engenho de Dentro, Jacaré, Lins de Vasconcelos, Méier, Piedade, Pilares, Riachuelo, Rocha, Sampaio, São Francisco Xavier and Todos os Santos. It is the fifth largest district population group.

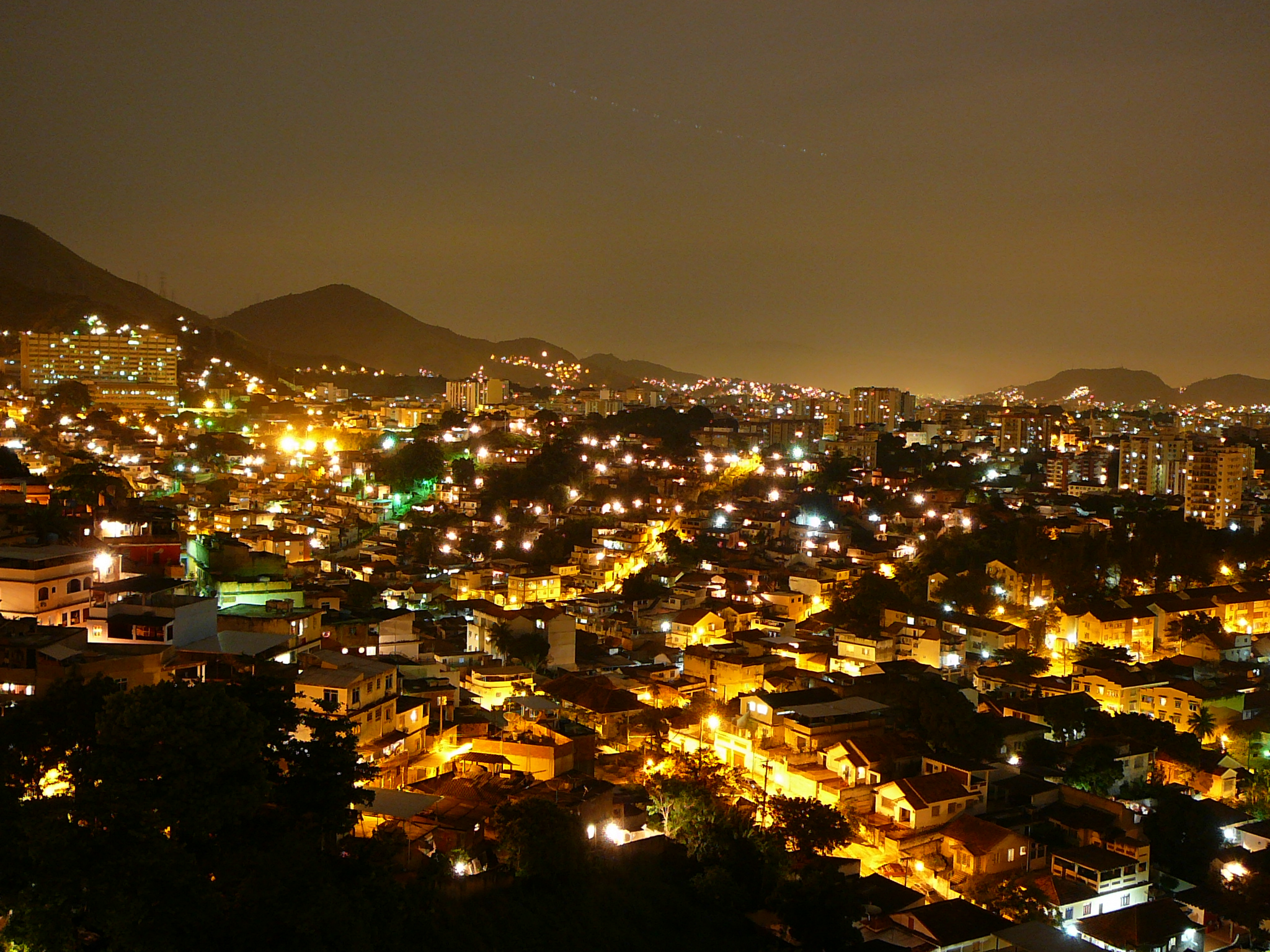
Night vision of Engenho novo.

The neighborhood is served by the Engenho Novo Station on the Deodoro Line of the Supervia rail network.

It is cut by the Rio Jacaré which is a river that is currently severely degraded by urbanization and consequent pollution.

In it is located a unit of the traditional Rio de Janeiro teaching establishment, Colégio Pedro II, there is also a Scout Group (81º Caetés) that completed 50 years in January 2008, the neighborhood also has two sports clubs, Clube Lins and Vitória Tênis Club and also has the Celso Lisboa University Center.

It is an economically stagnant neighborhood because it suffers from the lack of investments in the area. The degraded landscape and the violence are due to repeated police attacks against residents of the favelas located in its perimeter and surroundings, namely: Matriz, São João, Céu Azul, Rato Molhado, Encontro, in addition to part of the Lins Complex.

A series of Pacifying Police Units were installed in the neighborhood in 2011, but at the beginning of 2017 they were withdrawn and there is no longer any pacification in the communities of these neighborhoods, due to the government crisis. The residences, in general, are old and decaying. Poorly maintained streets and poor security. Absence of cultural and recreational infrastructure, etc., meaning that its residents have to move to Méier or to the Tijuca region (nearby neighborhoods with better infrastructure).

The Engenho Novo Residents' Association is one of the most active in the city.

== History ==
The occupation of the region known today as Grande Méier began when Estácio de Sá donated the Sesmaria de Iguaçu to the Jesuit priests. The lands encompassed the current neighborhoods of Grande Méier and others such as Catumbi, Tijuca, Benfica and São Cristóvão. In them, the Jesuits installed three sugar mills: Engenho Velho, Engenho Novo and São Cristóvão.

The construction, in 1720, of a chapel dedicated to São Miguel and Nossa Senhora da Conceição, in Engenho Novo, boosted the growth of the area.

Over time, the chapel underwent several structural modifications and currently houses an exhibition of human remains dating from the period of transatlantic slavery.

In 1759, when the Jesuits were expelled from Brazil, their lands passed into the hands of Manuel Gomes, Manuel da Silva and Manuel Teixeira. With the aim of exploiting wood and growing vegetables, the existing forests were devastated, forming large empty spaces that would allow the occupation of the soil.

A significant part of Engenho Novo would be called Quinta dos Duques, due to the acquisition of this region by the family of Duque-Estrada de Itaboraí. This same family would send, in 1815, an application to Dom João VI asking for the concession of the surrounding vacant lands – currently known as Manguinhos

Freed slaves built precarious dwellings in Morro dos Pretos Forros, a region currently covered by the Grajaú-Jacarepaguá highway, expanding occupation of the region. Later, colonization was accelerated with the discovery of gold in the region.

The Parish of Nossa Senhora da Conceição do Engenho Novo was created in 1783, boosting the development of the region. Until the Second Empire, farms and ranches multiplied. Trade was developing around the old mills.

== Engenho novo's train station ==
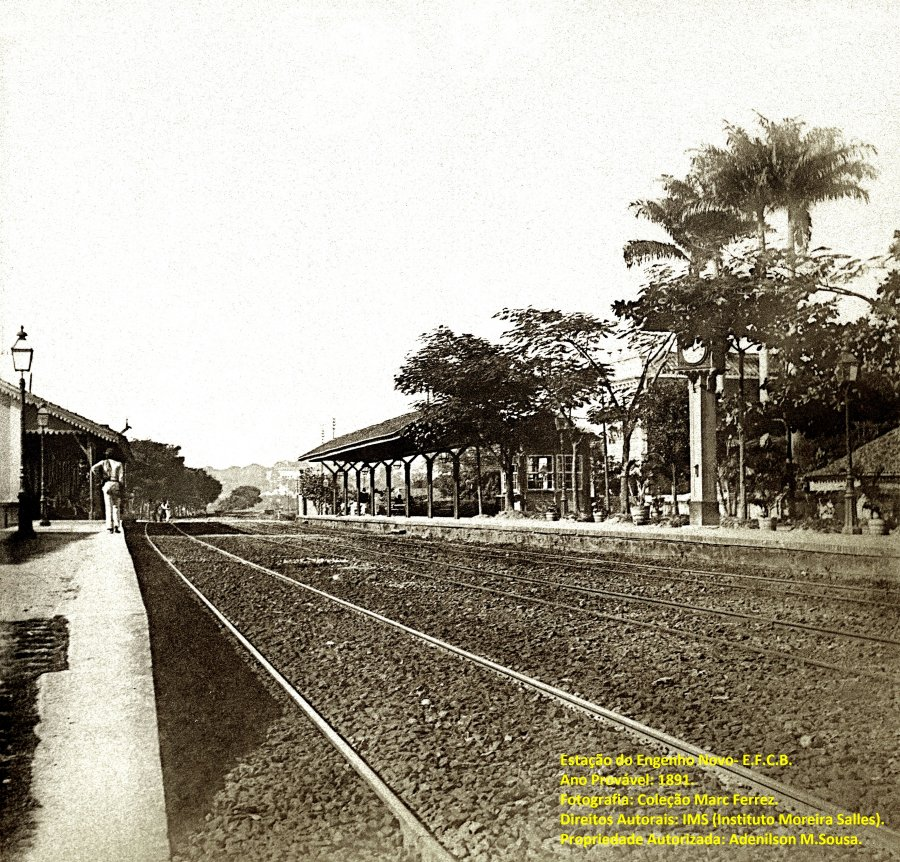

The Engenho Novo station, opened in 1858 by the then Dom Pedro II Railroad, which in 1889 was renamed Central Railroad Brasil, was decisive for the occupation of the neighborhood. From then on, the lands were subdivided and the streets (opened in almost all terrains swampy) were being cleaned up.

Accident at the station injures several passengers (A Provincia de S. Paulo, 22 March 1882)

"On March 29, 1858, at ten thirty minutes in the morning, the first train of the Estrada de Ferro D.Pedro II departed from Campo da Aclamação, in the eyes of the 'happy and jubilant people' that surrounded the station and the road to Queimados. According to a reporter from Jornal do Comércio, the inauguration party for the railway had agitated the population on the inaugural journey, which lasted an hour and forty minutes".

Wrote historian Elaina Serfaty in the book By the Suburban Train, by the General Archive of the City of Rio de Janeiro. With the train station, the neighborhood was drastically changed. It became the gateway to the North Zone. Trade grew. The number of residents grew. The economy grew. Sanitation has arrived.

In 1903, the development of the Region accelerated, with emphasis on the side of Méier station where a solid trade was formed. Important business houses and magazines emerged that attracted people from all over the City. The neighborhood has one of the units of one of the most famous public schools in the state, Colégio Pedro II. Founded in March 1952, as one of the Externato Sections of the CPII, in the building where the Colégio Independência had operated until then, located on Rua Barão do Bom Retiro, which connects the neighborhood to Grajaú. The campus Engenho Novo I began its activities in 1986, built in the former guild building of the campus Engenho Novo II.

== Culture ==
- The pagode group Revelação emerged in this neighborhood in the early 1990s, making a career leap in the block Arranco do Engenho de Dentro, and is now one of the most successful groups in Brazil.
- The singer of the band "O Rappa", Marcelo Falcão was born and raised in the Engenho Novo neighborhood, in the city of Rio de Janeiro. Falcão attended primary school at Colégio Salesiano do Riachuelo, close to where he lived, in Engenho Novo.
- The youtuber Felipe Neto was born and raised in Buraco do Padre part of the Engenho Novo neighborhood.

== Weather ==
The city of Rio de Janeiro has a tropical savannah climate (Aw). According to the Köppen-Geiger climate classification, generally characterized by long periods of heavy rain between December and March. The city experiences hot, humid summers and warm, sunny winters. Temperatures above 35 °C are common during the summer, although rarely for long periods, while maximum temperatures above 23 °C can occur monthly.

Climate data for Engenho novo (1970–2023)
| Month | Jan | Feb | Mar | Apr | May | Jun | Jul | Aug | Sep | Oct | Nov | Dec | Year |
|---|---|---|---|---|---|---|---|---|---|---|---|---|---|
| Mean daily maximum °C (°F) | 31 (88) | 31 (88) | 31 (88) | 29 (84) | 28 (82) | 26 (79) | 26 (79) | 26 (79) | 26 (79) | 27 (81) | 27 (81) | 30 (86) | 28 (83) |
| Mean daily minimum °C (°F) | 18 (64) | 21 (70) | 22 (72) | 21 (70) | 20 (68) | 17 (63) | 16 (61) | 15 (59) | 16 (61) | 17 (63) | 19 (66) | 20 (68) | 19 (65) |
| Average precipitation mm (inches) | 120 (4.7) | 130 (5.1) | 110 (4.3) | 90 (3.5) | 90 (3.5) | 60 (2.4) | 30 (1.2) | 30 (1.2) | 20 (0.8) | 60 (2.4) | 70 (2.8) | 100 (3.9) | 910 (35.8) |
Source: www.weatherbase.com
