= 1924 Campeonato Carioca =

In the 1924 season of the Campeonato Carioca, two championships were disputed, each by a different league.

== AMEA Championship ==
Campeonato Carioca
- Season: 1924
- Champions: Fluminense
- Matches: 56
- Goals: 259 (4.63 per match)
- Top goalscorer: Nilo (Fluminense) – 28 goals
- Biggest home win: Flamengo 7-0 Brasil (August 10, 1924); Fluminense 7-0 Brasil (October 12, 1924)
- Biggest away win: Brasil 1-7 Fluminense (June 1, 1924)
- Highest scoring: Brasil 5-7 Bangu (July 6, 1924)

After Vasco da Gama's title in 1923, the larger clubs within LMDT attempted to pressure Vasco da Gama to exclude twelve black players from their team, accusing them of being professionals. When Vasco refused and LMDT took Vasco's side, these clubs split from the league and founded AMEA (Associação Metropolitana de Esportes Atléticos, or Metropolitan Athletic Sports Association); Most of the clubs that had been participating in the Série A joined the league, with the addition of SC Brasil, from Série B, and the recently promoted Hellênico. The league at the time also had CBD's official backing.

The edition of the Campeonato Carioca organized by AMEA kicked off on May 4, 1924 and ended on October 19, 1924. Eight teams participated, Fluminense won the championship for the 9th time. no teams were relegated.

=== Participating teams ===
Club	Home location	Previous season
América	Tijuca, Rio de Janeiro	5th
Bangu	Bangu, Rio de Janeiro	7th
Botafogo	Botafogo, Rio de Janeiro	8th
Brasil	Urca, Rio de Janeiro	14th
Flamengo	Flamengo, Rio de Janeiro	2nd
Fluminense	Laranjeiras, Rio de Janeiro	4th
Hellênico	Rio Comprido, Rio de Janeiro	1st (Second level)
São Cristóvão	São Cristóvão, Rio de Janeiro	3rd

=== System ===
The tournament would be disputed in a double round-robin format, with the team with the most points winning the title.

=== Championship ===
Pos	Team	Pld	W	D	L	GF	GA	GD	Pts	Qualification or relegation
1	Fluminense	14	12	1	1	54	19	+35	25	Champions
2	Flamengo	14	10	2	2	44	21	+23	22	
3	São Cristóvão	14	6	4	4	30	25	+5	16	
4	Botafogo	14	7	1	6	24	20	+4	15	
5	Bangu	14	6	1	7	38	39	−1	13	
6	América	14	4	2	8	21	34	−13	10	
7	Hellênico	14	4	1	9	26	37	−11	9	
8	Brasil	14	1	0	13	22	64	−42	2	

Updated to match(es) played on October 19, 1924. Source: RSSSF.com
Rules for classification: 1) points; 2) goal difference; 3) wins; 4) number of goals scored.

== LMDT Championship ==
Campeonato Carioca
- Season: 1924
- Champions: Vasco da Gama
- Matches: 152
- Goals: 542 (3.57 per match)
- Top goalscorer: Telê (Andarahy) – 17 goals
- Biggest home win: Engenho de Dentro 14-1 Ramos (October 19, 1924)
- Biggest away win: Mackenzie 1-9 Andarahy (October 26, 1924)
- Highest scoring: Engenho de Dentro 14-1 Ramos (October 19, 1924)

The edition of the Campeonato Carioca organized by LMDT (Liga Metropolitana de Desportos Terrestres, or Metropolitan Land Sports League) kicked off on May 25, 1924 and ended on November 30, 1924. Twenty-three teams participated. Vasco da Gama won the championship for the 2nd time. no teams were relegated.

=== Participating teams ===
Club	Home location	Previous season
Americano	Engenho de Dentro, Rio de Janeiro	16th
Andarahy	Andaraí, Rio de Janeiro	6th
Bomsuccesso	Bonsucesso, Rio de Janeiro	3rd (Second level)
Campo Grande	Campo Grande, Rio de Janeiro	13th (Second level)
Carioca	Jardim Botânico, Rio de Janeiro	11th
Confiança	Andaraí, Rio de Janeiro	4th (Second level)
Engenho de Dentro	Engenho de Dentro, Rio de Janeiro	–
Esperança	Santa Cruz, Rio de Janeiro	6th (Second level)
Everest	Inhaúma, Rio de Janeiro	10th (Second level)
Fidalgo	Madureira, Rio de Janeiro	9th (Second level)
Independência	Pilares, Rio de Janeiro	11th (Second level)
Mackenzie	Méier, Rio de Janeiro	12th
Mangueira	Tijuca, Rio de Janeiro	10th
Metropolitano	Méier, Rio de Janeiro	2nd (Second level)
Modesto	Quintino Bocaiúva, Rio de Janeiro	12th (Second level)
Olaria	Olaria, Rio de Janeiro	–
Palmeiras	São Cristóvão, Rio de Janeiro	15th
Progresso	Centro, Rio de Janeiro	7th (Second level)
Ramos	Ramos, Rio de Janeiro	16th (Second level)
River	Piedade, Rio de Janeiro	13th
São Paulo-Rio	Catumbi, Rio de Janeiro	5th (Second level)
Vasco da Gama	São Cristóvão, Rio de Janeiro	1st
Villa Isabel	Vila Isabel, Rio de Janeiro	9th

=== System ===
The tournament would be disputed in two stages:

- First stage: The twenty-three teams would be divided into three groups: Série A, Série B and Série C, with their participants being defined by their standings in the previous year's league. The teams in each group played each other in a double round-robin format. The champions of each of the Séries would qualify into the Finals.
- Final stage: The champions of Séries A and C would face each other, and the winner would play against the champions of the Série B to define the champion.

=== Championship ===
==== Série A ====
Pos	Team	Pld	W	D	L	GF	GA	GD	Pts	Qualification or relegation
1	Vasco da Gama	14	14	0	0	40	9	+31	28	Qualified
2	Andarahy	14	10	2	2	44	17	+27	22	
3	Villa Isabel	14	7	2	5	29	15	+14	16	
4	River	14	5	3	6	20	25	−5	13	
5	Carioca	14	4	4	6	18	21	−3	12	
6	Mackenzie	14	3	2	9	23	38	−15	8	
7	Mangueira	14	3	2	9	12	28	−16	8	
8	Palmeiras	14	1	3	10	16	49	−33	5	

Updated to match(es) played on November 2, 1924. Source: RSSSF.com
Rules for classification: 1) points; 2) goal difference; 3) wins; 4) number of goals scored.

==== Série B ====
Pos	Team	Pld	W	D	L	GF	GA	GD	Pts	Qualification or relegation
1	Bomsuccesso	14	11	2	1	38	18	+20	24	Qualified
2	São Paulo-Rio	14	9	1	4	22	16	+6	19	
3	Fidalgo	14	8	2	4	23	16	+7	18	
4	Metropolitano	14	7	2	5	20	20	0	16	
5	Confiança	14	5	5	4	27	23	+4	15	
6	Americano	14	4	2	8	20	24	−4	10	
7	Esperança	14	3	2	9	21	33	−12	8	
8	Progresso	14	0	2	12	11	32	−21	2	

Updated to match(es) played on November 2, 1924. Source: RSSSF.com
Rules for classification: 1) points; 2) goal difference; 3) wins; 4) number of goals scored.

==== Série C ====
Pos	Team	Pld	W	D	L	GF	GA	GD	Pts	Qualification or relegation
1	Engenho de Dentro	12	10	2	0	39	10	+29	22	Qualified
2	Modesto	12	8	2	2	34	12	+22	18	
3	Everest	12	7	3	2	24	16	+8	17	
4	Campo Grande	12	5	0	7	11	14	−3	10	
5	Olaria	12	3	2	7	16	26	−10	8	
6	Independência	12	2	1	9	19	23	−4	5	
7	Ramos	12	2	0	10	9	51	−42	4	

Updated to match(es) played on November 2, 1924. Source: RSSSF.com
Rules for classification: 1) points; 2) goal difference; 3) wins; 4) number of goals scored.

==== Final stage ====
===== Semifinals =====
23 November 1924

Vasco da Gama	5 – 0	Engenho de Dentro
Torteroli; Paschoal; Cecy; Negrito

Rua Prefeito Serzedello Corrêa, Rio de Janeiro

===== Finals =====
30 November 1924

Vasco da Gama	1 – 0	Bomsuccesso
Cecy

Rua Prefeito Serzedello Corrêa, Rio de Janeiro
Referee: Eduardo Pinto da Fonseca
