= Red Line (Rio de Janeiro) =

RJ-071
- Red Line; Via Expressa Presidente João Goulart

Route information
- Length: 25 km (16 mi)
- Existed: 15 April 1978 (First phase); 30 April 1992 (Second phase); 11 September 1994 (Third phase)–present

Major junctions
- North end: Rod. Pres. Dutra in São João de Meriti
- Avenida Presidente Kennedy; BR-040; Yellow Line; Avenida Brasil
- South end: Rebouças Tunnel in Rio de Janeiro

Location
- Country: Brazil
- State: Rio de Janeiro

Highway system
- Highways in Brazil; Federal

The Red Line (Portuguese: Linha Vermelha), also called President João Goulart expressway, is an expressway in connecting São João de Meriti and Rio de Janeiro.

The first stage of the road was opened in 1978.

== Junctions ==
Municipality	Neighbourhood	Destinations	Notes
Rio de Janeiro	Pavuna	Rodovia Presidente Dutra - Baixada Fluminense, São Paulo	
Duque de Caxias	Duque de Caxias	Avenida Doutor Manoel Teles - Centro, Duque de Caxias	
Duque de Caxias	Duque de Caxias	Avenida Presidente Kennedy - Centro, Duque de Caxias	
Duque de Caxias	Duque de Caxias	BR-040 - Magé, Petrópolis, Teresópolis, Juiz de Fora and Belo Horizonte	
Rio de Janeiro	Galeão	Estrada do Galeão - Rio de Janeiro–Galeão International Airport, Ilha do Governador	
Rio de Janeiro	Cidade Universitária	Ilha do Fundão	
Rio de Janeiro	Maré	Complexo da Maré	
Rio de Janeiro	Maré	Yellow Line - Méier, Jacarepaguá and Barra da Tijuca	
Rio de Janeiro	Caju	Avenida Brasil	
Rio de Janeiro	Caju	Viaduto Professor Mário Henrique Simonsen	
Rio de Janeiro	Caju	Rio–Niterói Bridge - Niterói, Lakes Microregion, Vitória	
Rio de Janeiro	Caju	Via Binário	
Rio de Janeiro	São Cristóvão	Campo de São Cristóvão	
Rio de Janeiro	São Cristóvão	Rua Francisco Eugênio	
Rio de Janeiro	Rio Comprido	Túnel Rebouças - South Zone	
1.000 mi = 1.609 km; 1.000 km = 0.621 mi: Incomplete access
