= Aracy de Almeida =

Brazilian singer (1914–1988)

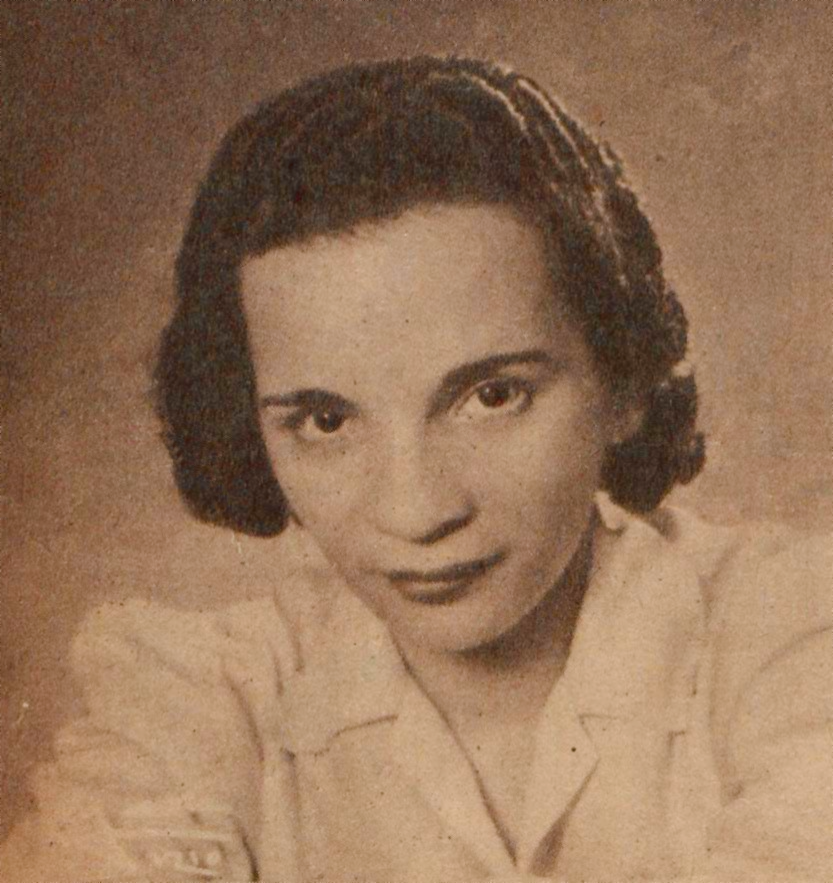
- Araci de Almeida in 1945
- Born: Aracy Teles de Almeida; August 19, 1914; Rio de Janeiro, DF, Brazil
- Died: June 20, 1988 (aged 73); Rio de Janeiro, Brazil
- Other names: Dama da Central, Dama do Encantado, O Samba em Pessoa
- Occupation: Singer
- Musical career
- Origin: Encantado, Rio de Janeiro, Brazil
- Genres: Samba
- Years active: 1933–1988

Aracy de Almeida Portuguese pronunciation: [aɾaˈsi dʒi awˈmejdɐ] (August 19, 1914 – June 20, 1988) was a Brazilian singer, known as a famous artist of the Golden Age of Brazilian radio. Her 1950 album Noel Rosa e Aracy de Almeida was voted by Rolling Stone one of the greatest Brazilian albums of all time.

== Early life ==
Aracy Teles de Almeida was born on August 19, 1914. She was raised in Encantado, a suburb of Rio de Janeiro, in a large Protestant family. Her father, Baltazar Teles de Almeida, was a Central do Brasil train conductor, and her mother, Mrs. Hermogênea, was a housewife. She had only male siblings.

She studied in a school in the neighborhood of Engenho de Dentro, where she was a classmate of the radio broadcaster Alziro Zarur, later moving to Colégio Nacional, in Méier. Aracy would sing religious hymns at her local Baptist Church and, in secrecy from her parents, would sing songs of Candomblé deities at their places of worship and in carnival blocks.
