= 2024 Brazilian football match-fixing scandal =

2024 Match-fixing scandal in Brazil

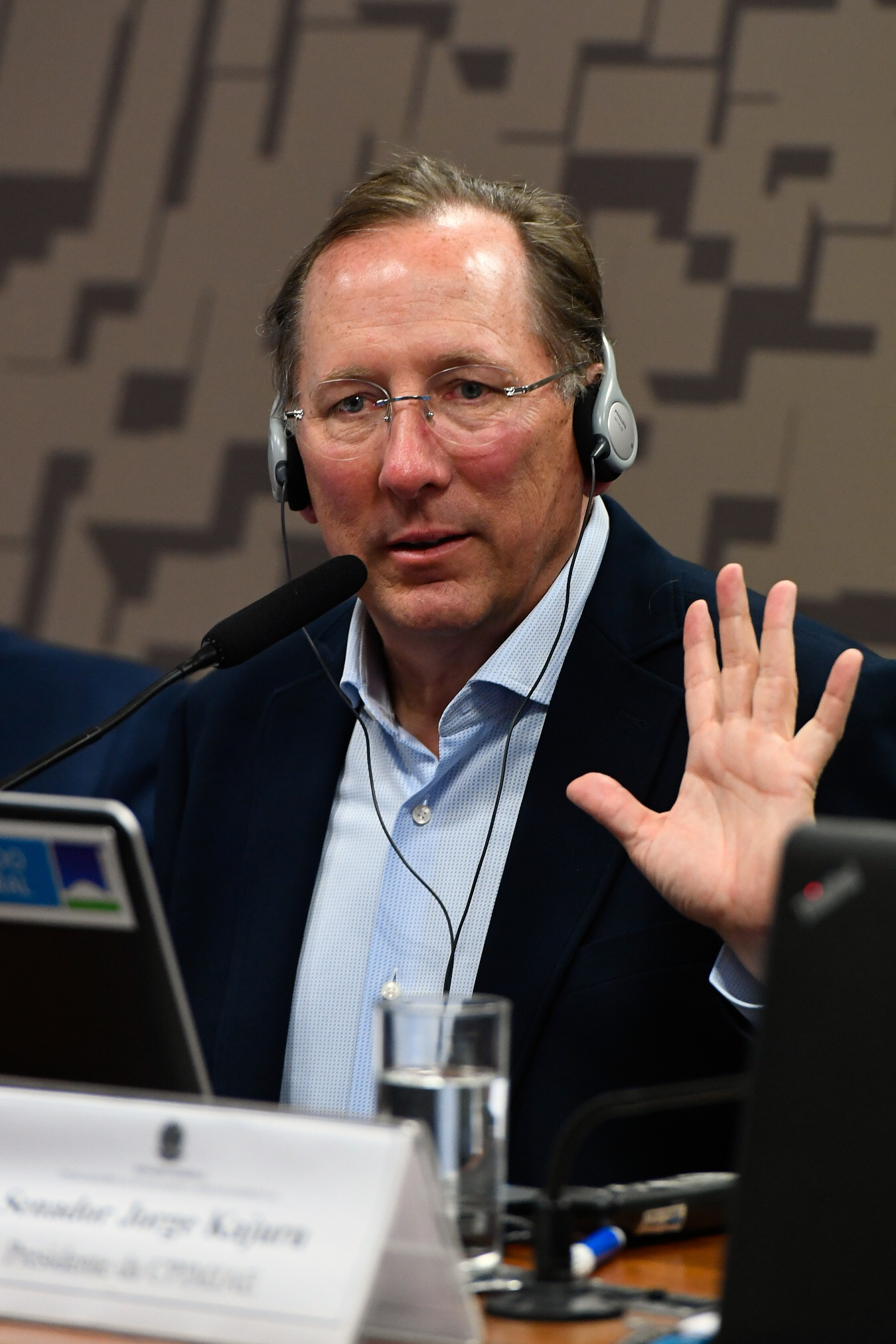
Textor speaking about allegations and suspicions of manipulation of results in Brazilian football, involving players, managers and betting companies in April 2024.

Since 2023, after the Botafogo team failed to maintain its lead and saw Palmeiras overtake them in the Campeonato Brasileiro in the last rounds, John Textor has made numerous accusations in the press that the championship has suffered from manipulation of results and refereeing errors, for which his team would have been harmed; To give greater veracity to his statements, Textor ended up hiring a French company, specialized in game analysis and arbitration to verify the matches. In the complaints, he also accused football referees of receiving agreed bribes. However, such accusations were not presented to the competent bodies. The businessman also accused Fortaleza, Palmeiras and São Paulo, without presenting evidence, of colluding to harm Botafogo. Textor was then denounced by the Superior Tribunal de Justiça Desportiva for bad faith litigation and false accusation of crime, and the trial was scheduled for 15 April 2024. Textor had been given a deadline to deliver the alleged allegations to the magistrates, however, he did not comply with them. Hours after the STJD's decision, Textor handed over the alleged evidence to the Cidade da Polícia located in Benfica in Rio de Janeiro because according to the businessman, the sports tribunal did not have the competence to investigate this lawsuit. However, senators who were members of the CPI on Manipulation of Results, which took place in 2023, asked the Brazilian police to interrogate him and present such evidence.

On 22 April 2024, Textor stated during the CPI do Senado meeting that "Manipulation of results in football is reality".

== See also ==
- 2005 Brazilian football match-fixing scandal
- 2023 Brazilian football match-fixing scandal
- Apito Dourado (Golden Whistle), a Portuguese football corruption scandal
- Calciopoli
