= Benfica, Rio de Janeiro =

Benfica
- Neighborhood
- Location in Rio de Janeiro Benfica (Brazil)
- Coordinates: 22°53′33″S 43°14′24″W
- Country: Brazil
- State: Rio de Janeiro (RJ)
- Municipality/City: Rio de Janeiro
- Zone: Centro

Population (2010)
  - Total: 25,081

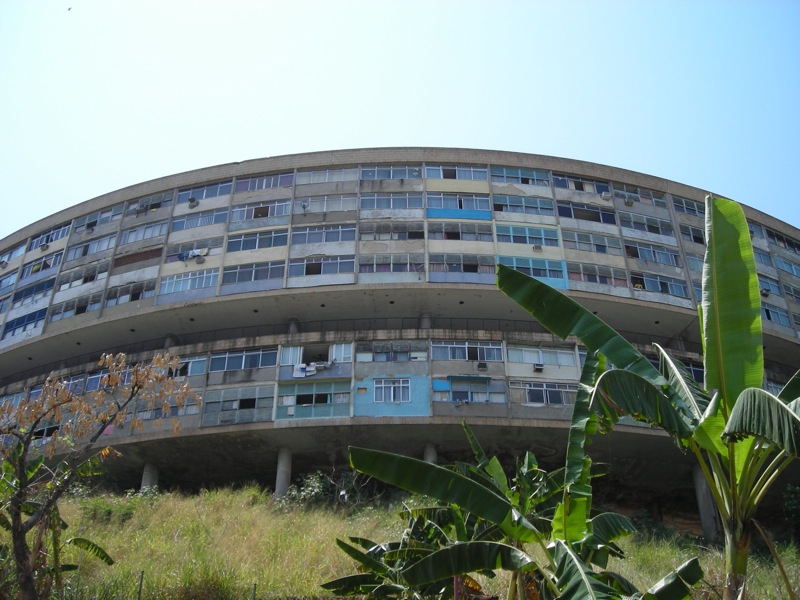
The Mendes de Moraes housing project, built to serve civil workers of the Rio de Janeiro city government, in Benfica, may be seen from the Avenida Brasil

Benfica is a neighborhood in the North Zone of Rio de Janeiro, Brazil. It is located near São Cristóvão and Engenho de Dentro, within the Centro (Downtown) Administrative Region.

Benfica was first populated in the 16th century, as an area of sugarcane plantation developed by Jesuit missionaries, who received an extensive donation of land, which also included present-day Engenho da Rainha and Engenho Novo, from Estácio de Sá. After the jesuits were expelled from the Portuguese Empire by the marquis of Pombal, in 1759, possessions in Benfica were granted to various private owners, and the region became further populated.

The neighbourhood has historically played a role as a resting place and point of passage to places of interest in the outskirts of Rio, most notably on the Estrada Real (Royal Road). Today, Benfica is served by the Avenida Brasil and Avenida Dom Hélder Câmara, two avenues which link downtown Rio to suburbs in the North and West Zones.
