= Engenho de Dentro =

- Neighborhood
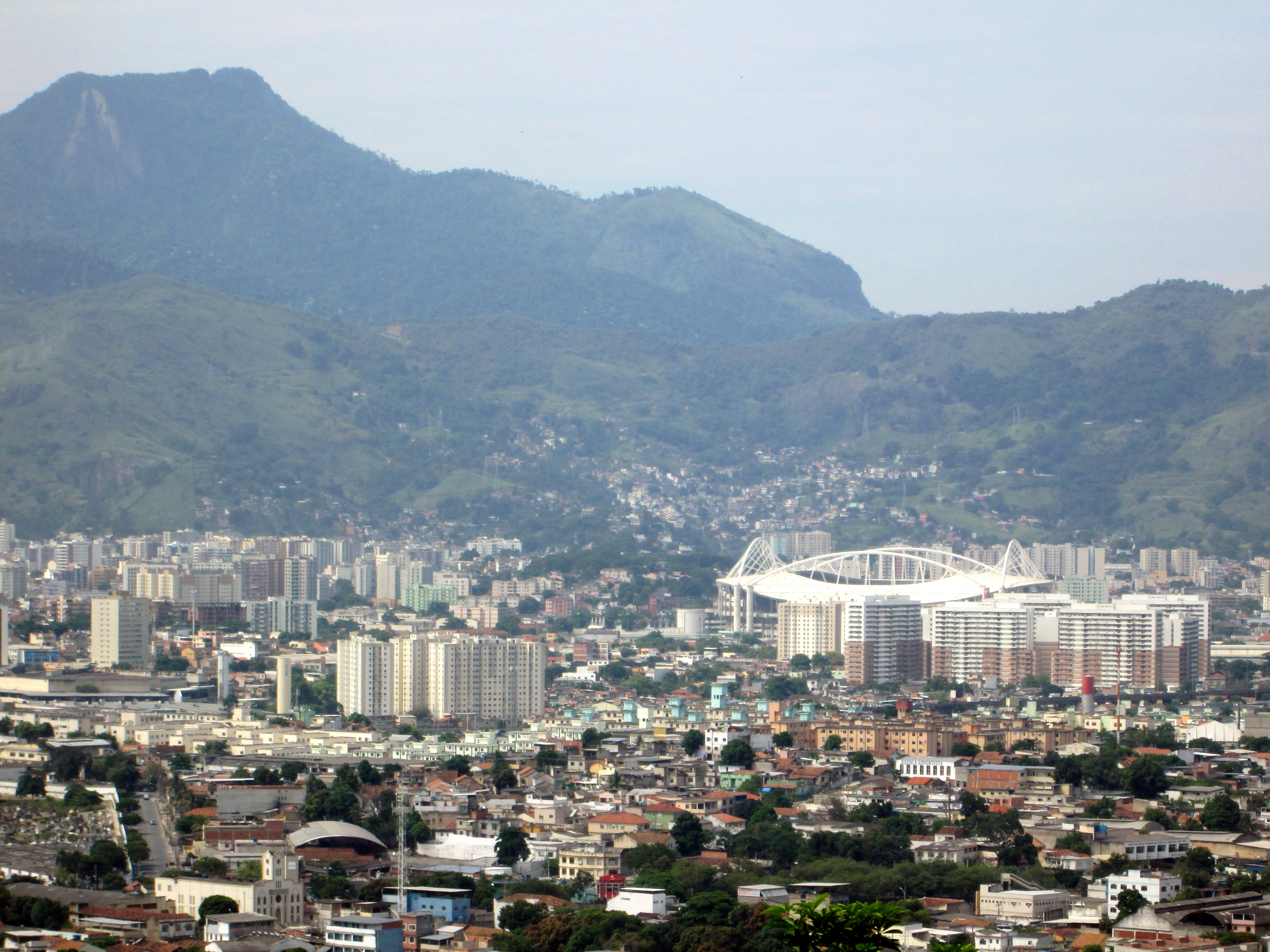

- Location in Rio de Janeiro Engenho de Dentro (Brazil)
- Coordinates: 22°54′07″S 43°17′44″W
- Country: Brazil
- State: Rio de Janeiro (RJ)
- Municipality/City: Rio de Janeiro
- Zone: North Zone

Population (2010)
  - Total: 45,540

Engenho de Dentro is a middle-class and lower-middle-class neighbourhood in the North Zone of Rio de Janeiro, Brazil. It borders the neighbourhoods of Abolição, Água Santa, Cachambi, Encantado, Inhaúma, Lins de Vasconcelos, Méier, Pilares and Todos os Santos. The Nilton Santos Olympic Stadium, home stadium of Botafogo F.R. and one of the venues of the 2007 Pan American Games, 2016 Summer Olympics and Paralympics, is situated in Engenho de Dentro. The Olímpica de Engenho de Dentro station is the SuperVia train station in Rio de Janeiro that serves this neighborhood. From Central do Brasil station, passengers can reach Engenho de Dentro neighbourhood and Nilton Santos stadium in 25 minutes taking the Japeri, Santa Cruz or Deodoro lines, leaving the train in Olímpica de Engenho de Dentro station.

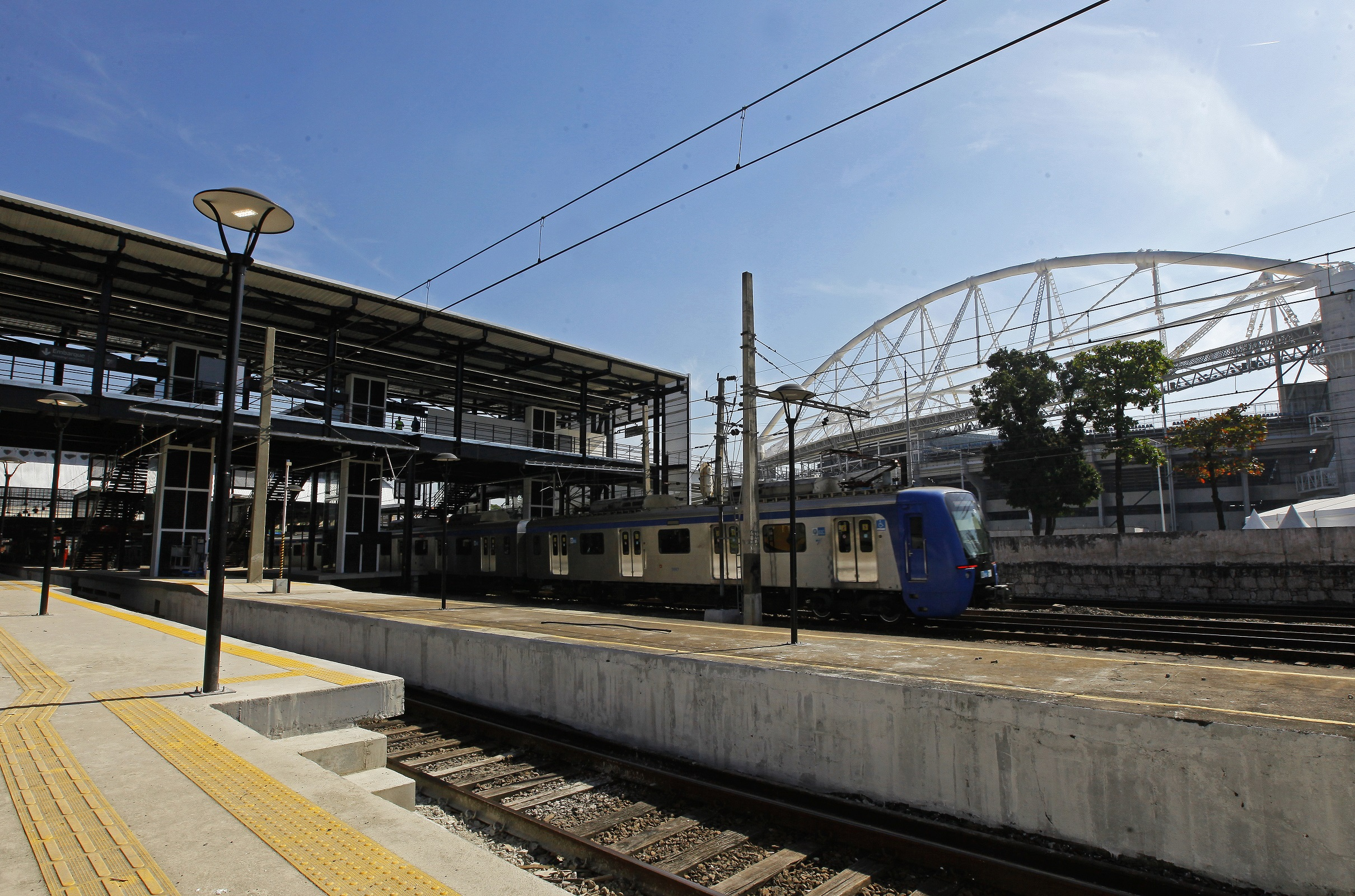
Engenho de Dentro station and Nilton Santos Stadium
