= Quinta da Boa Vista =

Public park in Rio de Janeiro, Brazil

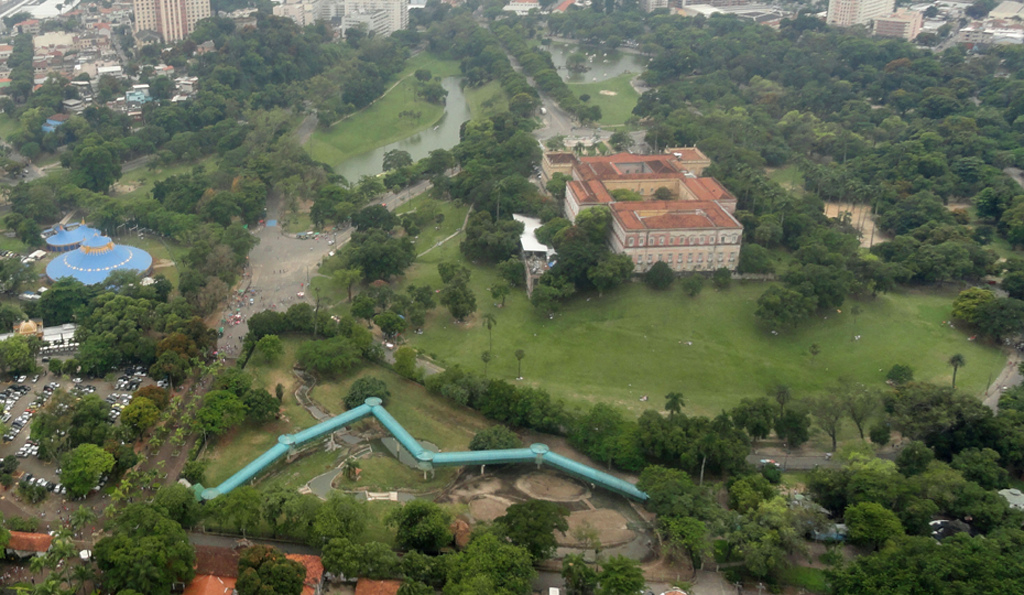
- Interactive map of Quinta da Boa Vista
- Type: Urban park
- Location: Rio de Janeiro, Brazil
- Coordinates: 22°54′21″S 43°13′28″W
- Area: 517,541.26 square metres (5,570,767.8 ft^{2})
- Created: 1808
- Operator: Prefecture of Rio de Janeiro

The Quinta da Boa Vista (English: "Estate of the Good View") is a public park of great historical importance located in the São Cristóvão neighbourhood, in the North zone of the city of Rio de Janeiro, Brazil. The park was part of the gardens of the São Cristóvão Palace, the residence of the King of Portugal and then the Emperors of Brazil in the 19th century and the home of the Zoological Garden of Rio de Janeiro, with over 2000 species of animals. The building of the old palace hosted the National Museum, with collections on natural history, ethnology and archaeology.

== History ==
=== Origins ===
The area now occupied by the Quinta da Boa Vista used to be part of a Jesuit farm. After 1759, when the Jesuits were expelled from colonial Brazil, the land was divided and given to private landlords. In the early 19th century, part of the farm belonged to Elias António Lopes, a rich Portuguese merchant, who around 1803 built a manor house on top of a hill. From this hill one could appreciate a wonderful view of the Guanabara Bay, hence the name Boa Vista (nice view) of the Quinta.

When prince regent John VI and the Portuguese court arrived in Rio de Janeiro, in 1808, Elias António Lopes donated his farm to the Prince. John VI appreciated very much the gift, and stayed long periods in the manor house. At the time, the farm was located relatively far from the city of Rio de Janeiro, and was surrounded by mangroves and swamps. Later these had to be eliminated to facilitate the access to the city.

=== Imperial Palace ===
To better accommodate the Portuguese Royal Family, the house went through a renovation between 1816 and 1821, directed by English architect John Johnston. In front of the palace, Johnston installed a decorative gate, a gift sent from England to Brazil by Hugh Percy, 2nd Duke of Northumberland. The gate was later transferred to the entrance of the zoological garden of the Quinta. The house became known as the Paço de São Cristóvão (English: Palace of Saint Christopher).

After the declaration of the Republic of Brazil, the Imperial family left the country and the Palace and its surrounding gardens became empty.

== The Quinta today ==
The Quinta da Boa Vista is a very popular attraction for locals and also tourists. The fact that the North zone of Rio de Janeiro, where the Quinta is located, has very few public parks only contributes to its popularity. The main attractions are the park itself, with its green areas, centenary trees and lakes, as well as the National Museum and the Zoological Garden.

=== National Museum ===
Founded in 1818 by King John VI of Portugal, the National Museum was transferred to the old Imperial Palace of the Quinta in 1892. During its long history, its collections have been greatly expanded by acquisitions and donations, including by Emperor Pedro II, a great sponsor of the sciences. The collections included Astronomy (mostly meteorites), Palaeontology, Natural history, Ethnology (including many interesting works by Brazilian indigenous peoples) and Archaeology (mostly antiquities from ancient Egypt).

Much of the art collection displayed by the Museum consisted of what was gathered by the Emperor Pedro II himself. In this manner, it reflects 19th-century views of Anthropology, Archaeology and sciences in general. Additionally, as is the case with the building, the collection was poorly preserved.

Until the September 2018 fire, visitors could also see a few rooms of the ancient Palace with its original painted and stucco decoration, like the Throne Room, the Ambassadors' Room and the room of Empress Teresa Cristina. These rooms displayed a couple original pieces but were overall empty.

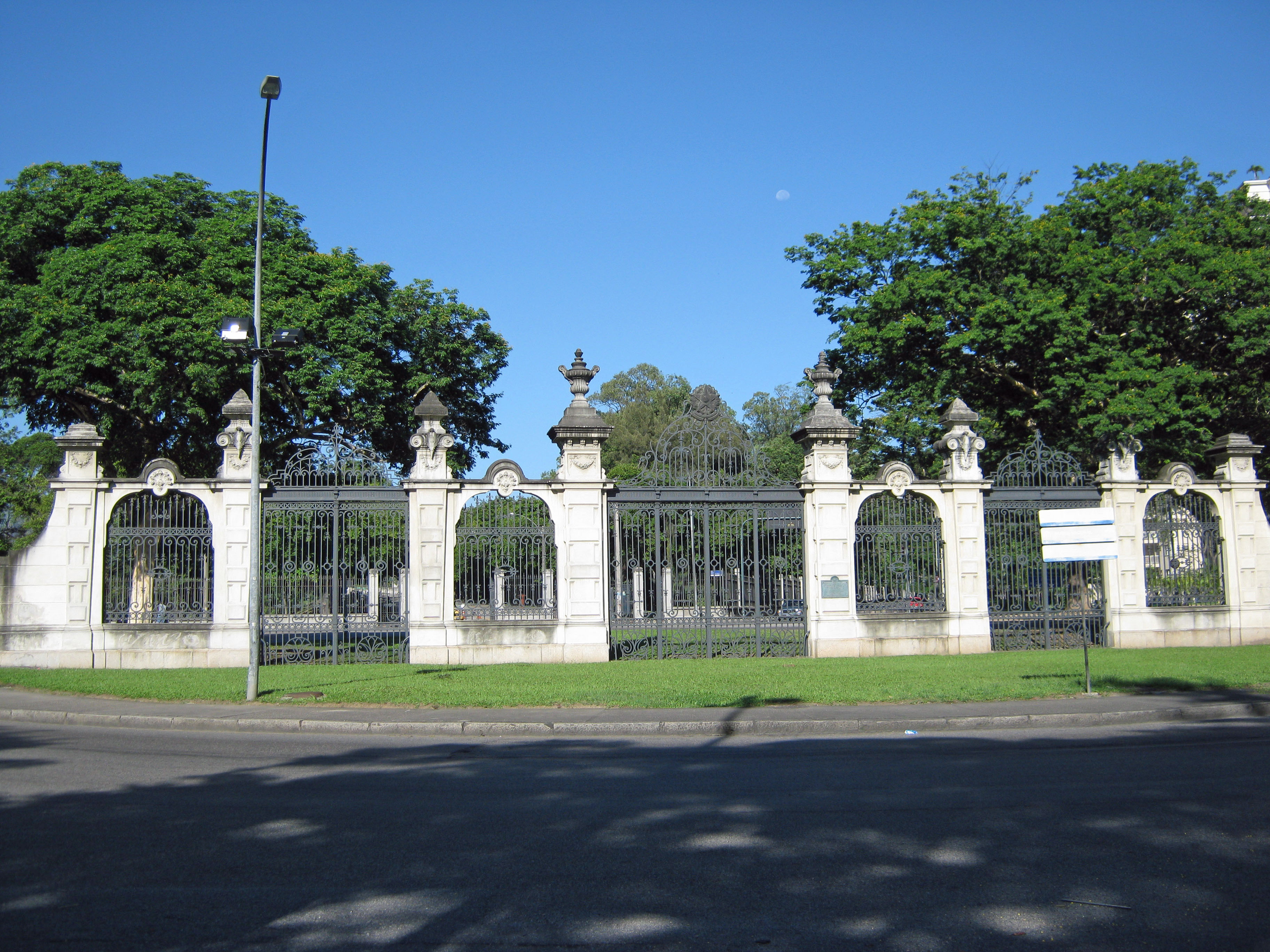
Entrance Gate

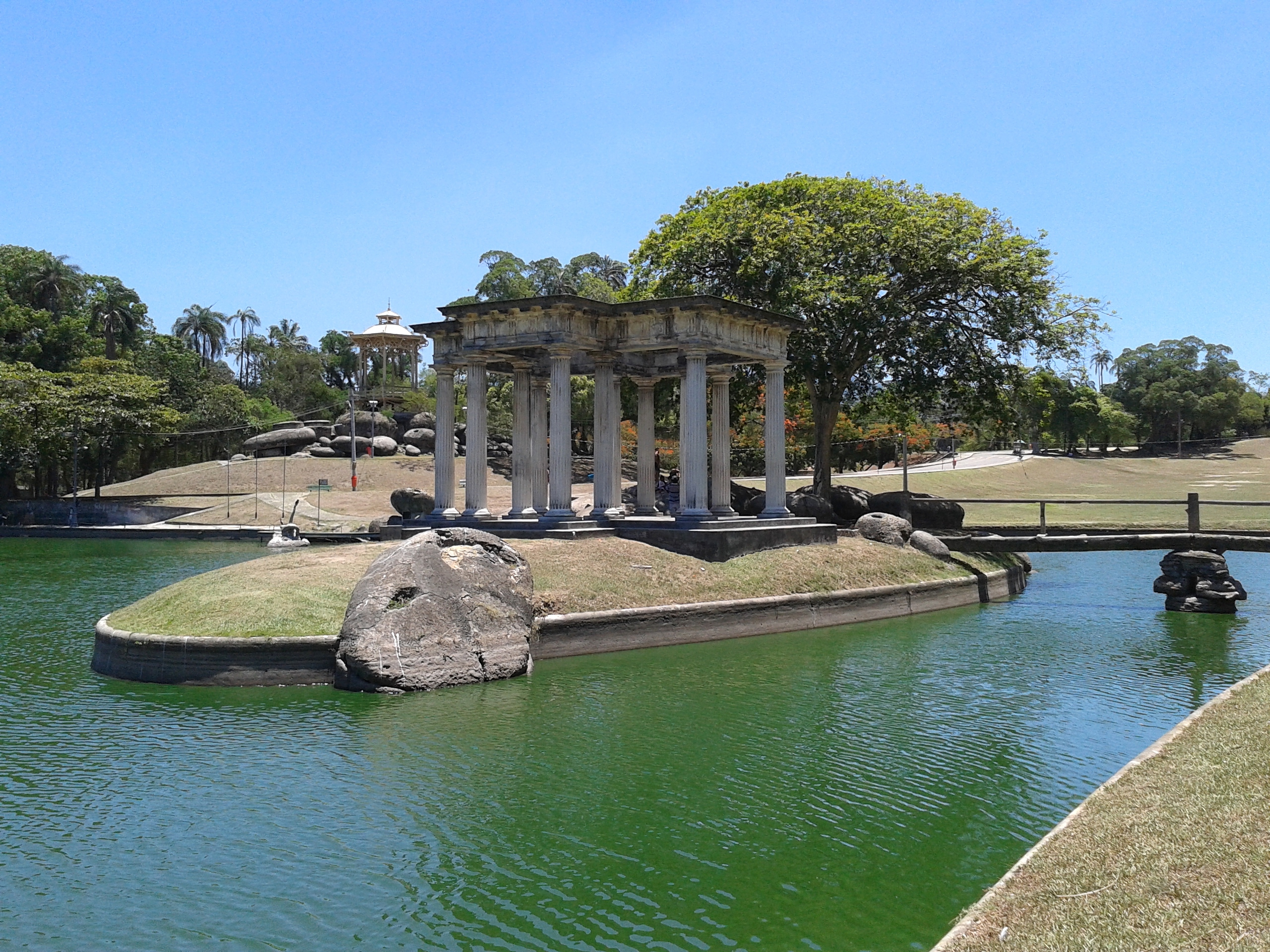
Temple and Pagoda

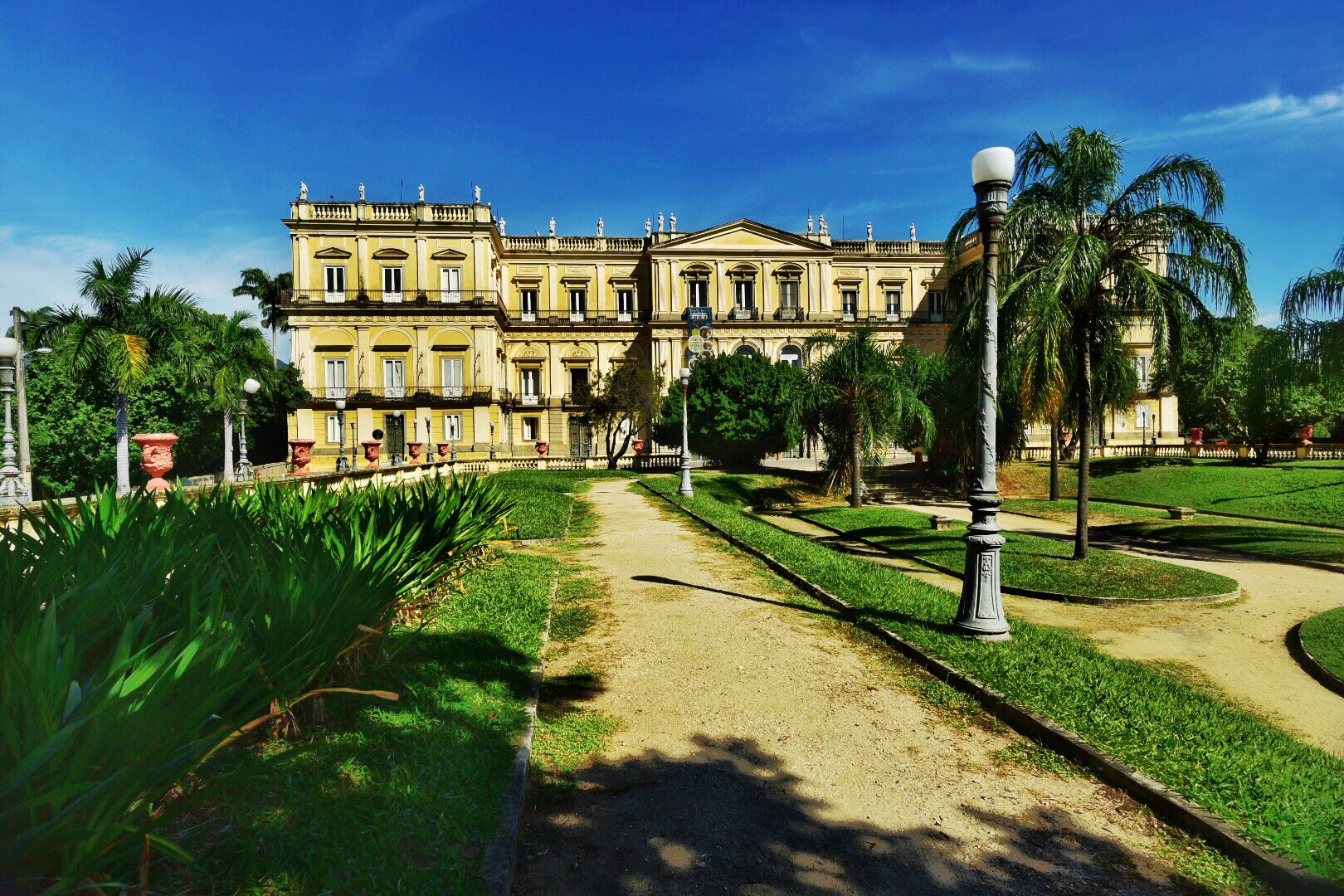
Neoclassical facade of the former Imperial Palace that was the National Museum of Brazil

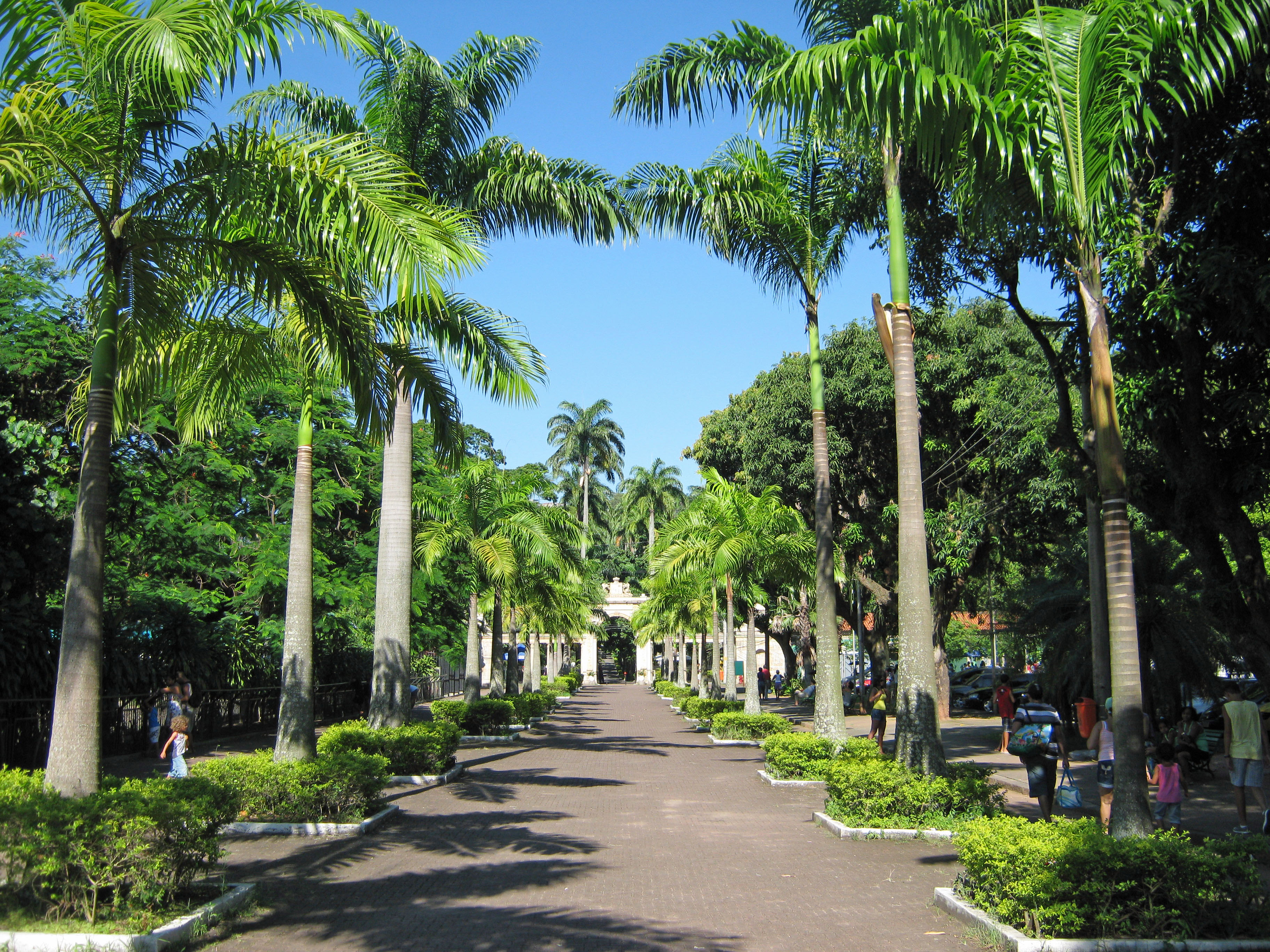
Zoological Garden entrance

=== Zoological Garden ===
The Zoo of Rio is perhaps the most popular attraction of the Quinta. It was inaugurated in 1945 under President Getúlio Vargas and is the oldest in Brazil. Among its over 2000 animals, the collections of Brazilian monkeys and birds are particularly important.
