= Água Santa, Rio de Janeiro =

Água Santa
- Neighborhood
- Location in Rio de Janeiro Água Santa (Brazil)
- Coordinates: 22°54′44″S 43°18′37″W
- Country: Brazil
- State: Rio de Janeiro (RJ)
- Municipality/City: Rio de Janeiro
- Zone: North Zone

Água Santa is a neighborhood in the North Zone of Rio de Janeiro, Brazil. The neighborhood is bordered by Jacarepaguá, Piedade, Encantado, Engenho de Dentro and the Dos Pretos-Forros Ridge. The Ary Franco Prison is located in the neighborhood.

== History ==
The neighborhood derives its name from the 1888 discovery of a mineral spring in the area by freed slave Domingos Camões. Camões began bottling the water in wine bottles and selling them door to door. Gradually, the area became known as Água Santa (Holy water).

In 1914, the bottling company Aguas Santa Cruz Ltd. was founded in the Água Santa district.

In 1974, the Ary Franco Prison was opened in the neighborhood. Pagode singer Belo was imprisoned in this jail after being convicted of drug trafficking.

== Demographics ==
The population of Água Santa was 7,243 in 2000. By 2010, the population had increased to 8,756 inhabitants, an increase of 20.88%.

According to the 2000 Human Development Index, the adult literacy rate is 97.48%.

According to the 2000 Human Development Index, life expectancy at birth is 76 years.

The neighborhood has undergone the process of favelization. According to the Brazilian Institute of Geography and Statistics, ten areas of the neighborhood are designated as favelas.

== Schools ==
The neighborhood is served by the municipal public school network. Brigadeiro Faria Lima Municipal School is located on Violeta Street next to the Ary Franco Prison. In the neighboring area of Piedade, there are also public schools: Virgilio de Melo Franco, Engenheiro Clovis Daudt and Republica de El Salvador on Almeida Nogueira Street.

== Events ==
The Feast of St. Anthony is held every June in Água Santa in honor of the patron saint. The feast is celebrated with traditional food tastings and a procession through the streets of the neighborhood.
