= Maria da Graça, Rio de Janeiro =

Maria da Graça
- Neighborhood
- Location in Rio de Janeiro Maria da Graça (Brazil)
- Coordinates: 22°52′59″S 43°15′50″W
- Country: Brazil
- State: Rio de Janeiro (RJ)
- Municipality/City: Rio de Janeiro
- Zone: North Zone

Maria da Graça is a neighborhood in the North Zone of Rio de Janeiro, Brazil.
