= Freguesia (Jacarepaguá) =

- Neighborhood
- Location in Rio de Janeiro Freguesia (Brazil)
- Coordinates: 22°55′52″S 43°20′40″W
- Country: Brazil
- State: Rio de Janeiro (RJ)
- Municipality/City: Rio de Janeiro
- Zone: Southwest Zone

Freguesia is a neighbourhood in the Southwest Zone of the city of Rio de Janeiro, Brazil. According to the Brazilian Institute of Geography and Statistics (IBGE), it had 653.492 inhabitants as of 2024, making it the most populous neighbourhood in the city.

Its occupational history has always included high-income families. Two years after Rio de Janeiro was founded, Salvador Correia de Sá, the city's first governor, granted the lands of Jacarepaguá to his sons for colonisation. The region acquired a noble status from the outset and retains higher concentration of wealthy residents.
