= Higienópolis, Rio de Janeiro =

Higienópolis
- Neighborhood
- Location in Rio de Janeiro Higienópolis (Brazil)
- Coordinates: 22°52′25″S 43°15′46″W
- Country: Brazil
- State: Rio de Janeiro (RJ)
- Municipality/City: Rio de Janeiro
- Zone: North Zone
- Administrative Region: Inhaúma

Population (2010)
  - Total: 15,734

Higienópolis is a neighborhood in the North Zone of Rio de Janeiro, Brazil.
