= Centro (Duque de Caxias) =

- Neighborhood
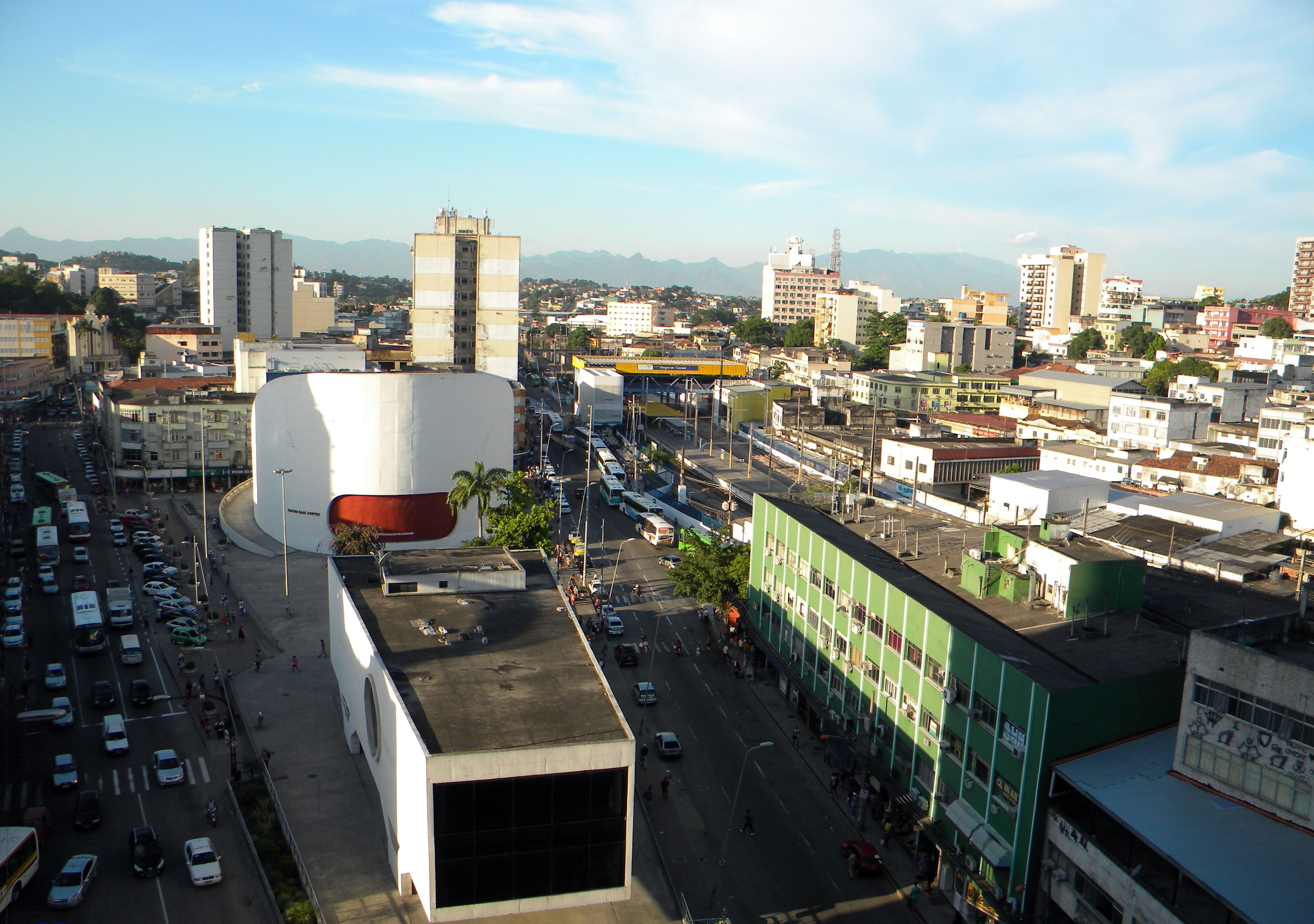
- Country: Brazil
- Region: Metropolitan Region of Rio de Janeiro
- City: Duque de Caxias
- District: District 1

The Centro is a neighborhood in the city of Duque de Caxias in Metropolitan Region of Rio de Janeiro, part of District 1 of the city. Some notable locations at Centro are the bus terminal, the train station in Duque de Caxias, the home school samba Acadêmicos do Grande Rio, the Cathedral of St. Anthony and the Market People Duque de Caxias.
