= Tijuca =

- Neighborhood
- Location in Rio de Janeiro Tijuca (Brazil)
- Coordinates: 22°55′52″S 43°14′34″W
- Country: Brazil
- State: Rio de Janeiro (RJ)
- Municipality/City: Rio de Janeiro
- Zone: North Zone

Population (2010)
  - Total: 163,805

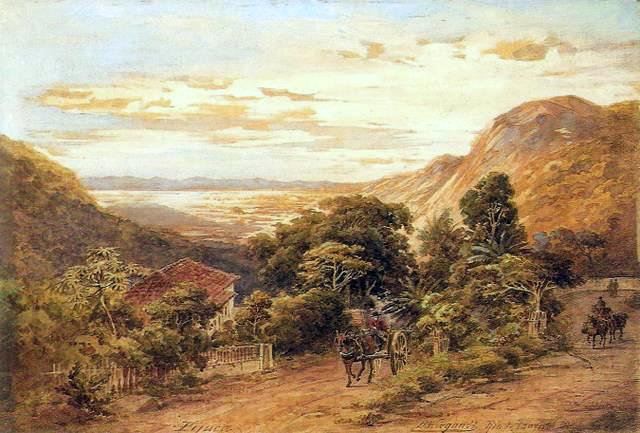
A 19th century picture of Tijuca

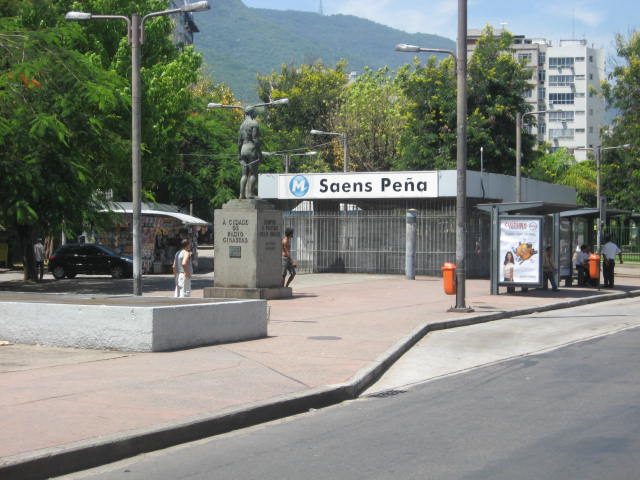
Metro station at Saens Peña Square

Tijuca (Portuguese pronunciation: [tʃiˈʒukɐ]) (meaning marsh or swamp in the Tupi language, from ty ("water") and îuk ("rotten")) is a neighbourhood of the Northern Zone of the city of Rio de Janeiro, Brazil. It comprises the region of Saens Peña and Afonso Pena squares. According to the 2000 Census, the district has close to 150,000 inhabitants. It borders with Praça da Bandeira, Maracanã, Vila Isabel, Andaraí, Grajaú and Alto da Boa Vista neighbourhoods.

It is one of the most traditional districts of Rio de Janeiro and has the third largest urban forest in the world, the Tijuca Forest, which is result of reforestation from coffee fields that led to lack of water at that time. Mainly a middle class district, it has been historically inhabited by Portuguese immigrant families and the families of military officers.

Tijuca hosts Salgueiro, Império da Tijuca and Unidos da Tijuca, three of the main Rio de Janeiro Samba Schools, that together have won 13 titles.

Several favelas are located in Tijuca, such as Salgueiro, Borel, Formiga, Turano and Casa Branca.

The American composer Louis Moreau Gottschalk (1829–1869) died in a hotel in Tijuca.
