= 1924 in Brazilian football =

Football in Brazil
- Season: 1924

The following article presents a summary of the 1924 football (soccer) season in Brazil, which was the 23rd season of competitive football in the country.

== Campeonato Paulista ==
Final Stage

Position	Team	Points	Played	Won	Drawn	Lost	For	Against	Difference
1	Corinthians	25	17	12	1	4	46	23	23
2	Paulistano	23	17	10	3	4	31	15	16
3	AA São Bento	22	17	9	4	4	30	20	10
4	Santos	21	17	9	3	5	44	29	15
5	Ypiranga-SP	20	17	9	2	6	29	24	5
6	Sírio	17	17	6	5	6	29	26	3
7	Brás	10	16	3	4	9	24	41	−17
8	Portuguesa	8	16	3	2	11	18	39	−21

Corinthians declared as the Campeonato Paulista champions.

== State championship champions ==
State	Champion	State	Champion
Amazonas	not disputed	Paraná	Palestra Itália-PR
Bahia	AA da Bahia	Pernambuco	Sport Recife
Ceará	Fortaleza	Rio de Janeiro (DF)	Vasco (by LMDT); Fluminense (by AMEA)
Espírito Santo	Rio Branco-ES	Rio Grande do Norte	ABC
Maranhão	Luso Brasileiro	Rio Grande do Sul	not disputed
Minas Gerais	América-MG	Santa Catarina	Avaí
Pará	Remo	São Paulo	Corinthians
Paraíba	Cabo Branco	Sergipe	Sergipe

== Other competition champions ==
Competition	Champion
Campeonato Brasileiro de Seleções Estaduais	Rio de Janeiro (DF)

== Brazil national team ==
The Brazil national football team did not play any matches in 1924.
