= Pechincha =

- Neighborhood
- Location in Rio de Janeiro Pechincha (Brazil)
- Coordinates: 22°55′52″S 43°21′11″W
- Country: Brazil
- State: Rio de Janeiro (RJ)
- Municipality/City: Rio de Janeiro
- Zone: Southwest Zone

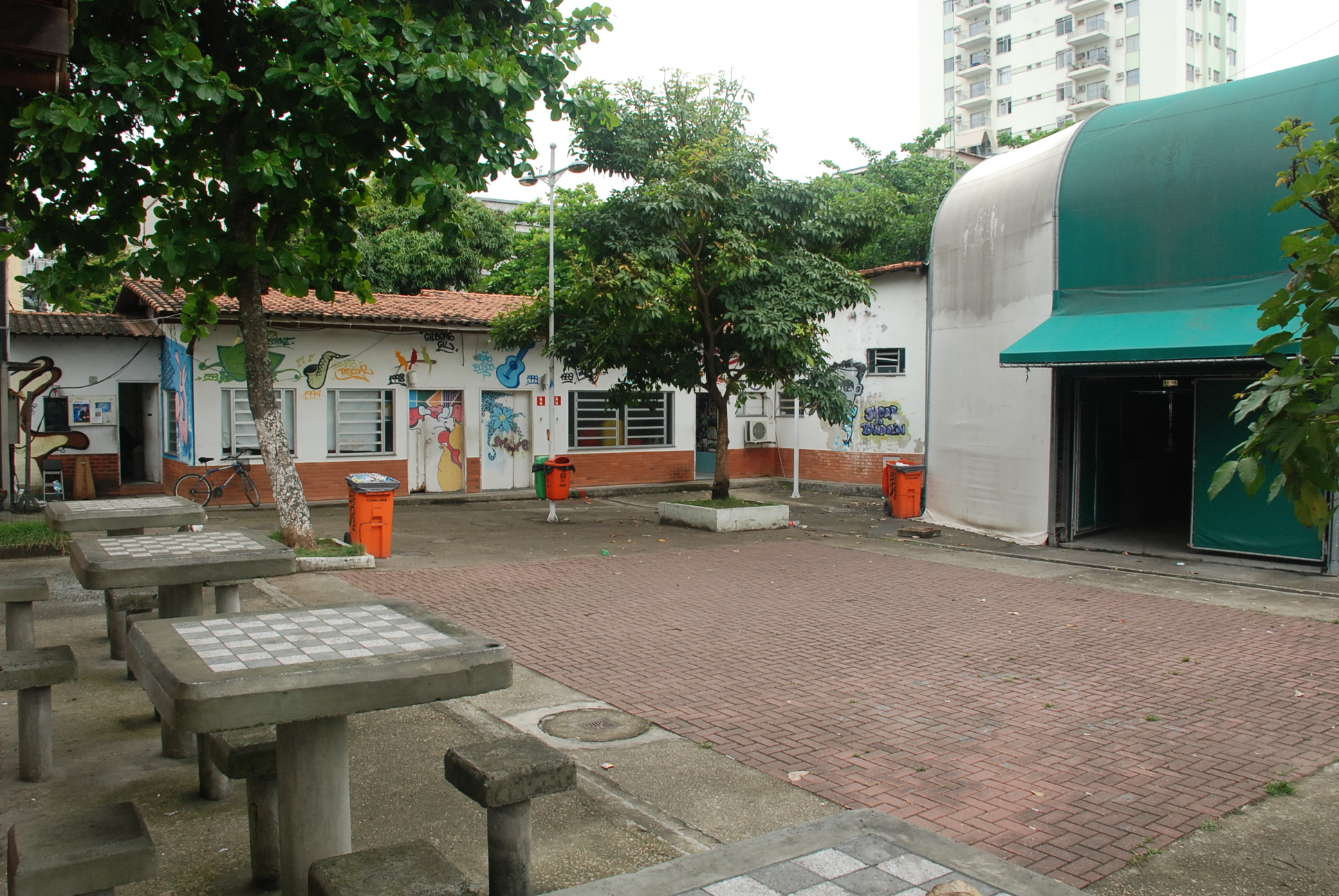
Lona Cultural Municipal Jacob do Bandolim in Pechincha, Rio de Janeiro

Pechincha is a predominantly residential neighborhood in the city of Rio de Janeiro, Brazil. It emerged in the early 20th century along the former Caminho da Freguesia, now Avenida Geremário Dantas. The name became popular because a market in the area sold its products at lower prices than businesses in nearby Freguesia and Taquara.
