= Del Castilho =

- Neighborhood
- Location in Rio de Janeiro Del Castilho (Brazil)
- Coordinates: 22°52′47″S 43°16′21″W
- Country: Brazil
- State: Rio de Janeiro (RJ)
- Municipality/City: Rio de Janeiro
- Zone: North Zone

Area
  - Total: 1.44 km^{2} (0.56 sq mi)
- Elevation: 21 m (69 ft)

Population (2010)
  - Total: 15,610
- Time zone: [[UTC-2]] (BRST)

Del Castilho is a neighborhood in the North Zone of Rio de Janeiro, Brazil. Many of the streets are named after impressionist artists, such as Van Gogh and Renoir.

== History ==
Toward the end of the 18th century, the land that is today Del Castilho was owned by Dom José Joaquim Castelo Branco, the first bishop of Rio de Janeiro. No one truly knows where the name originated, but the most common theory is that it came from a Spaniard named Henrique de Castile, and that the baptism was performed by Paulo de Frontin, a politician and engineer who would have honored a friend when the train station opened in 1898.
