= Norte Shopping =

Shopping centre in Rio de Janeiro, Brazil

Coordinates: 22°53′14″S 43°16′59″W

- Location: Avenida Dom Hélder Câmara, Cachambi, Rio de Janeiro, Brazil
- Opened: July 27, 1986; 40 years ago
- Developer: Ecisa
- Owner: BRMalls
- Architect: Luis Carlos de Azevedo
- Num. of stores: 343
- Num. of anchor tenants: 11
- Floor area: 245,028 m^{2} (2,637,460 sq ft)
- Floors: 3
- Website: www.norteshopping.com.br

Norte Shopping is the largest shopping center in the city of Rio de Janeiro and the second largest in Brazil. Established in 1986, the complex has undergone several major expansions. Notable for the programme of artworks in stained glass and mosaic designed for its 1996 expansion by architectural artist Brian Clarke, Norte Shopping has a constructed area of 245,028 m^{2} (2,637,460 sq ft).

The complex comprises 343 shops, with 11 anchor stores, a medical center, a theater (Teatro Miguel Falabella), a college (Estacio de Sa – North Campus Shop), a school (Centro Educacional da Lagoa), second language courses (French Alliance and SCAN), an indoor kart track, an ice skating rink, and various services.
