= Imperial de São Cristóvão =

São Cristóvão Imperial de São Cristóvão
- Neighborhood
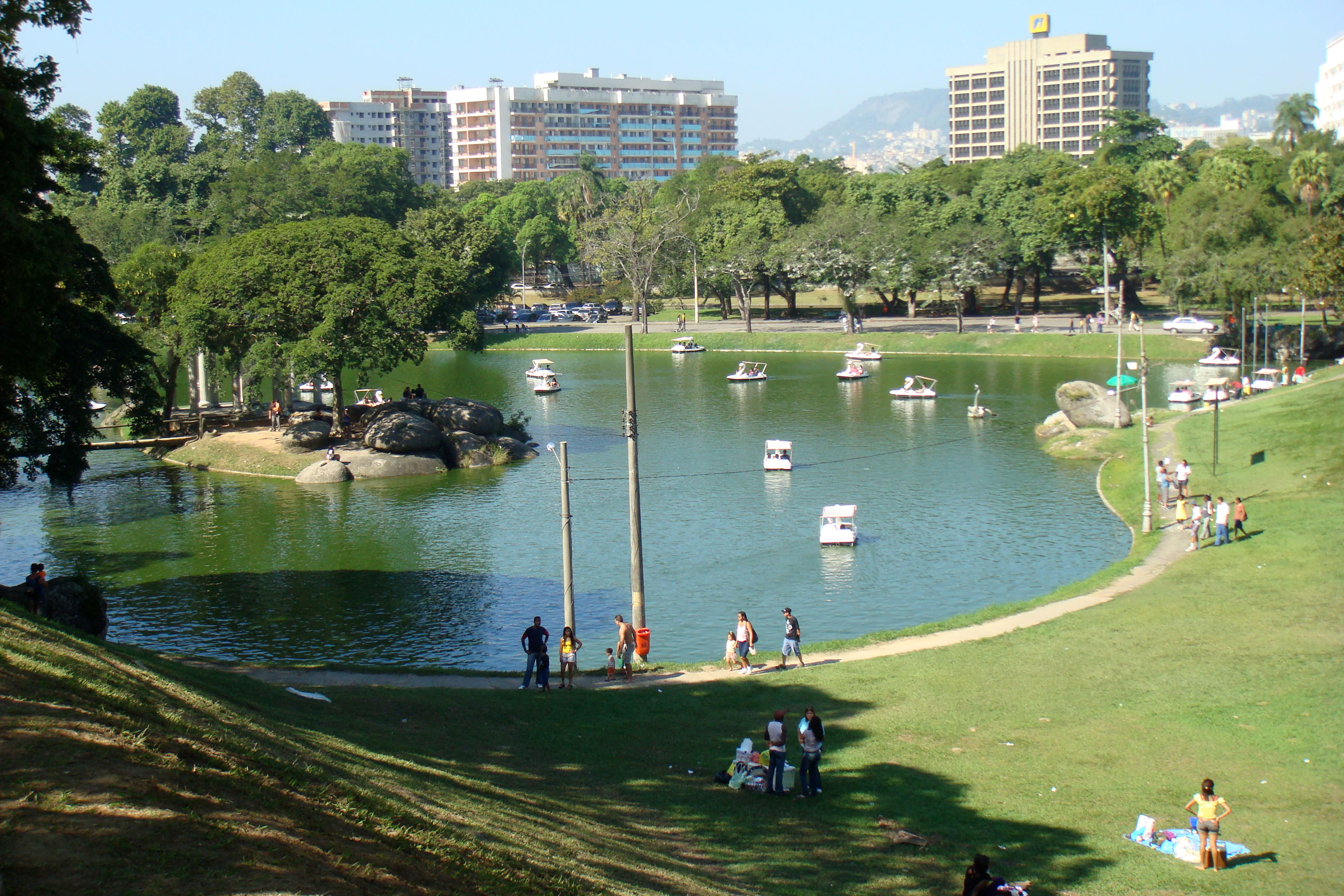

- Location in Rio de Janeiro São Cristóvão (Brazil)
- Coordinates: 22°54′00″S 43°13′20″W
- Country: Brazil
- State: Rio de Janeiro (RJ)
- Municipality/City: Rio de Janeiro
- Zone: Centro

São Cristóvão (officially named Imperial de São Cristóvão) is a traditional neighborhood in the north of Rio de Janeiro, Brazil.

== History ==
The first inhabitants were the Tamoio Indians. After Brazil was discovered and colonized by Portugal, the Jesuits inhabited the place. In 1759, the Marquis of Pombal expelled the Jesuits, and the farms of the region were divided up to form small farms and quintas (residences located in rural properties). One of these was the Quinta da Boa Vista.

In 1810, King John VI of Portugal adopted the Quinta da Boa Vista as his official residence, the Paço de São Cristóvão. Around it mansions and streets were built and electric light was installed. The local aristocracy moved to the neighborhood.

During the 19th century, several meters of land were reclaimed from the sea, and the swamps were drained. Pedro II of Brazil, who was the country's second emperor, was born and bred in the neighborhood and from there he ruled the country for almost half a century. During his reign the neighborhood was modernized and industries were installed. He was deposed by a military coup on November 15, 1889 and the Quinta da Boa Vista became a museum in 1893.

Since before the transposition of the Portuguese Court to the neighbourhood, the place attracted a growing Portuguese diaspora. Since then, the neighbourhood is home to a significant number of Portuguese heritage families. The neighbourhood is widely known for being the host of a significant Portuguese diasporic community, especially alongside the zones of Rua São Cristóvão, Euclides da Cunha, and Fonseca Telles. Today, several second and third generation children born in the Portuguese diaspora of São Cristóvão are known to have emigrated back to Europe, after acquiring Portuguese citizenship via their parents or grandparents.

In 1940, the Avenida Brasil, the most important road to transport the neighborhood's production, was inaugurated.

Especially during the 1950s and the 1960s, the industrialization of the area attracted migrants from several different regions of Brazil, particularly from the Northeast.

== Sports ==
São Cristóvão is the home of São Cristóvão de Futebol e Regatas, which is a traditional Rio de Janeiro football (soccer) club. The club's stadium, Estádio Figueira de Melo, commonly known by its nickname Figueirinha, is also located in the neighborhood.

== Cultural attractions ==
The neighbourhood has several historical buildings, of which some are historical museums like the Museu do Primeiro Reinado and the Museu Militar Conde de Linhares.

The former National Museum, its former library and the zoological garden of Rio de Janeiro are located in the Quinta da Boa Vista park.

There are four churches in the neighborhood, Church of São Cristóvão (Igreja de São Cristóvão), Church of Saint Edwigs (Igreja de Santa Edwiges), Church of Saint Roque (Igreja de São Roque), and the Church of Saint Januarius and Saint Augustine (Igreja de São Januário e São Augustinho).

The São Cristóvão's Fair (Feira de São Cristóvão) is another popular attraction. It is always carried out on Sundays, by the Northeast Region community.

== Notable residents ==
- Carlos Latuff (cartoonist)
