= Cidade Universitária =

Neighborhood in Rio de Janeiro, Brazil

- Neighborhood
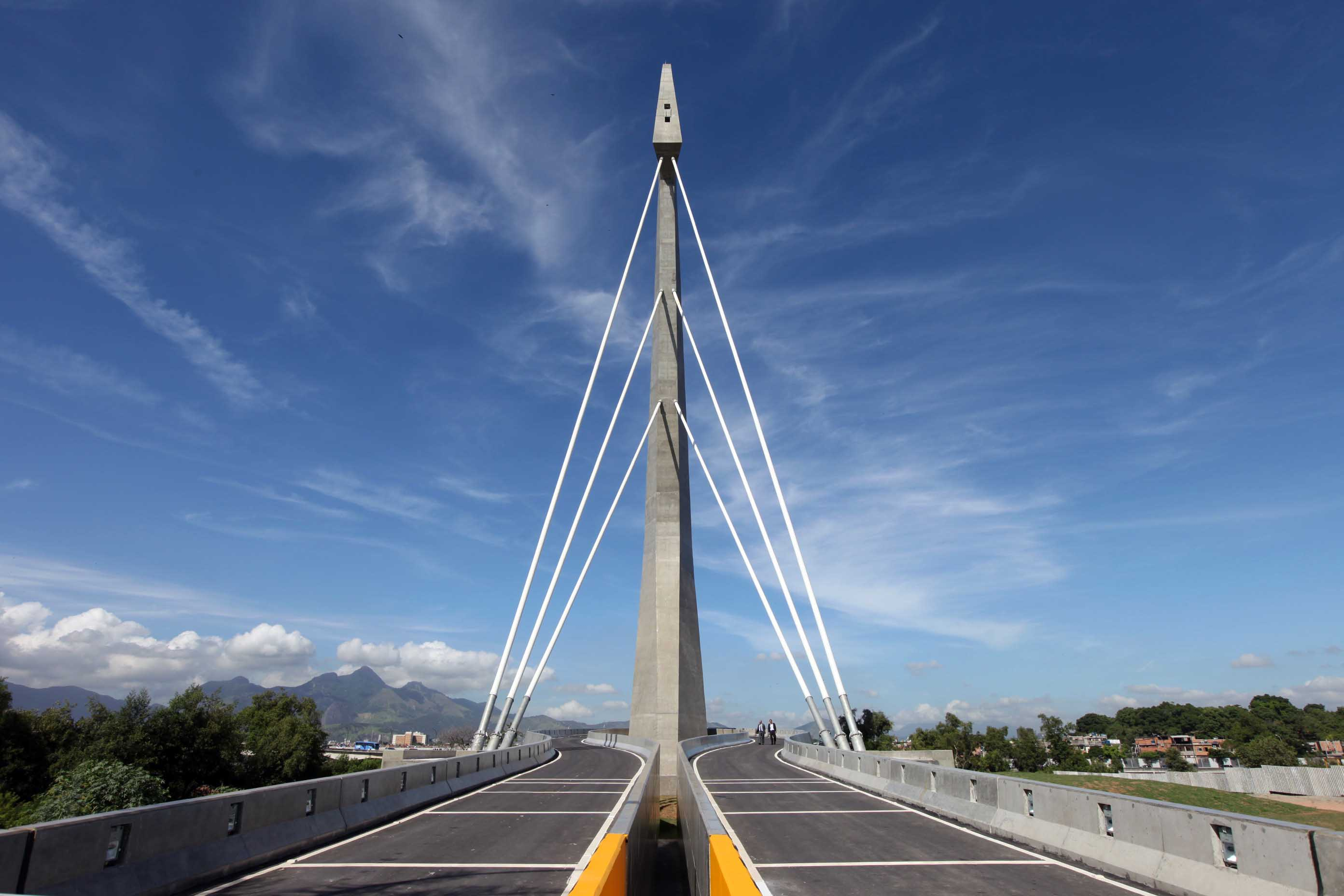

- Location in Rio de Janeiro Cidade Universitária (Brazil)
- Coordinates: 22°51′11″S 43°13′33″W
- Country: Brazil
- State: Rio de Janeiro (RJ)
- Municipality/City: Rio de Janeiro
- Zone: North Zone

Area
  - Total: 5.2383 km^{2} (2.0225 sq mi)
- Elevation: 43 m (141 ft)

Population (2010)
  - Total: 1,556

Cidade Universitária is a neighborhood in the North Zone of Rio de Janeiro, Brazil, on the artificial island of Fundão Island.
