= Bonsucesso =

Bonsucesso historically Bomsucesso
- Neighborhood
- Location in Rio de Janeiro Bonsucesso (Brazil)
- Coordinates: 22°51′47″S 43°15′11″W
- Country: Brazil
- State: Rio de Janeiro (RJ)
- Municipality/City: Rio de Janeiro
- Zone: North Zone

Population (2022)
  - Total: 16,872

Bonsucesso is a neighborhood in the North Zone of Rio de Janeiro, Brazil with a population of about 17,000.

Formerly the neighbourhood was known for industry, which has since moved largely to the outskirts of Rio and made place for a more service based economy.

It may be best known for the Bonsucesso Futebol Clube, which dates back to the year 1913.

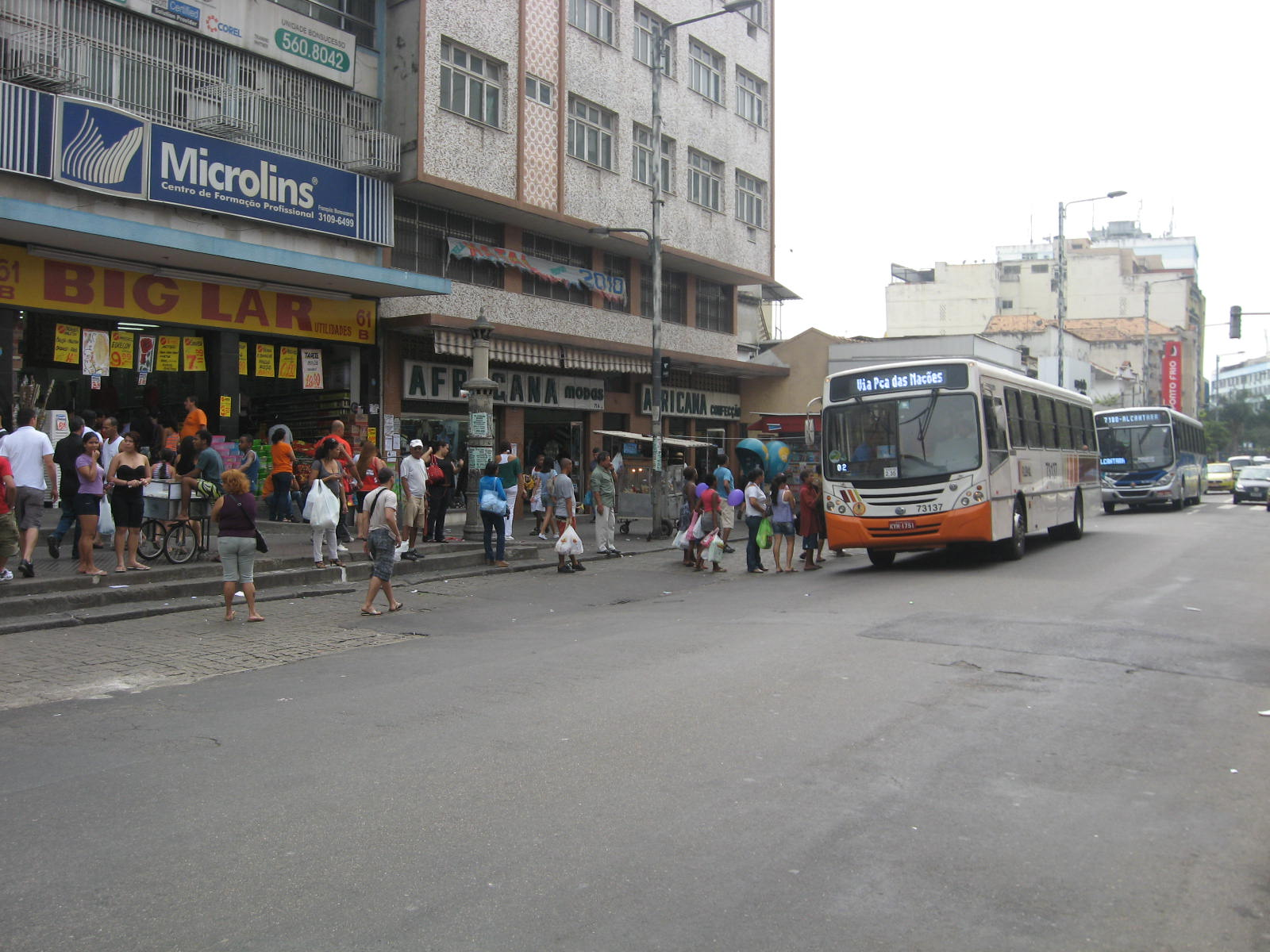
Street view (2010)

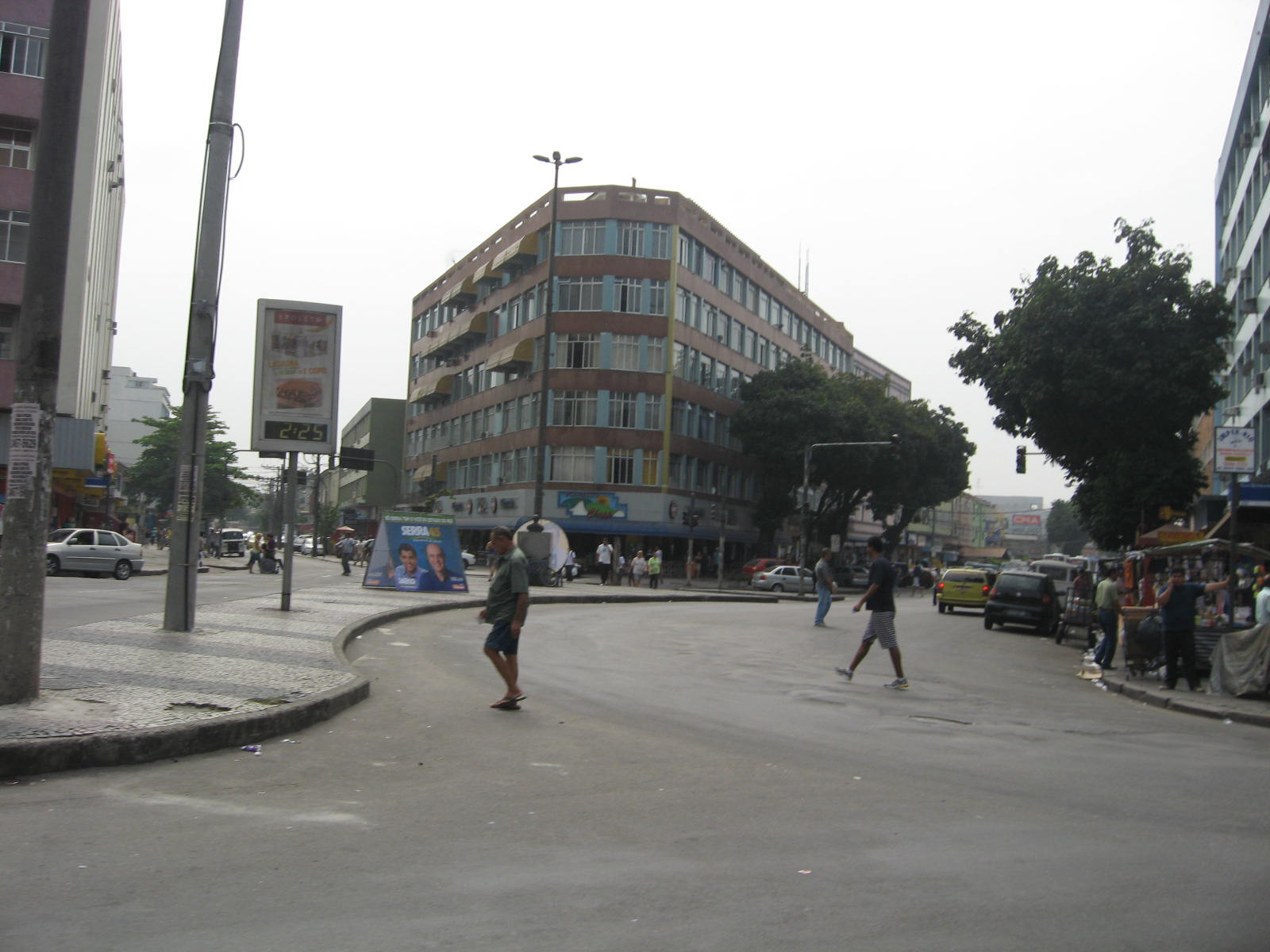
Street view (2010)

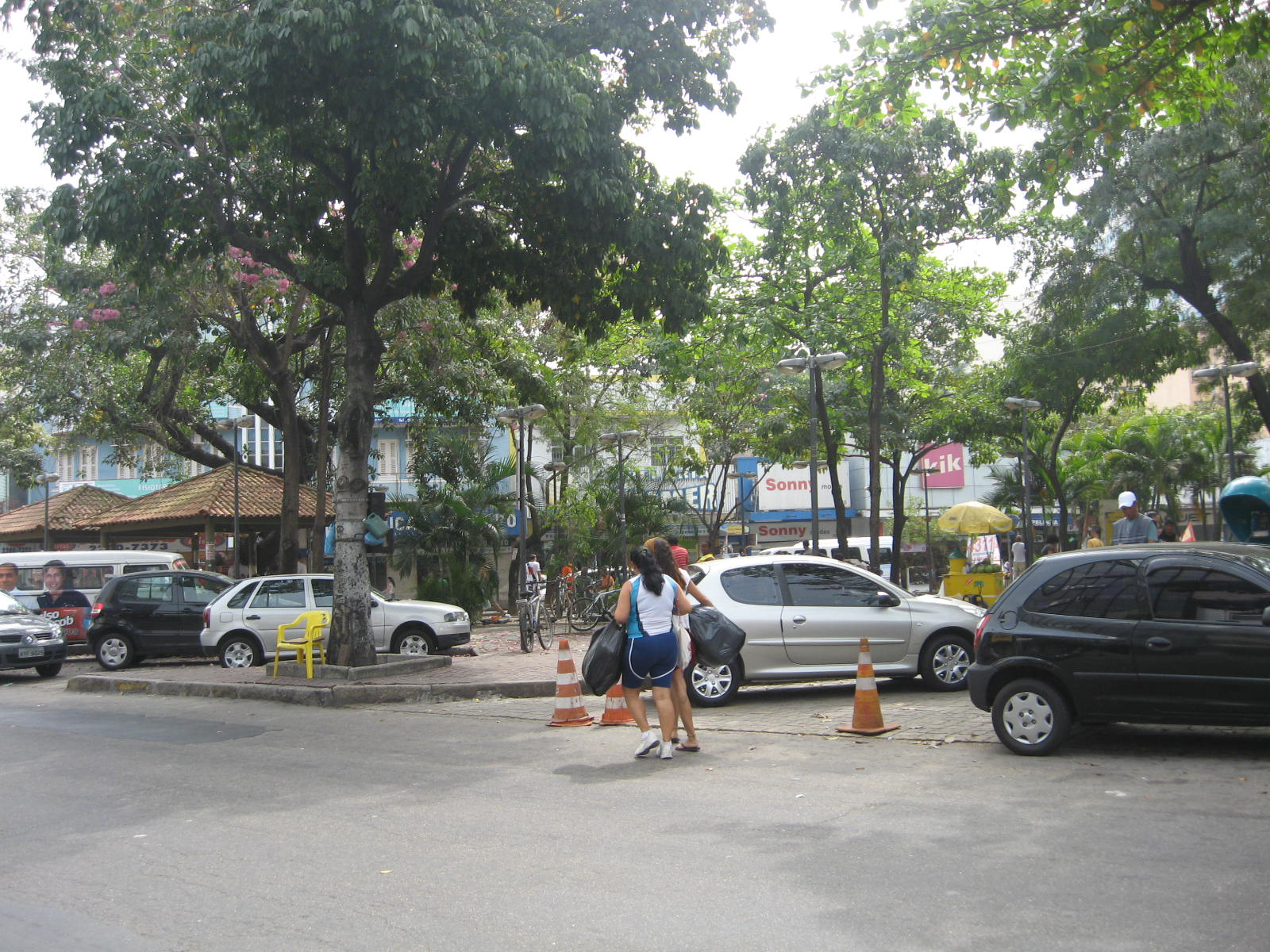
Praça das Nações (2010)

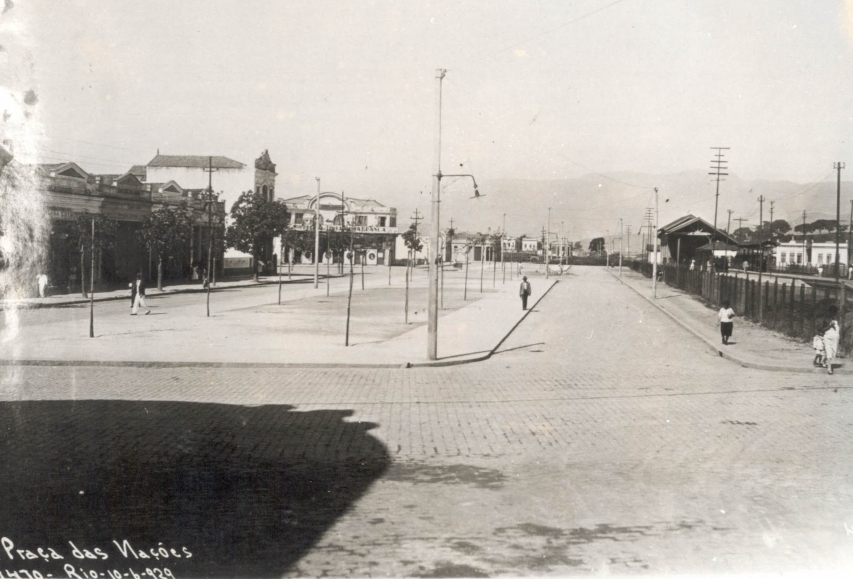
Praça das Nações (1929)

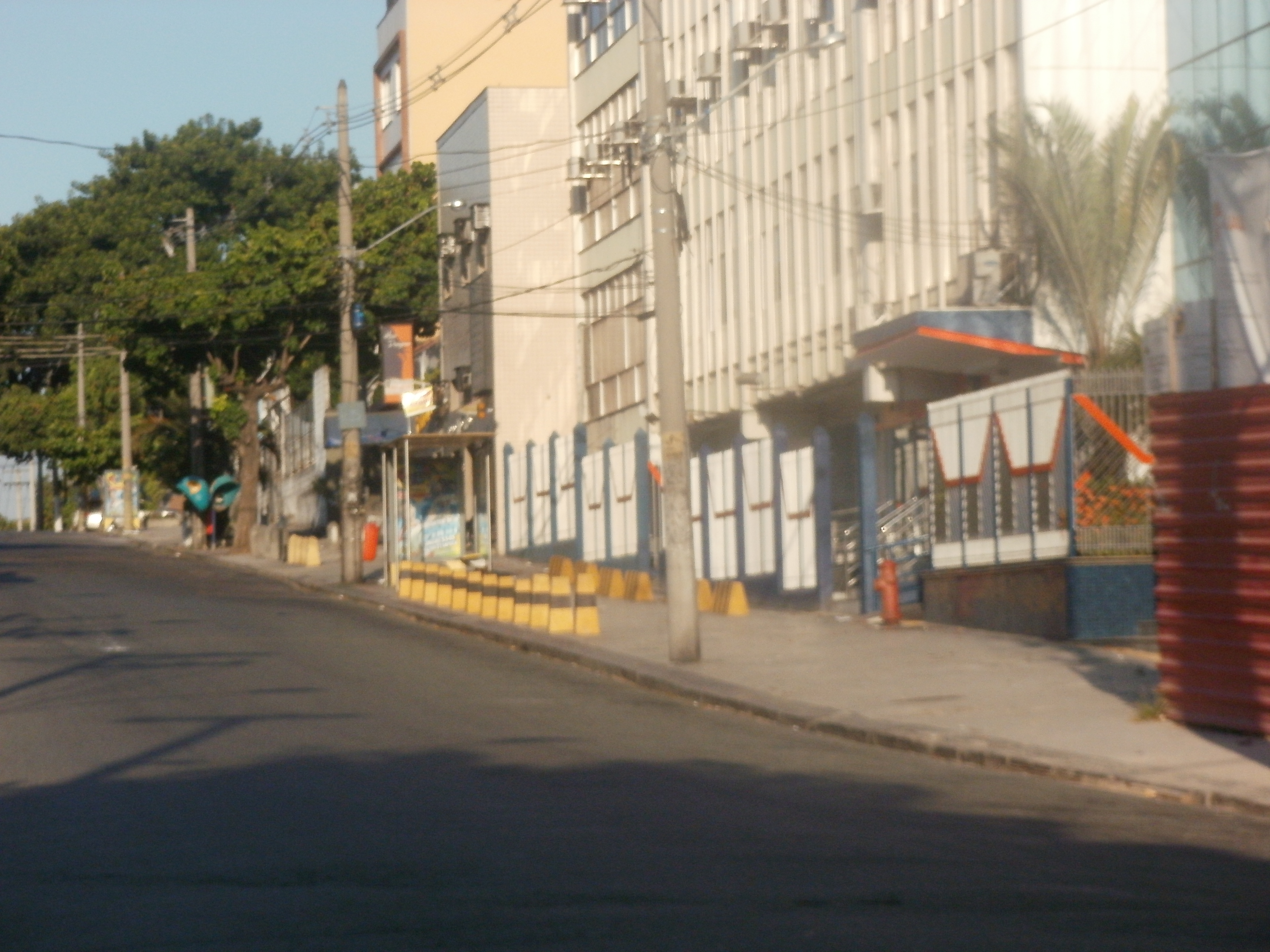
Avenida Paris (2011)

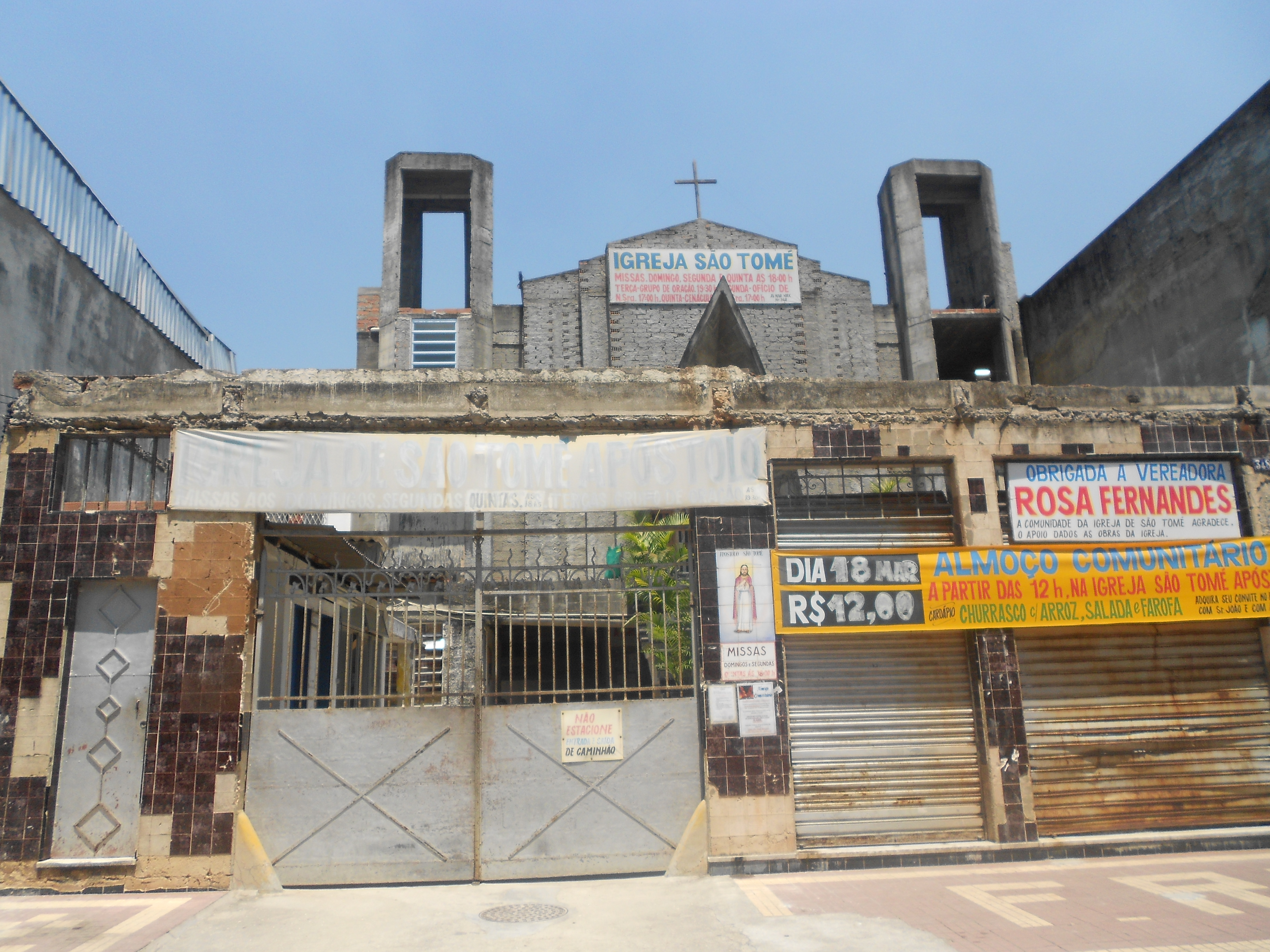
Church São Tomé (2012)

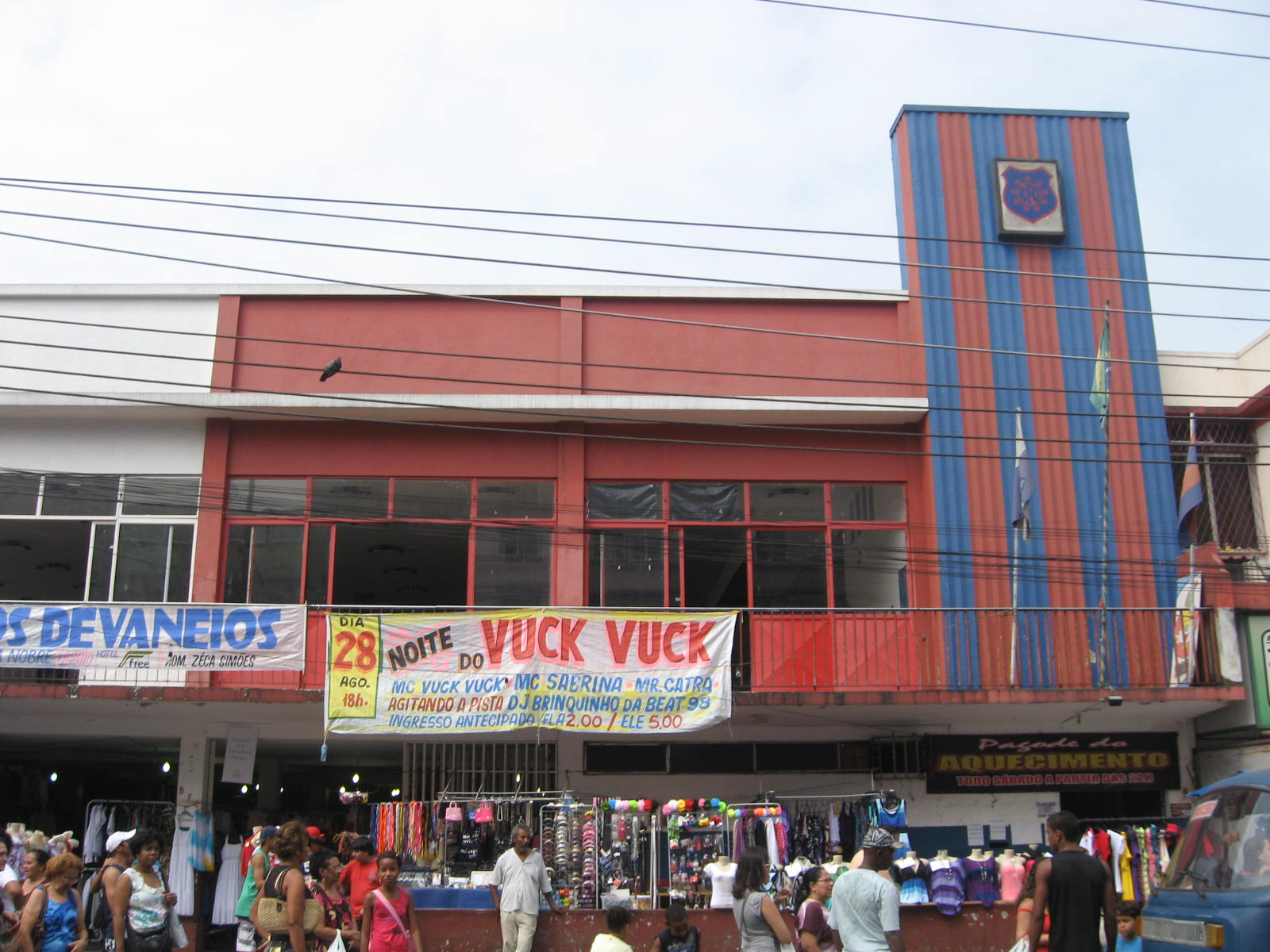
Bonsucesso Futebol Clube (2010)
