= Lins de Vasconcelos =

Neighborhood in the North Zone of Rio de Janeiro

- Neighborhood
- Location in Rio de Janeiro Lins de Vasconcelos (Brazil)
- Coordinates: 22°54′48″S 43°17′05″W
- Country: Brazil
- State: Rio de Janeiro (RJ)
- Municipality/City: Rio de Janeiro
- Zone: North Zone

Lins de Vasconcelos is a neighborhood in the North Zone of Rio de Janeiro, Brazil.
