= Todos os Santos, Rio de Janeiro =

Todos os Santos
- Neighborhood
- Location in Rio de Janeiro Todos os Santos (Brazil)
- Coordinates: 22°53′43″S 43°17′06″W
- Country: Brazil
- State: Rio de Janeiro (RJ)
- Municipality/City: Rio de Janeiro
- Zone: North Zone

Todos os Santos is a neighborhood in the North Zone of Rio de Janeiro, Brazil.
