= Grajaú, Rio de Janeiro =

Grajaú
- Neighborhood
- Location in Rio de Janeiro Grajaú (Brazil)
- Coordinates: 22°55′42″S 43°15′37″W
- Country: Brazil
- State: Rio de Janeiro (RJ)
- Municipality/City: Rio de Janeiro
- Zone: North Zone

Grajaú is a neighborhood in the North Zone of Rio de Janeiro, Brazil.
