= Abolição =

- Neighborhood
- Abolição within the city of Rio de Janeiro; and the state of Rio de Janeiro (inset)
- Interactive map of Abolição
- Coordinates: 22°53′16″S 43°17′57″W
- Country: Brazil
- State: Rio de Janeiro (RJ)
- Municipality/City: Rio de Janeiro
- Zone: North Zone
- Administrative Region: Méier

Area
  - Total: 61.63 ha (152.3 acres)

Population (2010)
  - Total: 11,356
  - Density: 18,430/km^{2} (47,720/sq mi)

Abolição (Abolition) is a middle-class neighborhood of the North Zone of the city of Rio de Janeiro, Brazil.
