= Cachambi =

Neighborhood in Rio de Janeiro, Brazil

- Neighborhood
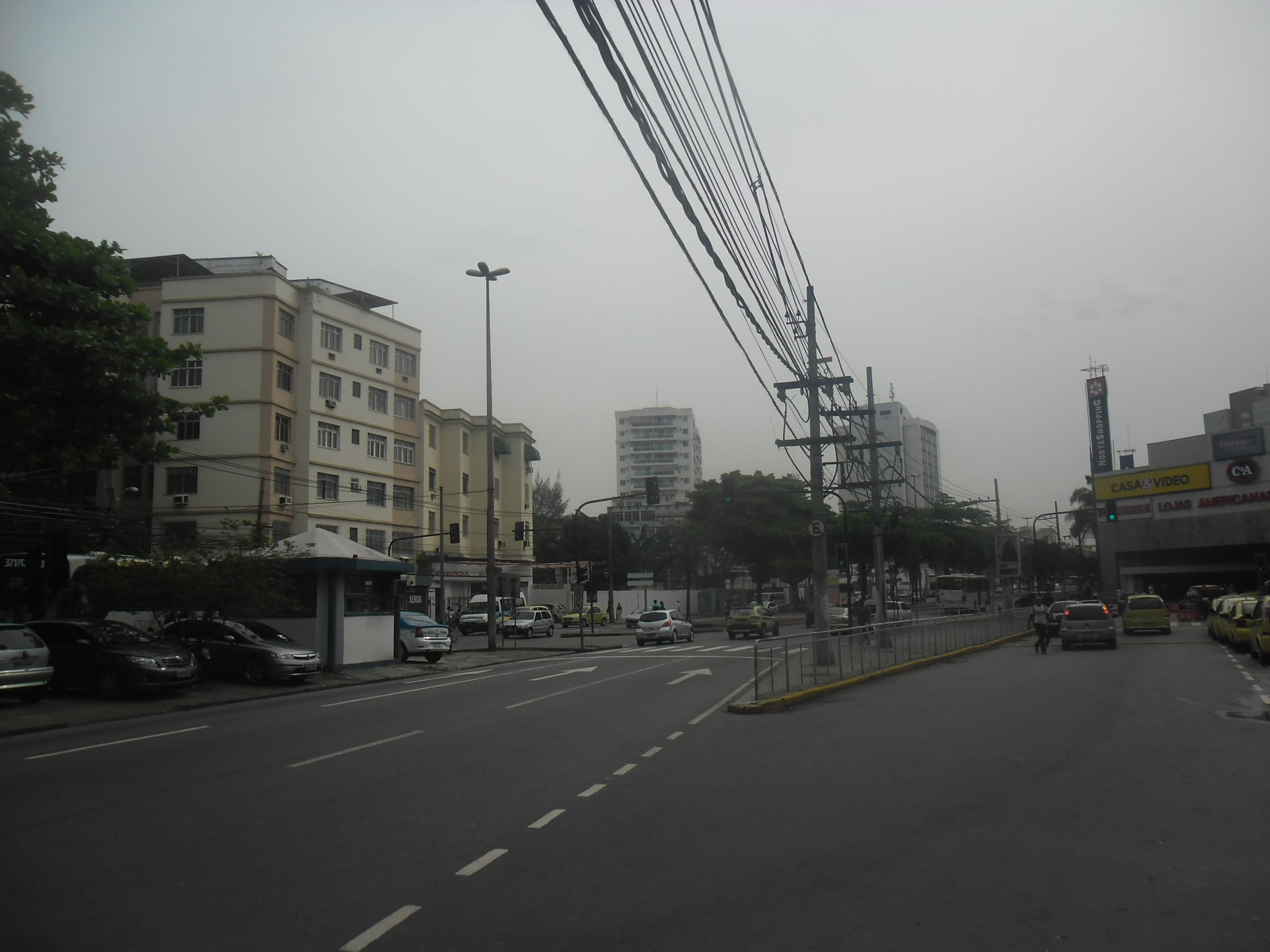

- Location in Rio de Janeiro Cachambi (Brazil)
- Coordinates: 22°53′26″S 43°16′29″W
- Country: Brazil
- State: Rio de Janeiro (RJ)
- Municipality/City: Rio de Janeiro
- Zone: North Zone

Population (2010)
  - Total: 42,415

Cachambi is a middle-class and lower-middle-class neighborhood of the North Zone of Rio de Janeiro, Brazil. It has an HDI of 0.900.
