= Méier =

- Neighborhood
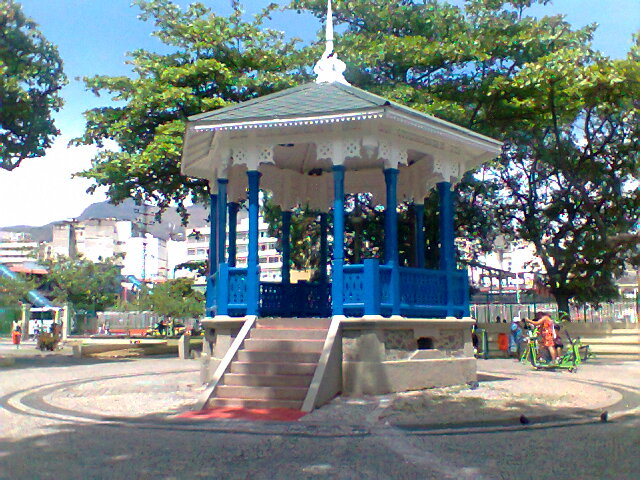

- Location in Rio de Janeiro Méier (Brazil)
- Coordinates: 22°54′05″S 43°16′56″W
- Country: Brazil
- State: Rio de Janeiro (RJ)
- Municipality/City: Rio de Janeiro
- Zone: North Zone

Population (2010)
  - Total: 49.828

Méier is a middle class neighborhood in the North Zone of Rio de Janeiro, Brazil. The neighborhood is the historic center of the "Área dos Engenhos", or "Mill Area", which today is known as Grande Méier (Great Méier) and has been a sub-prefecture since 2013. As a result, it has a wide range of shops and a variety of services and transport, although it is not one of the largest neighborhoods of the municipality. In the neighborhood is located one of the first shopping centers in Brazil, Shopping do Méier, opened in 1963. It has two distinct urban appearances, one more bustling, commercial, in the areas close to the train station, and a quieter one, on more residential streets.

== Education and leisure ==
The neighborhood has some private universities, several private schools (some almost centenary), state and municipal schools. The best known schools are private, Immaculate Heart of Mary School (sagrado Coração de Maria) based in 1914 in the former Imperial Street, current Aristides Caire Street Immaculate Heart of Mary College, Qi College (Colégio QI) former Metropolitan College (Colégio Metropolitano) founded in 1932 in street Dias da Cruz (where today is the Méier Shopping Mall) and other several schools including Pensi College (former Martins College), Intellecus College, etc. There are several language private courses like CCAA, Brasas, Cultura Inglesa and Ibeu) and other courses (such as Kumon). There are also academies of traditional dance (Rio Dance Center) and Sport Club Mackenzie.

Dias da Cruz Street is closed and turned into a recreation area on Sundays and holidays from 8 a.m. to 6 p.m. between Hermengarda Street and Magalhães Couto Street.

== Health ==
Salgado Filho Municipal Hospital is located in Méier. The hospital began its activities on October 12, 1920 under the name Auxiliary Service of the First Aid Méier. On November 28, 1951, changed its name to Méier dispensary. Only on March 27, 1963 it finally opened as Salgado Filho State Hospital. On March 17, 1977, the new Municipal Hospital Salgado Filho, with a main block (and 7 underground floors), with two annexes (with a 3 and another with 2 floors) is inaugurated by Mayor Marcos Tamoya and his Secretary of Health, Dr. Felippe Cardoso Filho. Ana Barbosa on the street is located the post of Municipal CALL Caesar Pernetta.

The Todos os Santos neighborhood near Méier has the Pasteur Hospital, which opened in 2005. The hospital, with 24-hour care, has emergency, gynecology/obstetrics, general surgery, orthopedic and radiology departments.

== Culture ==
The neighborhood was once a cultural center but past the year this scenario has changed. It used to have four movie theaters. The most famous of them was the Imperator. The others were: Art Méier and Bruni Méier (both on the Silva Rabelo street) and Paratodos (on the Arquias Cordeiro Street). In 1991, Imperator was transformed into a dance club, but it was closed in 1995.

The neighborhood has the Rio Dance Center, founded in 1973, which had among its students actress Adriana Esteves and presenter Fátima Bernardes.

== Transport ==
=== Supervia ===
The neighborhood has a SuperVia station: the Méier station. Only the trains of Deodoro Line stop at this station, but it is possible to reach other available lines (Japeri and Santa Cruz) at Engenho de Dentro station.

=== Bus lines ===
The neighborhood has two buses terminals: the Americo Ayres Bus Terminal (end point / line regulator of 8 and 16 routes) and Architect Gelton Pacciello da Motta Bus Terminal (end point / regulator, 7 lines and 15 itineraries). There are 93 routes and 55 lines operated by 23 companies that allow access to several other neighborhoods in the city.

=== Taxi ===
The neighborhood has 9 taxi stops controlled by the Municipality of Rio de Janeiro. Other stops (like Engenho de Dentro and Norte Shopping) at nearby areas facilitate the use of this mean of transportation. Méier has some taxi cooperatives, and Taxi Méier is one of the most famous and used by the population.

Location	Number of points	Number of vacancies
Caetano de Almeida street	1	5
Dias da Cruz street	6	35
Maria Calmon street	1	5
Silva Rabelo street	1	3
Total	9	48
