= Avenida Brasil (Rio de Janeiro) =

Road in Brazil

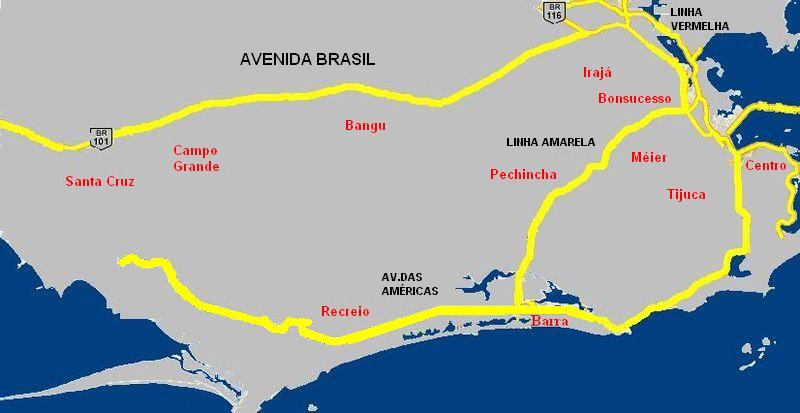
Map of Av. Brasil

Avenida Brasil is an expressway-like thoroughfare in Rio de Janeiro. Its emergence is associated with the expansion of the city to residential areas further away from its central region during the first half of the 20th century. It started to serve as a gateway by road, hitherto hitched by sea or by the path taken by trains. The avenue that was linked to Petrópolis in 1941 became the first federal highway (BR-01) in 1948.

At 58.5 kilometres (36.4 mi), it is the biggest avenue in extension in Brazil, as well as the largest urban track of BR-101. Av. Brasil was first proposed in 1939 and was inaugurated 7 years later, and currently goes through 26 neighbourhoods of Rio de Janeiro. Only one stretch, of 2.3 kilometers, is exclusively named "Avenida Brasil", which is between Avenida João XXIII, in Santa Cruz, and the access to the BR-101 highway, in the same neighborhood.

It is the longest avenue in extension in Brazil and the longest urban stretch of the BR-101, connecting the BR-101 north (Ponte Rio-Niterói and Rodovia Rio-Vitória/Niterói-Manilha) to the BR-101 south (Rodovia Rio-Santos). Its speed limit is up to 90 kilometers per hour; however, the average speed on the expressway significantly decreases because of traffic jams

In addition to BR-101, Avenida Brasil is also part of the BR-040, BR-116 and BR-465 routes, totaling all federal highways that pass through the city of Rio de Janeiro.

The City Hall of Rio de Janeiro measures Avenida Brasil as being responsible for the largest traffic flow in the city, with more than 800 thousand vehicles per day, attributed to the geographic influence of the road - caused by the phenomenon of pendular migration, that is, the daily movement of vehicles. workers from Baixada Fluminense and from North Zone and West Zone to the Center of the city.
