= Piedade, Rio de Janeiro =

Piedade
- Neighborhood
- Location in Rio de Janeiro Piedade (Brazil)
- Coordinates: 22°53′35″S 43°18′45″W
- Country: Brazil
- State: Rio de Janeiro (RJ)
- Municipality/City: Rio de Janeiro
- Zone: North Zone

Piedade is a neighborhood in the North Zone of Rio de Janeiro, Brazil.
