= Pilares =

- Neighborhood
- Location in Rio de Janeiro Pilares (Brazil)
- Coordinates: 22°52′50″S 43°17′43″W
- Country: Brazil
- State: Rio de Janeiro (RJ)
- Municipality/City: Rio de Janeiro
- Zone: North Zone

Pilares is a neighborhood in the North Zone of Rio de Janeiro, Brazil.
