= Encantado, Rio de Janeiro =

Encantado
- Neighborhood
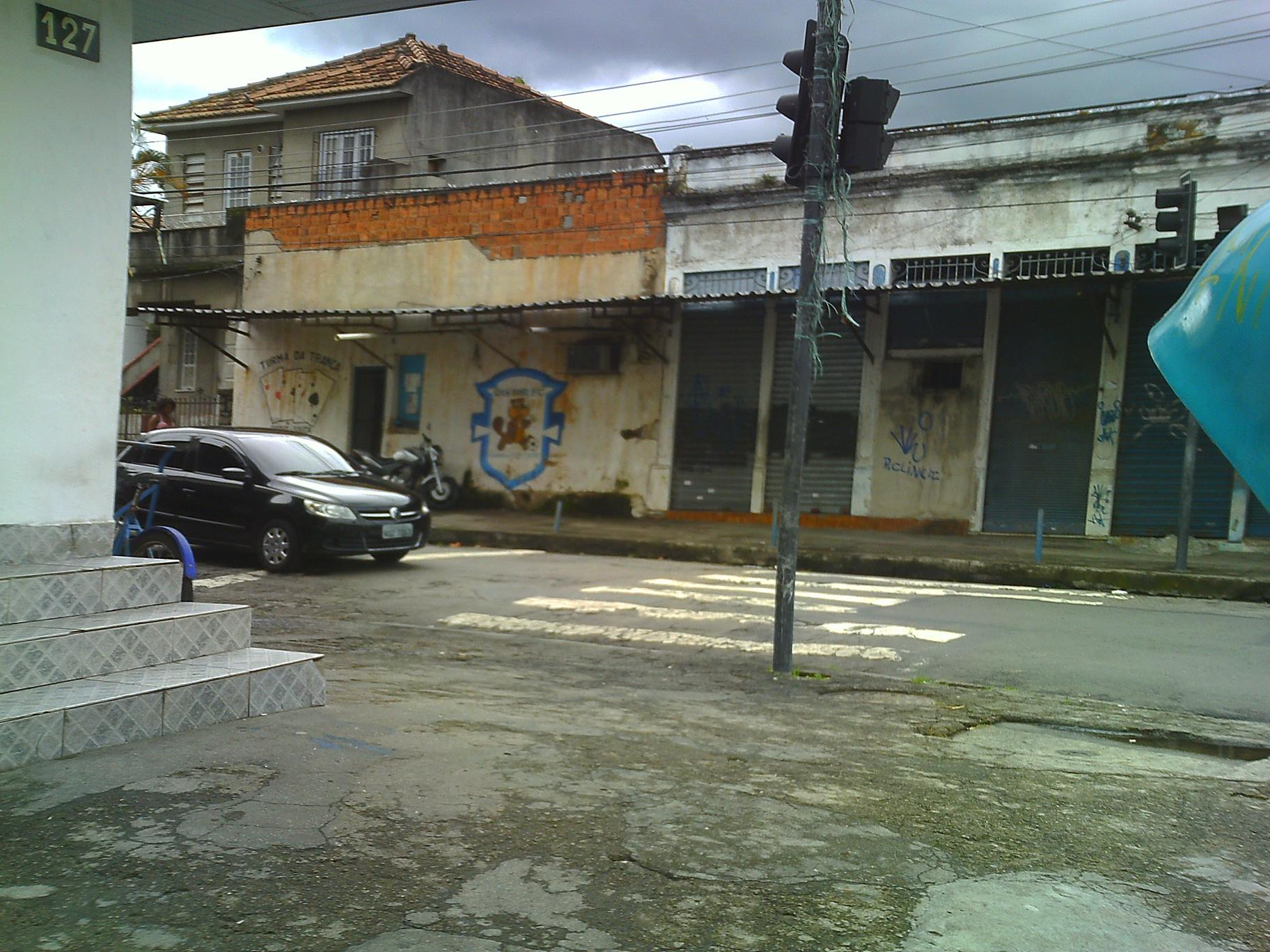
- Rua Cruz e Souza

- Location in Rio de Janeiro Encantado (Brazil)
- Coordinates: 22°53′45″S 43°18′08″W
- Country: Brazil
- State: Rio de Janeiro (RJ)
- Municipality/City: Rio de Janeiro
- Zone: North Zone

Population (2010)
  - Total: 15,021

Encantado is a neighborhood in the North Zone of Rio de Janeiro, Brazil.
