= Barra da Tijuca =

Barra da Tijuca Barra
- District
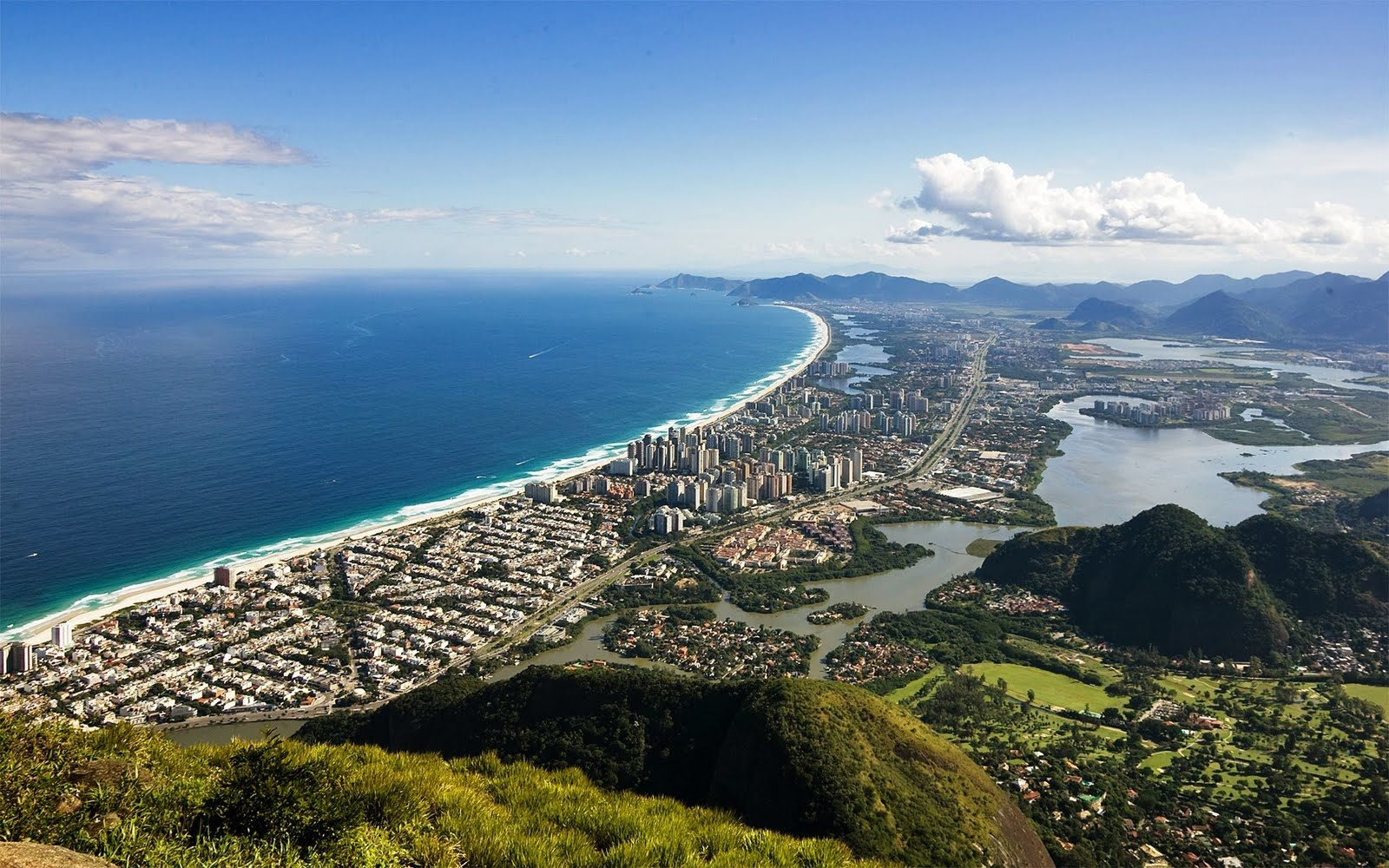
- Panoramic view of Barra da Tijuca

- Location in Rio de Janeiro Barra da Tijuca (Brazil)
- Coordinates: 22°59′58″S 43°21′57″W
- Country: Brazil
- State: Rio de Janeiro (RJ)
- Municipality/City: Rio de Janeiro
- Zone: Southwest Zone

Area
  - Total: 166 km^{2} (64 sq mi)

Population (2022)
  - Total: 421,438
  - Density: 2,540/km^{2} (6,580/sq mi)

Barra da Tijuca (Brazilian Portuguese pronunciation: [ˈbaʁɐ dɐ tʃiˈʒukɐ]), usually known as just Barra, is an upper-middle class neighborhood (or bairro) in the Southwest Zone of Rio de Janeiro, Brazil, located in the western portion of the city on the Atlantic Ocean. Barra is well known for its beaches, its many lakes and rivers, and its lifestyle. This neighbourhood represents 4.7% of the city population and 13% of the total area of Rio de Janeiro.

Barra da Tijuca is classified as one of the most developed places in Brazil, with one of the highest Human Development Indexes (HDI) in the country, as measured in the 2000 Brazil Census. Unlike the South and Central Zones, Barra da Tijuca follows Modernist standards, with large boulevards creating the major transit axis. The area's masterplan was designed by Lúcio Costa, known for his work on Brasília, and creates a region filled with many gardens, shopping malls, apartment buildings, and large mansions. In recent years, due to the rapid development of the Brazilian economy, Barra's population has increased by over 100,000, as a large number of residents and companies search for cheaper real estate as an alternative to the densely populated South Zone of Rio. Demographic data indicates that the region is the fastest-growing neighborhood in Rio: 98,851 in 1991, 174,353 in 2000, and 300,823 in 2010.

Barra natives and residents are known as Barristas, or more popularly, Barrenses. The neighborhood is a cultural, economic, and administrative hub of the city, and is believed to be the safest of Rio's upper-class neighbourhoods because of its lack of favelas and plentiful private and public security. It is the home of several celebrities and football players, such as the singer Anitta. Home to the Barra Olympic Park, Barra hosted a large number of venues for the 2016 Summer Olympics, the first held in South America.

== Etymology ==
The name Barra da Tijuca can be roughly translated as "clay sandbank". Barra means port entrance or sandbank, and Tijuca is a word originally from the Tupi ty-yúc and means putrid water, mud, swamp, puddle, clay or clay-pit. Tijuca (meaning marsh or swamp) from ty ("water") and îuká ("to kill").

== History ==
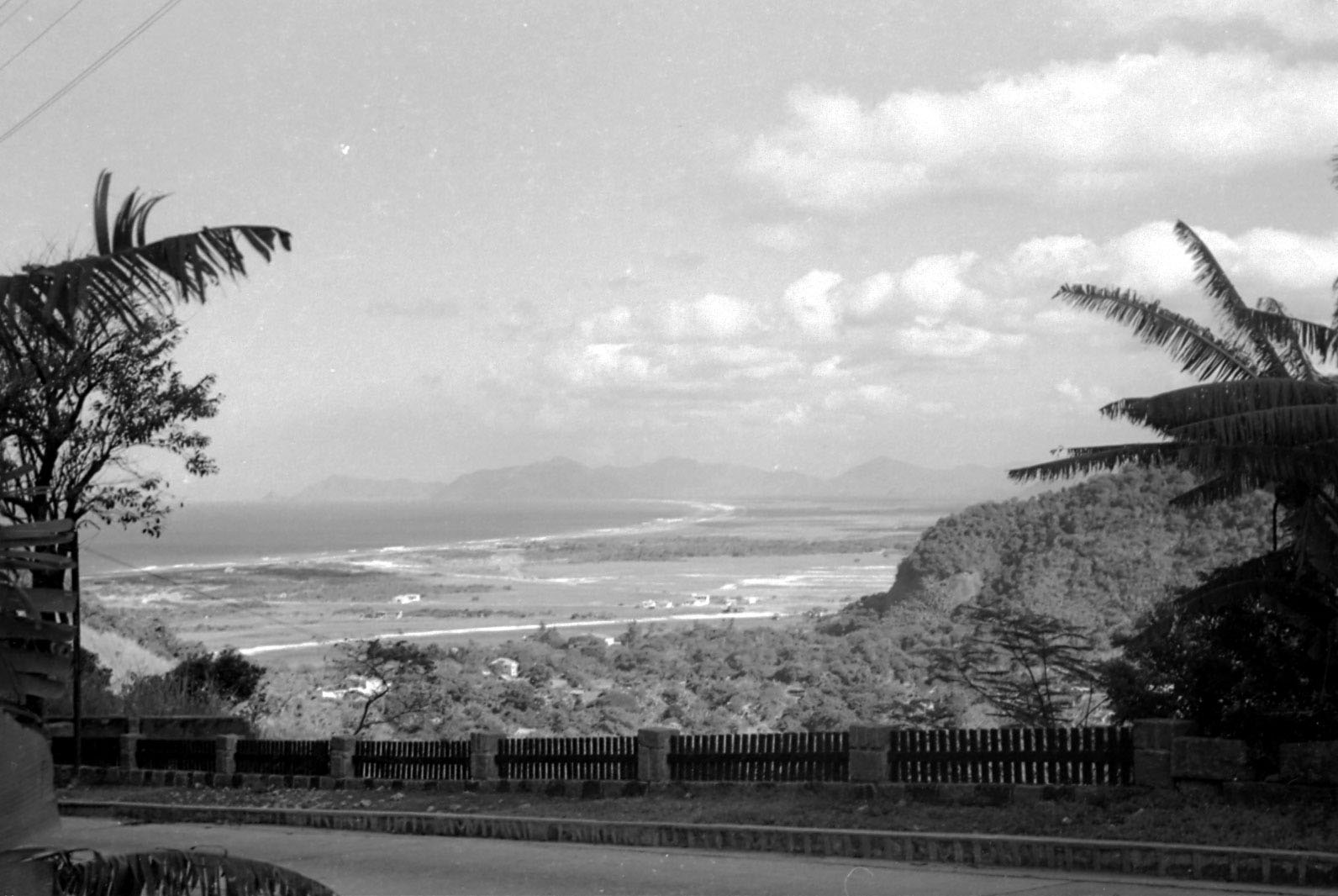
Barra da Tijuca in the 1950s

The region of Barra da Tijuca was originally a large beach, with typical undergrowth and sandbanks. The area, full of swamps and unsuitable for planting, remained unoccupied until the middle of the twentieth century, even though occasional groups of fishermen frequented the region. In 1667, the region was given to religious Benedictines, who settled only in the neighborhoods of Camorim, Vargem Pequena, and Vargem Grande. In 1900, the lands of Barra da Tijuca and Baixada Jacarepaguá were sold to the company Remedial Territorial Agricultural and SA, ESTA, which remains a large landowner in the area. The concentration of large tracts of land in the hands of a few was one of the causes of its late growth. Additionally, it is separated from the rest of the municipality by large, difficult-to-cross mountain ranges with peaks ranging from 800–1200 meters.

Development of the area took place initially on its two ends, in current Jardim Oceânico and in Recreio dos Bandeirantes. A bridge was then built by private initiative over the Tijuca Lagoon to serve the area's new inhabitants. Significant early development of Barra da Tijuca occurred during the administration of Governor Negrão de Lima, the former governor of the state of Guanabara, who commissioned Lúcio Costa, one of the region's urban designers. The plan for Barra in 1969 was similar to the earlier one for Brasília. It was inspired by the American urban planning style with wide boulevards and large open spaces.

In the 1970s, the Lagoa–Barra Highway was built, which allowed greater development since it reduced the time to go to the South Zone of the city of Rio. At the same time, large planned condominiums were developed in Barra, such as the condominiums Nova Ipanema and Novo Leblon. In the 1990s, another large urban development that enabled better connection with the North Zone of Rio was the creation of the Yellow Line, an expressway linking Barra da Tijuca to the Galeão International Airport. Since then, the growth of Barra da Tijuca has been characterized by large inflows of people from all parts of the metropolitan region of Rio de Janeiro.

=== Barra City's Project ===
During the 1980s, Barra da Tijuca experienced a population explosion, with virtually all the land along its boulevards occupied by large residential condominiums, parks, supermarkets, shopping malls, schools, and hospitals. The avenues were widened and received traffic lights. At this time, there was a movement for the declaration of Barra as a separate city; While there was a referendum to this effect, and a majority of voters voted to make it a separate city, turnout was too low for it to succeed.

There is still a bill in progress in the Legislative Assembly of Rio de Janeiro for the formation of a new Barra da Tijuca council from the region's districts (Barra, Recreio, Grumari, Vargem Pequena, Vargem Grande, Itanhangá, Joá e Camorim). The project, however, depends on the approval of the Federal Congressional bill PEC 13/03, which transfers to the states the power to legislate on this matter, as it was until 1996.

== Lifestyle ==
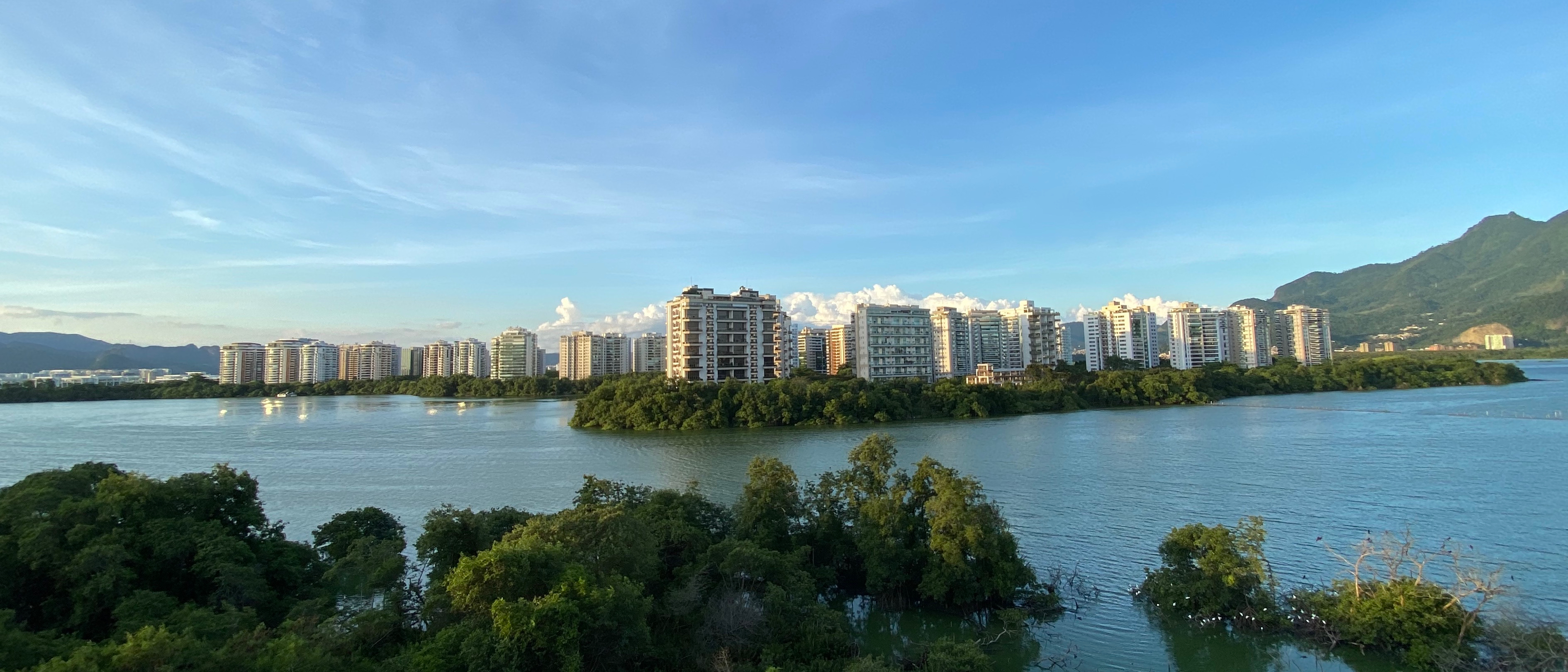
Península's residential towers.

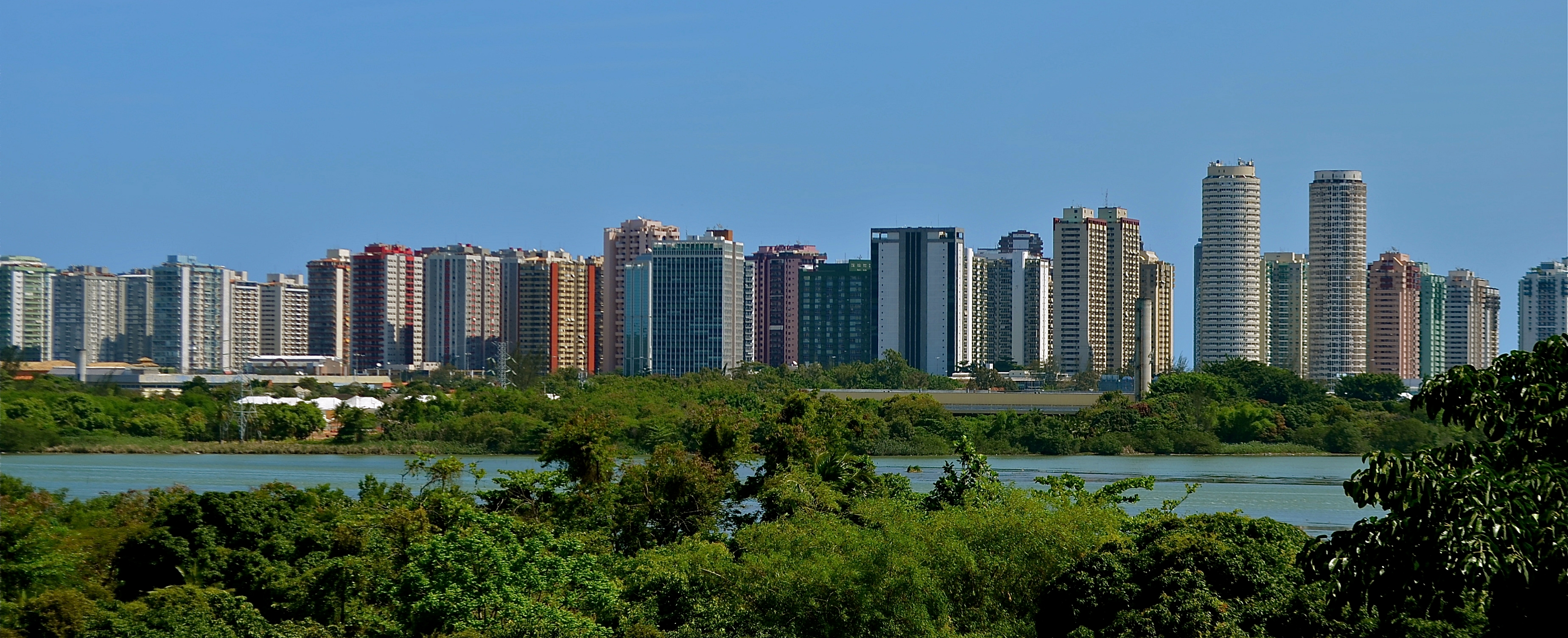
Jardim Oceânico

As the most recent region, built only about 30 years ago, Barra introduced a way of living characterized by large luxury condominiums with leisure infrastructure (sports courts, pools, private groves and lakes, spas, gyms) inside the condominium for the use of its residents and guests. The "neighborhood-condos", as they were named, have the idea of creating an exclusive neighborhood for its residents, making it possible for them to live a complete life without the need to leave the condominium. The condos also have a high security system to ensure the privacy and safety of its residents. The residential areas of Barra are also known as being environmentally friendly.

The region is characterized by a car culture, and is crossed by three main routes: the Avenue of the America - "Avenida das Américas" (the main road in the region, approximately 21 km long), "Avenida Ayrton Senna" (which connects the district of Barra and the Yellow Line, or 'Linha Amarela' highway) and "Avenida Lúcio Costa", formerly Sernambetiba Avenue, which follows the coastline.

== Areas ==
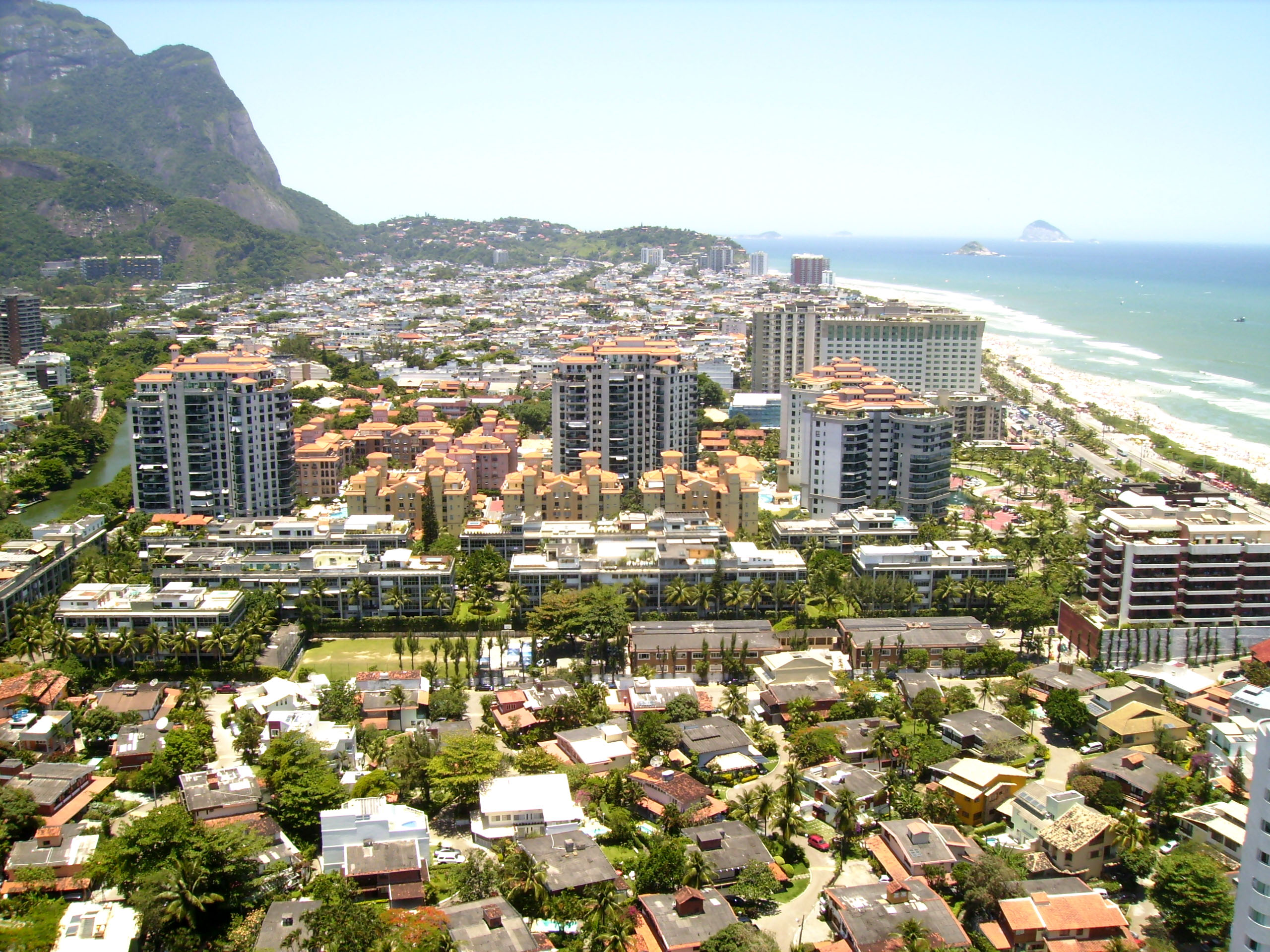
Houses in Barra da Tijuca

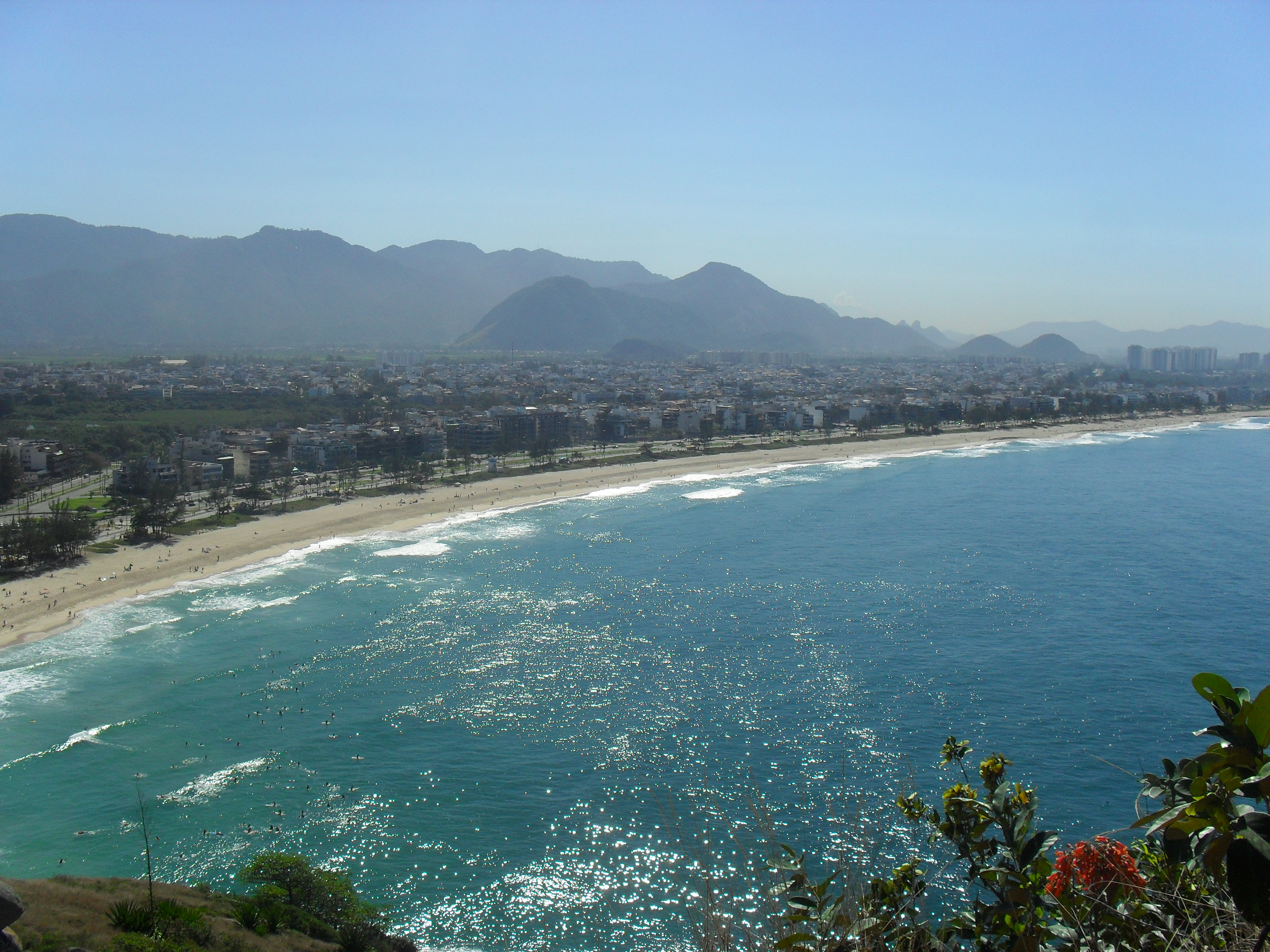
View of Recreio dos Bandeirantes, Barra da Tijuca, from Pontal's Island

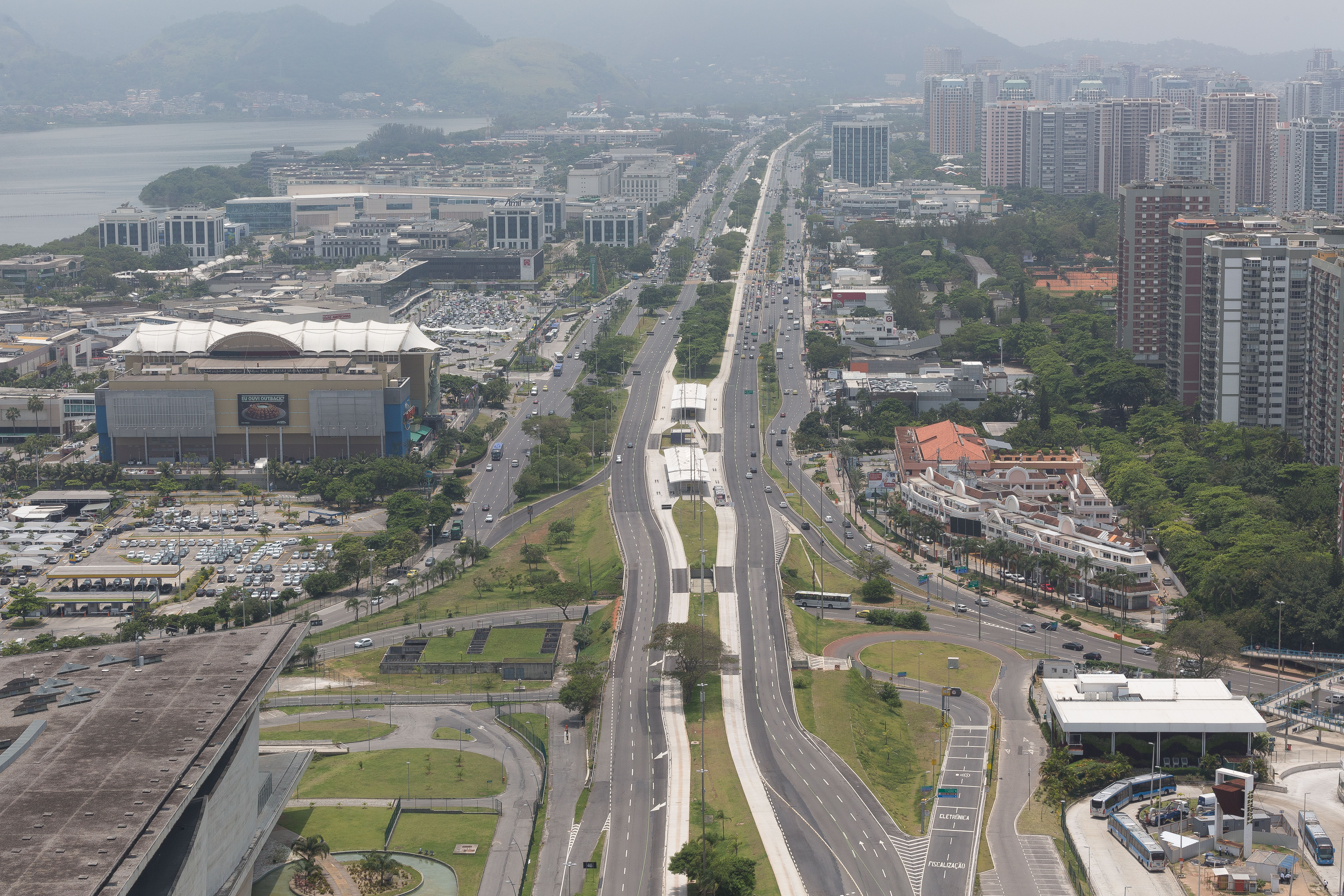
Avenida das Américas

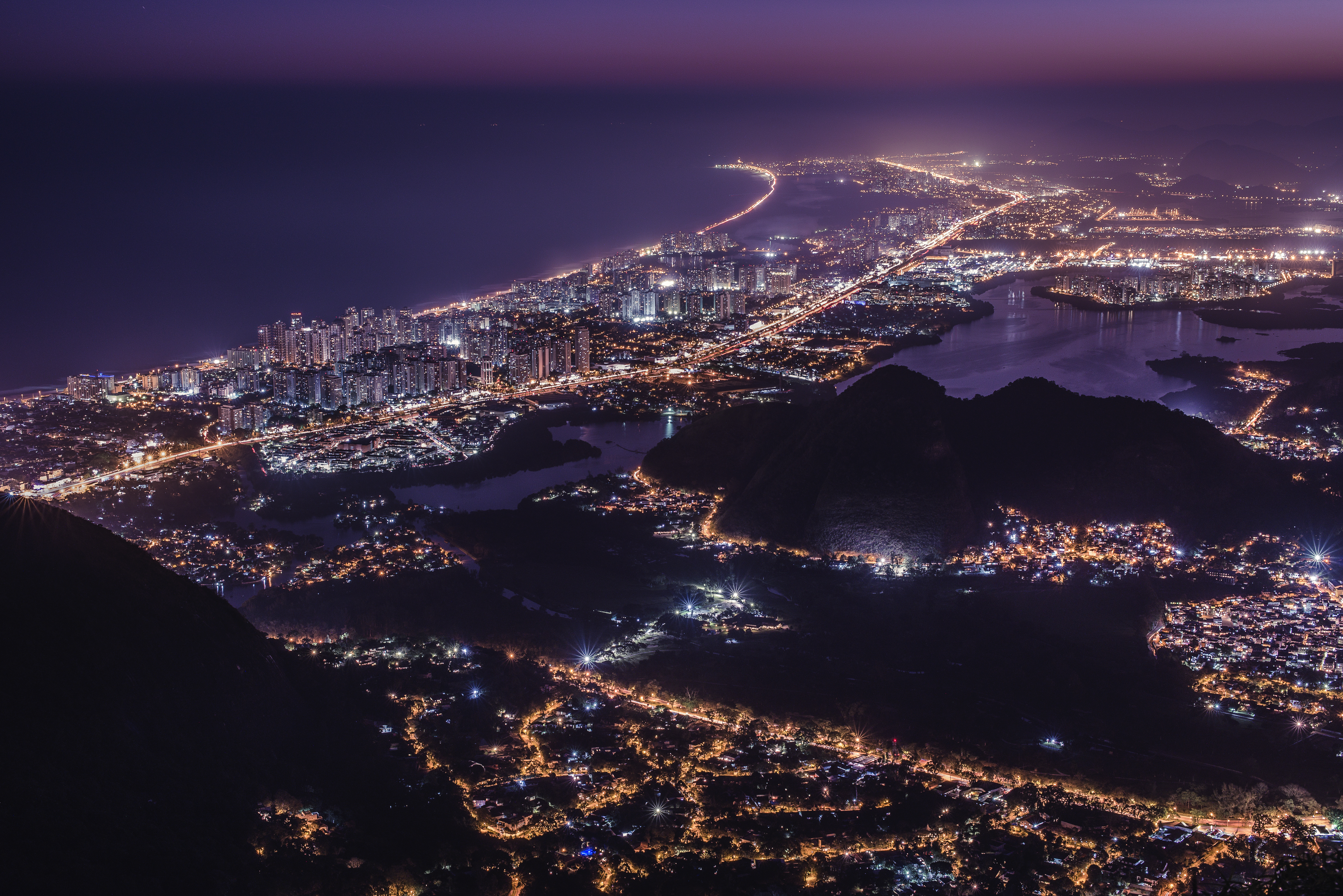
Barra da Tijuca at night

=== Jardim Oceânico ===
Jardim Oceânico (Portuguese: Ocean Garden) is a subdistrict of Barra da Tijuca. Predominantly formed by three-story buildings, it is an area similar to the South Zone of Rio de Janeiro. As part of the preparations for the Rio 2016 Olympics, a subway station was opened in the neighborhood. The mainly residential area is also home to several bars and restaurants on the Olegario Maciel and Erico Verissimo streets.

=== Península ===
Península was designed by a real estate company, the original project being the creation of a new environmentally friendly neighborhood called Península Barra. However, the project evolved from being a neighborhood to a massive private urban development complex, making the Península (which has the same size as Leblon's neighborhood) the newest and first eco-friendly urban development complex in Rio de Janeiro. Located in the heart of Barra, right behind the Barra Shopping in an area surrounded by its own private lake (Península Bay) and extensive leisure infrastructure, Península won the prize for the best urban development complex in Brazil. The complex, which still has some towers under construction, will consist at its completion of 62 residential towers, two business towers, a mini mall, five theme gardens, and two large parks. The real estate boom in Rio after the city was chosen for the 2016 Summer Olympics affected the prices in Península; researchers show that the prices have increased up to 300%, making the square meter in Península one of the most expensive in the city of Rio de Janeiro. The complex, considered one of the best family urban developments in the city, is now one of the favorite places of the celebrities of Rede Globo.

== Education ==
Several universities have a campus in the district, including Universidade Estácio de Sá, Pontifícia Universidade Católica, Universidade Gama Filho, Universidade Veiga de Almeida, Centro Universitário IBMR-Laureate and Instituto Brasileiro de Mercado de Capitais. Schools in the district include the Escola Suíço-Brasileira Rio de Janeiro.

== Shopping malls ==
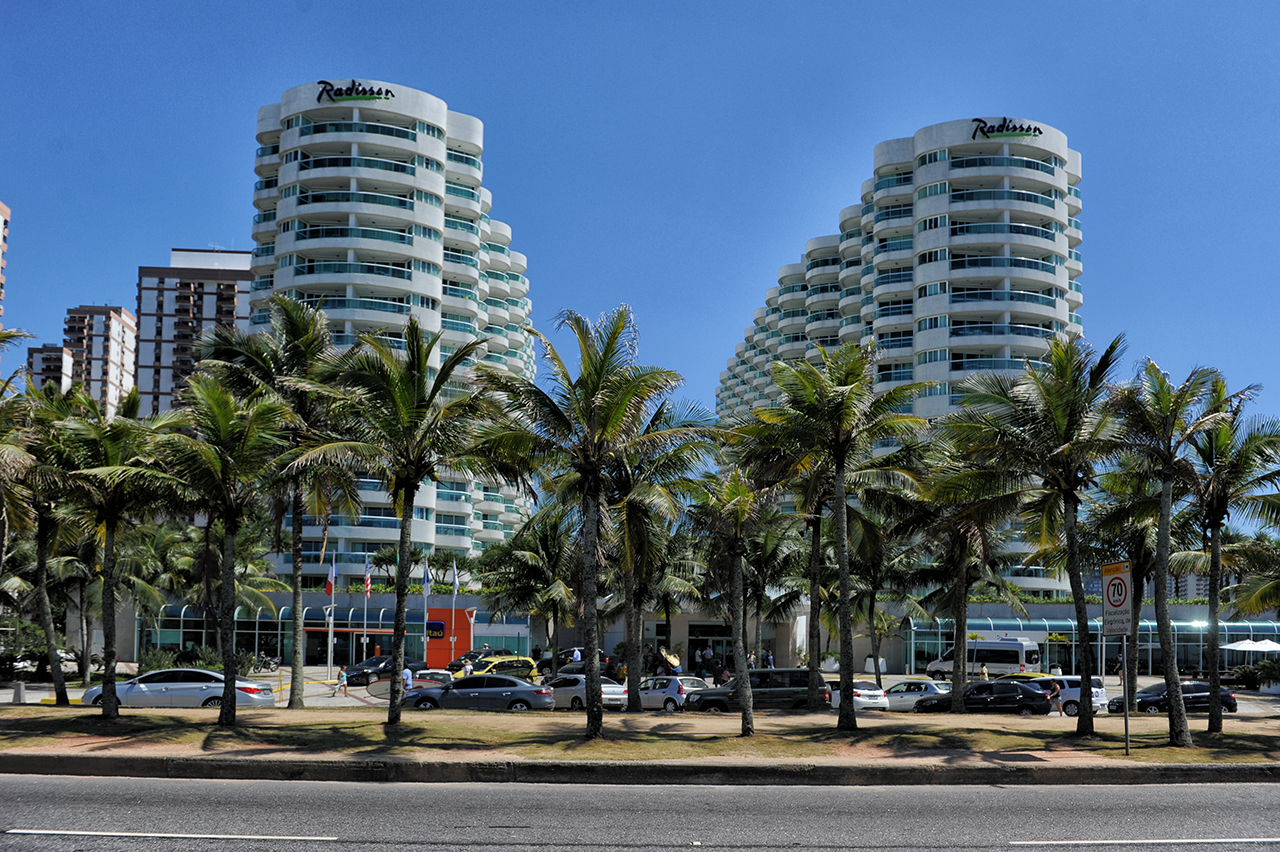
Lúcio Costa Avenue

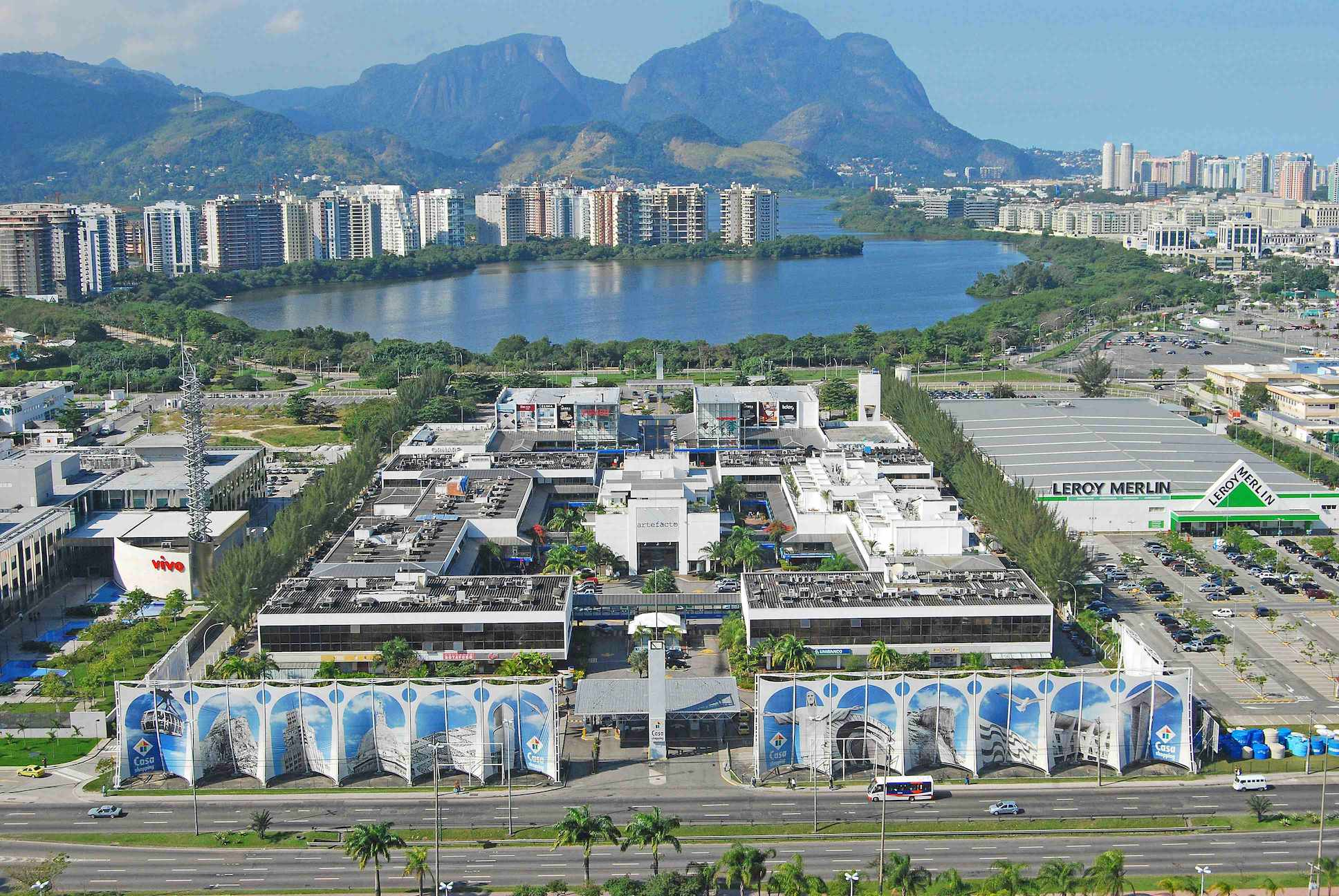
CasaShopping Mall

The neighborhood of Barra is home to many large modern malls, including Barra Shopping on Avenue of the Americas.

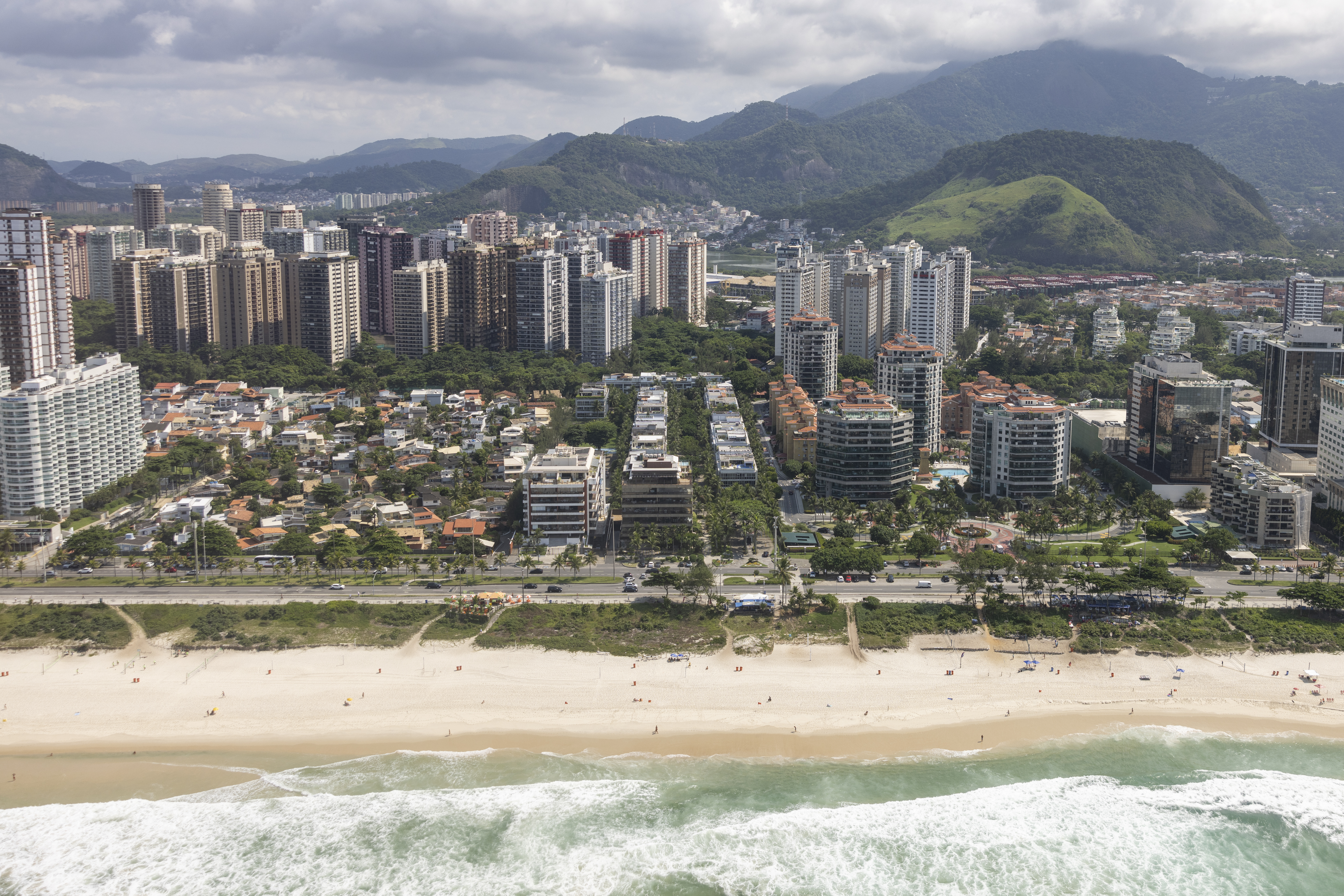
Barra da Tijuca Beach

== Transportation ==
There are three main avenues in Barra: Avenida das Américas (which connects almost the whole area of Barra), Avenida Ayrton Senna (formerly Avenida Alvorada, which connects Barra to Jacarepaguá neighbourhood) and Avenida Lúcio Costa (formerly Avenida Sernambetiba, which passes alongside the beach). The connection works of Barra with the rest of the urban network are among the most expensive works already carried out in Rio. Barra has many bus routes, and in 2009, Barra's subway line started to be built for the 2016 Rio Summer Olympics. Jacarepaguá Airport, an airport specialized in general aviation, is also located in the neighborhood.

== Sports ==
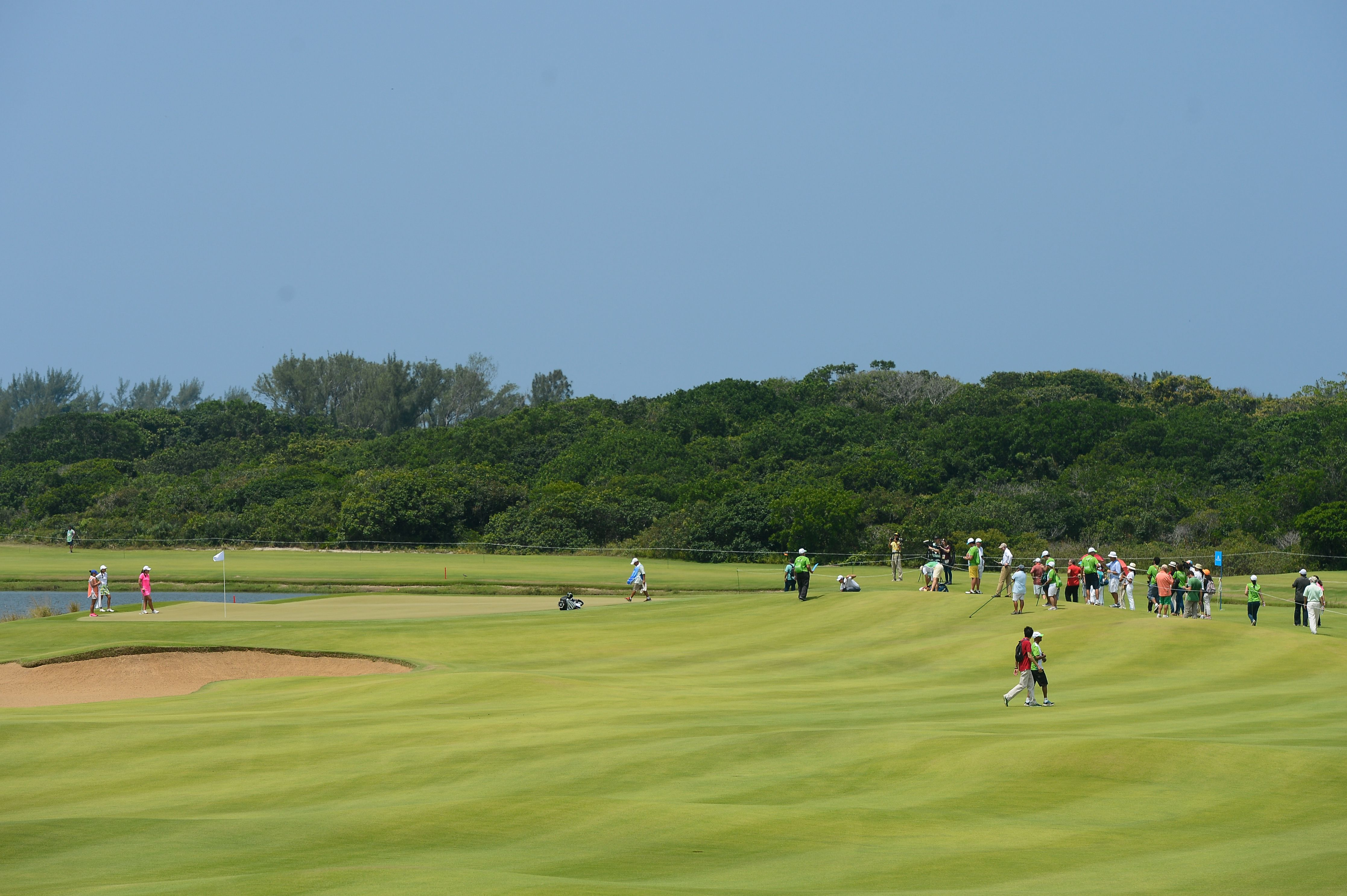
The Rio de Janeiro Olympic golf course

- The Brazilian Jiu-Jitsu academy Gracie Barra originated in Barra and is named after it.
- The 2007 Pan American Games and 2016 Summer Olympics and Paralympics took place for the most part in Barra, the latter featuring 12 permanent and three temporary venues.
- The football (soccer) club Barra da Tijuca Futebol Clube derives its name from the region. Its headquarters are located in neighbouring Camorim.
- Three major Associations' headquarters are located in Barra da Tijuca: the Brazilian Football Confederation, the Brazilian Volleyball Confederation and Brazilian Olympic Committee.
- The Golden Green Golf Club provides three-par six-hole court greens open to outside players with illumination for night play. Itanhanga Golf Club is also nearby.
- Surf competitions, such as Rio Marathon Surf Internacional, Festival Petrobras de Surfe, Campeonato Velox Surf Amador, and Circuito Petrobras, are held in Barra. There are several surfing schools in the neighbourhood, evidence of the popularity of this sport with the locals.
- The Aero Clube do Brasil provides parachuting experiences. The Rio Sport Center offers tennis courts to the public. Barrashopping and Barra Square are home to bowling alleys.
- There are several places where beach and court volleyball are practised. The Bernandinho's School is located in Barra.
- The numerous condos also offer several other sports courts exclusively for their residents.

== Beach ==
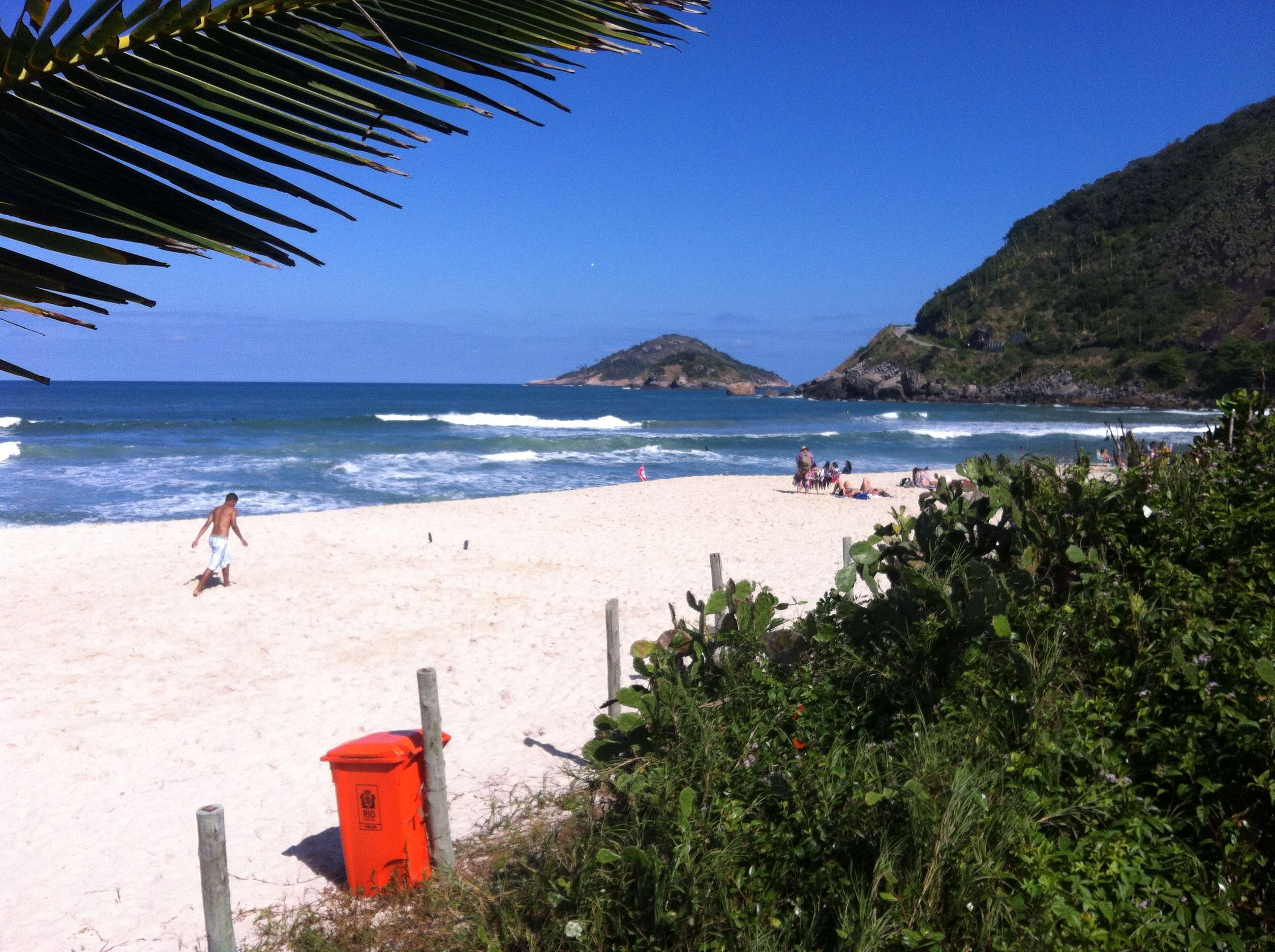
Prainha beach

The 18 km long beach is the largest of Rio de Janeiro's beaches. Barra's beach starts at Morro do Joá and ends at the Recreio dos Bandeirantes neighborhood, in Pontal de Sernambetiba, beyond Avenida Lúcio Costa. Most of its waters are clear and green and have an uncommon wave formation. Barra da Tijuca beach is one of the most sought-after beaches by surfers, windsurfers, bodyboarders, kitesurfers, and fishing enthusiasts. There is also a cycling lane along the beach. Pepê beach, closer to Morro do Joá, has kite surf schools, food kiosks, and surf schools.

== Culture ==
=== Teatro dos Grandes Atores ===
The Teatro dos Grandes Atores (Great Actors Theater) is located in the Shopping Barra Square mall. It has a small 35 square metres (380 sq ft) foyer, and two auditoriums, each with 396 seats, the Blue Room and the Red Room. Both have good acoustics and balconies that give good views of the stage. The theater opened in 1995 with Aparecida Margarida, with Marília Pêra, in the Blue Room and A Era do Rádio directed by Sérgio Britto in the Red Room. Ricardo Torres was staged here in 1996. Since 2009, the theater has partnered with Agência do Bem, and since 2011 has let the agency's Orquestra Nova Sinfonia, a youth orchestra, use its stage for rehearsals.

== Criticism ==
The influence from different countries is criticized by many citizens from the older areas of Rio de Janeiro, especially concerning the 26.8 meters (88 feet) high replica of the Statue of Liberty in the New York City Center. Barra also has replicas of many international architectural icons like the Leaning Tower of Pisa, the Tower Bridge of London, and the Eiffel Tower of Paris (all found in the Barra World Shopping Center).

== In popular culture ==
Barra da Tijuca (and its luxury condominiums, considered the trademark of Barra da Tijuca) is a recurring theme in Brazilian films, TV series, and documentaries, mainly because it portrays (sometimes in a light and funny way, sometimes more darkly and seriously) the lives of upper-middle-class and upper-class residents who live there. Among the films and series that take place there are:

- In the Rede Globo telenovela Laços de Família (2000-2001), Barra da Tijuca is home to the family of Alma Flora Pirajá de Albuquerque (Marieta Severo), her fourth husband Danilo Menezes (Alexandre Borges) and her nephew and niece Edu (Reynaldo Gianecchini) and Estela Monteiro Fernandes (Júlia Almeida). Barra da Tijuca is portrayed as a highly affluent neighborhood, to an even greater extent than Leblon: while the latter is inhabited mostly by apartment-dwelling upper-middle-class families with salaried occupations, the family of Alma Flora Pirajá de Albuquerque lives in a large house with a swimming pool, and its members enjoy the benefits of inherited wealth.
- The Rede Globo popular sitcom Toma Lá, Dá Cá (2007-2009), starring Miguel Falabella (who is also the co-creator of the series), Adriana Esteves, Marisa Orth and Diogo Vilela portrays the lives of the residents of Jambalaya Ocean Drive, a high-end condominium from Barra da Tijuca as they get into various fun (and sometimes bizarre and embarrassing) situations, while trying to deal with their dysfunctional families and a crazy manager.
- The 2011/2012 Rede Globo hit soap opera, Fina Estampa, has Barra da Tijuca as its main setting, as it is there that the characters in the soap opera, mainly the protagonist Griselda "Pereirão" da Silva Pereira (played by Lília Cabral) and the main antagonist, Tereza Cristina Buarque Siqueira de Velmont (played by Christiane Torloni) resides and where most of the plot of Fina Estampa takes place.
- The 2013 documentary Sorria, Você Está na Barra! portrays the history, current context, and day-to-day life of Barra da Tijuca through some of its most famous residents, such as Fernando Gabeira, Adriana Bombom and Letícia Spiller.
- The 2014 drama film Casa Grande, starring Thales Cavalcanti, Marcello Novaes and Suzana Pires, portrays the forbidden romance between an upper-middle-class boy from Barra da Tijuca and a lower-class girl from a favela while trying to deal with an economic crisis that affects his family relationship.
- The 2015 thriller film Mate-me por Favor (Please Kill Me in English), starring Valentina Herszage and Dora Freind, depicts the lives of wealthy young people who live there and their lives in high school as they try to discover who is behind a series of brutal murders.
- The 2018 Amazon Prime Video documentary Palace II – 3 Quartos com Vista para o Mar portrays the story of Palace II, a high-end condominium that collapsed on February 28, 1998 (killing nine people and leaving more than 170 families homeless) and the struggle of the victims' families and survivors in search of justice against those responsible for this tragedy (mainly Sergio Naya, the architect responsible for building Palace II).
- The main character of Netflix's 2021 teen romantic comedy film Confissões de uma Garota Excluída, Teanira "Tetê" de Oliveira (Klara Castanho) is a 16-year-old teenage girl from Barra da Tijuca who ends up being forced to move to her grandparents' house in Copacabana (South Zone of Rio de Janeiro) after her parents became unemployed.
- Netflix's 2022 comedy-drama series Maldivas, starring Bruna Marquezine, Manu Gavassi, Carol Castro, Sheron Menezzes, Vanessa Gerbelli and Natália Klein (who is also the series' creator) tells the story of a young woman from the interior who finds herself moves to Rio de Janeiro to investigate the suspicious death of her mother and ends up living in Maldivas, a luxury condominium located in Barra da Tijuca and whose residents hide secrets that could ruin their apparently perfect lives.
- The 2024 comedy film Mãe, sequestraram a babá, starring Cláudia Alencar and Letícia Pedro, depicts the story of the kidnapping of Magdalena, an Argentine cryptocurrency investor based in Brazil who works as a nanny for a business couple who live in a luxury condominium in Barra da Tijuca.
- The Globoplay anthology series Os Outros has as its main setting for its two seasons the luxury condominiums of Barra da Tijuca and the conflicts between the residents who live there:
  - In the 1st season, the story takes place in the luxury condominium Barra Diamond
  - In the 2nd season, the plot takes place in the high-end condominium Barra Star Dream.
- Netflix's ongoing sitcom A Sogra que te Pariu has as its main setting a mansion in Barra da Tijuca, as that is where Carlos (Rafael Zulu), the son of the sitcom's protagonist, Dona Isadir (Rodrigo Sant'Anna), lives and where she ends up moving due to the COVID-19 pandemic.

== See also ==
- List of upscale shopping districts
