= Attitude Baptist Church =

- Igreja Batista Atitude
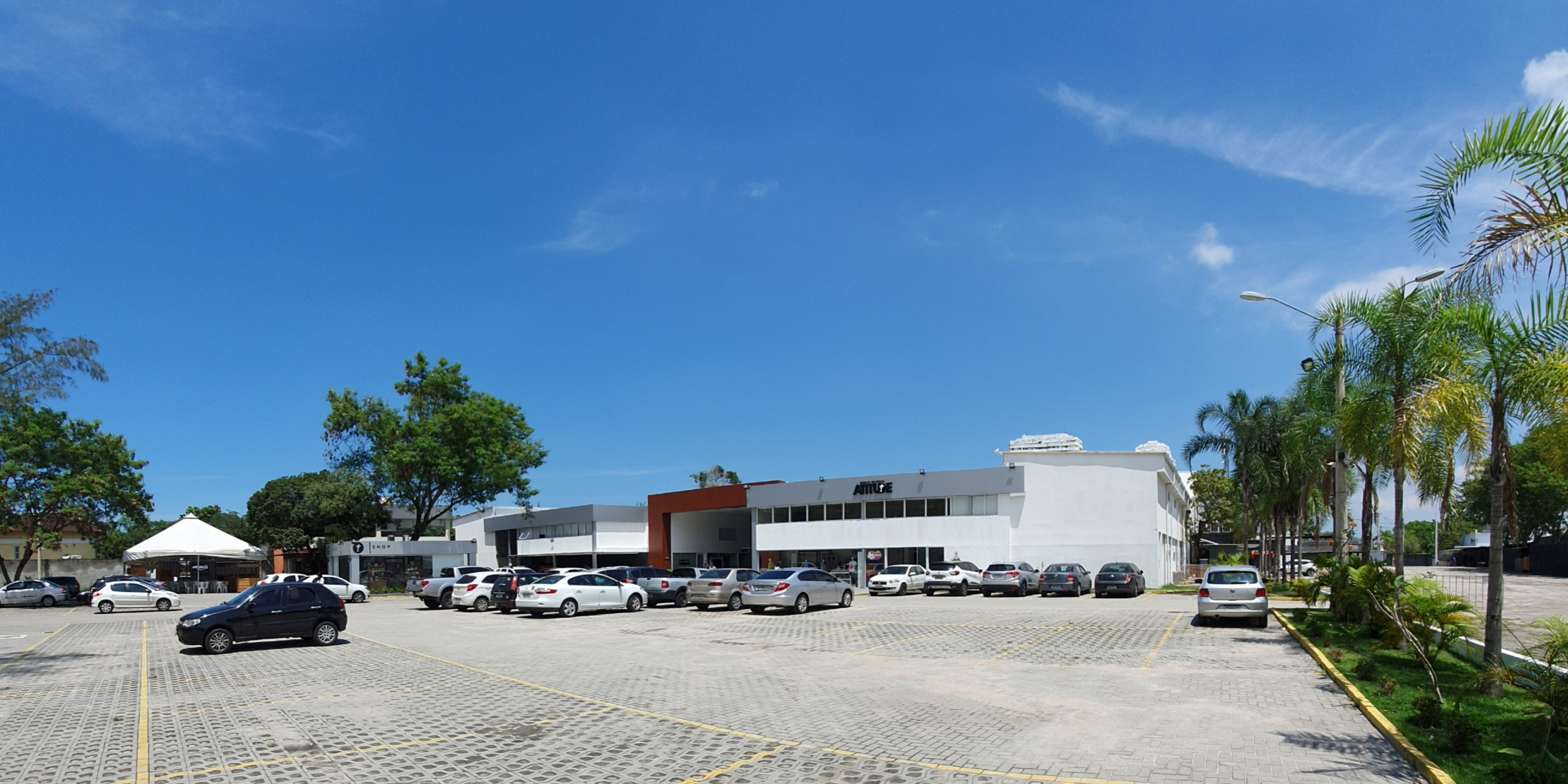
- Attitude Baptist Church, Barra da Tijuca

- Location within Rio de Janeiro Location within Brazil
- 23°00′26″S 43°25′54″W
- Country: Brazil
- Denomination: Baptist
- Churchmanship: Evangelical
- Website: igrejabatistaatitude.com.br

History
- Founded: 4 June 2000
- Founder(s): Edgar F. Hallock, Jr.

Attitude Baptist Church (Portuguese: Igreja Batista Atitude) is a Baptist multi-site megachurch based in Rio de Janeiro, in Brazil. It is affiliated with the Brazilian Baptist Convention. Josué Vallandro Jr. is its current Pastor.

== History ==
Attitude Baptist Church started as a Community Mission in the neighbourhood of Itanhangá, Rio de Janeiro by the International Mission Board missionary Edgar F. Hallock, Jr. Initially the Mission met in a rented room of a University nearby and later at a public school. On 4 June 2000, sponsored by the First Baptist Church in Barra, the Mission was organized as the Central Barra Baptist Church with 32 members. The church has established other campuses in different cities across the country. The church has inaugurated a main auditorium with 4,000 seats.

== Congregations and Leadership ==
Since 27 September 2003 the Church is led by its pastor-president, Josué Valandro de Oliveira Jr., and each of its daughter-churches is led by a pastor.

The Church meets regularly in 13 congregations in 4 different Brazilian States, 1 in the United States and 1 in Canada. They are:

| Country and State | City and District | Name | Leader | Organized | Note |
|---|---|---|---|---|---|
| Brazil; Espírito Santo | Vitória; Praia | Vitória | Pastor; Bruno Simplício | 18 September 2017 | |
| Brazil; Minas Gerais | Belo Horizonte; Buritis | Belo Horizonte | Pastor; Elmo Guimarães | 19 May 2019 | |
| Brazil; Piauí | São Raimundo Nonato; Centro | São Raimundo Nonato | Pastor; José Busch^{a} | 26 July 2019 | |
| Brazil; Rio de Janeiro | Cordeiro; Senna Campos | Cordeiro | Pastor; Áquila Lima | 21 January 2018 | |
| Brazil; Rio de Janeiro | Duque de Caxias; Vila São Luiz | Duque de Caxias | Pastor; Felipe Rangel | 13 December 2015 | |
| Brazil; Rio de Janeiro | Magé; Piabetá | Piabetá | Pastor; Hugo Freire | | |
| Brazil; Rio de Janeiro | Nova Iguaçu; Luz | Nova Iguaçu | Pastor; Rubem Teixeira | 7 October 2018 | |
| Brazil; Rio de Janeiro | Petrópolis; Centro | Petrópolis | Pastor; Juliano Loureiro | 5 August 2018 | |
| Brazil; Rio de Janeiro | Rio de Janeiro; Barra da Tijuca | Barra da Tijuca | Pastor-President; Josué Valandro Jr.^{b} | 4 June 2000 | Main Church |
| Brazil; Rio de Janeiro | Rio de Janeiro; Ilha de Guaratiba | Guaratiba | Pastor; Felipe Brás | 31 December 2017 | |
| Brazil; Rio de Janeiro | Rio de Janeiro; Ilha do Governador | Ilha do Governador | Pastor; Everton Louvize | 11 July 2019 | |
| Brazil; Rio de Janeiro | Rio de Janeiro; Vargem Grande | Vargem Grande | Pastor; Paulo Costa; Pastor; Josiane Costa | 20 December 2015 | |
| Brazil; Rio de Janeiro | Rio de Janeiro; Ipanema | Zona Sul | Pastor; Vinicius Vianna^{c} | 5 February 2017 | |
| Canada; British Columbia | Vancouver | Vancouver | Pastor; Max Ferreira | 6 January 2019 | |
| United States; Florida | Orlando | Orlando | Pastor; Salleh Cader | 9 August 2015 | |

a. Predecessor: Pr. Achilles Schachter between 26 July 2019 and March, 2020.
b. Predecessor: Pr. Edgar F. Hallock, Jr. between 4 June 2000 and 8 June 2001.
c. Predecessor: Pr. Leandro Barros between 5 February 2017 and 10 August 2020.

== Media ==
Attitude Baptist has a weekly program called Attitude Time (Tempo de Atitude) broadcast on Saturday mornings at 10:30AM by RedeTV!. Worships and some activities are broadcast in social media such as Facebook, Youtube and Instagram.

== Public Exposure ==
One of the most well-known members of Attitude Baptist Church is the current First Lady of Brazil Michelle Bolsonaro, formerly an interpreter and member of the Church Ministry in Brazilian Sign Language. Together with his wife, the former President of Brazil Jair Bolsonaro has attended services in Barra da Tijuca.

== Gallery ==
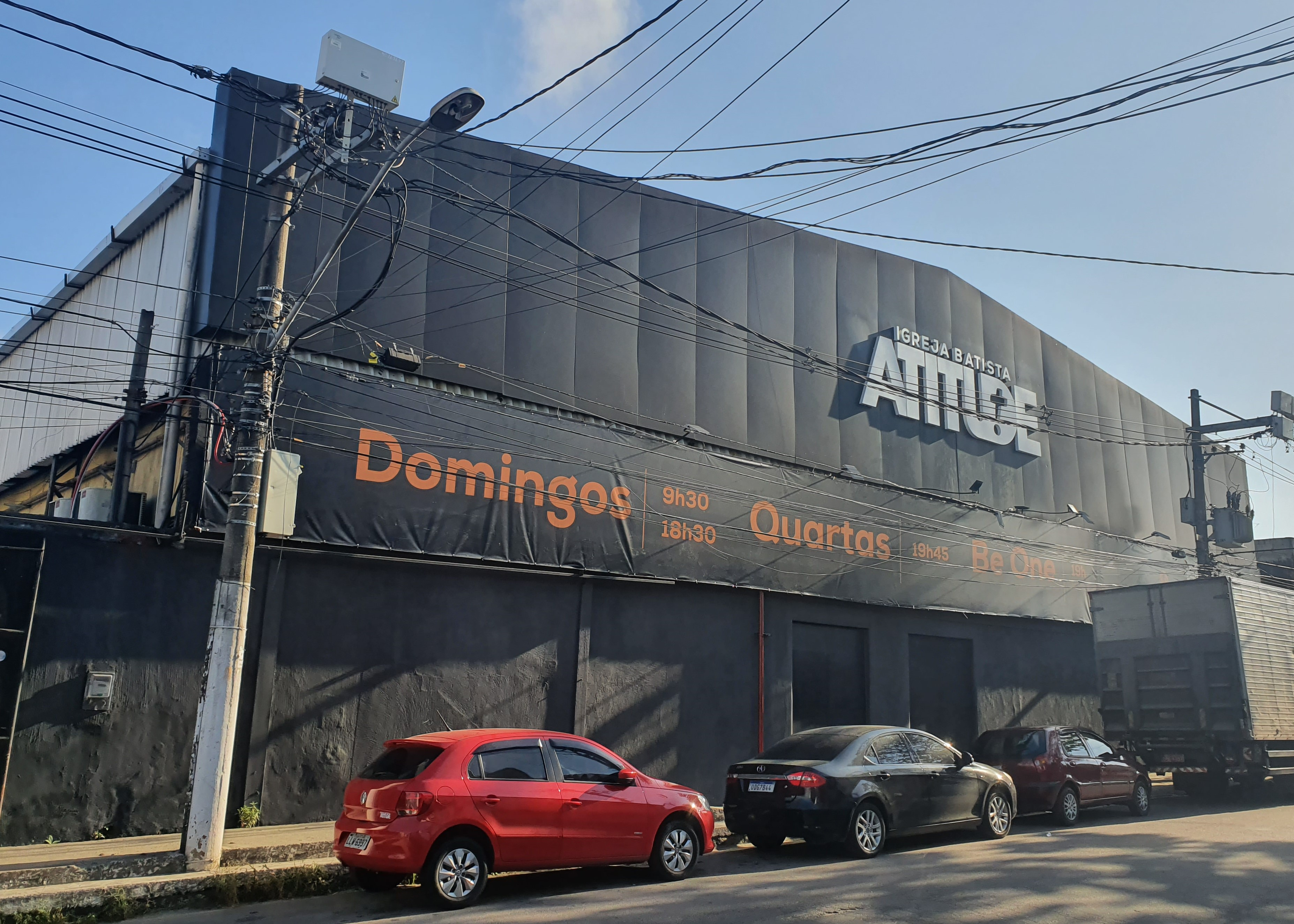
Duque de Caxias

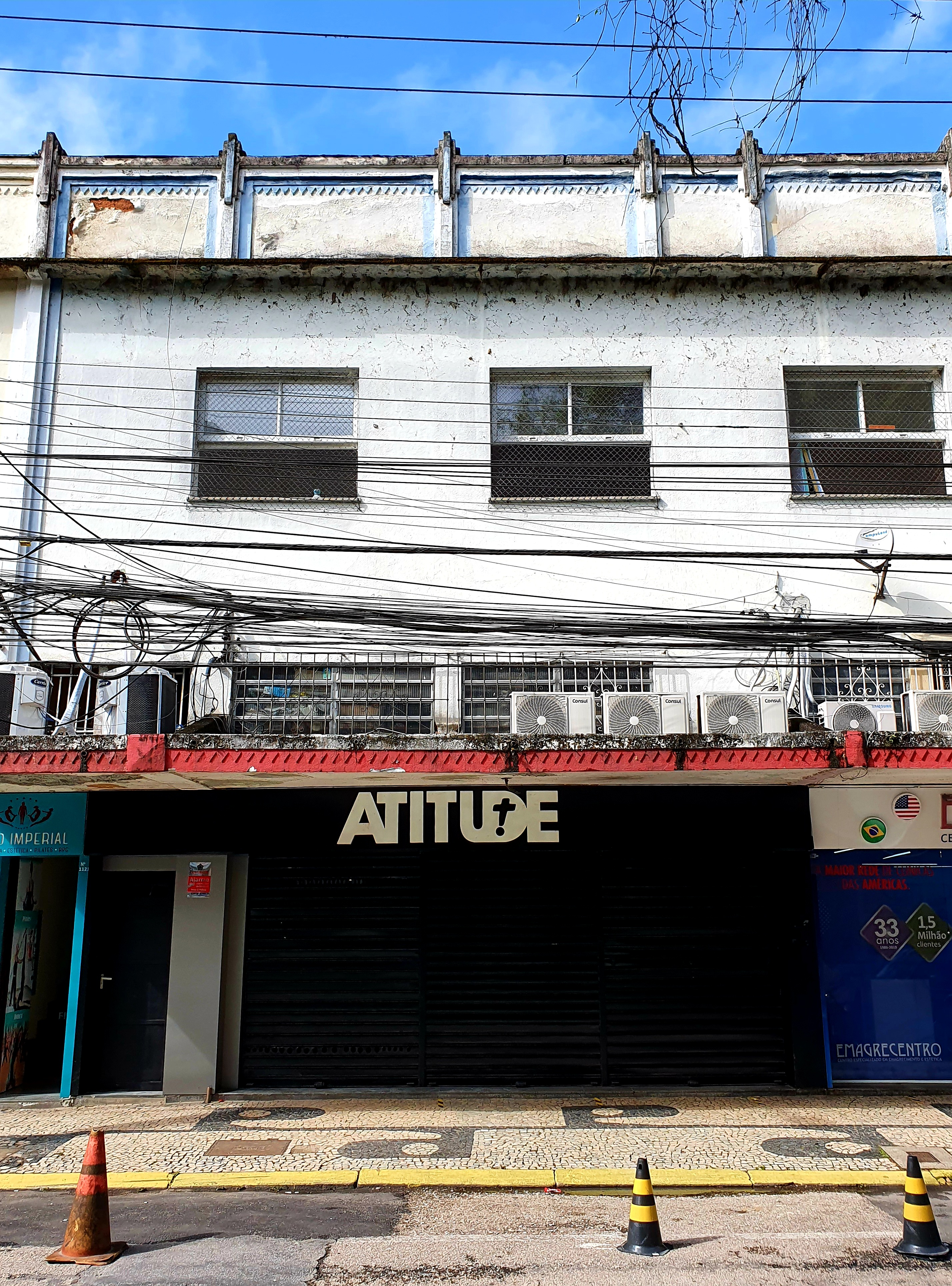
Petrópolis

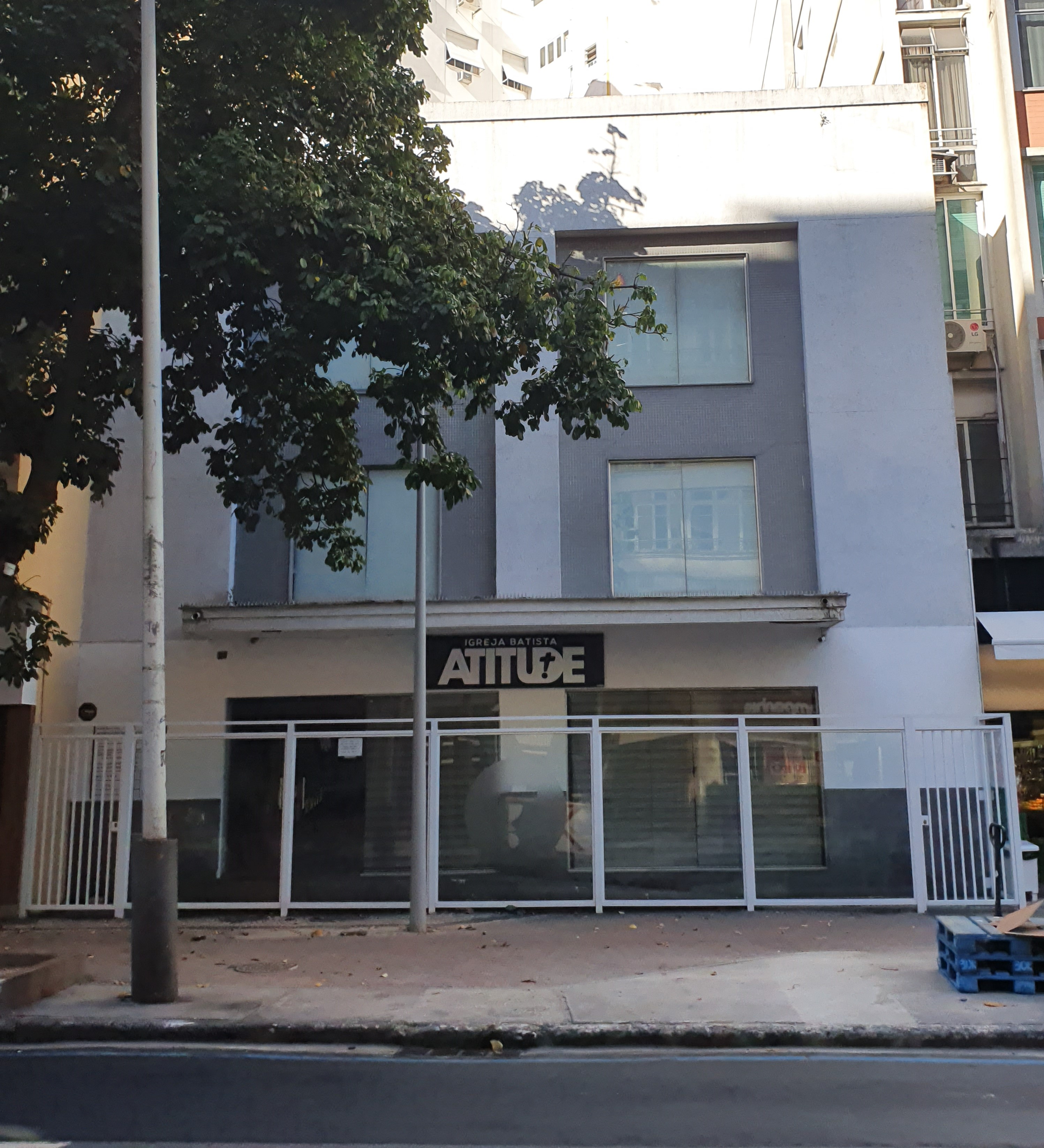
Zona Sul
