= Península (Rio de Janeiro) =

Human settlement in Brazil

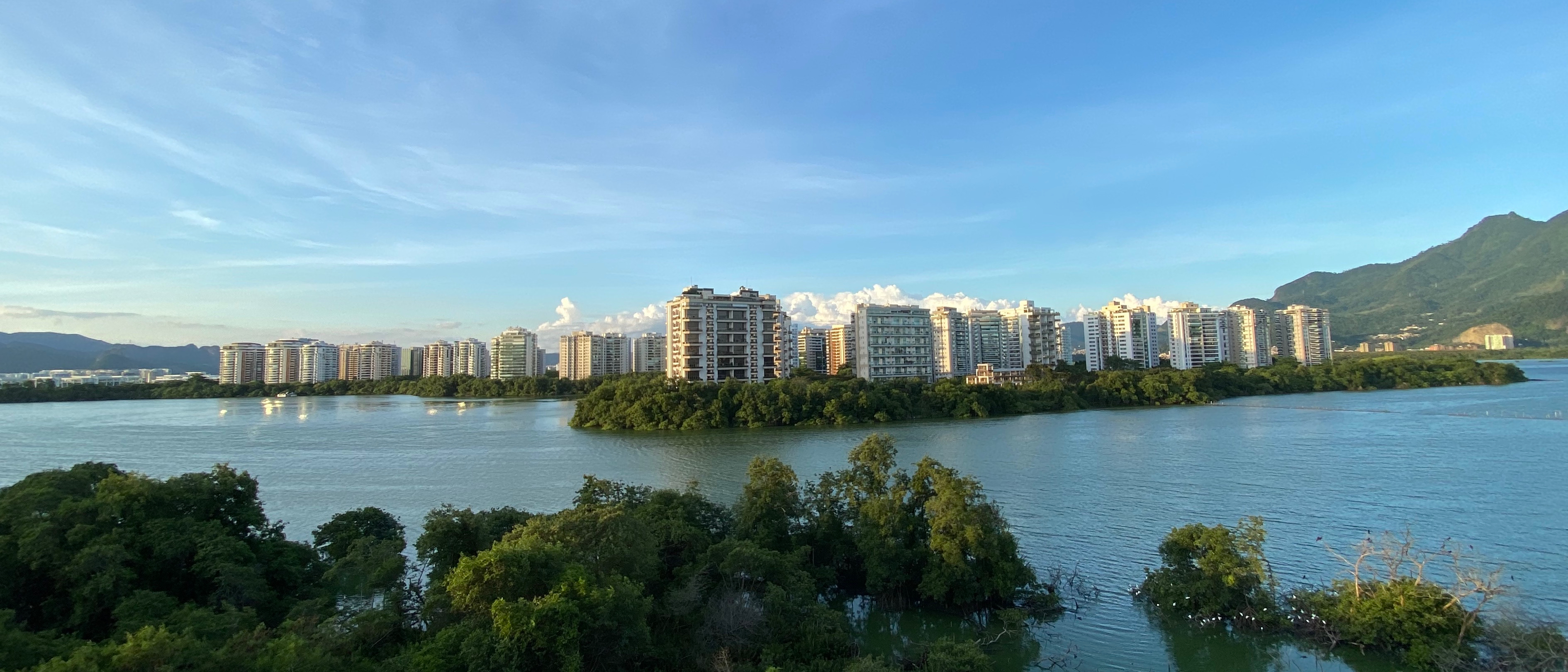
View of Península from the VillageMall shopping center, in 2019

Península is a sub-district located at Barra da Tijuca, in Rio de Janeiro, which occupies an area of 8,395,850 square feet (780,000 m^{2}). It has an estimated population of 28,000 people with low ground occupancy rate – 8% of built area.

It became known due to its practical importance for the study of modern urbanization in Brazilian architecture – with the concept of sustainable development, currently under study in architecture courses. The area was built following the project of Fernando Chacel – important Brazilian landscape architect and student of Burle Marx. It is an area that grew with the use of sustainable development, based on Chacel's project, with the strong presence of nature in the region.

The sub-district, with low occupancy and sustainable development, has a Human Development Index (HDI) higher than Barra da Tijuca's.

== Localization ==
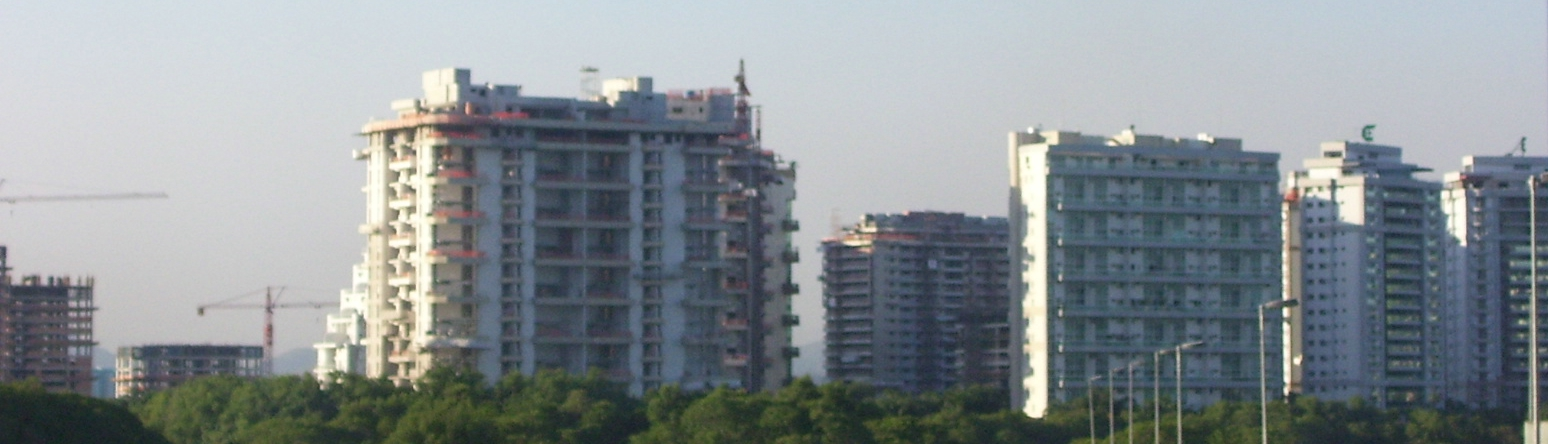
Photo of Península in 2007, with plenty of buildings still under construction

It is the formation of a peninsula in the Lagoa da Tijuca, with access by both land and water (pier).

It's located near the shopping malls CasaShopping, Barra Shopping, Via Parque, Village Mall, and the offices O2 Corporate Offices, and CEO Offices linked to them by water and land. The area of Península has two entrances and two exits by land, not being an area of free circulation.

The chapel Capela de Santo Antônio, launched in 2011 and affiliated with the matrix of church of Notre-Dame-des-Victoires, is located within the sub-district.

== Economic data ==
The Península area consists of new buildings (from 2000), with an HDI (Human Development Index) superior to that of Barra da Tijuca itself, notoriously occupied by the upper class.

== Culture ==
The incorporation of the Península area was made with the permanent ornamentation from Franz Weissmann, Gerchman, Caciporé Torres, Sônia Eblin, Ascânio MMM, Emmanuel Araujo, and Mário Agostinelli in the ecological parks within the sub-district.

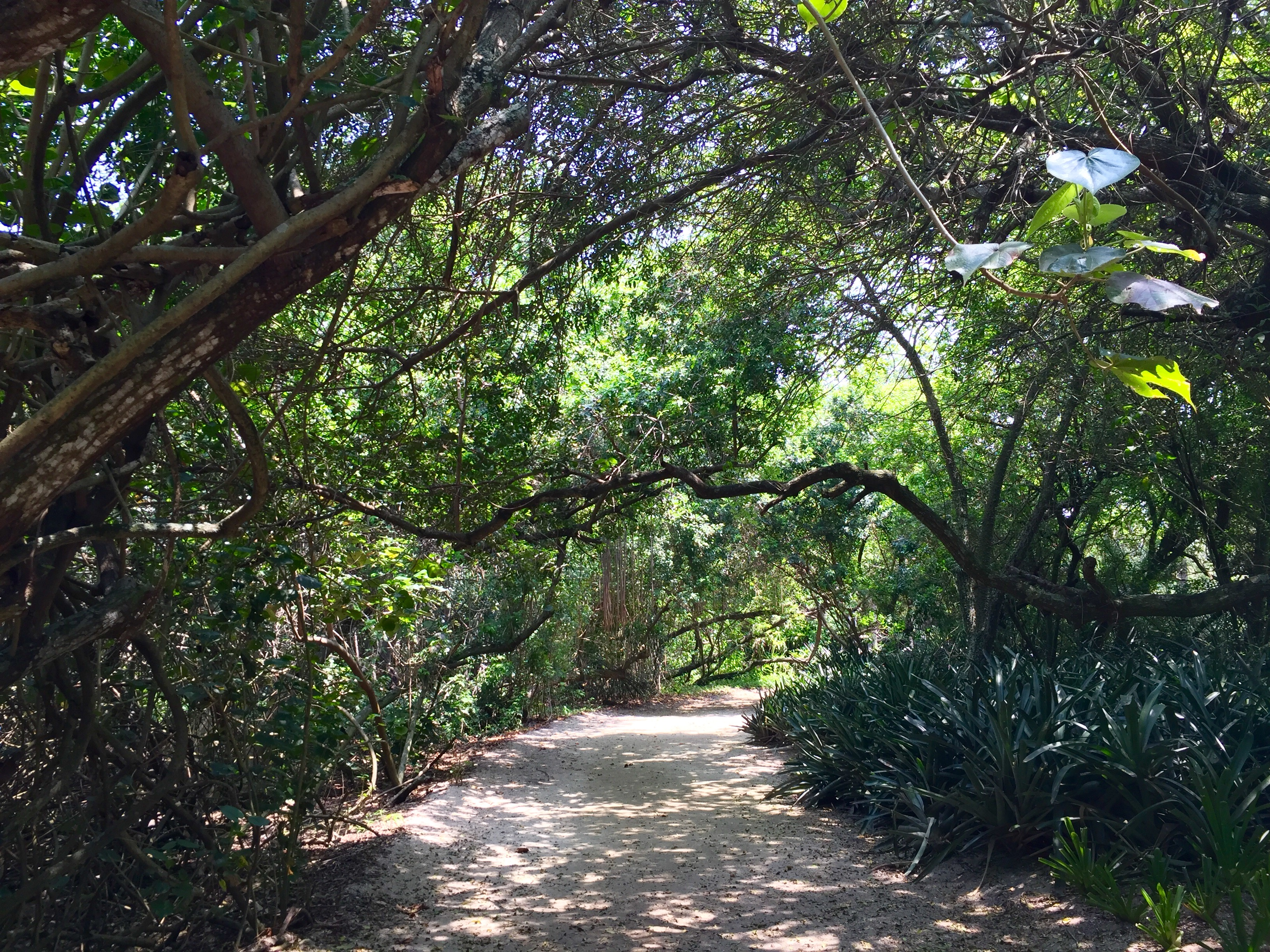
Jardim das Frutíferas, one of the many gardens of Península.

== Environment ==
The landscaping project of Península was work of Fernando Chacel. It is estimated that the total time for preparation of the Península's terrain for urbanization was approximately 20 years.

With the use of sustainable development, the area was prepared for conscientious occupation of land, being a unique project in Brazil. The low occupancy rate allowed the growth to be sustainable and eco-friendly.

Some points that highlight the care with the Peninsula consolidation project is that it was made taking into account the treatment of sewage and using dams to prevent gigogas proliferation. The area is surrounded by a grove and the gardens are constantly preserved, as an incentive to the native fauna.
