= National Baptist Convention, Brazil =

The National Baptist Convention (Conveção Batista Nacional) is a Baptist Christian denomination, affiliated with the Baptist World Alliance and Brazilian Evangelical Christian Alliance. The CBN have many churches and make theological lectures, like "Seminário Teológico Batista Nacional" at São Paulo.

== History ==
It started with a group of 52 Baptist churches in Brazil, who joined together in 1965, that accept the Evangelical charismatic doctrine of gifts of Holy Spirit in their beliefs. According to a census published by the association in 2023, it claimed 2,730 churches and 403,318 members.

== See also ==
- Born again
- Baptist beliefs
- Bapticostal
- Believers' Church
- Protestantism in Brazil
