= Bapticostal movement =

Movement in some Baptist churches

The Bapticostal movement is a movement in some Baptist churches towards adopting certain elements of the charismatic movement. The word Bapticostal is a combination of Baptist and Pentecostal. The term has been used in a limited manner to describe a worship style of high-tempo Contemporary Christian music accompanied with spontaneous shouts, clapping and hand raising. But it also describes those churches where members profess to have and exhibit the charismatic gifts that are practiced in Pentecostalism such as speaking in tongues, being slain in the Spirit, or being granted a word of knowledge. The prevalence of such beliefs within Baptist churches worldwide is unknown. In some unions or conventions it hardly exists (e.g. Eastern Europe) but in others (Australia, New Zealand) it is common. In the United States, it has been estimated that among Southern Baptist churches, 5% of the churches could be classified as Bapticostal, and the numbers are growing. According to a study in 1989, 69% of Baptist churches belonging to the Baptist Union of New Zealand, the main Baptist association in New Zealand, identified positively with the charismatic movement.

== Southern Baptist response ==
While the Bapticostal movement may be gaining support with individual churches in the convention, the movement has been met with official opposition. In 1999, a regional Southern Baptist association of churches expelled the Calvary Baptist Church in Marshfield, Missouri for the church teaching and exhibition of speaking in tongues and church members being slain in the Spirit.

More recently, in 2006 the International Mission Board passed standards for missionaries which would disqualify those who espoused opposition to traditional Southern Baptist doctrines of eternal security and a rejection of a salvific view of baptism, and also engaged in speaking in tongues or had a "private prayer language".

Following the new qualification of missionary appointments, the Rev. Dwight McKissic gave a sermon during a chapel service to students attending Southwestern Baptist Theological Seminary and announced that he speaks in tongues and uses a private prayer language and emphasized not taking a cessationist view of the charismatic gifts. Southwestern quickly distanced itself from McKissic's comments saying,

"Rev. McKissic’s interpretation of tongues as 'ecstatic utterance' is not a position that we suspect would be advocated by most faculty or trustees. In keeping with Baptist convictions regarding religious liberty, we affirm Rev. McKissic’s right to believe and advocate his position. Equally in keeping with our emphasis of religious liberty we reserve the right not to disseminate openly views which we fear may be harmful to the churches."

However, shortly after his election as president of the Convention, Rev. Frank Page expanded on his "big tent" view of Southern Baptists by saying,

"Churches must deal with charismatic issues and theology as a part of their own autonomous structure. I think that many charismatics function well within traditional Southern Baptist churches. In fact, we have several in our church. Some are more vocal and sometimes disruptive. Churches must deal with those kinds of attitudes on a case by case basis. Trustee bodies must do the same."

Mike Huckabee in describing his home church said in a sermon on December 2, 2007, "we tend to be a little Bapticostal where I go."

== National Baptist Convention ==
The National Baptist Convention, the largest predominantly African-American Baptist denomination in the United States, does not have any official beliefs or standpoints regarding Pentecostal and charismatic expressions of worship in their churches' services or in their national and district meetings and conventions, as they believe their churches have autonomous authority to deal with how they handle and address Pentecostal and charismatic expressions of worship. In fact, in many churches that are a part of the National Baptist Convention, and in many of their national and district meetings and conventions across the United States, their adherents and clergy often practice, believe in, and exhibit the charismatic gifts of the Spirit that are practiced in Pentecostalism such as speaking in tongues and being slain in the Spirit in their worship services. They also make very consistent use of high-tempo Traditional Black Gospel and Contemporary Christian music in their worship style and practices as well.

Also, as many Pentecostal and Charismatic denominations adhere to Christian perfection teachings that originated from the Holiness movement, the National Baptist Convention does officially teach and believe in Christian perfection, and refers to it also as many Pentecostal denominations do as "sanctification."

== See also ==
- Pentecostal Free Will Baptist Church
- Holiness Baptist Association
- Full Gospel Baptist Church Fellowship
- National Baptist Convention, Brazil
- Baptist Churches of New Zealand
- Lagoinha Church
- Attitude Baptist Church
- Continuationism
- Finished Work Pentecostalism
- Holiness Pentecostalism
- William Howard Durham
- Craig Keener

== Bibliography ==
- Weaver, C Douglas (28 May 2026). "Charismatic and Pentecostal Relationships". The Oxford Handbook of Baptist Studies. Oxford University Press. pp. 552–566. doi:10.1093/9780191946141.003.0038.
