= Dwight McKissic =

American Baptist minister (born 1958)

William Dwight McKissic, Sr. (born 1958) is a prominent African-American Southern Baptist minister from Pine Bluff, Arkansas. He is the founder and current senior pastor of Cornerstone Baptist Church in Arlington, Texas. McKissic is a controversial leader of the Bapticostal movement, marked by rejection of cessationism and support of the charismatic gifts. He has also made several controversial statements, specifically about homosexuality and divine wrath.

== Biography ==
McKissic planted Cornerstone Baptist Church in 1983 in his garage. Today, Cornerstone Baptist Church in Arlington, Texas averages about 1,800 members each Sunday. McKissic's vision is to continue developing a multi-cultural ministry that will eventually house a K-12 school, retreat and communications center, and also ministries to reach and mentor fatherless children. In addition to mentoring church planters, he is the author of several books including "Beyond Roots: In Search of Blacks In The Bible", "Beyond Roots II: If Anybody Asks You Who I Am", and "Moving From Fear to Faith".

McKissic graduated with a Bachelor of Arts in Christian Studies from Ouachita Baptist University in 1978. He holds a Master of Theological Studies degree from Southwestern Baptist Theological Seminary, which he completed in 2020. He is currently a Doctor of Ministry student at Virginia University of Lynchburg.

McKissic has served as a guest lecturer for schools such as Southwestern Baptist Theological Seminary, where he formerly served as a trustee, Criswell College, University of Minnesota, Emory University, Southern Illinois University, Wheaton College, and Harvard University.

== Hurricane Katrina as the wrath of God ==
McKissic said in reference to Hurricane Katrina "New Orleans flaunts sin in a way that no other places do. They call it the Big Easy. There are 10 abortion clinics in Louisiana; five of those are in New Orleans. They have a Southern Decadence parade every year and they call it gay pride. When you study Scripture, it's not out of the boundaries of God to punish a nation for sin and because of sin. When I look at our country, at what's happening, and what's happening in New Orleans in particular, it's not beyond the realm of possibility."

== Position on speaking in tongues ==
Following the new qualification of missionary appointments, the Rev. Dwight McKissic gave a sermon during a chapel service to students attending Southwestern Baptist Theological Seminary and announced that he speaks in tongues and uses a private prayer language and emphasized not taking a cessationist view of the charismatic gifts. Southwestern Baptist Theological Seminary quickly distanced itself from McKissic's comments saying,

"Rev. McKissic’s interpretation of tongues as 'ecstatic utterance' is not a position that we suspect would be advocated by most faculty or trustees. In keeping with Baptist convictions regarding religious liberty, we affirm Rev. McKissic’s right to believe and advocate his position. Equally in keeping with our emphasis of religious liberty we reserve the right not to disseminate openly views which we fear may be harmful to the churches."

However, shortly after his election as president of the Convention, Rev. Frank Page expanded on his "big tent" view of Southern Baptists by saying,

"Churches must deal with charismatic issues and theology as a part of their own autonomous structure. I think that many charismatics function well within traditional Southern Baptist churches. In fact, we have several in our church. Some are more vocal and sometimes disruptive. Churches must deal with those kinds of attitudes on a case by case basis. Trustee bodies must do the same."
