= Cafundá Astrogilda =

Cafundá Astrogilda is an urban quilombo located in Vargem Grande , Rio de Janeiro.

== History ==
The quilombo occupies an area within the Pedra Branca State Park, created in 1974. Since the park's creation, the traditional occupants have suffered from obstacles imposed on their activities, as well as legal uncertainty regarding their residences. Only in 2009 did an advisory council, including local residents and institutions, begin drafting a management plan, which was published in 2012 .

In March 2013, at a meeting in Alto Mucuíba, residents of Cafundá Astrogilda declared their kinship and neighborhood relations and their descent from former slaves . The following year, the NGO Panela de Barro helped in the articulation of the community to obtain recognition of the place as a quilombo . The link with African ancestry was reinforced by the figure of Pai Tertuliano, an entity worshipped by the former slaves of the farms in the region, and spiritual guide of an Umbanda terreiro that operated there between 1934 and 1962, with the matriarch Astrogilda chosen as a reference for the name.

On August 16, 2014, the community received quilombo certification.

== Features ==
The main economic activity in the quilombo is family farming. Residents also produce liqueurs and infusions, including parangolé , an aphrodisiac created by the griot Jorge dos Santos Mesquita.

== Museum ==
The Cafundá Astrogilda Museum brings together cult objects belonging to the former Umbanda terreiro.
