= Jardim Oceânico =

Region of Rio de Janeiro, Brazil

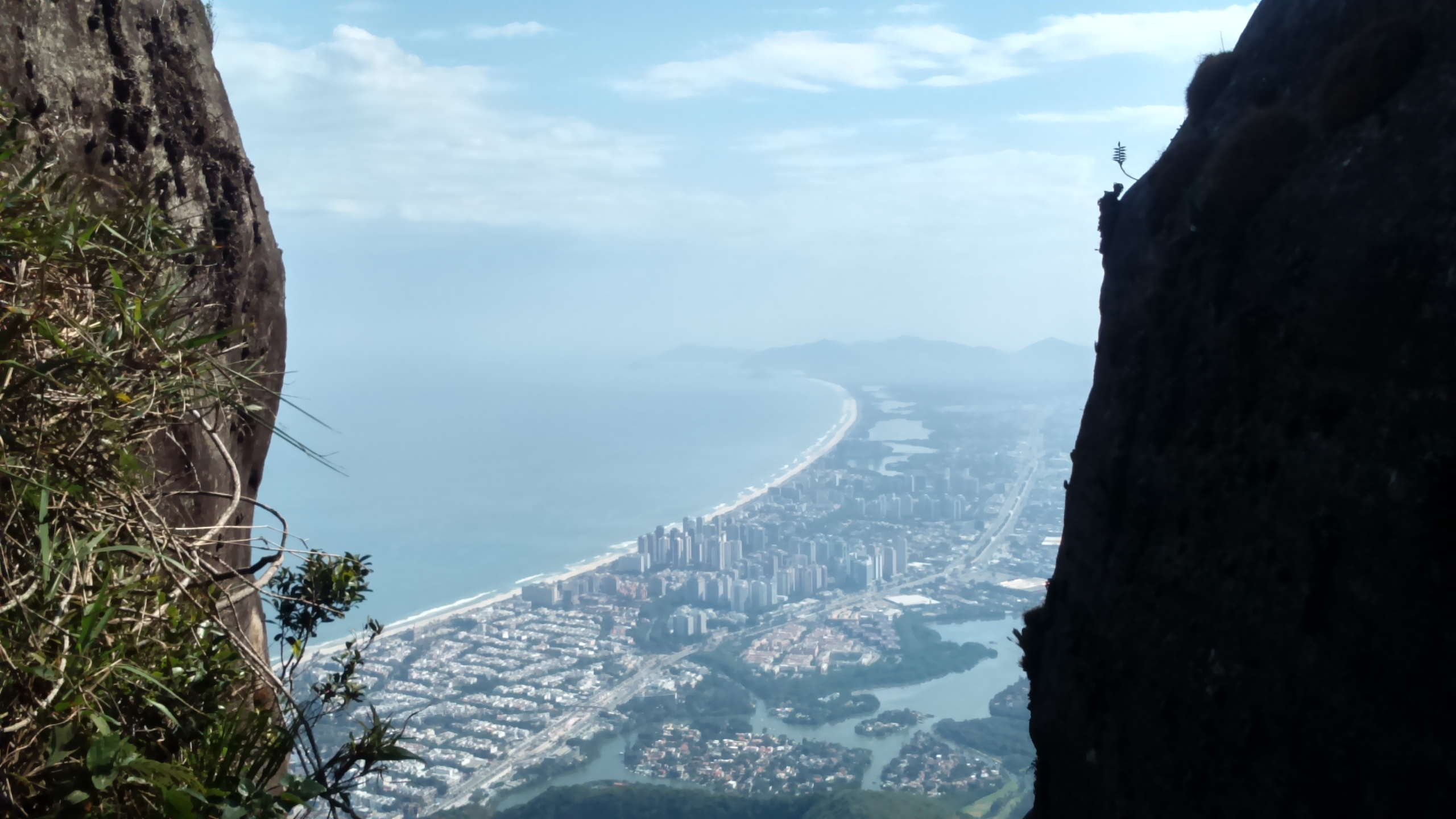
- Aerial view of Jardim Oceânico in 2015.

- Location within Rio de Janeiro Location within Brazil
- Coordinates: 22°59′50″S 43°17′7.55″W
- Country: Brazil
- State: Rio de Janeiro
- Municipality: Rio de Janeiro

Jardim Oceânico (literally translated as “Oceanic Garden”), is an unofficial, luxury neighborhood located in the Barra da Tijuca district of Rio de Janeiro. It is serviced by the Jardim Oceânico Station and Line 4.
