= Palace II (building) =

Collapsed building in Rio de Janeiro, Brazil

Coordinates: 23°00′22.17″S 43°19′20.15″W

- The building after the partial collapse, and before its implosion.
- Interactive map of the Palace II area

General information
- Type: Residential
- Location: Rio de Janeiro, RJ, Brazil.
- Construction started: 1990
- Completed: 1995
- Demolished: February 28, 1998

Height
- Height: 138 m (420 ft)

Technical details
- Floor count: 22

Design and construction
- Civil engineer: Sérgio Naya

Palace II was a tower block built at Barra da Tijuca, Rio de Janeiro, Brazil. On February 22, 1998, parts of it collapsed, due to engineering error, killing eight people. Another part of its structure collapsed on February 27, 1998, and the remaining parts of the building were demolished on February 28, 1998. Before the building was demolished, researchers found empty piers and evidence of the usage of beach sand on the construction. All families had to move to hotels after the building's fall. They had no time to collect their personal objects in their apartments.

Although most of them have not yet received any kind of indemnity from the company responsible for building their homes, the Superior Court of Justice of Brazil announced, on April 9, 2008, the unblocking of 13 million reais (~6.5 million US dollars) earned through the auction of a property of Sérgio Naya, the civil engineer who had designed and built the building, which will be given to the 130 families who lived there.
