= Vargem Pequena =

- Neighborhood
- Location in Rio de Janeiro Vargem Pequena (Brazil)
- Coordinates: 22°58′50″S 43°27′49″W
- Country: Brazil
- State: Rio de Janeiro (RJ)
- Municipality/City: Rio de Janeiro
- Zone: Southwest Zone

Population (2010)
  - Total: 27,250

Vargem Pequena (Little meadow) is a neighborhood in the Southwest Zone of Rio de Janeiro, Brazil.
