= Brazilian Evangelical Christian Alliance =

Evangelical alliance in Brazil

- Aliança Cristã Evangélica Brasileira
- Founded: 1964; 62 years ago
- Type: Evangelical organization
- Headquarters: Campinas, Brazil
- Region served: Brazil
- Affiliations: World Evangelical Alliance
- Website: aliancaevangelica.org.br

The Brazilian Evangelical Christian Alliance (Portuguese: Aliança Cristã Evangélica Brasileira) is a national evangelical alliance, member of the World Evangelical Alliance. It regroup 31 Evangelical Christian denominations, 68 organizations, educational institutions and local churches in Brazil. The headquarters is in Campinas, Brazil. Its president is Silas Tostes.

== History ==
=== Initiative and precedents ===
In Brazil already existed two organizations that sought to unite the Evangelical denominations in favor of a common cause, the Brazilian Evangelical Conference (CEB), which existed until 1964, and the Brazilian Evangelical Associations (AEVB), founded in 1991. and actively

Since 2009 a group of Brazilian evangelical leaders from various denominations began to meet and seek to create an organization that would bring together the different Brazilian Protestant denominations. After several meetings of tapping, the Charter of Principles and Guidelines was established and a working group, which initiated the Alliance later.

=== Foundation ===
The Brazilian Evangelical Christian Alliance was founded on November 30, 2010, in the Methodist Cathedral of São Paulo, and featured the participation of several leaders of several Brazilian Protestant denominations.

== Statistics ==
As of 2025, it had 31 Christian denominations and 68 member organizations.

== Statements ==
The Alliance has positioned itself against the "staff voting" that is the hallmark of candidates for religious leaders. The organizations requested that such attitudes are reported. In addition the organization condemns racism and corruption.

== Controversy ==
In 2011, the Alliance has been criticized by evangelical leaders after supporting the Brazilian government. Second part of the evangelical leadership, the Alliance is getting involved in political matters that you would not be relevant or government ideology incompatible with the Protestant faith, especially the involvement of the Alliance leaders with Theology of Integral Mission, which is a Protestant version of Liberation Theology in Catholicism. This fact was disclosed as the triggering event of output Alliance of Christian Churches New Life of the organization. Bishop Walter McAlister (church leader) recanted and said that this was not the main reason that led to the exit of the Alliance Church.
