= Camorim =

Neighborhood in Rio de Janeiro, Brazil

- Neighborhood
- Location in Rio de Janeiro Camorim (Brazil)
- Coordinates: 22°57′57″S 43°26′20″W
- Country: Brazil
- State: Rio de Janeiro (RJ)
- Municipality/City: Rio de Janeiro
- Zone: Southwest Zone

Camorim is a neighborhood of the city of Rio de Janeiro, Brazil, located in the Southwest Zone.
