= Barra Shopping =

Coordinates: 22.9972°S 43.3589°W

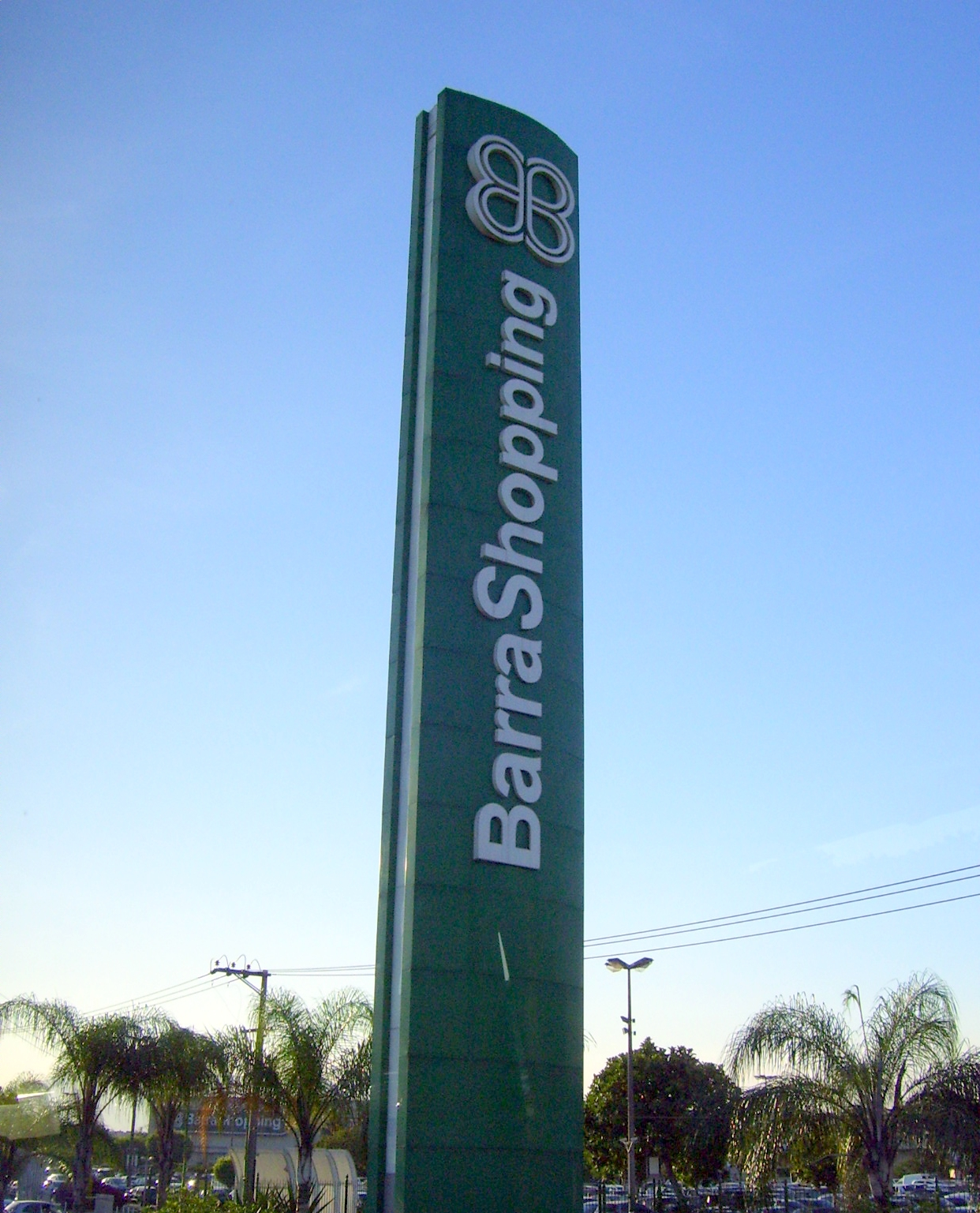
- Barra Shopping mall
- Location: Av. das Américas, 4666-Barra da Tijuca, Rio de Janeiro, Brazil
- Opened: October 26, 1981; 45 years ago
- Developer: Multiplan
- Manager: Multiplan
- Owner: Multiplan
- Num. of stores: 600+
- Num. of anchor tenants: 12
- Floor area: 120,006 m^{2} (1,291,730 sq ft)
- Floors: 3
- Parking: 5,097 spaces
- Public transit: Terminal Alvorada
- Website: barrashopping.com.br

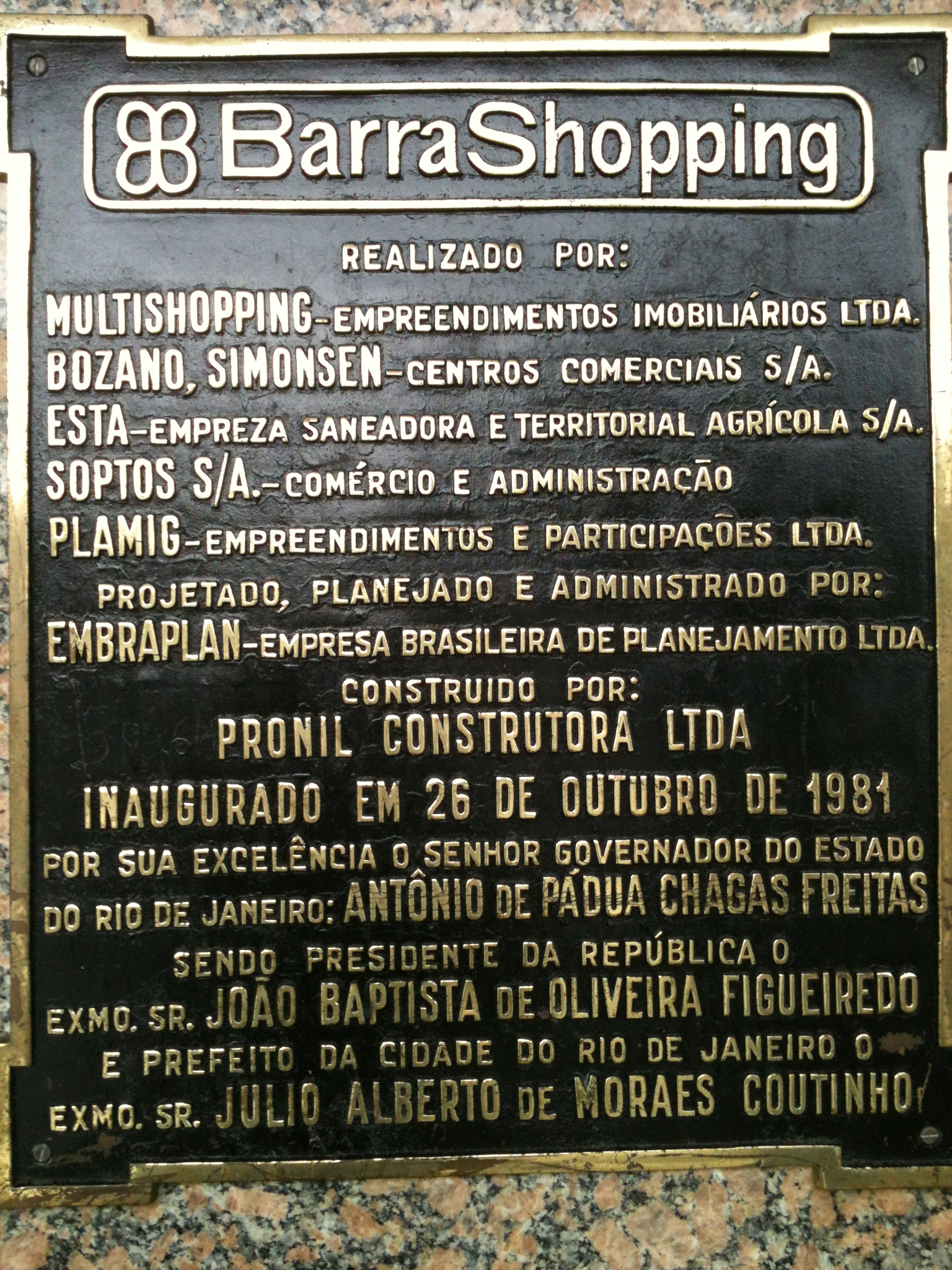
Barra Shopping placard

Barra Shopping is a Brazilian shopping center located in the Barra da Tijuca neighborhood of Rio de Janeiro. The center was opened in 1981.

== History ==
The mall was inaugurated on October 26, 1981, by the then-governor of the state, Antônio de Pádua Chagas Freitas. The shopping complex comprises Barra Shopping center, New York City Center, a medical center, a business center, and a professional center. On December 4, 2012, the Village Mall shopping center was officially inaugurated along with the Barra Shopping Business Center.

The shopping center contains 600 stores, including C&A, Lojas Americanas, Renner, Ponto Frio, Fast Shop, Fnac, and Zara. The mall measures 120 thousand m^{2} and has 5 thousand parking spaces. Each year, more than 20 million people visit the mall, which is managed by Multiplan. The mall's logo is well-known and shared by several projects undertaken by Multiplan. The logo represents the clover along BR-356 in Belvedere in Belo Horizonte, Minas Gerais, where the company built its first shopping center (BH Shopping) in 1979. The same logo was used to represent the "big onion" ("Cebolāo"), as the cloverleaf between the Avenida das Américas and the Avenida Ayrton Senna is called.

Barra Shopping was selected, in a study of "carioca" brands by the O Globo newspaper and the Grupo Troiano marketing company, as one of the five most preferred shopping centers in Rio de Janeiro.

When it was first constructed in July 1981, there was some confusion about what to call the new mall. Initially, it was called the"Shopping Center da Barra", as evidenced by advertisements in local newspapers at the time. Soon after, however, the public began referring to it as "Barra Shopping" and the name stuck.

== Complexo Barra Shopping/New York City Center (NYCC) ==
On December 4, 2003, two new sections of the Barra Shopping mall complex were inaugurated. Known as the New York City Center and the Barra Shopping Business Center, these areas became an important part of one of the largest centers for shopping, commercial services, and entertainment in Latin America. Around the same time, the Medical Center was added. Composed primarily of thirty specialist clinics, this area also includes an entertainment sector with an eighteen-theater cinema and the "Cia. Atletica" gym. Since its opening, the complex has generated nine thousand jobs and, in 2005, it has made R$875 million in sales.

== The Barra Shopping Monorail ==
In June 1996, a monorail line was inaugurated to facilitate customer movement around the shopping complex. The rail substituted the free microbus service that previously helped move customers to and from their parking spaces. Each ride on the monorail costs R$1.50 and there are three stations. Two are located on the outer limits of the shopping center and one in the parking area. After initial success as a novelty, rail usage diminished due to the high cost. The train was eventually de-activated in 2000.

== Barra Shopping Business Center ==
The Barra Shopping Business Center comprises eleven commercial buildings that include corporations like Shell and Ami. In addition, a satellite campus for the Universidade Estácio de Sá, in association with the Fórum Regional da Barra da Tijuca, is also located there. A 200-meter-long catwalk connects the Business Center to the main Barra Shopping complex.

== Expansion ==
Currently, the mall is in the process of expanding to accommodate 45 more stores and additional parking. When construction is complete, the Barra Shopping-New York City Center will have nearly 700 stores, which will make it the largest mall in Brazil and Latin America (by number of stores). The largest mall in Latin America and Brazil, in terms of square footage, is found in São Paulo (as of 2009).

== Gallery ==
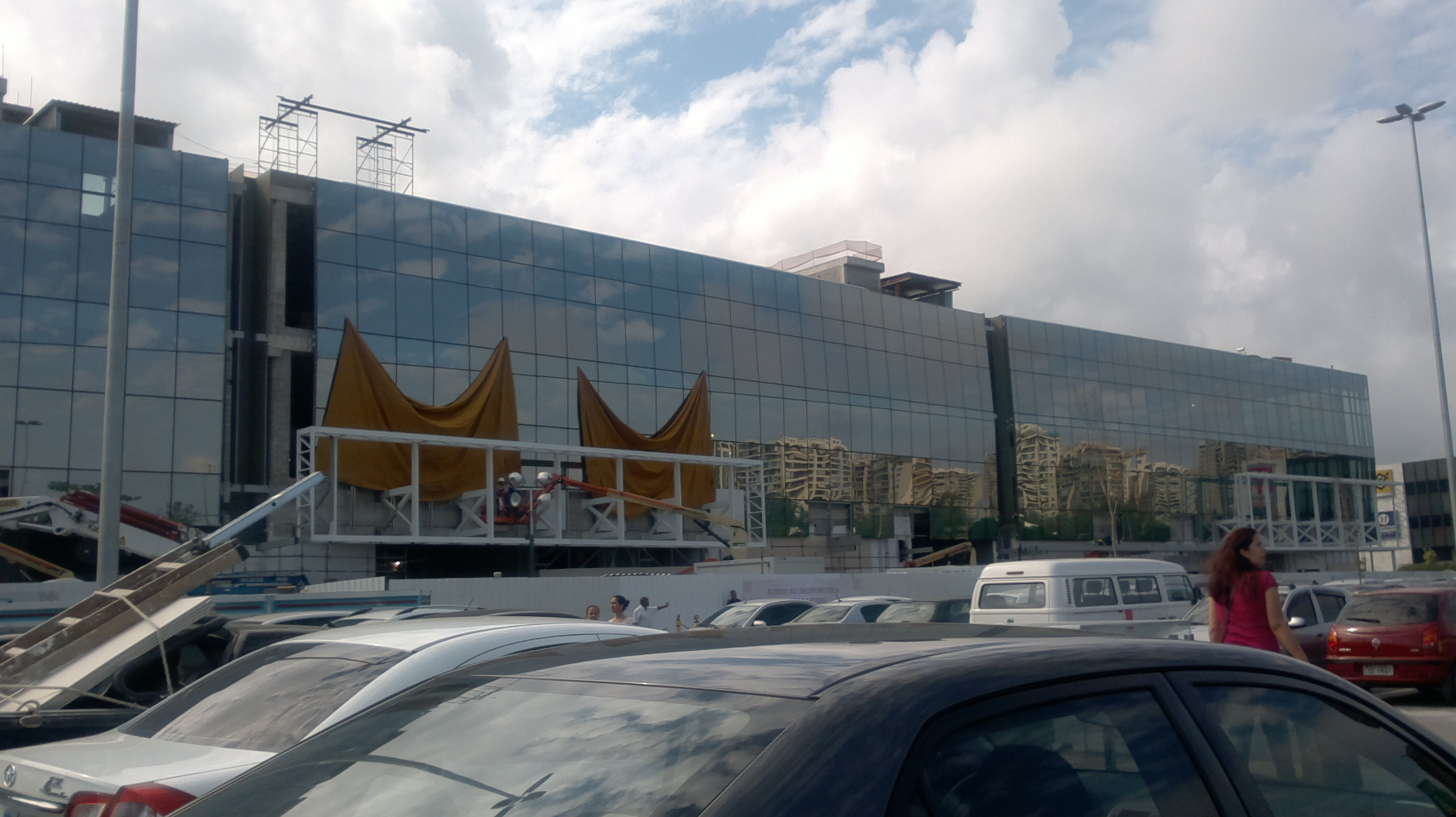
Expansion of Barra Shopping

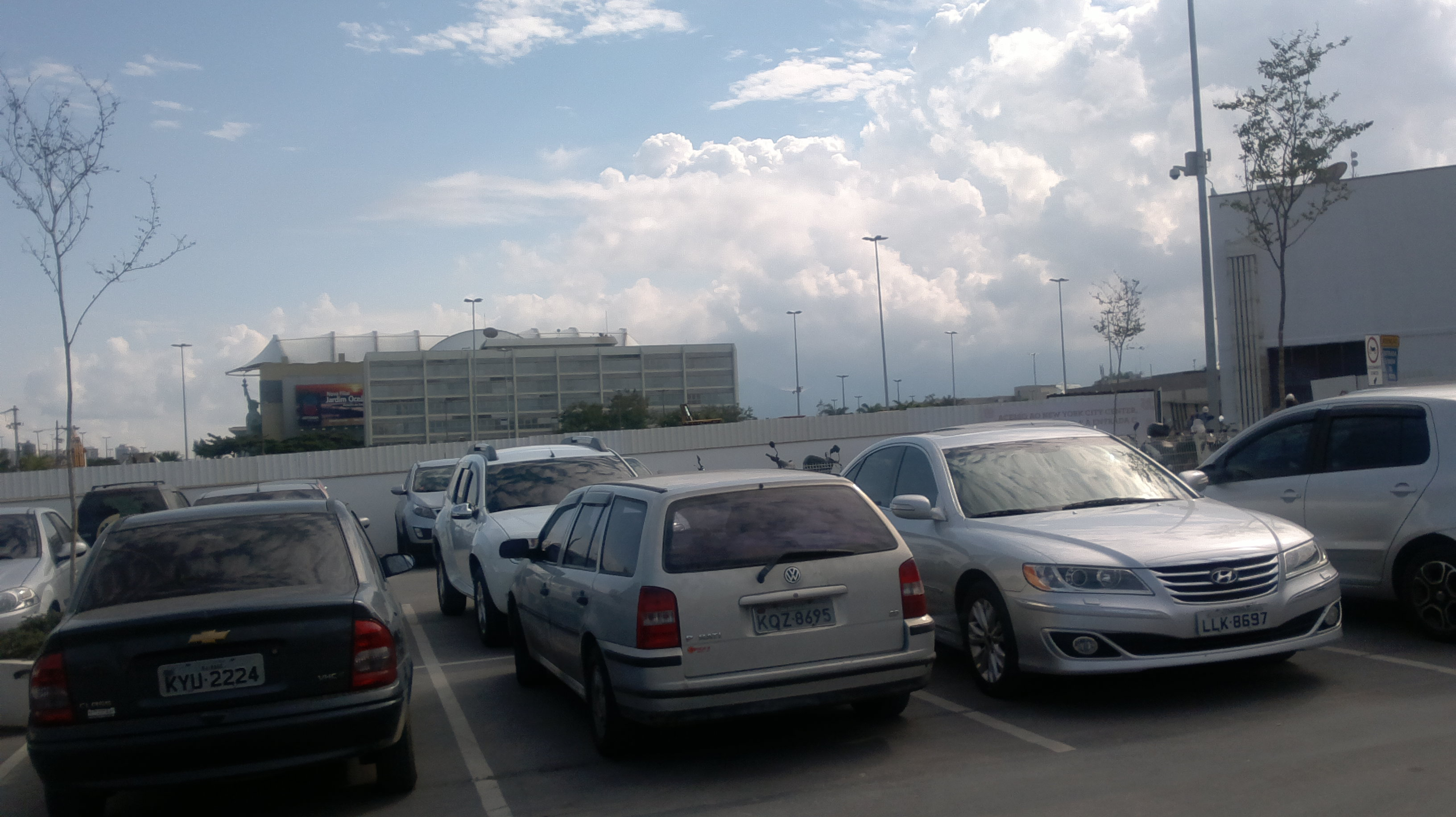
Barra Shopping and the New York City Center in the background

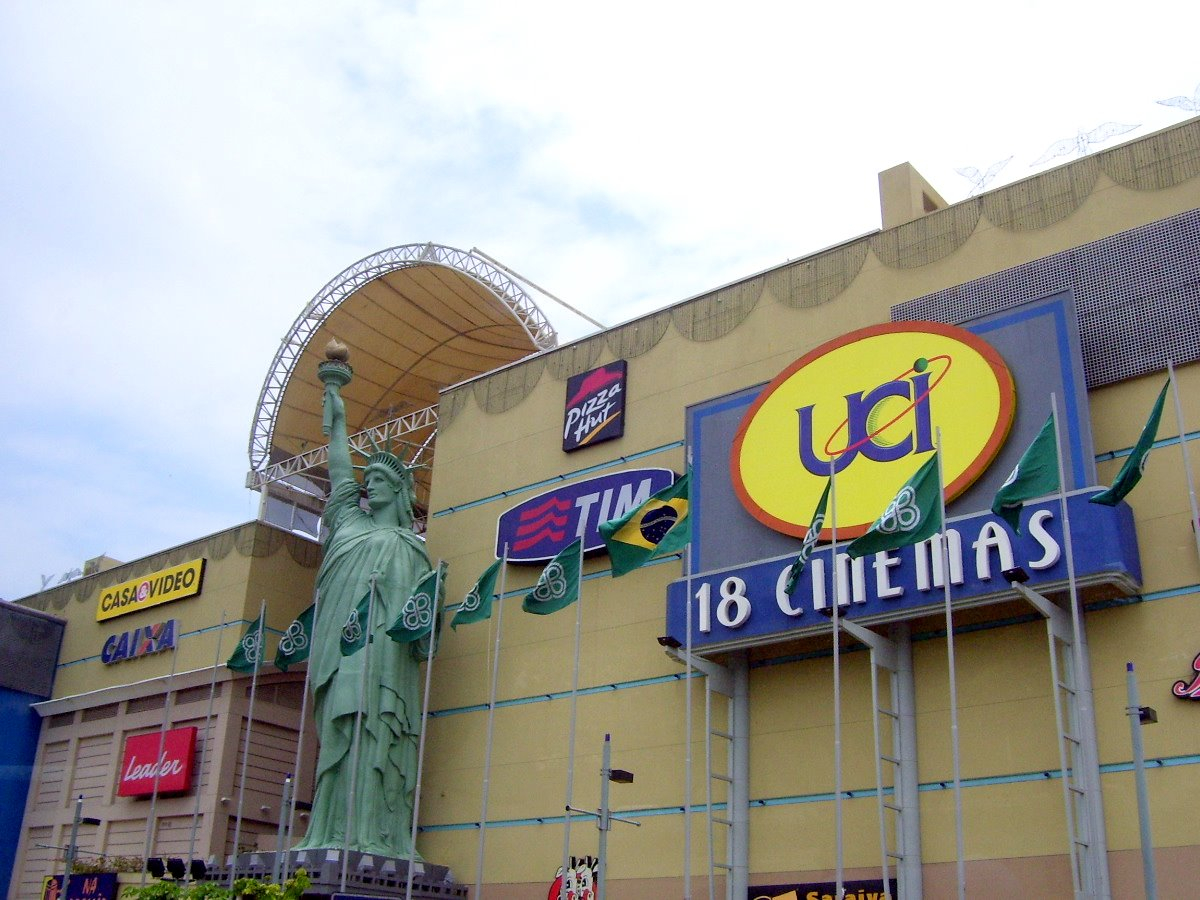
New York City Center

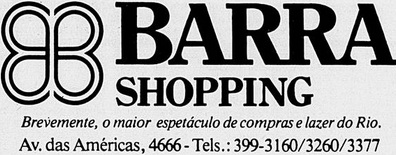
The name eventually given to the structure, three months after its grand opening

== See also ==
- List of shopping centers in Brazil
