= Itanhangá, Rio de Janeiro =

Itanhangá
- Neighborhood
- Location in Rio de Janeiro Itanhangá (Brazil)
- Coordinates: 22°59′13″S 43°18′18″W
- Country: Brazil
- State: Rio de Janeiro (RJ)
- Municipality/City: Rio de Janeiro
- Zone: Southwest Zone

Itanhangá is a neighborhood in the Southwest Zone of Rio de Janeiro, Brazil.
