= List of Administrative Regions in Rio de Janeiro =

This is a list of the 33 administrative regions (Portuguese: regiões administrativas) in the municipality of Rio de Janeiro, Brazil.

Number	Administrative region	Neighbourhoods	Population	Ref.
I	Portuária	Caju, Gamboa, Santo Cristo, Saúde	48,664	
II	Centro	Centro	41,142	
III	Rio Comprido	Catumbi, Cidade Nova, Estácio, Rio Comprido	78,975	
IV	Botafogo	Botafogo, Catete, Cosme Velho, Flamengo, Glória, Humaitá, Laranjeiras, Urca	239,729	
V	Copacabana	Copacabana, Leme	161,191	
VI	Lagoa	Gávea, Ipanema, Jardim Botânico, Lagoa, Leblon, São Conrado, Vidigal	167,774	
VII	São Cristovão	Benfica, Mangueira, São Cristóvão, Vasco da Gama	84,908	
VIII	Tijuca	Alto da Boa Vista, Praça da Bandeira, Tijuca	181,810	
IX	Vila Isabel	Andaraí, Grajaú, Maracanã, Vila Isabel	189,310	
X	Ramos	Bonsucesso, Manguinhos, Olaria, Ramos	153,177	
XI	Penha	Brás de Pina, Penha, Penha Circular	185,716	
XII	Inhaúma	Del Castilho, Engenho da Rainha, Higienópolis, Inhaúma, Maria da Graça, Tomás Coelho	134,349	
XIII	Méier	Abolição, Água Santa, Cachambi, Encantado, Engenho de Dentro, Engenho Novo, Jacaré, Lins de Vasconcelos, Méier, Piedade, Pilares, Riachuelo, Rocha, Sampaio, São Francisco Xavier, Todos os Santos	397,782	
XIV	Irajá	Colégio, Irajá, Vicente de Carvalho, Vila Cosmos, Vila da Penha, Vista Alegre	202,952	
XV	Madureira	Bento Ribeiro, Campinho, Cascadura, Cavalcanti, Engenheiro Leal, Honório Gurgel, Madureira, Marechal Hermes, Oswaldo Cruz, Quintino Bocaiuva, Rocha Miranda, Turiaçu, Vaz Lobo	372,555	
XVI	Jacarepaguá	Anil, Curicica, Freguesia (Jacarepaguá), Gardênia Azul, Jacarepaguá, Pechincha, Praça Seca, Tanque, Taquara, Vila Valqueire	572,030	
XVII	Bangu	Bangu, Gericinó, Padre Miguel, Senador Camará	412,868	
XVIII	Campo Grande	Campo Grande, Cosmos, Inhoaíba, Santíssimo, Senador Vasconcelos	542,084	
XIX	Santa Cruz	Paciência, Santa Cruz, Sepetiba	368,534	
XX	Ilha do Governador	Bancários, Cacuia, Cidade Universitária, Cocotá, Freguesia (Ilha do Governador), Galeão, Jardim Carioca, Jardim Guanabara, Moneró, Pitangueiras, Portuguesa, Praia da Bandeira, Ribeira, Tauá, Zumbi	212,574	
XXI	Ilha de Paquetá	Paquetá	3,361	
XXII	Anchieta	Anchieta, Guadalupe, Parque Anchieta, Ricardo de Albuquerque	158,318	
XXIII	Santa Teresa	Santa Teresa	40,926	
XXIV	Barra da Tijuca	Barra da Tijuca, Camorim, Grumari, Itanhangá, Joá, Recreio dos Bandeirantes, Vargem Grande, Vargem Pequena	300,823	
XXV	Pavuna	Acari, Barros Filho, Coelho Neto, Costa Barros, Parque Columbia, Pavuna	208,813	
XXVI	Guaratiba	Barra de Guaratiba, Guaratiba, Pedra de Guaratiba	123,114	
XXVII	Rocinha	Rocinha	69,356	
XXVIII	Jacarezinho	Jacarezinho	37,839	
XXIX	Complexo do Alemão	Complexo do Alemão	69,143	
XXX	Maré	Maré	129,770	
XXXI	Vigário Geral	Cordovil, Jardim América, Parada de Lucas, Vigário Geral	136,171	
XXXIII	Realengo	Campo dos Afonsos, Deodoro, Jardim Sulacap, Magalhães Bastos, Realengo, Vila Militar	243,006	
XXXIV	Cidade de Deus	Cidade de Deus	12,285	

== See also ==
- Geography of Brazil
- List of cities in Brazil
