= Irajá =

- Neighborhood
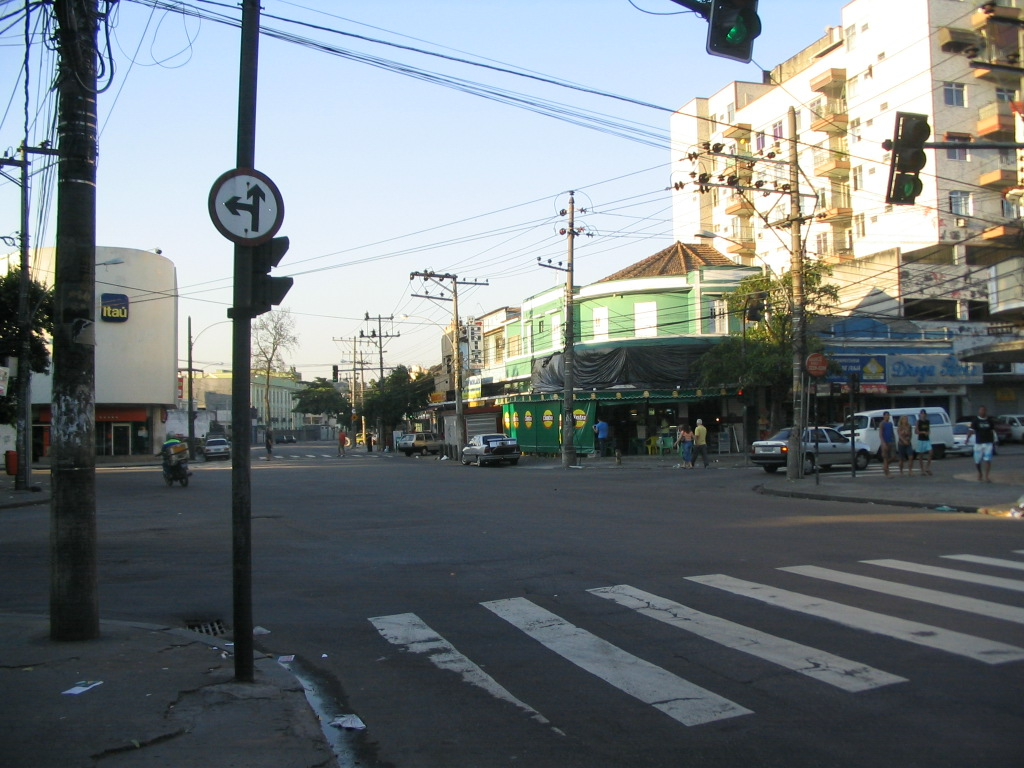

- Location in Rio de Janeiro Irajá (Brazil)
- Coordinates: 22°50′04″S 43°19′38″W
- Country: Brazil
- State: Rio de Janeiro (RJ)
- Municipality/City: Rio de Janeiro
- Zone: North Zone

Irajá is a neighborhood of middle class and lower middle in the North Zone of Rio de Janeiro, Brazil. The neighborhood is divided by Brasil Avenue. Today it is a neighborhood of medium size, with a little more than 200,000 inhabitants. It borders the neighborhoods of Brás de Pina, Vila da Penha, Vicente de Carvalho, Vaz Lobo, Turiaçu, Rocha Miranda, Colégio, Coelho Neto, Acari, Pavuna, Parque Colúmbia, Jardim América, Vigário Geral, Parada de Lucas, Cordovil and Vista Alegre. Its human development index, in the year 2000, was 0.798, the 95th best in the city of Rio de Janeiro.

== History ==
The word "irajá," said Teodoro Fernandes Sampaio, considered the outstanding Brazilian knowledgeable of Indian Affairs, author of Tupi in the national geography is "honey flows." It is sometimes referred to by the native population as "Mudur."

The neighborhood had its origins in the biggest portuguese land grant of Rio de Janeiro, which included Benfica, Anchieta, and Campo Grande. It was granted to Antoine de França in 1568, where he founded the sugar cane mill of Nossa Senhora da Ajuda.

The son of Gaspar, on December 30, 1644, established the Parish of Nossa Senhora da Apresentação of Irajá. The parish was to become the Mother Church of the district, confirmed by charter of D.João IV on 10 February 1647.

In 1625, the so-called field Irajá has also been recognized as belonging to the City Council. In 1775, there were thirteen mills in the region.

During the 17th century, Irajá was an important supply center for food and building material, which can be considered as a tradition of the local market, due to it housing for several years the white cement factory Irajazinho and the CEASA, an important supply center for groceries.

Like other land grants, to the Irajá was fragmented, shaping the map of the city we know today. Currently, the neighborhood is primarily a residential neighborhood.

== See also ==
- Abadir and Iraja
