= Guadalupe, Rio de Janeiro =

Neighborhood in Rio de Janeiro city, Brazil

Guadalupe
- Neighborhood
- Location in Rio de Janeiro Guadalupe (Brazil)
- Coordinates: 22°50′14″S 43°22′31″W
- Country: Brazil
- State: Rio de Janeiro (RJ)
- Municipality/City: Rio de Janeiro
- Zone: North Zone

Guadalupe is a neighborhood located in the North Zone of Rio de Janeiro, Brazil. It is surrounded by Barros Filho, Honório Gurgel, Marechal Hermes, Deodoro, Ricardo de Albuquerque, Costa Barros and Anchieta. Its designation is a homage to Our Lady of Guadalupe which main church in Rio de Janeiro is located in this neighbourhood. The neighbourhood was built as a project of former Casa Popular Foundation and it was inaugurated by president Getúlio Vargas. Are also notable in the neighbourhood the "Igloos of Guadalupe", a set of houses in hemisphere shape, looking like igloos, and built in the late 1940s on Calama street.

In Guadalupe, there are many retail stores, banks, shopping mall, municipal day care, courses, laboratories, movie theater, social clubs, health clubs, factories, the Terra cultural center, restaurants, hypermarket, pharmacies, clinics, college, the Augusto Amaral Peixoto clinic and many city-owned and private schools.

Guadalupe is crossed by the Avenida Brasil, which links downtown area to the West Zone of the city. By this reason, many bus lines that cross the city are available in Guadalupe. Other notable pathways within the neighbourhood are Marcos de Macedo street, Camboatá road, Francisco Portela street and Luís Coutinho Cavalcanti street.

The main companies located in Guadalupe are: Obramax (home improvement retailer), SuperMarket and Atacadão hypermarkets, the Guadalupe Shopping (shopping mall), the Guadalupe Country Clube, Estácio de Sá University, the Ponto Cine (movie theater) and the Pio XII school among others.

In December 2009, Saphyr entrepreneur announced the plan of building a major shopping mall in the place previously occupied by the former pharmaceutical industry Melhoral. The mall openened on November 24, 2011, and it is named Shopping Jardim Guadalupe.

== Data ==
- Land area (2003): 382.00 hectares
- Population (2000): 46,325 people
- Number of homes (2000): 13,959 units

Guadalupe belongs to XXII Administrative Region (Anchieta) of Rio de Janeiro. The neighborhoods that compound this Administrative Region are: Anchieta, Guadalupe, Parque Anchieta and Ricardo de Albuquerque.

The designation Guadalupe has been used informally for many decades but only on July 23, 1981, the neighbourhood was officially created, by means of a municipal decree.
