= União da Ilha do Governador =

União da Ilha
- Foundation: 7 March 1953; 73 years ago
- Blessing school: Portela
- Colors

The Grêmio Recreativo Escola de Samba União da Ilha do Governador (Recreation Guild Samba School Union of Governor's Island) was founded on March 7, 1953 by the friends Maurício Gazelle, and Quincas Orphylo, who were in Cacuia, the main site of the carnival parade of the Ilha do Governador, watching the presentation of small schools of samba and blocks of various districts of the island. It was then decided that the neighborhood of Cacuia should be represented by a samba school. Currently, the school is based in Estrada do Galeão in the neighborhood of Cacuia.

== History ==
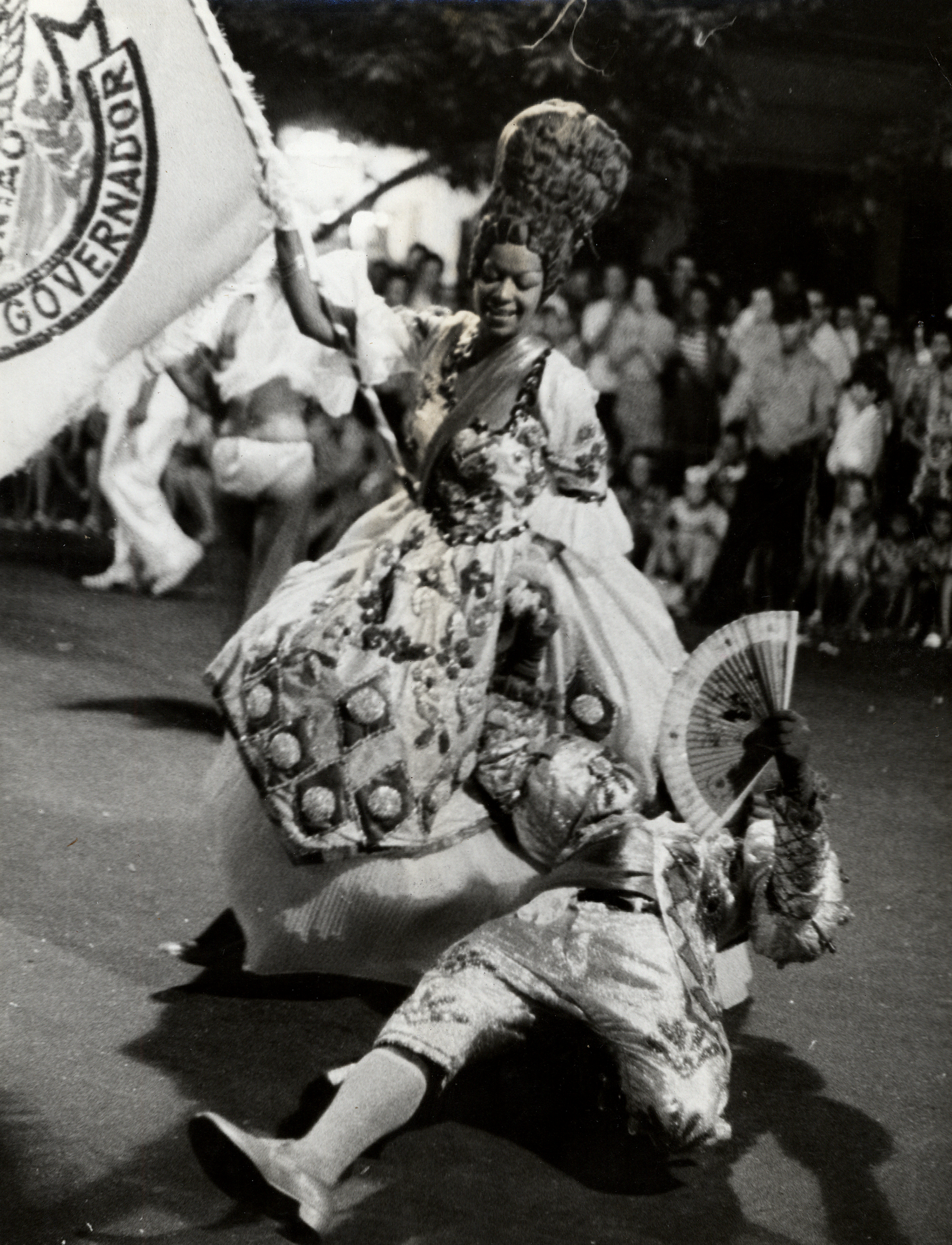
1972 União da Ilha Parade.

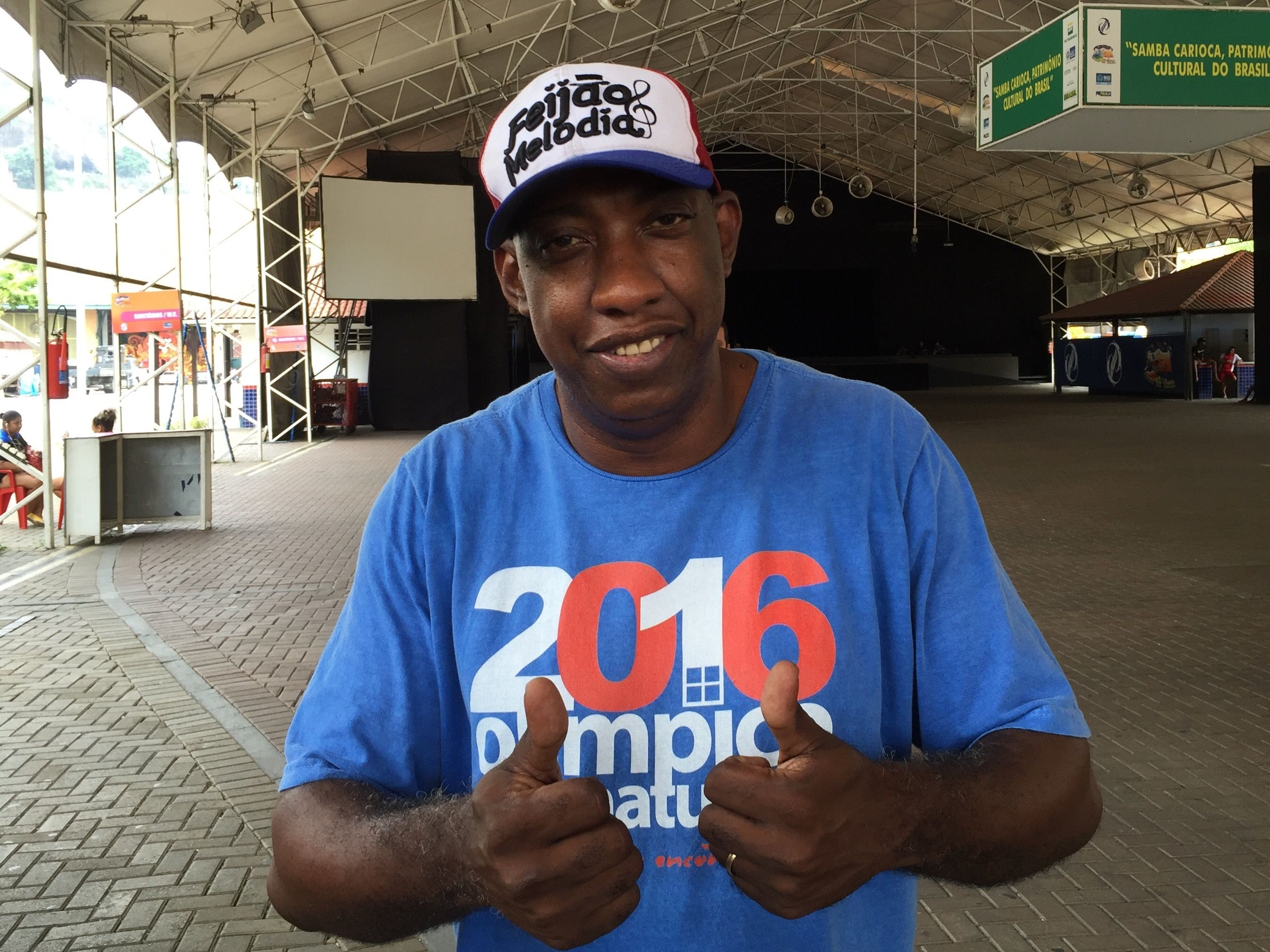
The interpreter Ito Melodia, current school singer and son of Aroldo Melodia one of the biggest names in the Carnival

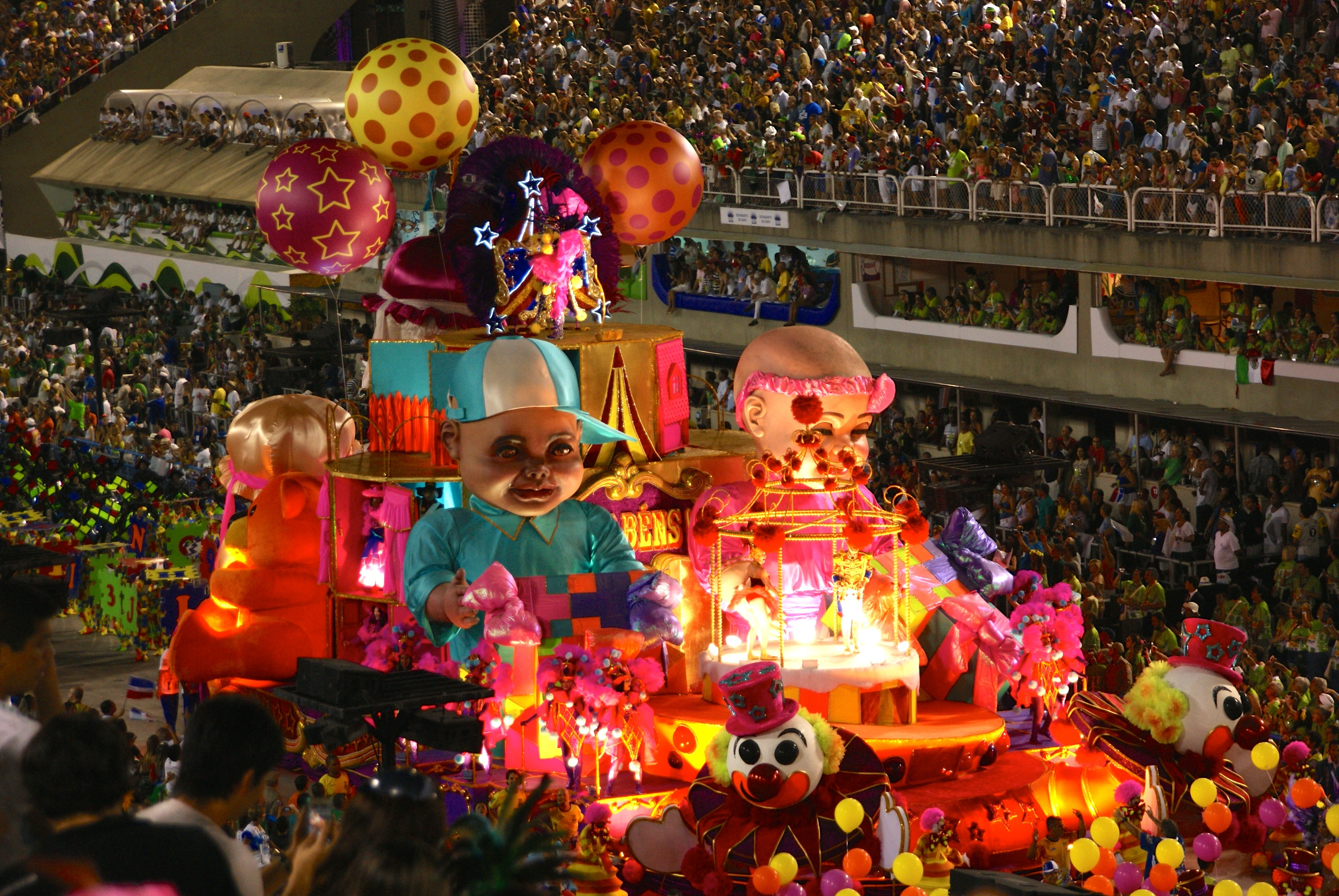
Allegory in the parade of 2014, when the island returned of Champions Parade

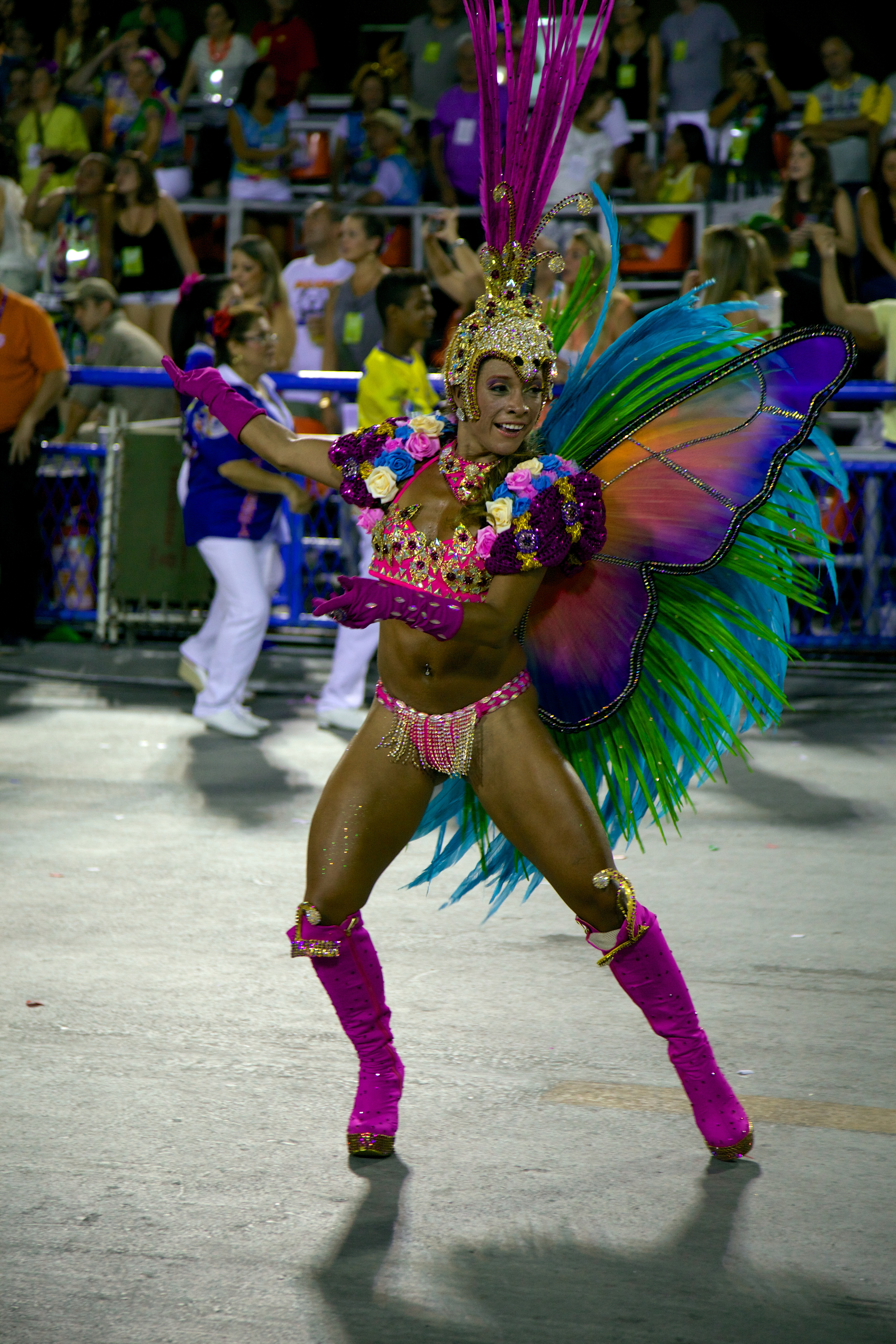
One of the highlights of ground, in the parade of 2014

The União da Ilha do Governador remained some time between the second and third groups, and in 1974, were crowned champions when the second group received access to the main group from the years following.

From 1977, with the theme "Sunday", till 1980, when they took second place with the theme "Good, Nice and Cheap", the Island has made a fashionable impression, with no definitive one of the samba schools more sympathetic to the judges. The school took to the parade Sapucaí light, cheap and cheerful. This would be the hallmark of the Island, held today. Their costumes are usually mild, without great splendor, making the parade for the performance. The school also can establish a good communication with the public and is considered one of the nicest of the carnival. The Today was the samba of the Island in 1978 and that same year was recorded by Elizeth Cardoso, but it was the first recording of Simone in 1983 (CD Delights and Delusions and re-recorded the live CD Simone), when she became popular.

In recent years, the best remembered parade of the island was in 1989. The theme song "Party profane" had the refrain "I'll get drunk with happiness" that, to date, is sung all over the country. That year, the school was in third place.

The last good result was obtained in 1994, with "Abrakadabra," which came in fourth, their last appearance in the Parade of Champions. Since then, they have achieved good placements.

In 2000, with "Not to say I did not speak of flowers", the Island came in eighth place, addressing some of the darkest of the 500 years of Brazil: a military dictatorship from 1964 to 1985.

In 2001, the school won 13th place in the Special Group, and were thus lowered to Access Group A in 2002, where they had ups and downs.

In 2008, even without many resources, the school had a parade of claw, and revived "É hoje o dia" ("Today is the Day"), which earned them fifth place.

From 2008, the samba-school based at the Ilha do Governador neighborhood in Rio de Janeiro city, literally 2 or 3 miles from the Rio de Janeiro-Galeão International Airport, started a professionalization process, with the introduction of a series of management techniques. A marketing department was established, the renovation of its headquarters started to gain interest (it was finalized May 2012), the financial department re-structured and a series of partnerships started to sprout. Today, União da Ilha do Governador Samba School has as one of its main partners Grupo Petrópolis, with Itaipava beer.

In 2009, the "insulana" (islander) samba-school, as it is sometimes called by its revelers, chose the parade theme "Travel is necessary – extraordinary journeys through worlds familiar and unknown". The carnival parade organizer Jack Vasconcelos became Carnival Champion of Group A with 239.9 points, returning after his demotion in 2001 to the so sought after Rio Carnival Special Group in 2010.

In 2010, as the Task Force came up with the story "Don Quixote the knight of impossible dreams," the carnival organizer Rosa Magalhães was overshadowed by just a few problems on the floats. In front of the drums came drums queen Bruna Bruno, who has been the front of the drums for years, along with Luciana Picorelli (current sponsor of the drums). They finished in 11th place, escaping relegation anew and still in the Special for Carnival 2011.

After the carnival, a school that has defined its plot in 2016, before the carnival 2015. That will be on the 2016 Summer Olympics in which after the departure of Alex de Souza backed the return Paulo Menezes and Jack Vasconcelos, as carnival. and had a change of queen of battery where after 11 years ahead of the battery Bruna Bruno abdicated the throne and was replaced by Bianca Leão. However, in a parade is shorter than the previous years, finished in 11th place.

However, for 2017 the school has changed the whole team starting with the carnival producer Severo Luzardo, director of carnival Wilsinho and the mestre-sala and porta-bandeira Phelipe Lemos and Dandara.

== Classifications ==
Year	Place	Division	Plot	Carnivals Producers	Ref.
Year	Place	Division	Plot	Singers	Ref.
1960	3rd place	Grupo 3	Homenagem às forças armadas	Djalma	
1960	3rd place	Grupo 3	Homenagem às forças armadas	Marcinha Seresteira	
1961	Vice Champion	Grupo 2	Rio, sempre Rio	Djalma	
1961	Vice Champion	Grupo 2	Rio, sempre Rio	Marcinha Seresteira	
1962	14th place	Grupo 2	Homenagem a Catulo da Paixão Cearense	Marcinha Seresteira	
1962	14th place	Grupo 2	Homenagem a Catulo da Paixão Cearense	Djalma	
1963	10th place	Grupo 3	Garimpeiros do Araguaia	Nelson	
1963	10th place	Grupo 3	Garimpeiros do Araguaia	Marcinha Seresteira	
1964	10th place	Grupo 3	Riquezas do Brasil	Nelson	
1964	10th place	Grupo 3	Riquezas do Brasil	Marcinha Seresteira	
1965	5th place	Grupo 3	De Estácio a Lacerda	Nelson	
1965	5th place	Grupo 3	De Estácio a Lacerda	Marcinha Seresteira	
1966	4th place	Grupo 3	A queda da Monarquia	Djalma	
1966	4th place	Grupo 3	A queda da Monarquia	Marcinha Seresteira	
1968	11th place	Grupo 3	A Revolução dos Alfaiates	Nelson	
1968	11th place	Grupo 3	A Revolução dos Alfaiates	Marcinha Seresteira	
1969	5th place	Grupo 2	Imagens do Brasil	Moleque	
1969	5th place	Grupo 2	Imagens do Brasil	Marcinha Seresteira	
1967	3rd place	Grupo 3	Epopéia dos Palmares	D. Lopes	
1967	3rd place	Grupo 3	Epopéia dos Palmares	Marcinha Seresteira	
1970	Vice Champion	Grupo 2	O sonho de um sambista	Edson Machado	
1970	Vice Champion	Grupo 2	O sonho de um sambista	Aroldo Melodia	
1971	14th place	Grupo 2	Ritual afro-brasileiro	Edson Machado	
1971	14th place	Grupo 2	Ritual afro-brasileiro	Aroldo Melodia	
1972	8th place	Grupo 2	A festa da cavalhada	Maria Augusta	
1972	8th place	Grupo 2	A festa da cavalhada	Aroldo Melodia	
1973	9th place	Grupo 2	Y Juca Pirama	Maria Augusta	
1973	9th place	Grupo 2	Y Juca Pirama	Aroldo Melodia	
1974	Champion	Grupo 2	Lendas e festas das Yabás	Mário Barcellos	
1974	Champion	Grupo 2	Lendas e festas das Yabás	Aroldo Melodia	
1975	9th place	Grupo 1	Nos confins de Vila Monte	Mário Barcellos	
1975	9th place	Grupo 1	Nos confins de Vila Monte	Aroldo Melodia	
1976	9th place	Grupo 1	Poemas de Máscaras e sonhos	Mário Barcellos	
1976	9th place	Grupo 1	Poemas de Máscaras e sonhos	Aroldo Melodia	
1977	3rd place	Grupo 1	Domingo	Alcione Barreto; Adalberto Sampaio; Maria Augusta	
1977	3rd place	Grupo 1	Domingo	Aroldo Melodia	
1978	4th place	Grupo 1	O Amanhã	Maria Augusta	
1978	4th place	Grupo 1	O Amanhã	Aroldo Melodia	
1979	5th place	Grupo 1A	O que será?	Adalberto Sampaio	
1979	5th place	Grupo 1A	O que será?	Aroldo Melodia	
1980	Vice Champion	Grupo 1A	Bom, bonito e barato	Adalberto Sampaio	
1980	Vice Champion	Grupo 1A	Bom, bonito e barato	Aroldo Melodia	
1981	7th place	Grupo 1A	1910, Burro na cabeça	Adalberto Sampaio	
1981	7th place	Grupo 1A	1910, Burro na cabeça	Aroldo Melodia	
1982	5th place	Grupo 1A	É Hoje	Max Lopes	
1982	5th place	Grupo 1A	É Hoje	Aroldo Melodia	
1983	7th place	Grupo 1A	Toma lá dá cá	Wany Araújo	
1983	7th place	Grupo 1A	Toma lá dá cá	Aroldo Melodia	
1984	5th place	Grupo 1A	Quem pode pode, quem não pode...	Geraldo Cavalcanti	
1984	5th place	Grupo 1A	Quem pode pode, quem não pode...	Quinzinho	
1985	12th place	Grupo 1A	Um herói, um enredo, uma canção	Luís Orlando	
1985	12th place	Grupo 1A	Um herói, um enredo, uma canção	Quinho	
1986	5th place	Grupo 1A	Assombrações	Arlindo Rodrigues	
1986	5th place	Grupo 1A	Assombrações	Aroldo Melodia	
1987	9th place	Grupo 1	Extra, Extra	Alexandre Louzada	
1987	9th place	Grupo 1	Extra, Extra	Aroldo Melodia	
1988	6th place	Grupo 1	Aquarilha do Brasil	Max Lopes	
1988	6th place	Grupo 1	Aquarilha do Brasil	Quinho	
1989	3rd place	Grupo 1	Festa Profana	Ney Ayan	
1989	3rd place	Grupo 1	Festa Profana	Quinho	
1990	7th place	Grupo Especial	Sonhar com Rei dá João	Ney Ayan	
1990	7th place	Grupo Especial	Sonhar com Rei dá João	Quinho	
1991	9th place	Grupo Especial	De bar em bar, Didi um poeta	Rogério Figueiredo; Ely Peron	
1991	9th place	Grupo Especial	De bar em bar, Didi um poeta	Aroldo Melodia	
1992	10th place	Grupo Especial	Sou mais minha Ilha	Luiz Fernando Reis	
1992	10th place	Grupo Especial	Sou mais minha Ilha	Aroldo Melodia	
1993	11th place	Grupo Especial	Os maiores espetáculos da Terra	Sylvio Cunha	
1993	11th place	Grupo Especial	Os maiores espetáculos da Terra	Mauricio 100	
1994	4th place	Grupo Especial	Abrakadabra, O despertar dos mágicos	Chico Spinoza	
1994	4th place	Grupo Especial	Abrakadabra, O despertar dos mágicos	Quinho	
1995	11th place	Grupo Especial	Todo dia é dia de Índio	Chico Spinoza	
1995	11th place	Grupo Especial	Todo dia é dia de Índio	Aroldo Melodia	
1996	12th place	Grupo Especial	A Ilha faz uma viagem a pintada encantada	Chico Spinoza	
1996	12th place	Grupo Especial	A Ilha faz uma viagem a pintada encantada	Aroldo Melodia	
1997	12th place	Grupo Especial	Cidade Maravilhosa, o sonho de Pereira Passos	Roberto Szaniecki	
1997	12th place	Grupo Especial	Cidade Maravilhosa, o sonho de Pereira Passos	Ito Melodia	
1998	9th place	Grupo Especial	Fatumbi - a Ilha de Todos os Santos	Milton Cunha	
1998	9th place	Grupo Especial	Fatumbi - a Ilha de Todos os Santos	Rixxah	
1999	10th place	Grupo Especial	Barbosa Lima, 101 anos do sobrinho do Brasil	Milton Cunha	
1999	10th place	Grupo Especial	Barbosa Lima, 101 anos do sobrinho do Brasil	Maurício Maia; Roger Linhares	
2000	8th place	Grupo Especial	Pra não dizer que não falei de flores	Mário Borriello	
2000	8th place	Grupo Especial	Pra não dizer que não falei de flores	Serginho do Porto	
2001	13th place	Grupo Especial	A União faz a força, com muita energia!	Wany Araújo	
2001	13th place	Grupo Especial	A União faz a força, com muita energia!	Wander Pires	
2002	3rd place	Grupo A	Folias de Caxias - De João a João... É o Carnaval da União!	Mário Borriello	
2002	3rd place	Grupo A	Folias de Caxias - De João a João... É o Carnaval da União!	Ito Melodia	
2003	2nd place	Grupo A	Chega em seu cavalinho azul uma bruxinha boa. An Ilha trouxe do céu Maria Clara Machado	Paulo Menezes	
2003	2nd place	Grupo A	Chega em seu cavalinho azul uma bruxinha boa. An Ilha trouxe do céu Maria Clara Machado	Ito Melodia	
2004	7th place	Grupo A	Com Pandeiro ou Sem Pandeiro... Eu Brinco. Com Dinheiro ou Sem Dinheiro... Eu Também Brinco!	Paulo Menezes	
2004	7th place	Grupo A	Com Pandeiro ou Sem Pandeiro... Eu Brinco. Com Dinheiro ou Sem Dinheiro... Eu Também Brinco!	Ito Melodia	
2005	2nd place	Grupo A	Das Veredas dos Trilhos an um Sonho de Fé... A Ilha Traz a Conquista do Pináculo, Corcovado Tentação	Alaôr Junior; Antônio Roberto	
2005	2nd place	Grupo A	Das Veredas dos Trilhos an um Sonho de Fé... A Ilha Traz a Conquista do Pináculo, Corcovado Tentação	Ito Melodia	
2006	3rd place	Grupo A	Das Minas Del Rei São João	Jack Vasconcelos	
2006	3rd place	Grupo A	Das Minas Del Rei São João	Ito Melodia	
2007	4th place	Grupo A	Ripa na Tulipa, Ilha!	Paulo Menezes; Jack Vasconcelos; André Marins	
2007	4th place	Grupo A	Ripa na Tulipa, Ilha!	Ito Melodia	
2008	5th place	Grupo A	É hoje o dia	Jack Vasconcelos	
2008	5th place	Grupo A	É hoje o dia	Ito Melodia	
2009	Champion	Grupo A	Viajar é Preciso - Viagens extraordinárias através de Mundos conhecidos e desconhecidos	Jack Vasconcelos	
2009	Champion	Grupo A	Viajar é Preciso - Viagens extraordinárias através de Mundos conhecidos e desconhecidos	Ito Melodia	
2010	11th place	Grupo Especial	Dom Quixote de La Mancha, o cavaleiro dos sonhos impossíveis	Rosa Magalhães	
2010	11th place	Grupo Especial	Dom Quixote de La Mancha, o cavaleiro dos sonhos impossíveis	Ito Melodia	
2011	Hors Concours	Grupo Especial	O mistério da vida	Alex de Souza	
2011	Hors Concours	Grupo Especial	O mistério da vida	Ito Melodia	
2012	8th place	Grupo Especial	De Londres ao Rio: Era uma vez... uma Ilha.	Alex de Souza	
2012	8th place	Grupo Especial	De Londres ao Rio: Era uma vez... uma Ilha.	Ito Melodia	
2013	9th place	Grupo Especial	Vinícius, no plural. Paixão, poesia e carnaval	Alex de Souza	
2013	9th place	Grupo Especial	Vinícius, no plural. Paixão, poesia e carnaval	Ito Melodia	
2014	4th place	Grupo Especial	É Brinquedo, é brincadeira. An Ilha vai levantar poeira!	Alex de Souza	
2014	4th place	Grupo Especial	É Brinquedo, é brincadeira. An Ilha vai levantar poeira!	Ito Melodia	
2015	9th place	Grupo Especial	Beleza Pura?	Alex de Souza	
2015	9th place	Grupo Especial	Beleza Pura?	Ito Melodia	
2016	11th place	Grupo Especial	Olímpico por natureza.Todo mundo se encontra no Rio!	Paulo Menezes; Jack Vasconcelos; André Marins	
2016	11th place	Grupo Especial	Olímpico por natureza.Todo mundo se encontra no Rio!	Ito Melodia	
2017	8th place	Grupo Especial	Nzara Ndembu - Glória ao senhor tempo	Severo Luzardo	
2017	8th place	Grupo Especial	Nzara Ndembu - Glória ao senhor tempo	Ito Melodia	
2018	10th place	Grupo Especial	Brasil, bom de boca	Severo Luzardo	
2018	10th place	Grupo Especial	Brasil, bom de boca	Ito Melodia	
2019	10th place	Grupo Especial	A peleja poética entre Rachel e Alencar no avarandado do céu	Severo Luzardo	
2019	10th place	Grupo Especial	A peleja poética entre Rachel e Alencar no avarandado do céu	Ito Melodia	
2020	13th place	Grupo Especial	Nas encruzilhadas da vida, entre becos, ruas e vielas, a sorte está lançada: salve-se quem puder!	Laíla; Fran Sérgio; Cahê Rodrigues; Larissa Pereira; Anderson Netto; Allan Barbosa; Felipe Costa	
2020	13th place	Grupo Especial	Nas encruzilhadas da vida, entre becos, ruas e vielas, a sorte está lançada: salve-se quem puder!	Ito Melodia	
2022	3rd place	Série Ouro	O vendedor de orações	Cahê Rodrigues; Severo Luzardo	
2022	3rd place	Série Ouro	O vendedor de orações	Ito Melodia	
