= Madureira, Rio de Janeiro =

Madureira
- Neighborhood
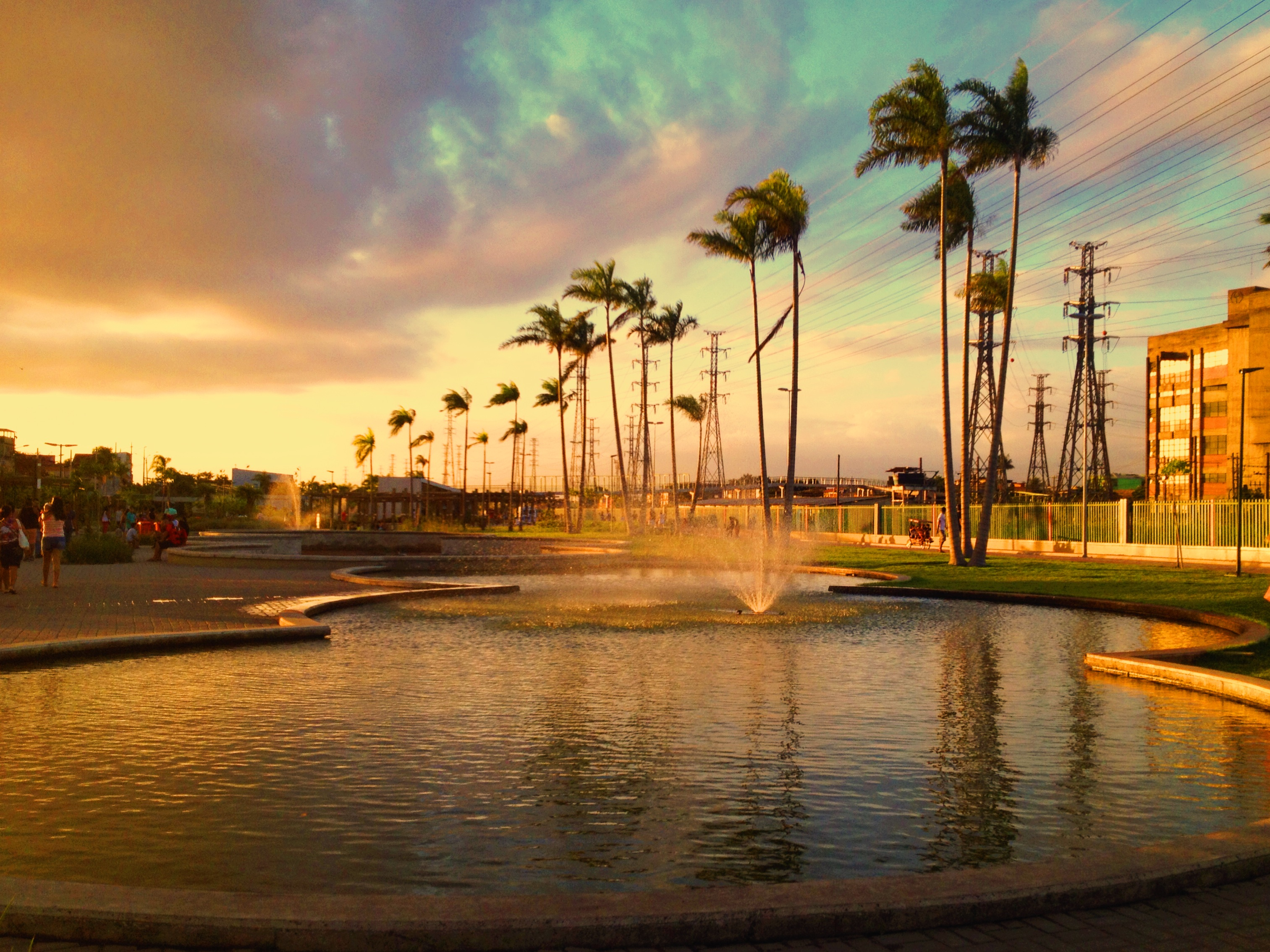

- Location in Rio de Janeiro Madureira (Brazil)
- Coordinates: 22°52′15″S 43°20′12″W
- Country: Brazil
- State: Rio de Janeiro (RJ)
- Municipality/City: Rio de Janeiro
- Zone: North Zone

Madureira is a lower-middle-class neighborhood in the North Zone of the city of Rio de Janeiro, Brazil.

The suburb is the hub to several bus lines that reach several parts of the city of Rio de Janeiro. It is famous for being home of the samba schools Portela and Império Serrano, two of the most traditional samba schools of Rio de Janeiro.

Madureira borders other suburbs such as Cascadura, Cavalcanti, Vaz Lobo, Engenheiro Leal, Turiaçu, Campinho and Oswaldo Cruz, and it has approximately 50 thousand inhabitants.

== People ==
- Tia Surica, (1940), samba singer.
- Arlindo Cruz, samba singer.
- Gerson King Combo (1943–2020), soul and funk singer.
- Jorge Ben, singer.

== Sports ==
- Madureira Esporte Clube is the neighbourhood's football club. They play at Estádio Conselheiro Galvão, also located in the neighbourhood.

== In popular culture ==
=== Songs ===
- Rua Madureira, by Nino Ferrer (1969)
- Alo Madureira, by Arlindo Cruz
- Meu lugar, by Arlindo Cruz
- Madureira, by Heitor dos Prazeres
- Madureira, lugar da raça, by Leci Brandão
- São José de Madureira, by Zeca Pagodinho
- Madureira chorou, by Jair Rodrigues
- Vampiro de Madureira, by MC Carol & MC Gorila

=== Cinema ===
- In the film Um Ano Inesquecível – Verão (An unforgettable year - Summer) (2023), by Cris D'Amato, a young woman gets a job as a seamstress in Portela, the emblematic samba school of Madureira, and discovers the world of carnival.

=== Literature ===
- In the short story Amor de Carnaval, by Thalita Rebouças, from the collection Um Ano Inesquecível, (2015), a young woman gets a job as a seamstress in Portela, the emblematic samba school of Madureira, and discovers the world of carnival.
- The title of the novel Madureira quase chorou (2022), by Betty Steinberg (2022), refers to the samba Madureira chorou.
- The plot of the novel O Grande Dia (The Big Day), by Pierre Cormon (2024), revolves around the parade of an imaginary samba school, Unidos de Madureira. Several scenes take place in Madureira and its Mercadão.
