= Pitangueiras =

Pitangueiras may refer to the following places in Brazil:

- Pitangueiras, Paraná
- Pitangueiras, São Paulo
- Pitangueiras, Rio de Janeiro
- Pitangueiras River
