= Caxangá (Recife) =

Neighborhood in Recife, Brazil

Coordinates: 8.0308°S 34.9497°W

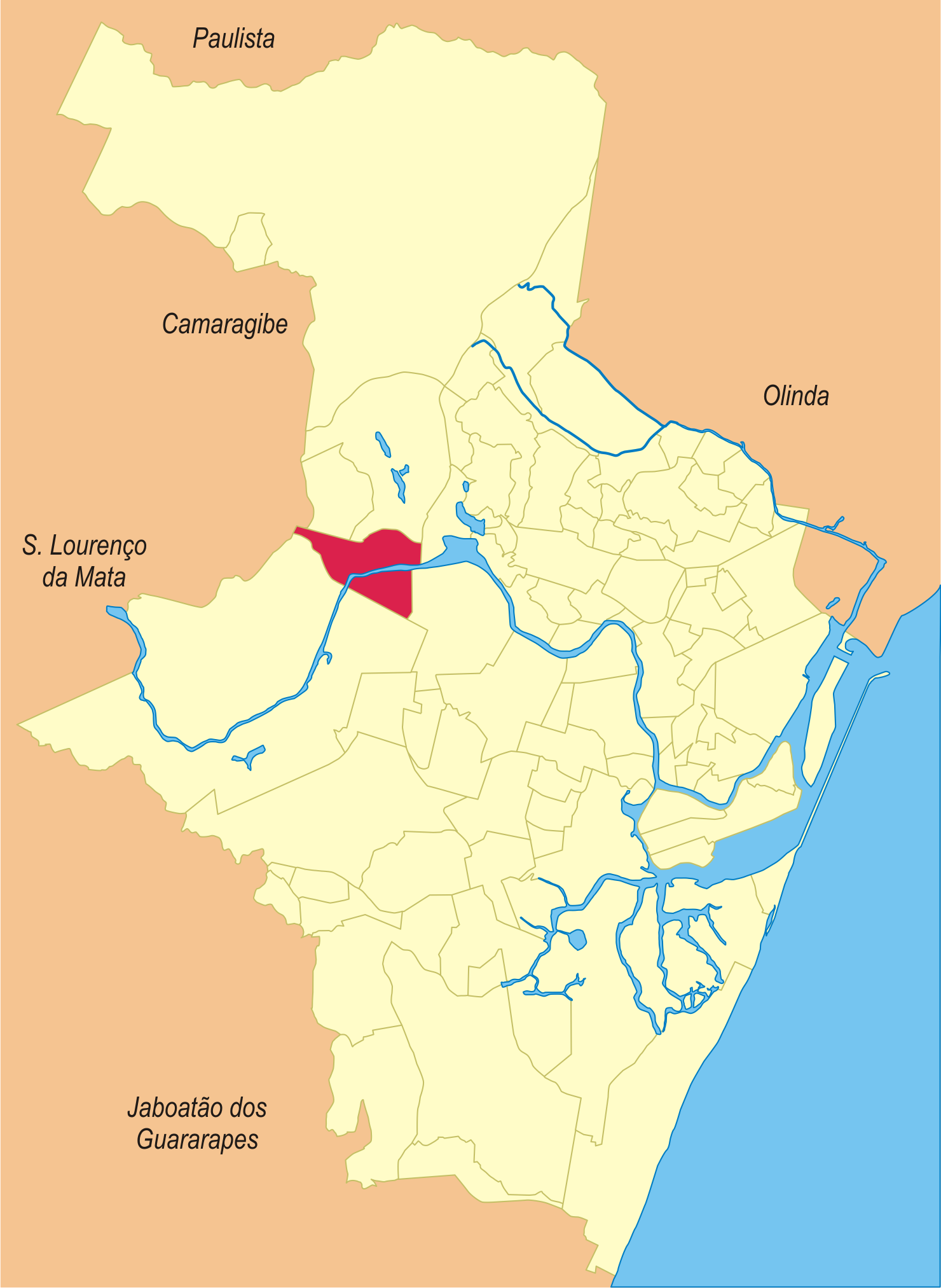
Location in Recife

Caxangá is a neighborhood in Recife, Brazil, located on the banks of the Capibaribe River, eleven kilometers from the center of Recife.

The neighborhood was first populated by the canon Francisco Pereira Lopes, in the late eighteenth century, when he built a house and a chapel dedicated to St. Francis of Paula there. It is located by the Caxangá Golf and Country Club.

== Avenida Caxangá ==
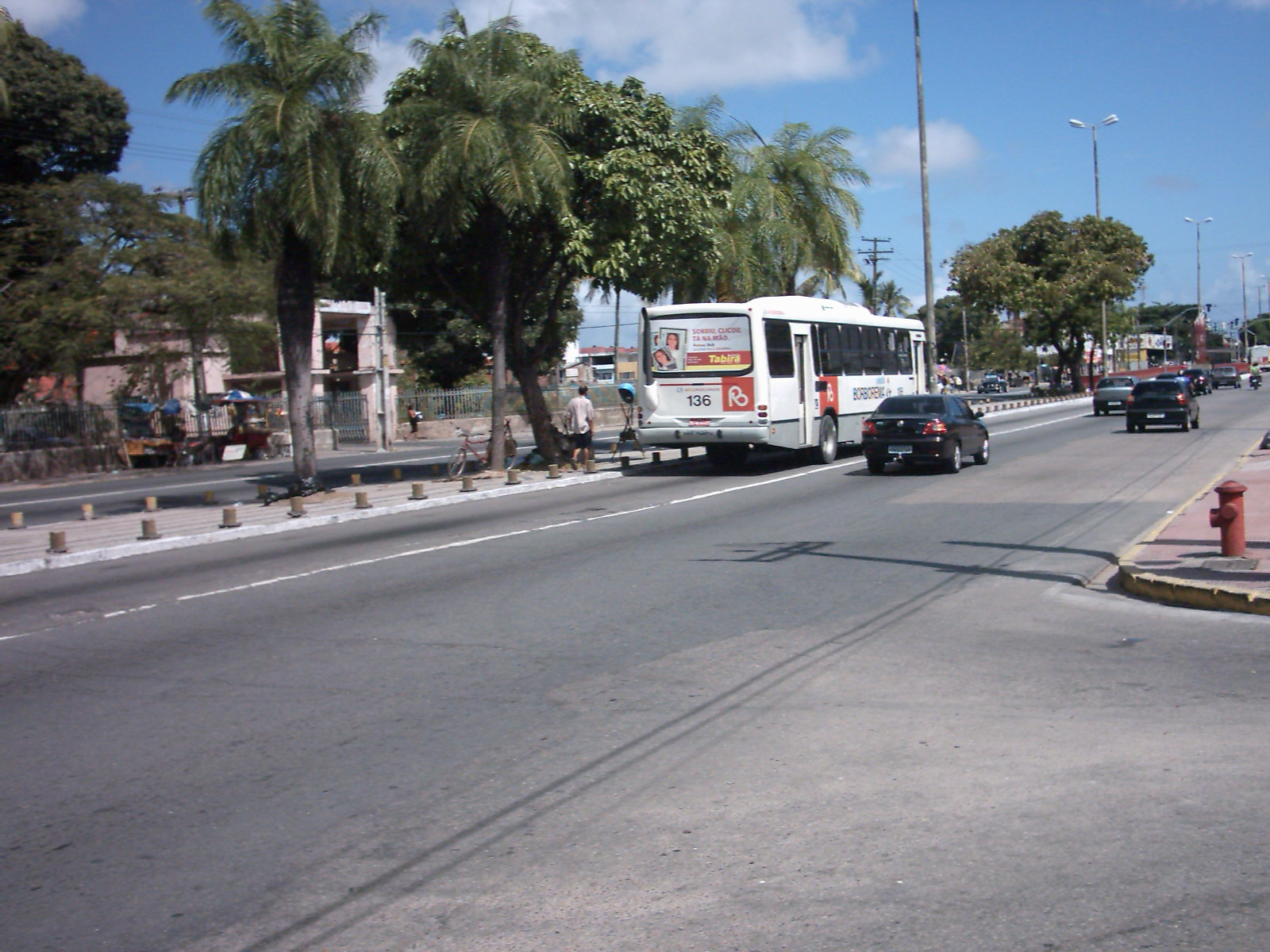
Avenue Caxangá in the city of Recife

The Caxangá avenue is one of the most important arterial roads of the city of Recife, capital of Pernambuco state, Brazil. It is considered the second longest straight line avenue in Brazil, with a route of about 6.2 km. It was the longest straight line avenue until the construction of Teotônio Segurado Avenue in the capital of Tocantins, Palmas, which has two stretches of straight lines, one stretch of 10.2 km and one for 9.5 km for a total of 19.7 km. However, Caxangá Avenue remains the longest avenue whose total length is developed in a straight line. The Caxangá Avenue began construction in 1833, and the French engineer Louis Léger Vauthier, in 1843, in a report, enumerated the advantages of roads in Recife.

In 1845 the Caxangá suspension bridge (the first of its kind in Brazil) was completed, which opened the way to the interior of Pernambuco. Formerly known as Estrada do Paudalho, it was also called Estrada de Ambolê . However, it was at the Estado Novo time, in the administration of mayor Novaes Filho, that Caxangá Avenue was paved with cobblestones grouted with cement on concrete, expanded through landfills and protected works (structures such as culverts, bridges, retaining walls necessary for the construction of roads), and was inaugurated on 25 May 1940. In the third administration of Pelopidas Silveira it was again expanded, and in 1966 the construction of a second reinforced concrete lane began. After being created to be the exclusive bus corridor through the middle of the avenue, it has increased its capacity and now part of the corridor east–west project.

The Caxangá avenue begins at João Alfredo Square, next to the old mill of Madalena, the Sobrado da Madalena, which gave origin and name to the neighborhood. Then through the neighborhoods Zumbi, Cordeiro, Iputinga, the avenue ends in the neighborhood of Caxangá at the Caxangá Bridge (Ponte Marechal Castello Branco) on the Capibaribe river. In the neighborhood of Iputinga, it crosses beneath the BR-101, the Viaduct Caxangá, which runs through the city in a north–south direction. Currently, with the buildings and the trees, apart from the heavy traffic throughout the day, it is no longer possible to view the Sobrado da Madalena. However, until the 1970s, the observer being at the heart of Caxangá bridge, could see perfectly the Sobrado da Madalena from a 6 km distant.
