= Zumbi, Rio de Janeiro =

Zumbi
- Neighborhood
- Location in Rio de Janeiro Zumbi (Brazil)
- Coordinates: 22°49′16″S 43°10′32″W
- Country: Brazil
- State: Rio de Janeiro (RJ)
- Municipality/City: Rio de Janeiro
- Zone: North

Population (2010)
  - Total: 2,016

Zumbi is a neighborhood in the North Zone of Rio de Janeiro, Brazil.

== History ==
The neighborhood is located on Ilha do Governador and developed gradually around the Saco de Jequiá, a marshy inlet at the mouth of the now-canalized and submerged Jequiá River. Its few streets contain the Luís Alves de Lima e Silva Military Police Battalion, the Jequiá Iate Clube, the Municipal School Cuba, and the Necker Pinto municipal health clinic. It borders the neighborhood of Cacuia to the north and west, from which it is heavily shaded at sunset due to the hill that gives Cacuia its name. To the east, it borders Pitangueiras. It also serves as a dividing point between these areas and the neighborhood of Ribeira, which is often grouped together with them in common usage.
