= Portuguesa =

Portuguesa is a Portuguese, Catalan, and Spanish feminine adjective meaning "Portuguese". It may also refer to:

== Places ==
- Portuguesa (state), one of the 23 states of Venezuela
- Portuguesa (Rio de Janeiro), a neighbourhood of Rio de Janeiro, Brazil
- Portuguesa River, a river in Venezuela
- Portuguese Circary, of the Premonstratensians
- Portuguesa or Chiqllarasu, a mountain in Peru
- Portuguesa Province, 1851–1864, one of the provinces of Venezuela

== Sports ==
- Associação Portuguesa de Desportos, a football club based in São Paulo, Brazil
- Associação Atlética Portuguesa (RJ), a football club based in Rio de Janeiro, Brazil
- Associação Atlética Portuguesa (Santos), a football club based in Santos, Brazil
- Associação Portuguesa Londrinense, a football club based in Londrina, Brazil
- Portuguesa Fútbol Club, a football club based in Acarígua, Venezuela

== Other uses ==
- Portuguese language
- "A Portuguesa", the Portuguese national anthem
- TV Portuguesa, a defunct South African television channel
