= Monero (disambiguation) =

Monero is a cryptocurrency. It may also refer to:

== Places ==
- Monero, New Mexico, a populated place located in Rio Arriba County, US
- Moneró, Rio de Janeiro, a neighborhood in Brazil

== People ==
- Mark Monero (born 1968), British actor
- José Luis Moneró (1921–2011), Puerto Rican musician and band leader
- María Luisa Moneró, actress in the film The Lady from Trévelez
