= Cidade Nova (disambiguation) =

Cidade Nova can refer to:

- Cidade Nova, a neighbourhood in Belo Horizonte, Minas Gerais, Brazil
- Cidade Nova (Manaus), a neighbourhood in Manaus, Amazonas, Brazil
- Cidade Nova (Rio de Janeiro), a neighbourhood in Rio de Janeiro, Brazil
  - Cidade Nova Station, a station on Rio de Janeiro Metro's Line 2, located in and serving the western part of the neighbourhood
