= Anchieta rail disaster =

1952 railway incident in Brazil

Coordinates: 22°49′15″S 43°24′26″W

Anchieta trem desastre
- Localização Anchieta, Rio de Janeiro

Details
- Date: Março 4, 1952; 8:40 da amanhã.
- Location: Anchieta, Rio de Janeiro
- Country: Brazil
- Operator: Estrada de Ferro Central do Brasil
- Incident type: Deslizamento e colisão
- Cause: Quebrado trilho

Statistics
- Trains: 2
- Deaths: 119
- Injured: up to 250

The Anchieta rail disaster, occurred on March 4, 1952, in Anchieta, a suburb twenty miles north of the centre of Rio de Janeiro in Brazil. 119 people were killed and the resulting outcry prompted major new investment in Brazilian railways. This accident is considered the third-deadliest rail accident in Brazilian history.

== Accident ==
At 8:40 a.m. a crowded steam-powered passenger train was slowly crossing a bridge over the Pavuna River near Anchieta station when it derailed, sending two old wooden carriages broadside onto the adjacent line. Almost immediately a modern high-speed electric freight train travelling in the opposite direction plowed into the wooden carriages, telescoping them upwards. The severity of the accident was compounded by the fact that as was common practice the suburban train was overloaded, with passengers clinging to the sides, underneath and between the carriages. A witness said they saw "passengers flying in all directions when the crash occurred". In all 119 people were killed and as many as 250 were injured.

The engineer of the steam train fled the scene with his locomotive which was later found abandoned as he went into hiding. The reason for his disappearance was a peculiar law which stated that an engineer arrested at the scene of an accident could be detained indefinitely without bail. If he escaped arrest for 48 hours though he could remain free until convicted of negligence or serious misconduct.

== Response ==
In the time leading up to the disaster fatal accidents were an almost daily occurrence on Brazilian railways and there were 1442 derailments in 1950 alone. The government-owned Estrada de Ferro Central do Brasil (Central Railway of Brazil) which operated both the trains involved had itself frequently been accused of negligence due to its high number of fatal accidents. The tracks were carrying more and heavier trains than they had been originally designed to handle. As the death toll from the disaster mounted there was public outcry against the 'slaughter on the railroads', led by the Brazilian press. Extra police were stationed at the Dom Pedro Segundo railway terminal in Rio to stop possible demonstrations. An investigation was launched by the Central Railroad. The cause of the initial derailment was found to be a broken rail, but the official report also found that the railway was in a 'deplorable and dangerous condition'. In response President Getúlio Vargas ordered the immediate renovation of 120 miles of track known to be in a dangerous state, and requested the purchase of 200 new electric locomotives and appropriate rolling stock to provide safer and more reliable services, financed through foreign loans.
