= Estádio Conselheiro Galvão =

Football stadium in Rio de Janeiro, Brazil

Coordinates: 22°52′11″S 43°20′14″W

- Interactive map of Estádio Conselheiro Galvão
- Full name: Estádio Aniceto Moscoso
- Location: Rio de Janeiro, Rio de Janeiro state, Brazil
- Owner: Madureira Esporte Clube
- Capacity: 10,000
- Surface: Grass
- Field size: 101 m x 68 m

Construction
- Opened: June 15, 1941

Tenant
- Madureira Esporte Clube

Estádio Aniceto Moscoso, usually known as Estádio Conselheiro Galvão, is a football stadium in Madureira neighborhood, Rio de Janeiro, Brazil. The stadium has a maximum capacity of 3,314 people. The field dimensions are 101 m of length and 68 m of width. It was built in 1941.

Estádio Conselheiro Galvão is owned by Madureira Esporte Clube. The stadium is nicknamed after the street where it is located, Conselheiro Galvão Street.

== History ==
In 1941, the works on Estádio Conselheiro Galvão were completed. The inaugural match was played on June 15 of that year, when Madureira beat Fluminense 3-1.

In 1995, the grass was reformed, and it was considered one of the best of Rio de Janeiro state at the time.
