= Santíssimo =

- Neighborhood
- Location in Rio de Janeiro Santíssimo (Brazil)
- Coordinates: 22°52′46″S 43°31′22″W
- Country: Brazil
- State: Rio de Janeiro (RJ)
- Municipality/City: Rio de Janeiro
- Zone: West Zone

Population (2010)
  - Total: 41,458

Santíssimo is a neighborhood in the West Zone of Rio de Janeiro, Brazil, near Campo Grande. Most residents are in the low-income group.

In the beginning the railroad stations proceeded on this order: Bangu, Senador Camará, Santíssimo, Senador Vasconcelos, and Campo Grande. Santíssimo was prosperous in the epoch that Rio de Janeiro exported oranges to foreign countries. There were small stores near market places where the oranges were beneficials for exportation. With the end of the rural period in the city of Rio de Janeiro, Santíssimo became disowned into a neighborhood merely dormitory or a neighborhood of passages to the regions more forward on the map of the city of Rio de Janeiro, on the direction of the west region.

Nowadays the neighborhood of Santíssimo has a constant increase of its population in irregular lands that multiply compromising even the rich mountainous geography of the region. Stuck in the middle of Parque da Pedra Branca (White Stone Park, in English), the neighborhood of Santíssimo is also one more example of the neglect of local authorities to control the occupation of the urban space.
