= Campo Grande, Rio de Janeiro =

Campo Grande
- Neighborhood
- Location in Rio de Janeiro Campo Grande (Brazil)
- Coordinates: 22°52′57″S 43°33′45″W
- Country: Brazil
- State: Rio de Janeiro (RJ)
- Municipality/City: Rio de Janeiro
- Zone: West Zone

Population (2022)
  - Total: 352,704

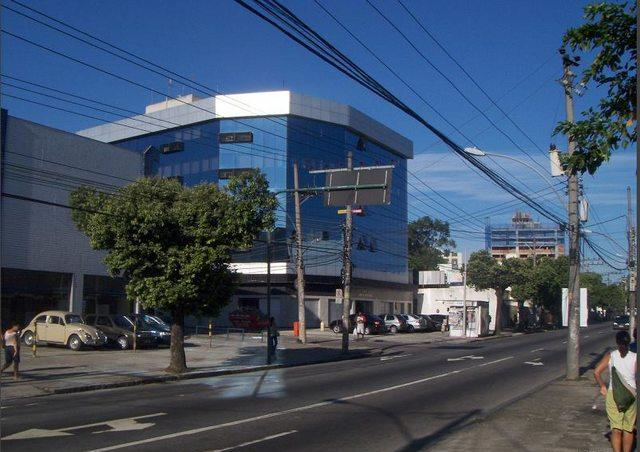
A building in Cesário de Melo avenue, Campo Grande's commercial center

Campo Grande is the largest neighborhood in the West Zone of Rio de Janeiro. Campo Grande has a population of 328,370 inhabitants and an area of 119 km^{2} (46 mi^{2}), on both counts Rio's largest. It is situated 50 kilometres (31 mi) away from Downtown Rio.

The Campo Grande neighborhood is the headquarters of the administrative region of Campo Grande, which includes the neighborhoods of Campo Grande, Inhoaíba, Senador Vasconcelos and Santíssimo. Its occupation dates back to November 17, 1603, mainly due to the numerous Jesuit works in the region.

== History ==
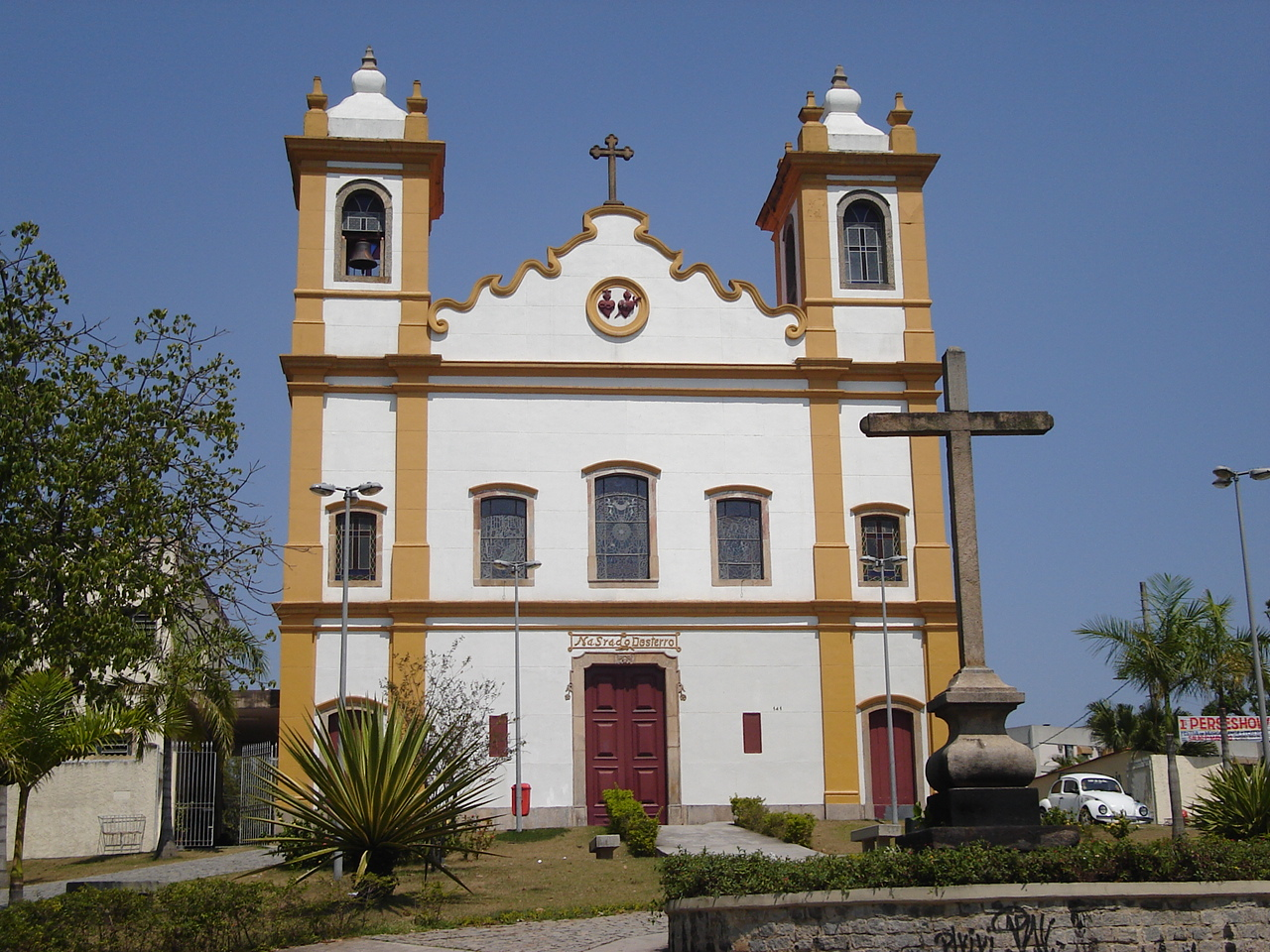
Church of Our Lady of the Exile (Igreja de Na. Sra. do Desterro), built in 1673

Campo Grande, which in the early 1940s was considered the "Empire of the Orange", grew along with the settlement of Brazil. The valley, which begins in the Rio da Prata and ends in Cabuçu, was inhabited by Picinguabas and granted by the Portuguese Crown to Barcelos Domingos. In 1673, Domingos built the chapel of Our Lady of the Exile, which later became the parish church of Campo Grande. Near the church was a well also called Our Lady of the Exile, which provided water to the local population.

The region began to grow in 1878 with the inauguration of the Campo Grande railway station, connected to the Estrada de Ferro Central do Brasil (Brazilian Central Railway). It became easier to reach the center of the city quickly, and the region began to develop at a rapid pace.

On October 16, 1895, Campo Grande began tram service. On that day, the Municipal Council gave a concession to a private company, the Companhia de Carros Urbanos (Urban Streetcar Company), to install a line using animal power. The goal was to provide transportation to the railway.

In 1915, the company proposed to the Prefecture of the Federal District the substitution of animal power with 48 km of electrified lines, whose trams would leave from the center of Campo Grande for Pedra de Guaratiba, Ilha, and Rio da Prata. The line remained in service until October 30, 1967, when trams were removed from Campo Grande.

Campo Grande went from being an essentially rural area to an urban one. Next to Realengo, Jacarepaguá, and Santa Cruz, until 1939 Campo Grande was one of the largest producers of oranges, exporting up to 144,577 tons each year.

== Development ==
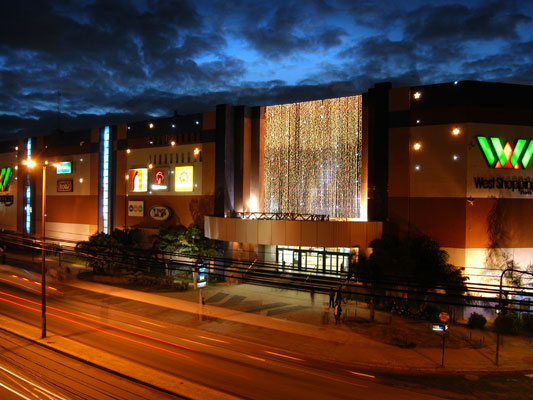
West Shopping Rio mall in Campo Grande, adorned with Christmas decorations.

The city fabric of Campo Grande is regular and discontinuous, the habitation of the area consisting in isolated lots of large areas. Owing to the large network of services and a growing level of commerce, Campo Grande grew at an extraordinary pace.

High levels of homeownership are found in Campo Grande. Three-bedroom houses are most common, with an area of 120 square meters. In 1962 and 1979, CEHAB built the Conjunto Santa Margarida on the Estrada do Campinho.

In terms of education, Campo Grande has one of the largest concentrations of students in the Rio de Janeiro (state). The rate of school attendance is satisfactory, as is the rate of enrollment, which has increased yearly.

The Miécimo da Silva Sports Complex, in which sports training is provided to the population in Campo Grande, hosts major international events such as the 2007 Pan American Games.

== City of Campo Grande ==
On June 14, 1968, the locality was officially designated a city (Portuguese: cidade) under Law #1627, advanced by the deputy Frederico Trotta, though it remained part of the city and municipality of Rio de Janeiro.

== Industry and commerce ==
Commerce in the neighborhood is self-sufficient, attracting business from other regions. Campo Grande has two shopping malls, West Shopping and the ParkShopping Campo Grande, which is planning to be the biggest in South America. The industrial sector is also growing. Campo Grande has an Industrial District on km. 43 of the Avenida Brasil, reaching the Estrada do Pedregoso.

In 1946, Bartolomeu Rabelo founded an aviary that was the birthplace of carioca bird farming, which today has attained a high level of development.

Some of the companies found in Campo Grande include AmBev, Refrigerantes Convenção, Guaracamp, Cogumelo (metallurgy), Fredvic (heating), Novartis (pharmaceuticals), Sacipan (café Câmara), Michelin, EBSE (electrical fuses), Superpesa (metallurgy), Dancor (munitions) and Ranbaxy (pharmaceuticals).

In Rio da Prata, Mendanha, and Guaratiba, one can still find agriculture and livestock. Among the most common crops are bananas, oranges, mangoes, pears, cassava root, and chayotes. In terms of birds and livestock, one can find goat antelopes, pigs, cow, and rabbit. Campo Grande remains one of the most industrialized suburbs of Rio de Janeiro. Campo grande is a great place to conduct business because population is increasing over the years.

== Sub-neighborhoods of Campo Grande ==
- Adriana (in Portuguese)
- Alessandra
- Amanda
- Amazonas
- Andréa
- Araújo
- Arnaldo Eugênio
- Benjamim do Monte
- BNH
- Carina
- Caroba
- Carobinha
- Carolina
- Comari
- Corcundinha
- Cosmos
- Débora
- Inhoaíba
- Isadora
- Jardim da Luz (in Portuguese)
- Jardim Letícia
- Jardim Nova Guaratiba
- Jardim Paulista
- Jardim Terra Firme
- Joari
- Magali
- Manguariba
- Manuela
- Mendanha
- Monteiro
- Morada
- Morada do Campo
- Moriçaba
- Novo Campo Grande
- Oiticica
- Padre Belisário
- Pedra Angular
- Pedregoso
- Rio da Prata
- Rozendo (in Portuguese)
- Santa Cecília
- Santa Rosa
- Santa Margarida
- Santíssimo
- Santo Antônio
- São Geraldo
- São Basílio
- São Cláudio
- São Pedro
- São Jorge
- São Vítor
- Senador Vasconcelos
- Souza
- Tingüi
- Vila Adelaide
- Vila Eunice
- Vila Izete
- Vila Jardim
- Vila Mariana
- Vila Nova
- Vila Santa Rita
- Vila São João
- Vilar Carioca
