= Bancários =

Neighborhood in Rio de Janeiro

Coordinates: 22°47′S 43°11′W

Bancários is a neighborhood located at Ilha do Governador in the North Zone of Rio de Janeiro, Brazil. As of 2010 it has a population of 12,512.
