= Barros Filho =

- Neighborhood
- Location in Rio de Janeiro Barros Filho (Brazil)
- Coordinates: 22°50′11″S 43°21′56″W
- Country: Brazil
- State: Rio de Janeiro (RJ)
- Municipality/City: Rio de Janeiro
- Zone: North Zone

Population (2010)
  - Total: 14,049

Barros Filho is a lower-class neighbourhood in the North Zone of Rio de Janeiro. It is one of the poorest areas in the city. Its name honours the farmer's son who gave land from his farm Boa Esperança (what is now the neighbourhoods of Barros Filho, Costa Barros and part of Guadalupe and Honório Gurgel), Antônio da Costa Barros for the construction of the railway which was inaugurated in 1908.
