= Jardim Guanabara =

Neighborhood of Rio de Janeiro, Brazil

- Neighborhood
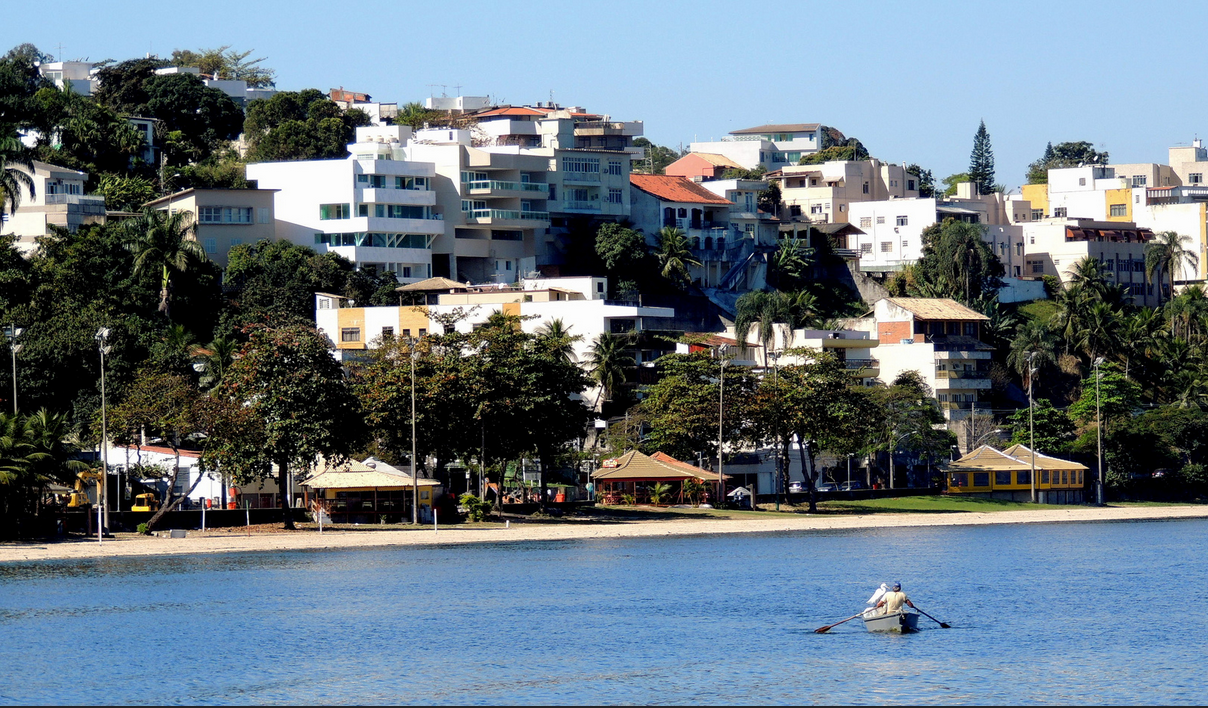

- Location in Rio de Janeiro Jardim Guanabara (Brazil)
- Coordinates: 22°48′42″S 43°12′13″W
- Country: Brazil
- State: Rio de Janeiro (RJ)
- Municipality/City: Rio de Janeiro
- Zone: North Zone

Jardim Guanabara is a neighborhood located in Ilha do Governador, Rio de Janeiro, Brazil. A point of interest is a beach named Praia da Bica, with a view of the city.
