= Vista Alegre, Rio Grande do Sul =

Municipality of Rio Grande do Sul, Brazil

Vista Alegre
- Municipality
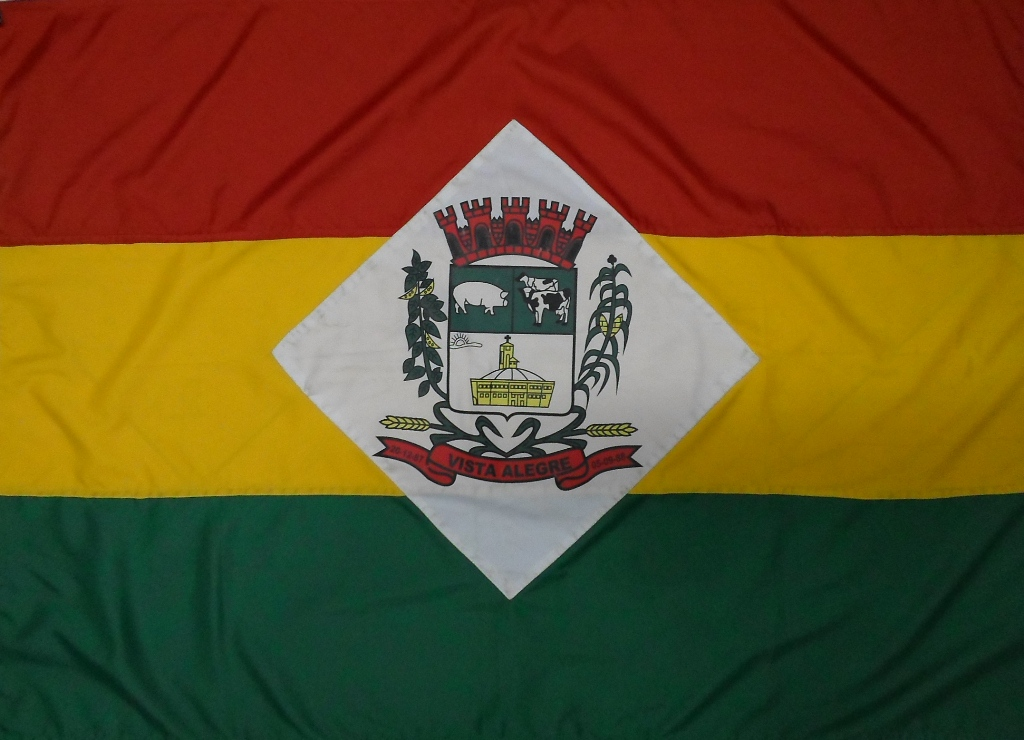
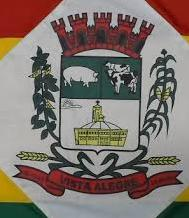
- Flag Coat of arms

- Location in Rio Grande do Sul state

- Location in Brazil
- Coordinates: 27°22′9″S 53°29′33″W
- Country: Brazil
- State: Rio Grande do Sul

Area
  - Total: 77.46 km^{2} (29.91 sq mi)
- Elevation: 546 m (1,791 ft)

Population (2020)
  - Total: 2,739
  - Density: 35.36/km^{2} (91.58/sq mi)
- Time zone: UTC−3 (BRT)
- Postal code: 98415-xxx

Vista Alegre is a municipality in the northern part of the state of Rio Grande do Sul, Brazil. The population is 2,739 (2020 est.) in an area of 77.46 km². Its elevation is 546 m.

== See also ==
- List of municipalities in Rio Grande do Sul
