= São Francisco Xavier =

Coordinates: 22.9118°S 45.9571°W

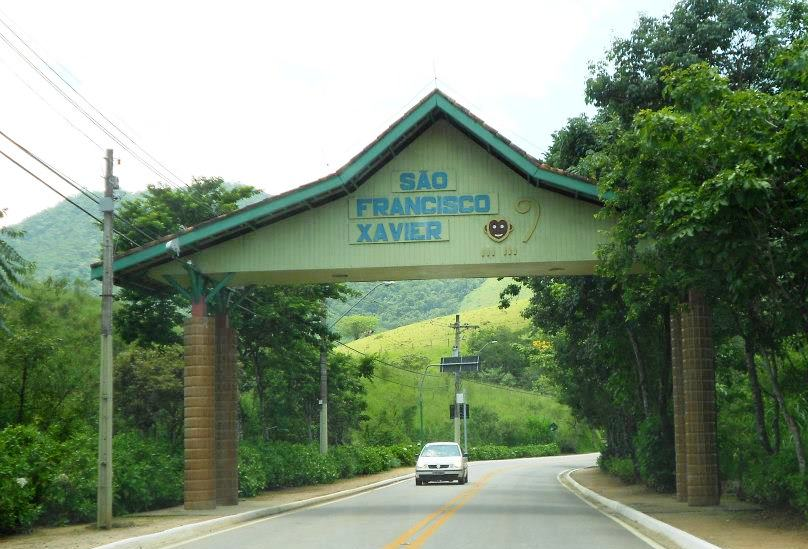
Entrance of the Village of São Francisco Xavier

São Francisco Xavier is a village and an administrative district in the northern part of municipality of São José dos Campos, São Paulo State, Brazil. Surrounded by the Serra da Mantiqueira mountain range, São Francisco Xavier has been an Environmental Protection Area since 8 November 2002. The area has remnants of the Atlantic Forest as well as diverse flora and fauna native to the region.

The village is situated at an altitude of 720 metres (2,360 ft). Ecotourist attractions include hiking and mountain biking trails and several points where paragliding is possible. The main festivals in the region include the Party of the Tropeiro, the Fresta da Carpição and the Feast of São Gonçalo, as well as celebration of the birthday of St. Francis Xavier.
