= Pitangueiras, Paraná =

Pitangueiras
- Municipality
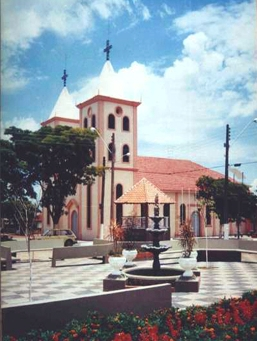

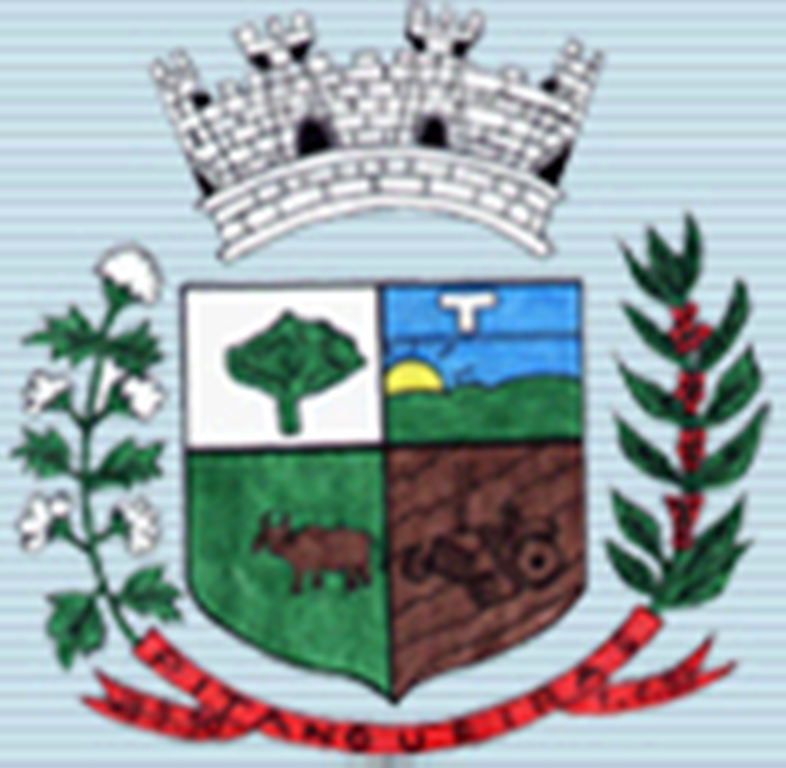
- Coat of arms

- Location in Paraná state

- Location in Brazil
- Coordinates: 23°13′50″S 51°35′8″W
- Country: Brazil
- Region: South
- State: Paraná

Area
  - Total: 123 km^{2} (47 sq mi)

Population (2020)
  - Total: 3,262
  - Density: 26.5/km^{2} (68.7/sq mi)
- Time zone: UTC−3 (BRT)

Pitangueiras is a municipality in the state of Paraná in Brazil. The population is 3,262 (2020 est.) in an area of 123 km^{2}. The elevation is 660 m.
