= Jardim Carioca =

- Neighborhood
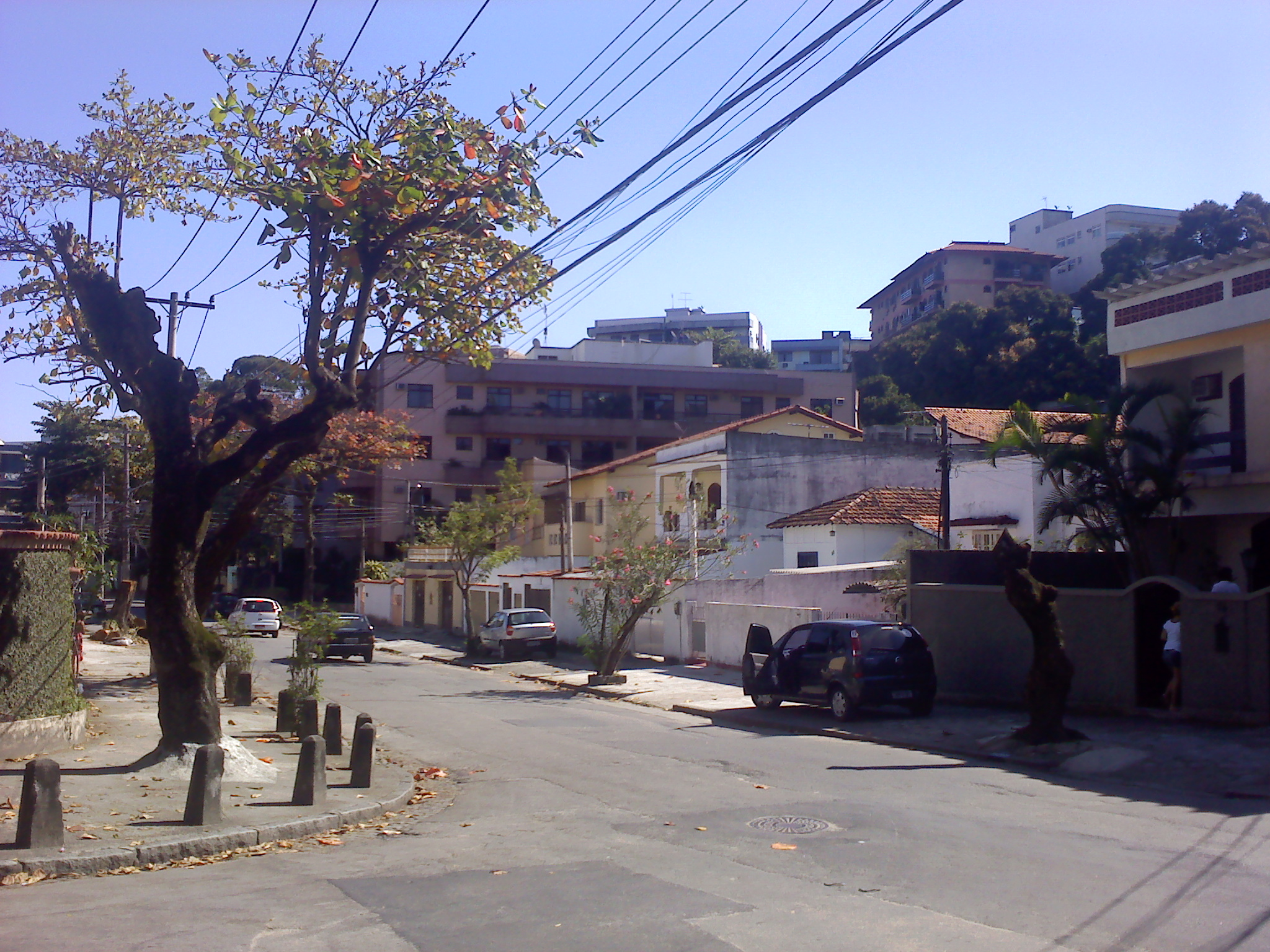

- Location in Rio de Janeiro Jardim Carioca (Brazil)
- Coordinates: 22°48′21″S 43°11′37″W
- Country: Brazil
- State: Rio de Janeiro (RJ)
- Municipality/City: Rio de Janeiro
- Zone: North Zone
- Administrative Region: Ilha do Governador

Area
  - Total: 162.11 ha (400.6 acres)

Population (2010)
  - Total: 24,848
  - Density: 15,328/km^{2} (39,699/sq mi)

Jardim Carioca is a neighborhood in the North Zone of Rio de Janeiro, Brazil.
