= Ricardo de Albuquerque =

- Neighborhood
- Location in Rio de Janeiro Ricardo de Albuquerque (Brazil)
- Coordinates: 22°50′13″S 43°23′51″W
- Country: Brazil
- State: Rio de Janeiro (RJ)
- Municipality/City: Rio de Janeiro
- Zone: North Zone

Population (2010)
  - Total: 29,310

Ricardo de Albuquerque is a neighborhood in the North Zone of Rio de Janeiro, Brazil. It is close to Irajá and São João de Meriti. There are no beaches in this area.
