= Tauá, Rio de Janeiro =

Tauá
- Neighborhood
- Location in Rio de Janeiro Tauá (Brazil)
- Coordinates: 22°47′51″S 43°11′08″W
- Country: Brazil
- State: Rio de Janeiro (RJ)
- Municipality/City: Rio de Janeiro
- Zone: North Zone

Tauá is a neighborhood in the North Zone of Rio de Janeiro, Brazil.
