= Freguesia (Ilha do Governador) =

- Neighborhood
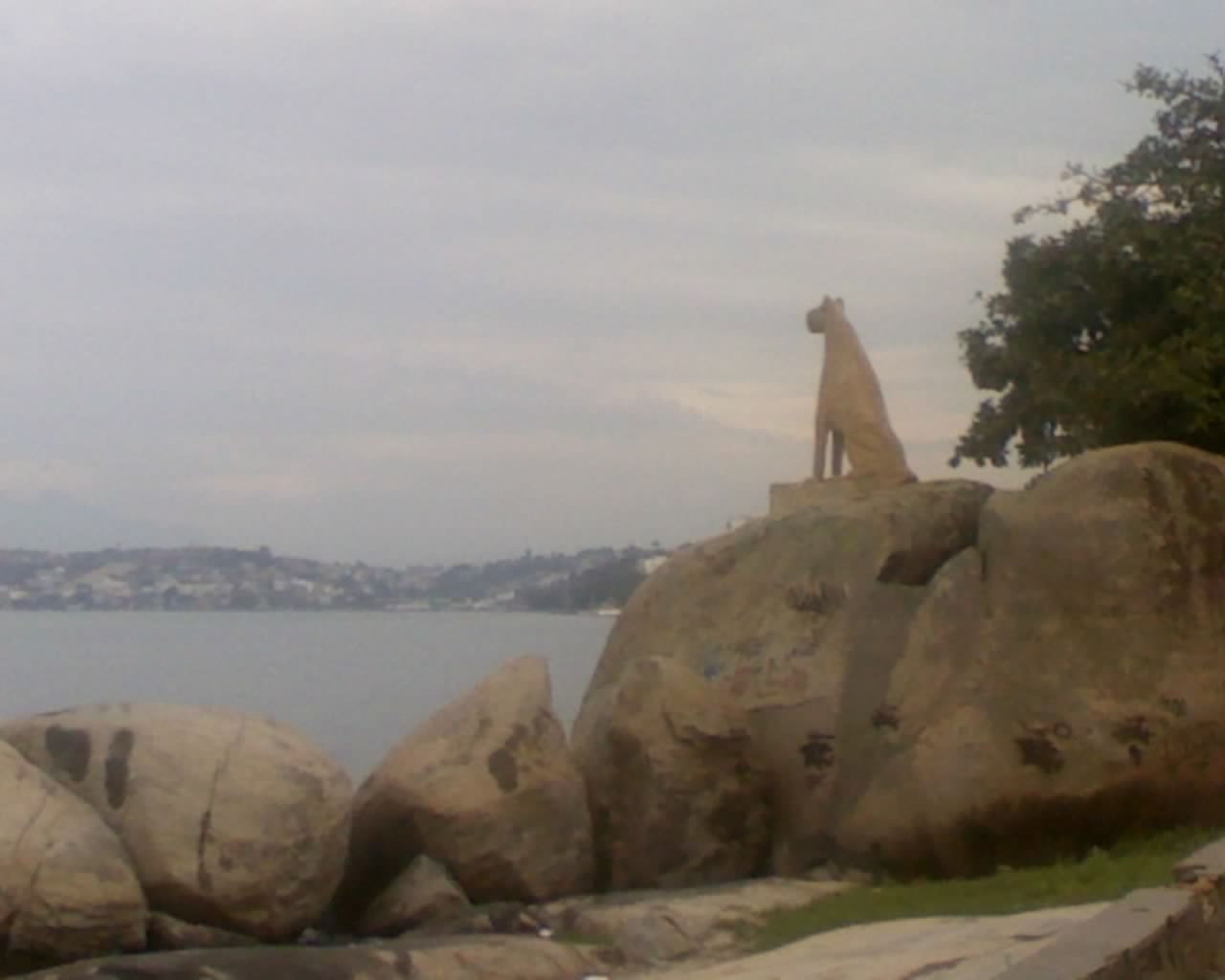

- Coordinates: 22°47′17″S 43°10′21″W
- Country: Brazil
- State: Rio de Janeiro (RJ)
- Municipality/City: Rio de Janeiro
- Zone: North Zone
- Administrative Region: Ilha do Governador

Area
  - Total: 405.64 ha (1,002.4 acres)

Population (2010)
  - Total: 19,437
  - Density: 4,791.7/km^{2} (12,410/sq mi)

Freguesia (Ilha do Governador) is a neighborhood in the North Zone of Rio de Janeiro, Brazil.
