= Praia da Bandeira =

- Neighborhood
- Location in Rio de Janeiro Praia da Bandeira (Brazil)
- Coordinates: 22°48′42″S 43°10′46″W
- Country: Brazil
- State: Rio de Janeiro (RJ)
- Municipality/City: Rio de Janeiro
- Zone: North Zone

Population (2010)
  - Total: 5,948

Praia da Bandeira is a neighborhood in the North Zone of Rio de Janeiro, Brazil.
