= Pedra de Guaratiba =

- Neighborhood
- Location in Rio de Janeiro Pedra de Guaratiba (Brazil)
- Coordinates: 22°59′52″S 43°38′24″W
- Country: Brazil
- State: Rio de Janeiro (RJ)
- Municipality/City: Rio de Janeiro
- Zone: West Zone

Pedra de Guaratiba is a neighborhood in the West Zone of Rio de Janeiro, Brazil.

Pedra de Guaratiba is in the administrative region of Guaratiba. It has a population of 9488 people within a territory of 363,69 hectares. It is a residential zone bordering the Bay of Sepetiba. The Bay of Sepetiba is an area of commercial fishing. The town contains an Area of Environmental Protection (Forest of Casqueiro) in which the flora and fauna is of the Tropical Alanatic Forest (Mata Alantica). The population has grown in recent years principally after the work carried out on the beach and waterfront. Several shows occur in the town including New Year and Carnival, organised by the local district council. The town also includes several renowned restaurants including Cândido's, Amendoeira and 476 famous for its sea food.

The town also is the site of the Church of Our Lady of Desterro constructed in 1626 and the 3rd oldest church in Rio de Janeiro.

The town was to be the site of the Popes World Youth Day Field of Faith Mass but after extensive work and considerable cost it was moved at the last moment to Copacabana beach due to the heavy rains in Pedra de Guaratiba.
