= Moneró, Rio de Janeiro =

Moneró
- Neighborhood
- Location in Rio de Janeiro Moneró (Brazil)
- Coordinates: 22°47′48″S 43°11′55″W
- Country: Brazil
- State: Rio de Janeiro (RJ)
- Municipality/City: Rio de Janeiro
- Zone: North Zone

Moneró is a neighborhood in the North Zone of Rio de Janeiro, Brazil. It has 6,304 inhabitants and a HDI of 0,904
