= Cavalcanti, Rio de Janeiro =

Cavalcanti
- Neighborhood
- Location in Rio de Janeiro Cavalcanti (Brazil)
- Coordinates: 22°52′16″S 43°19′00″W
- Country: Brazil
- State: Rio de Janeiro (RJ)
- Municipality/City: Rio de Janeiro
- Zone: North Zone

Population (2010)
  - Total: 16,141

Cavalcanti is a neighborhood in the North Zone of Rio de Janeiro, Brazil.
