= Colégio, Rio de Janeiro =

Colégio
- Neighborhood
- Location in Rio de Janeiro Colégio (Brazil)
- Coordinates: 22°50′10″S 43°20′12″W
- Country: Brazil
- State: Rio de Janeiro (RJ)
- Municipality/City: Rio de Janeiro
- Zone: North Zone

Colégio is a neighborhood in the North Zone of Rio de Janeiro, Brazil.
