= Parque Colúmbia =

Parque Columbia
- Neighborhood
- Location in Rio de Janeiro Parque Columbia (Brazil)
- Coordinates: 22°48′54″S 43°20′28″W
- Country: Brazil
- State: Rio de Janeiro (RJ)
- Municipality/City: Rio de Janeiro
- Zone: North Zone

Parque Columbia is a neighborhood in the North Zone of Rio de Janeiro, Brazil.
