= Turiaçu, Rio de Janeiro =

Turiaçu
- Neighborhood
- Location in Rio de Janeiro Turiaçu (Brazil)
- Coordinates: 22°51′41″S 43°20′38″W
- Country: Brazil
- State: Rio de Janeiro (RJ)
- Municipality/City: Rio de Janeiro
- Zone: North Zone

Turiaçu is a neighborhood in the North Zone of Rio de Janeiro, Brazil.
