= Portuguesa, Rio de Janeiro =

Portuguesa
- Neighborhood
- Location in Rio de Janeiro Portuguesa (Brazil)
- Coordinates: 22°48′00″S 43°12′26″W
- Country: Brazil
- State: Rio de Janeiro (RJ)
- Municipality/City: Rio de Janeiro
- Zone: North Zone

Population (2010)
  - Total: 23,856

Portuguesa is a neighborhood in the North Zone of Rio de Janeiro, Brazil.
