= Cidade Nova =

Cidade Nova ("New City") is a neighborhood of the northeast region of Belo Horizonte. It was established in the 1960s, and was quickly developed by the Banco Nacional da Habitação (National Housing Bank, BNH).
