= Parque Anchieta =

- Neighborhood
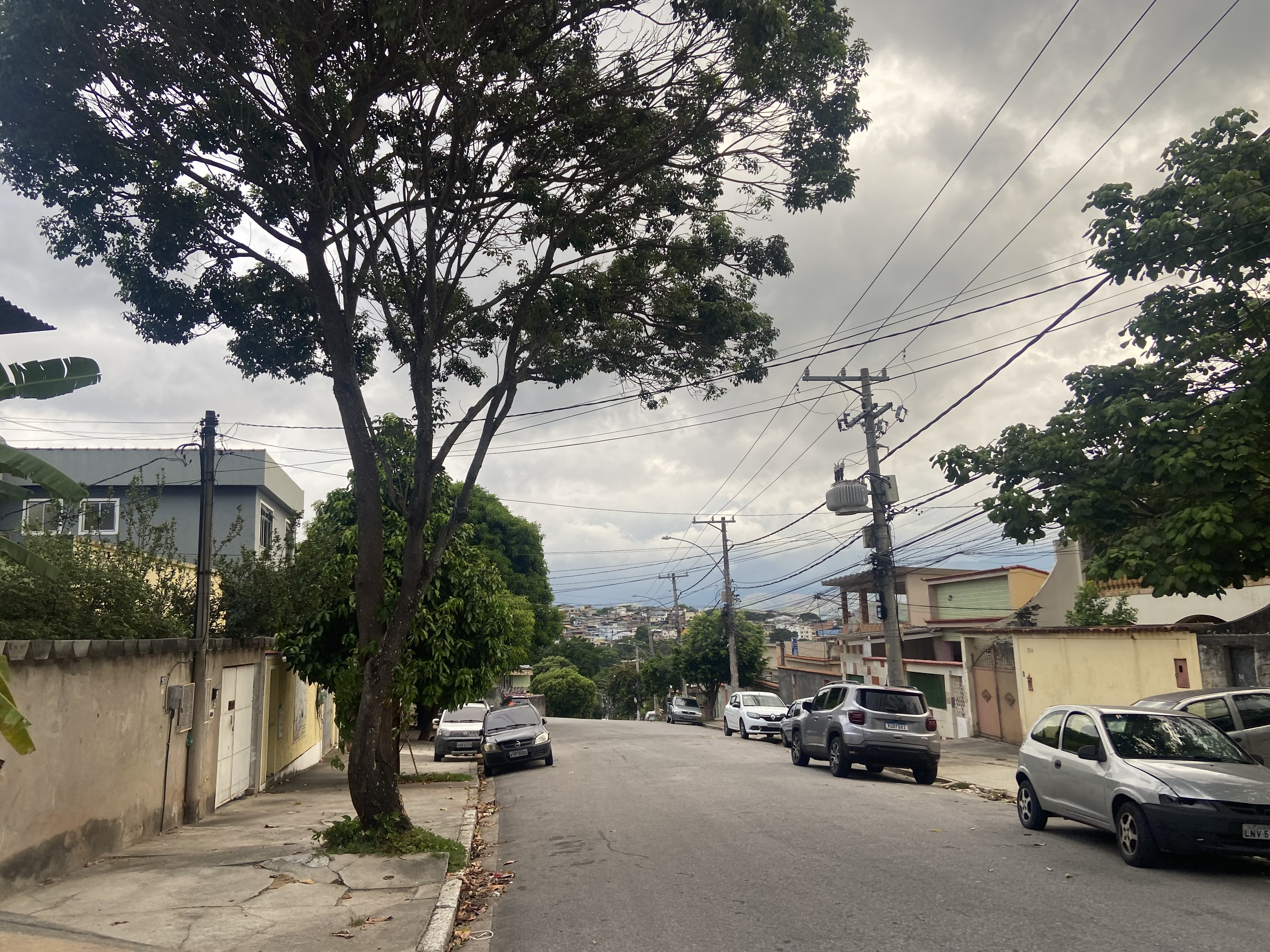
- Interactive map of Parque Anchieta
- Coordinates: 22°50′10″S 43°24′54″W
- Country: Brazil
- State: Rio de Janeiro (RJ)
- Municipality/City: Rio de Janeiro
- Zone: North Zone
- Administrative region: Anchieta

Area
  - Total: 390.58 ha (965.1 acres)

Population (2010)
  - Total: 26,212
  - Density: 6,711.0/km^{2} (17,382/sq mi)

Parque Anchieta is a neighborhood in the North Zone of Rio de Janeiro, Brazil.
