= Ribeira, Rio de Janeiro =

Ribeira
- Neighborhood
- Location in Rio de Janeiro Ribeira (Brazil)
- Coordinates: 22°49′29″S 43°10′10″W
- Country: Brazil
- State: Rio de Janeiro (RJ)
- Municipality/City: Rio de Janeiro
- Zone: North Zone

Ribeira is a neighborhood in the North Zone of Rio de Janeiro, Brazil.
