= Cacuia =

- Neighborhood
- Location in Rio de Janeiro Cacuia (Brazil)
- Coordinates: 22°49′19″S 43°11′02″W
- Country: Brazil
- State: Rio de Janeiro (RJ)
- Municipality/City: Rio de Janeiro
- Zone: North Zone

Population (2010)
  - Total: 11,013

Cacuia is a neighborhood in the North Zone of Rio de Janeiro, Brazil.
