= Senador Vasconcelos =

- Neighborhood
- Location in Rio de Janeiro Senador Vasconcelos (Brazil)
- Coordinates: 22°53′44″S 43°31′39″W
- Country: Brazil
- State: Rio de Janeiro (RJ)
- Municipality/City: Rio de Janeiro
- Zone: West Zone

Population (2010)
  - Total: 30,600

Senador Vasconcelos is a neighborhood in the West Zone of Rio de Janeiro, Brazil.

== Neighborhood statistics ==
- Total area (2003): 644.18 hectares.
- Total population (2010): 30,600
- Total of domiciles (2010): 9,826
- Administrative region: XVIII - Campo Grande.
