= Governador Island =

Island in Brazil

Native name: Ilha do Governador
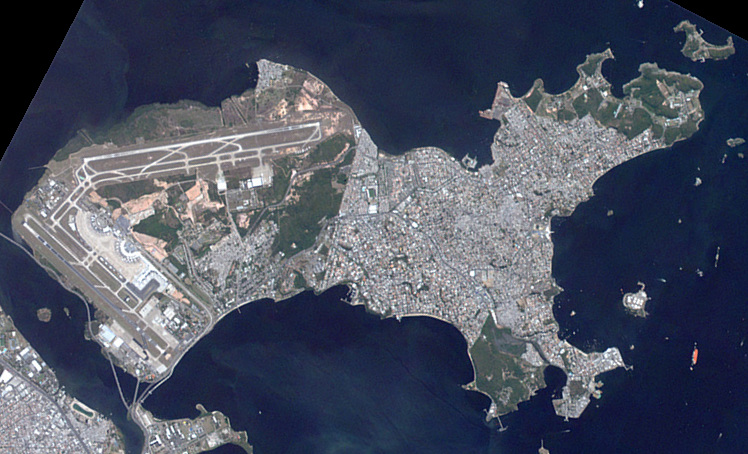
- August 2016 satellite image

- Location within Rio de Janeiro

Geography
- Location: Guanabara Bay
- Coordinates: 22°48′21″S 43°12′37″W
- Area: 36.12 km^{2} (13.95 sq mi)

Administration
- Brazil
- State: Rio de Janeiro
- Municipality: Rio de Janeiro
- Zone: North Zone
- Administrative Region: Ilha do Governador

Demographics
- Population: 211,018
- Pop. density: 5,806.56/km^{2} (15038.92/sq mi)

Governador Island (Ilha do Governador, in Portuguese; literally Governor's Island, in English) is the largest island in Guanabara Bay, in Rio de Janeiro, Brazil. It has a population of about 211,018 inhabitants, in a small area of 42 km^{2} (16 sq mi).

Rio de Janeiro's main airport, Galeão - Antônio Carlos Jobim International Airport, and the Galeão Air Force Base are located on Governador Island and occupy about a third of it, in the western and northwestern parts. A small sea inlet that once existed on the northwestern shore was landfilled to build the airport's runway 10/28, thereby increasing the island's area.

Often mentioned by cariocas (inhabitants of Rio city) simply as Ilha ("island"), Governador Island has some favelas, such as Morro do Dendê, the largest one, but it also has many middle-class neighborhoods, like Jardim Guanabara, with the third highest HDI in the city. The island is connected to Fundão Island and to the mainland by a complex of expressway bridges and through a ferry in Cocotá Terminal, transporting passengers to downtown Rio.

The name means "Governor's Island" because one of the first colonial governors of Brazil built a country house on the island in the 16th century. The native name for the island in Old Tupi was Paranapuã, which means "sea branch".

People from Governador Island suffer from high pollution from Guanabara Bay. Although surrounded by beaches, many of them have become unusable even though the bay has been cleaned up in recent years for the 2016 Summer Olympics.

The island is home to only one professional football club, A.A. Portuguesa. Its home is Estádio Luso Brasileiro, which in recent years has been expanded so it can be used professionally by Botafogo, as Estádio Olímpico João Havelange, its normal home, is being used for Olympic purposes. It was also used by Flamengo during 2017 and 2018, in the time being called Ilha do Urubu.

== Etymology ==
Discovered in 1502 by Portuguese navigators, the Temiminó people were its inhabitants at the time. They called it "Ilha de Paranapuã", a term meaning "hill of the sea", from the combination of paranã ("sea") and apuã ("hill"), and it was also called "Ilha dos Maracajás" (a species of large felids, then abundant in the region; "Maracajá" was also another name used for the Temiminó people who inhabited the island) by the Tamoios, enemies of the Temiminós. The name "Ilha do Governador" arose on September 5, 1567, when the governor-general of the then State of Brazil (and interim governor of the Captaincy of Rio de Janeiro) Mem de Sá donated to his nephew, Salvador Correia de Sá (the Elder – Governor and Captain-General of the Royal Captaincy of Rio de Janeiro from 1568 to 1572), more than half of its territory. Correia de Sá, future governor of the captaincy, turned it into an estate where sugarcane was cultivated, with a sugar mill for the production of sugar, exported to Europe in the 16th, 17th and 18th centuries.

== Neighborhoods ==
In July 1981, the then mayor Júlio Coutinho approved a law that effectively divided Governador Island in fourteen different new neighborhoods: Bancários, Cacuia, Cocotá, Galeão, Jardim Carioca, Jardim Guanabara, Moneró, Pitangueiras, Portuguesa, Praia da Bandeira, Ribeira, Tauá and Zumbi.

== Literature and art ==
The region has a public library in the Cocotá neighborhood with free access for all, as well as the Renato Russo Cultural Tent (Lona Cultural Renato Russo), a venue for various artistic expressions located in the same neighborhood. In the Jardim Guanabara neighborhood lies the area of Praia da Bica, a popular spot with several event venues and gatherings among younger people. The region was also home to the Casa de Cultura Elbe de Holanda, the last cultural center in Rio de Janeiro to close, in 2013.

== Transport ==
=== Cycle paths ===
The island has about 62 km of cycle paths and bike lanes, most of them shared lanes.
