= Costa Barros =

- Neighborhood
- Location in Rio de Janeiro Costa Barros (Brazil)
- Coordinates: 22°49′27″S 43°21′56″W
- Country: Brazil
- State: Rio de Janeiro (RJ)
- Municipality/City: Rio de Janeiro
- Zone: North Zone

Population (2010)
  - Total: 28,442

Costa Barros is a neighborhood in the North Zone of Rio de Janeiro, Brazil.
