= Pitangueiras, Rio de Janeiro =

Pitangueiras
- Neighborhood
- Location in Rio de Janeiro Pitangueiras (Brazil)
- Coordinates: 22°49′03″S 43°10′49″W
- Country: Brazil
- State: Rio de Janeiro (RJ)
- Municipality/City: Rio de Janeiro
- Zone: North Zone

Population (2010)
  - Total: 11,756

Pitangueiras is a neighborhood in the North Zone of Rio de Janeiro, Brazil.
