= Anchieta, Rio de Janeiro =

Anchieta
- Neighborhood
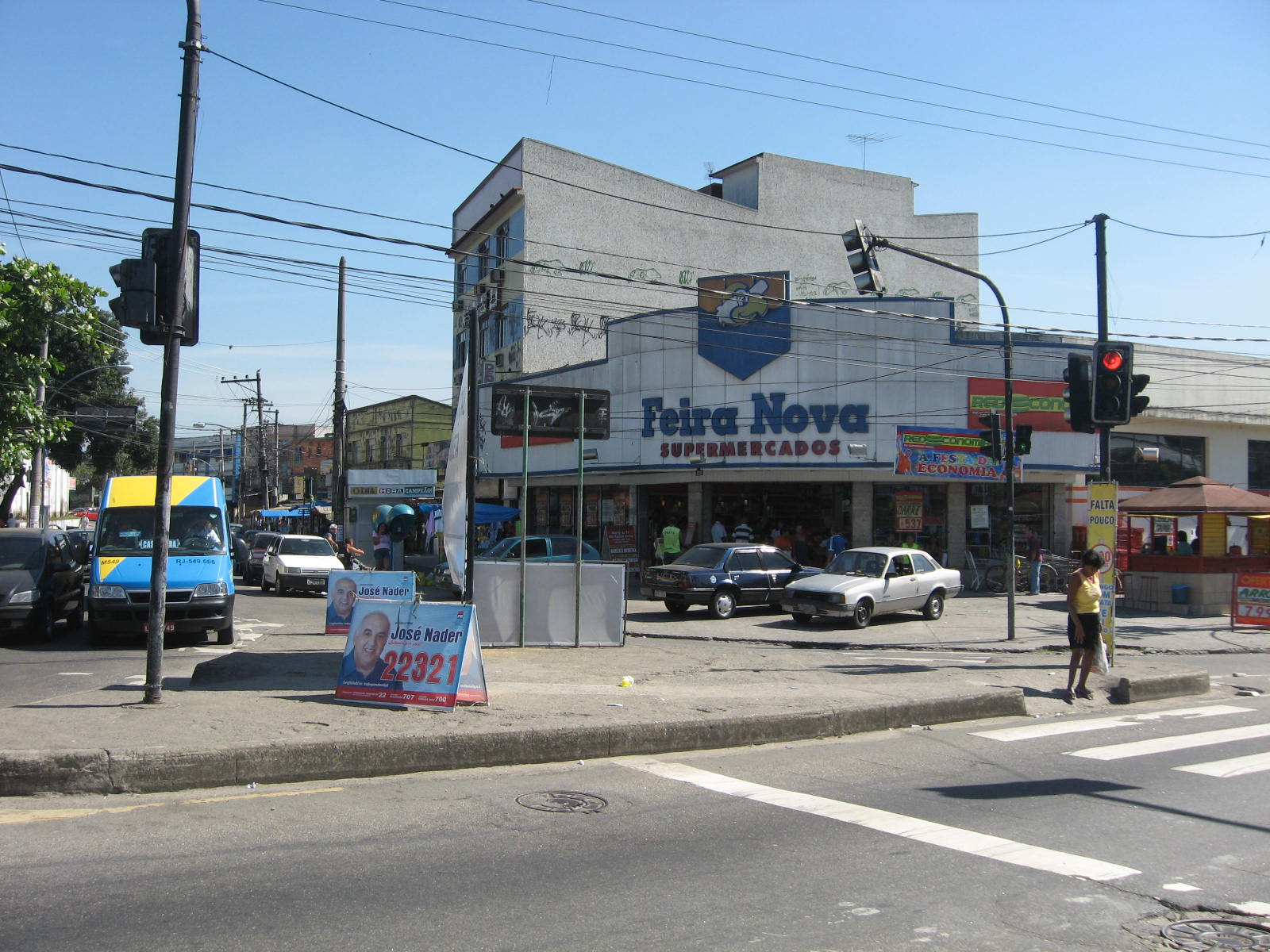

- Location in Rio de Janeiro Anchieta (Brazil)
- Coordinates: 22°49′16″S 43°23′45″W
- Country: Brazil
- State: Rio de Janeiro (RJ)
- Municipality/City: Rio de Janeiro
- Zone: North Zone

Anchieta is a neighborhood in the North Zone of Rio de Janeiro, Brazil, with an area of 409,691 km^{2} and a population of 29,984 people. It saw a significant increase in its IDHM in the past few decades, going from 0.472 in 1991 to 0.730 in 2010, and it is known for its education of residents, registered at 99.1%.
