= Coelho Neto Station =

Metro station in Rio de Janeiro, Brazil

Coelho Neto
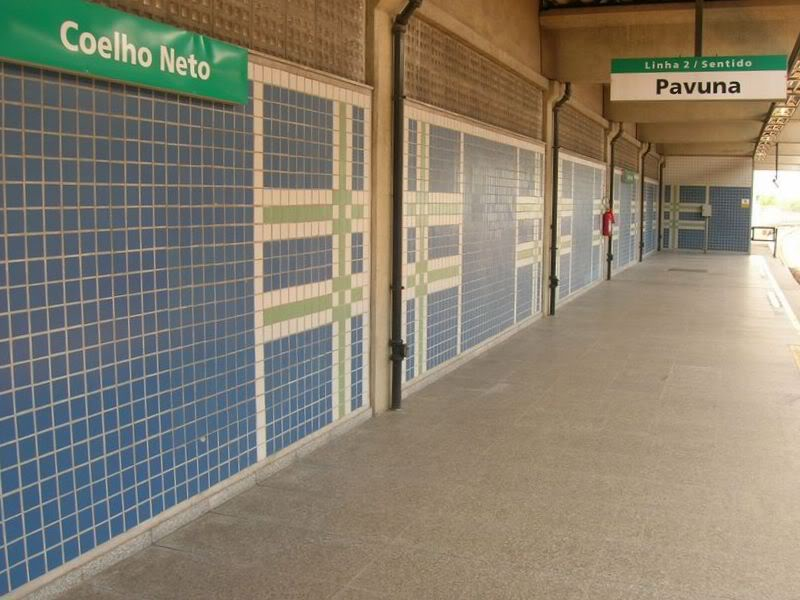
- Platform at Coelho Neto Station

General information
- Location: Coelho Neto, Rio de Janeiro; Brazil
- Coordinates: 22.8317337°S 43.3438421°W
- Operator: Metrô Rio
- Line: Line 2

Other information
- Station code: CNT

History
- Opened: 1998; 28 years ago

Services
Preceding station	Rio de Janeiro Metro	Following station
Acari/Fazenda Botafogo towards Pavuna	Line 2	Colégio towards Botafogo
Location
- Location within Rio de Janeiro

Coelho Neto Station (Portuguese: Estação Coelho Neto) is a subway station on the Rio de Janeiro Metro that services the neighbourhoods of Coelho Neto and Irajá in the North Zone of Rio de Janeiro.
