= Acari/Fazenda Botafogo Station =

Metro station in Rio de Janeiro, Brazil

Acari/Fazenda Botafogo
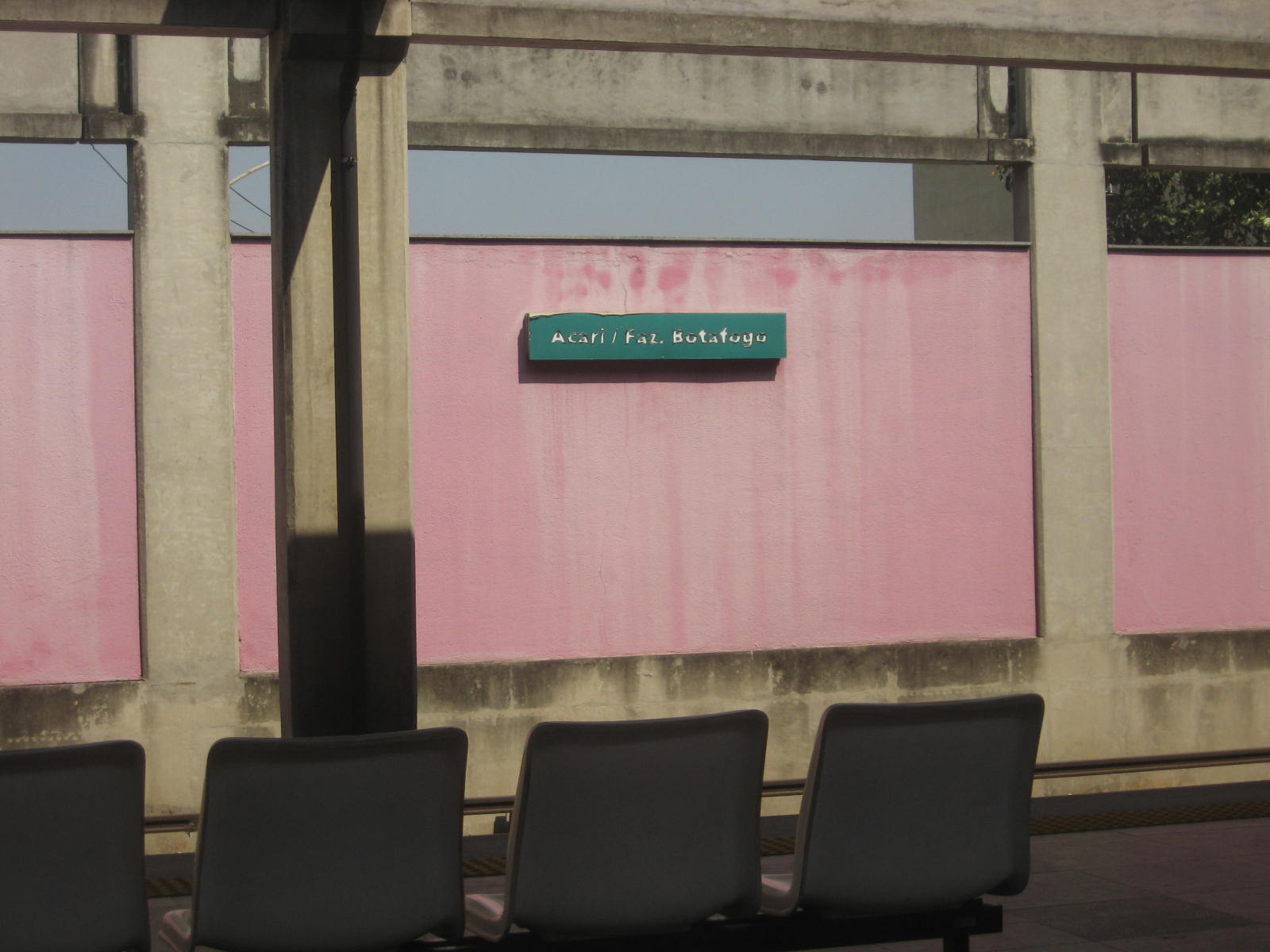
- Platform at Acari/Fazenda Botafogo Station in 2010

General information
- Location: Rio de Janeiro; Brazil
- Coordinates: 22.825771°S 43.3493782°W
- Operator: Metrô Rio
- Line: Line 2

Other information
- Station code: AFB

History
- Opened: 1998; 28 years ago

Services
Preceding station	Rio de Janeiro Metro	Following station
Engenheiro Rubens Paiva towards Pavuna	Line 2	Coelho Neto towards Botafogo
Location
- Location within Rio de Janeiro

Acari/Fazenda Botafogo Station (Portuguese: Estação Acari/Fazenda Botafogo) is a subway station on the Rio de Janeiro Metro that services the neighbourhoods of Acari and Coelho Neto in the North Zone of Rio de Janeiro.
