= Siqueira Campos Station =

Metro station in Rio de Janeiro, Brazil

Siqueira Campos / Copacabana
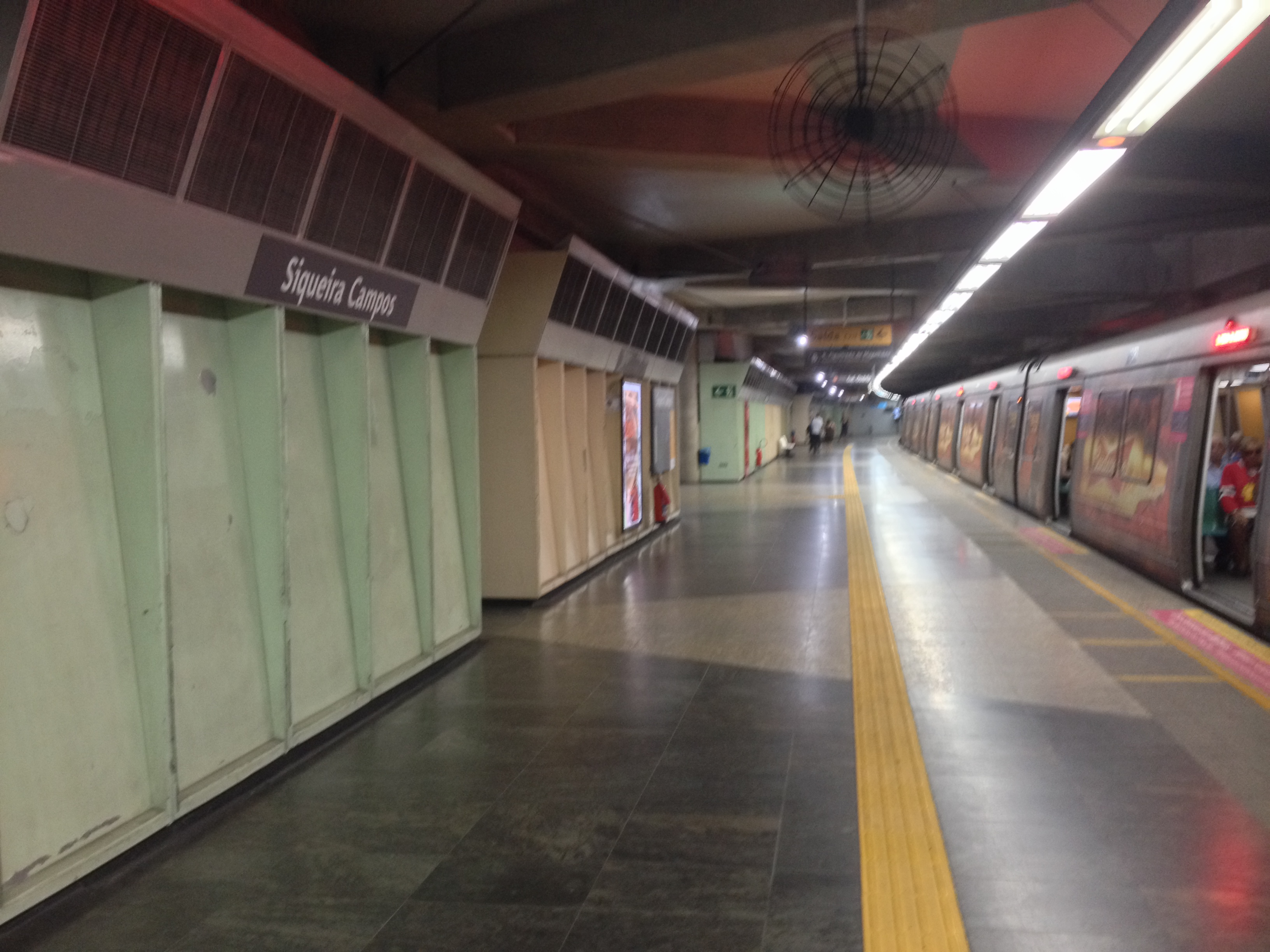

General information
- Location: Rua Tonelero; Copacabana, Rio de Janeiro; Brazil
- Coordinates: 22.967538°S 43.187357°W
- Operator: Metrô Rio
- Line: Line 1

Other information
- Station code: SCP

History
- Opened: 2002; 24 years ago

Services
Preceding station	Rio de Janeiro Metro	Following station
Cardeal Arcoverde towards Uruguai	Line 1	Cantagalo towards General Osório
Location
- Location within Rio de Janeiro

Siqueira Campos / Copacabana Station (Portuguese: Estação Siqueira Campos / Copacabana) is a subway station on the Rio de Janeiro Metro that services the neighbourhood of Copacabana in the South Zone of Rio de Janeiro. It is one of the busiest stations in the city, with an average daily flux of 76000 passengers.
