= Inhaúma Station =

Metro station in Rio de Janeiro, Brazil

Inhaúma
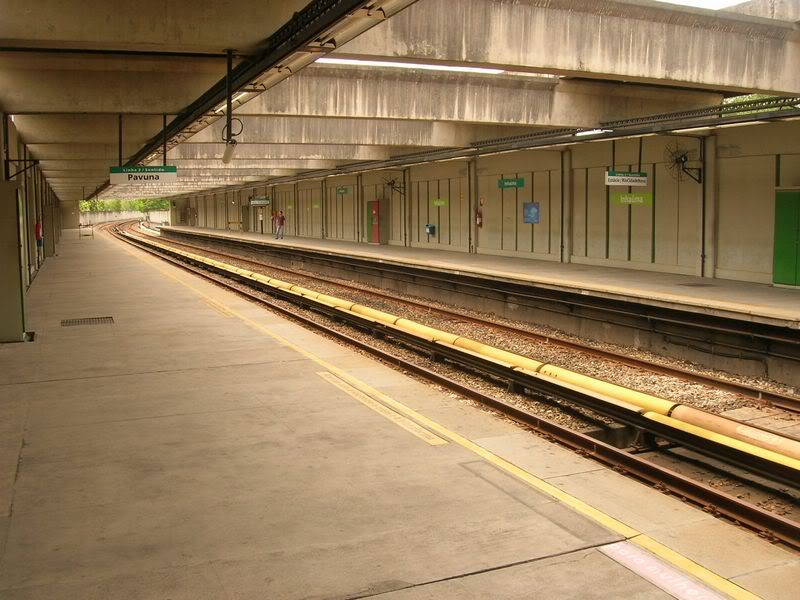
- Inhaúma Station

General information
- Location: Avenida Pastor Martin Luther King Jr; Rio de Janeiro; Brazil
- Coordinates: 22.874567°S 43.283428°W
- Operator: Metrô Rio
- Line: Line 2

Other information
- Station code: INH

History
- Opened: 1983; 43 years ago

Services
Preceding station	Rio de Janeiro Metro	Following station
Engenho da Rainha towards Pavuna	Line 2	Nova América/Del Castilho towards Botafogo
Location
- Location within Rio de Janeiro

Inhaúma Station (Portuguese: Estação Inhaúma) is a subway station on the Rio de Janeiro Metro that services the neighbourhood of Inhaúma in the North Zone of Rio de Janeiro. It is located near the Inhaúma Cemetery.
