= Colégio Station =

Metro station in Rio de Janeiro, Brazil

Colégio
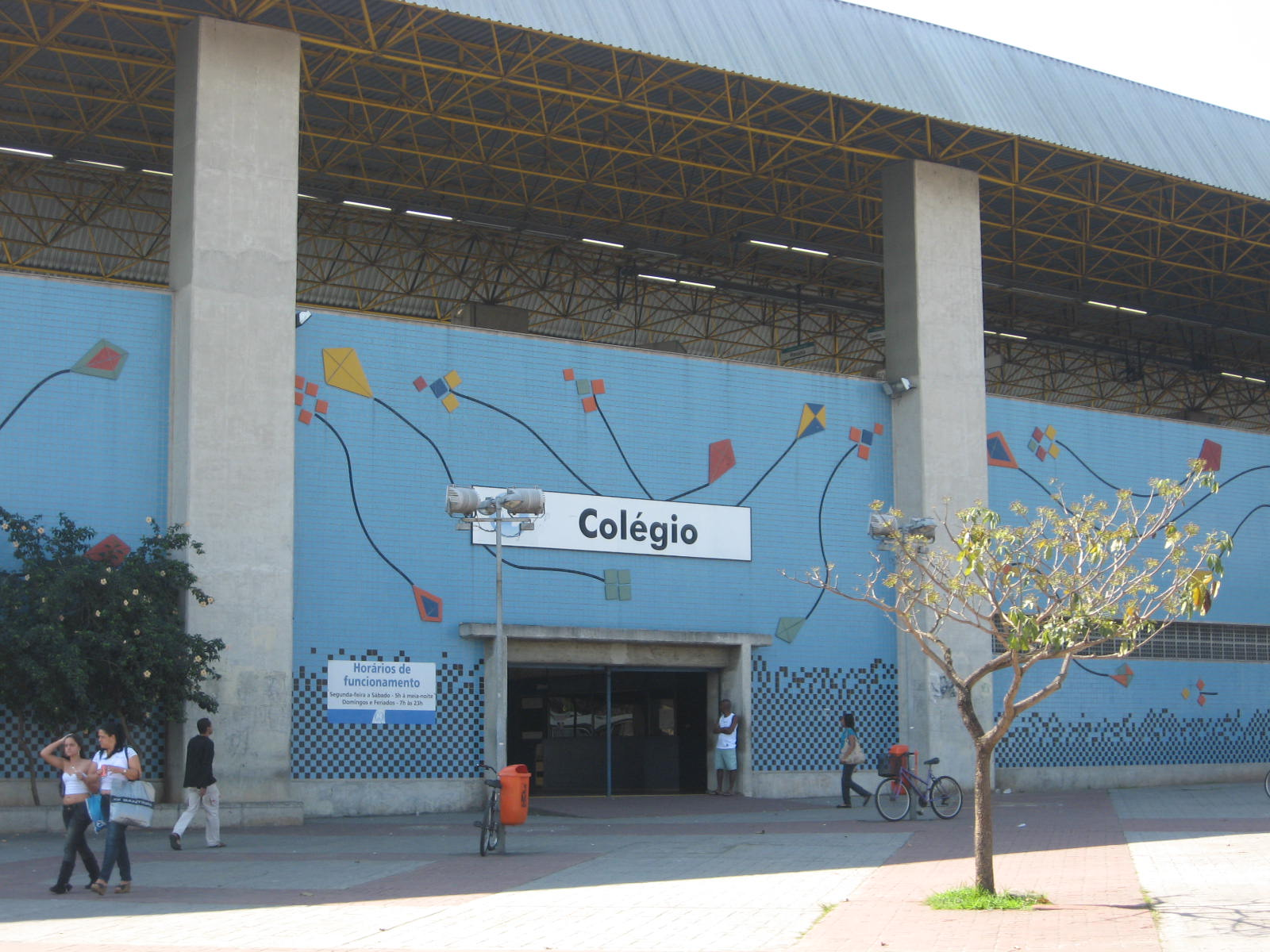
- Colégio Station entrance

General information
- Location: Colégio, Rio de Janeiro; Brazil
- Coordinates: 22.8418548°S 43.334819°W
- Operator: Metrô Rio
- Line: Line 2

Other information
- Station code: CLG

History
- Opened: 1998; 28 years ago

Services
Preceding station	Rio de Janeiro Metro	Following station
Coelho Neto towards Pavuna	Line 2	Irajá towards Botafogo
Location
- Location within Rio de Janeiro

Colégio Station (Portuguese: Estação Colégio) is a subway station on the Rio de Janeiro Metro that services the neighbourhood of Colégio in the North Zone of Rio de Janeiro.
