= Cantagalo Station =

Metro station in Rio de Janeiro, Brazil

Cantagalo / Copacabana
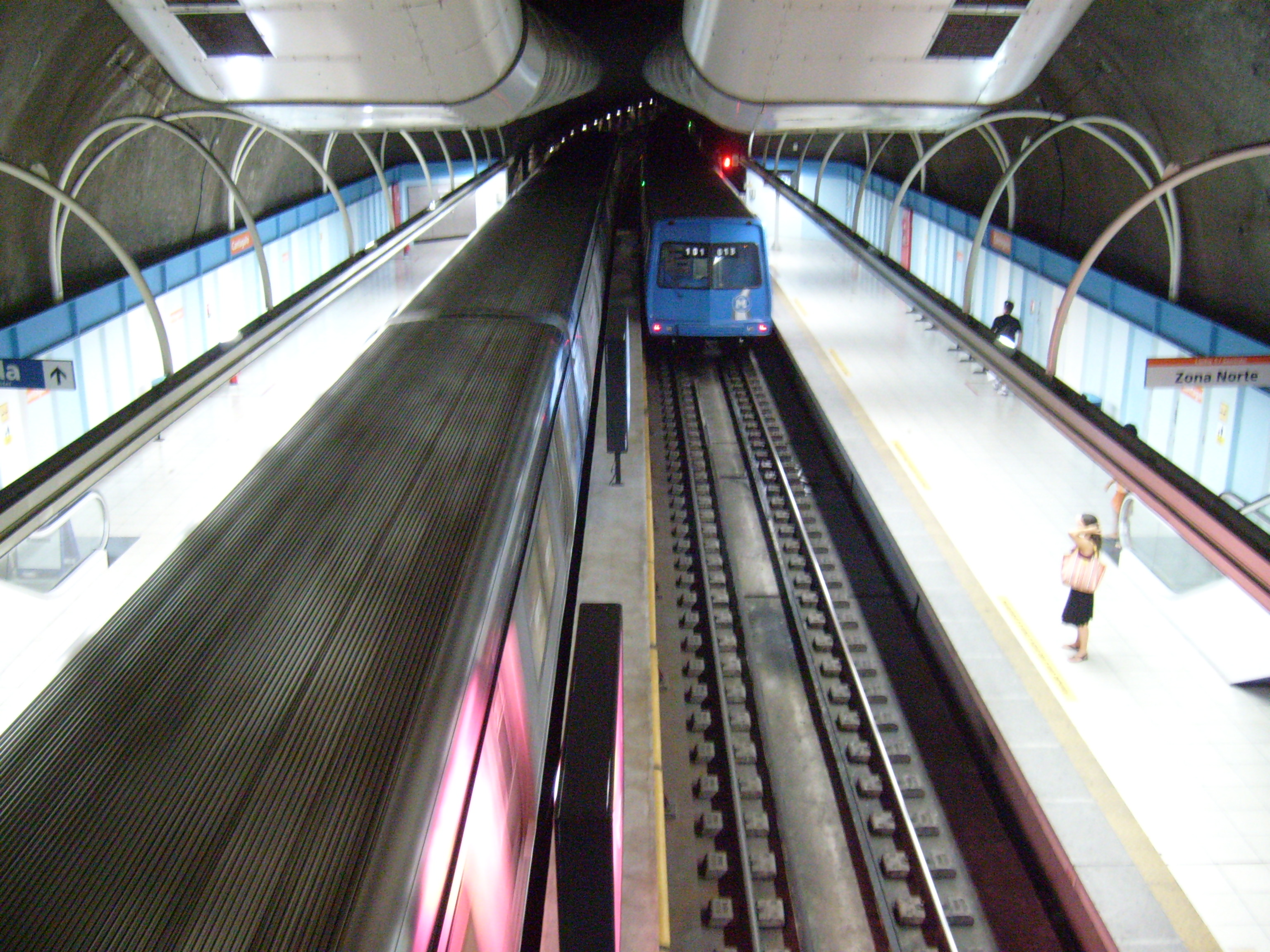

General information
- Coordinates: 22°58′35″S 43°11′38″W
- Platforms: Side platforms
- Tracks: 2

Construction
- Parking: No
- Cycle facilities: Yes
- Accessible: Yes

History
- Opened: 2007; 19 years ago

Services
Preceding station	Rio de Janeiro Metro	Following station
Siqueira Campos towards Uruguai	Line 1	General Osório Terminus
Location
- Location within Rio de Janeiro

Cantagalo / Copacabana Station is a station on Line 1 of the Rio de Janeiro Metro located in the Copacabana borough of Rio de Janeiro, Brazil. The station was opened in 2007.

== Nearby locations ==
- Parque do Corte do Cantagalo
- Lagoa Rodrigo de Freitas
- Praia de Copacabana
- Cinema Roxy
