= Triagem Station =

Metro station in Rio de Janeiro, Brazil

Triagem
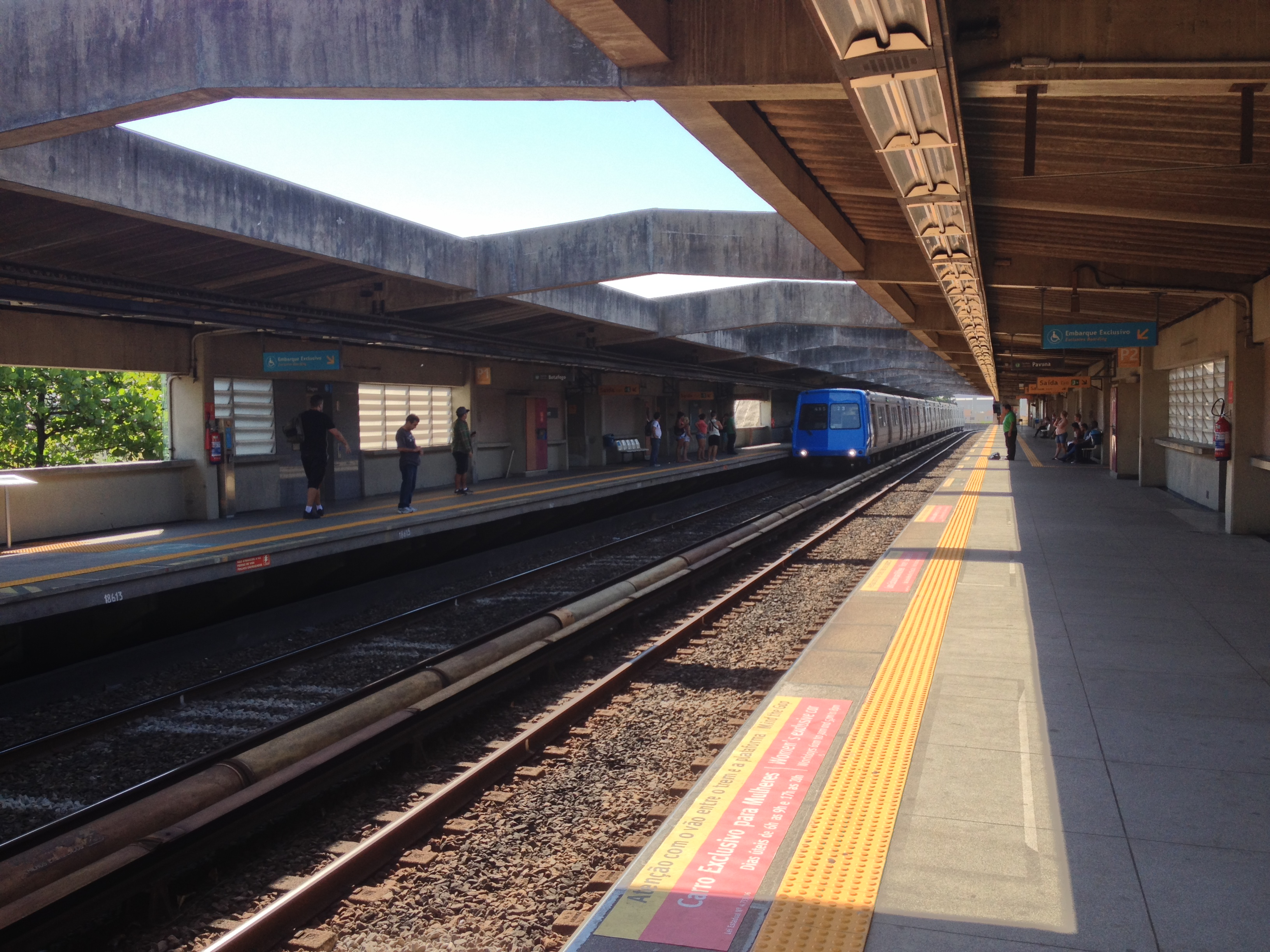
- Estação Triagem (Metrô Rio)

General information
- Location: Rocha, Rio de Janeiro; Brazil
- Coordinates: 22.8969453°S 43.2444389°W
- Operator: Metrô Rio
- Line: Line 2

Other information
- Station code: TRG

History
- Opened: 1988; 38 years ago

Services
Preceding station	Rio de Janeiro Metro	Following station
Maria da Graça towards Pavuna	Line 2	Maracanã towards Botafogo
Location
- Location within Rio de Janeiro

Triagem Station (Portuguese: Estação Triagem) is a subway station on the Rio de Janeiro Metro that services the neighbourhood of Rocha in the North Zone of Rio de Janeiro.
