= Engenho da Rainha Station =

Metro station in Rio de Janeiro, Brazil

Engenho da Rainha
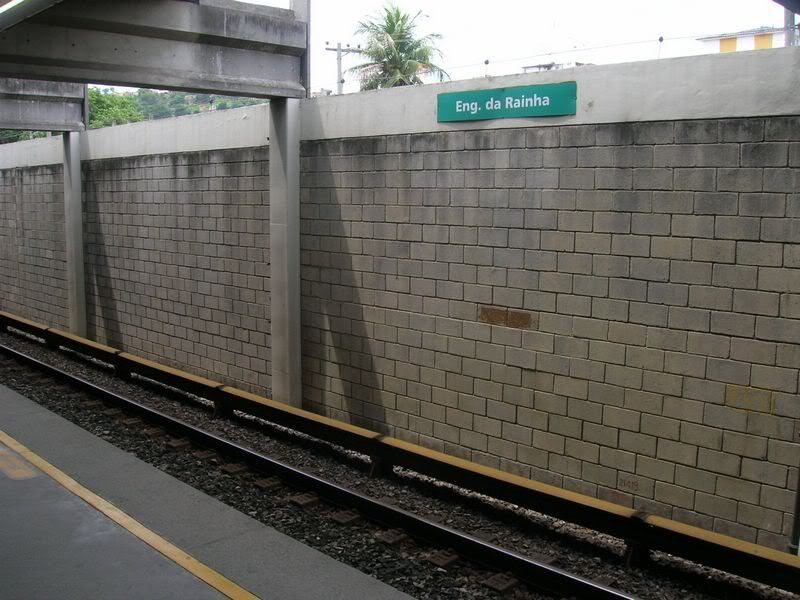
- Wall opposite platform at Engenho da Rainha

General information
- Location: Tijuca, Rio de Janeiro; Brazil
- Coordinates: 22.8678958°S 43.2974496°W
- Operator: Metrô Rio
- Line: Line 2

Other information
- Station code: ERN

History
- Opened: 1991; 35 years ago

Services
Preceding station	Rio de Janeiro Metro	Following station
Thomaz Coelho towards Pavuna	Line 2	Inhaúma towards Botafogo
Location
- Location within Rio de Janeiro

Engenho da Rainha Station (Portuguese: Estação Engenho da Rainha) is a subway station on the Rio de Janeiro Metro that services the neighbourhood of Engenho da Rainha in the North Zone of Rio de Janeiro.
