= Maria da Graça Station =

Metro station in Rio de Janeiro, Brazil

Maria da Graça
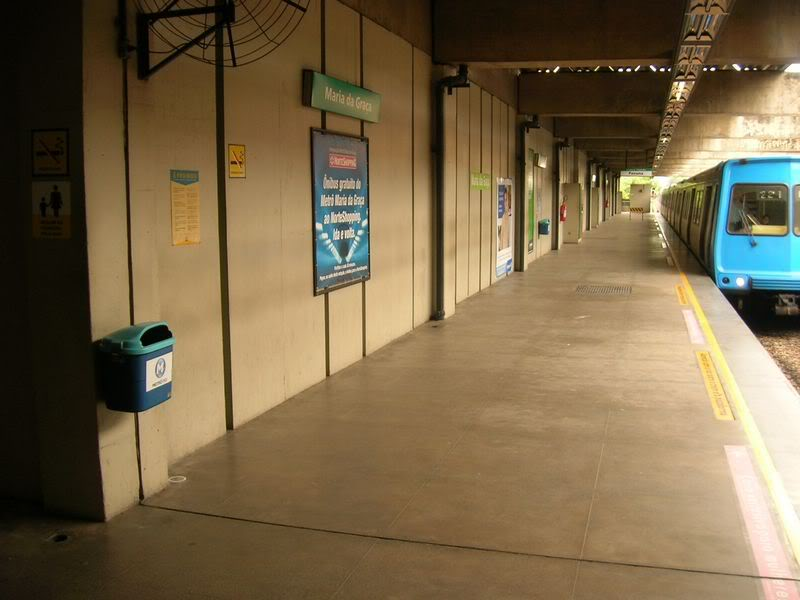
- Entrance to Maria da Graça station

General information
- Location: Rio de Janeiro; Brazil
- Coordinates: 22.881167°S 43.260359°W
- Operator: Metrô Rio
- Line: Line 2

Other information
- Station code: MGR

History
- Opened: 1983; 43 years ago

Services
Preceding station	Rio de Janeiro Metro	Following station
Nova América/Del Castilho towards Pavuna	Line 2	Triagem towards Botafogo
Location
- Location within Rio de Janeiro

Maria da Graça Station (Portuguese: Estação Maria da Graça) is a subway station on the Rio de Janeiro Metro that services the neighbourhood of Maria da Graça in the North Zone of Rio de Janeiro.
