= Rio de Janeiro Metro =

Rapid transit network serving Rio de Janeiro, Brazil

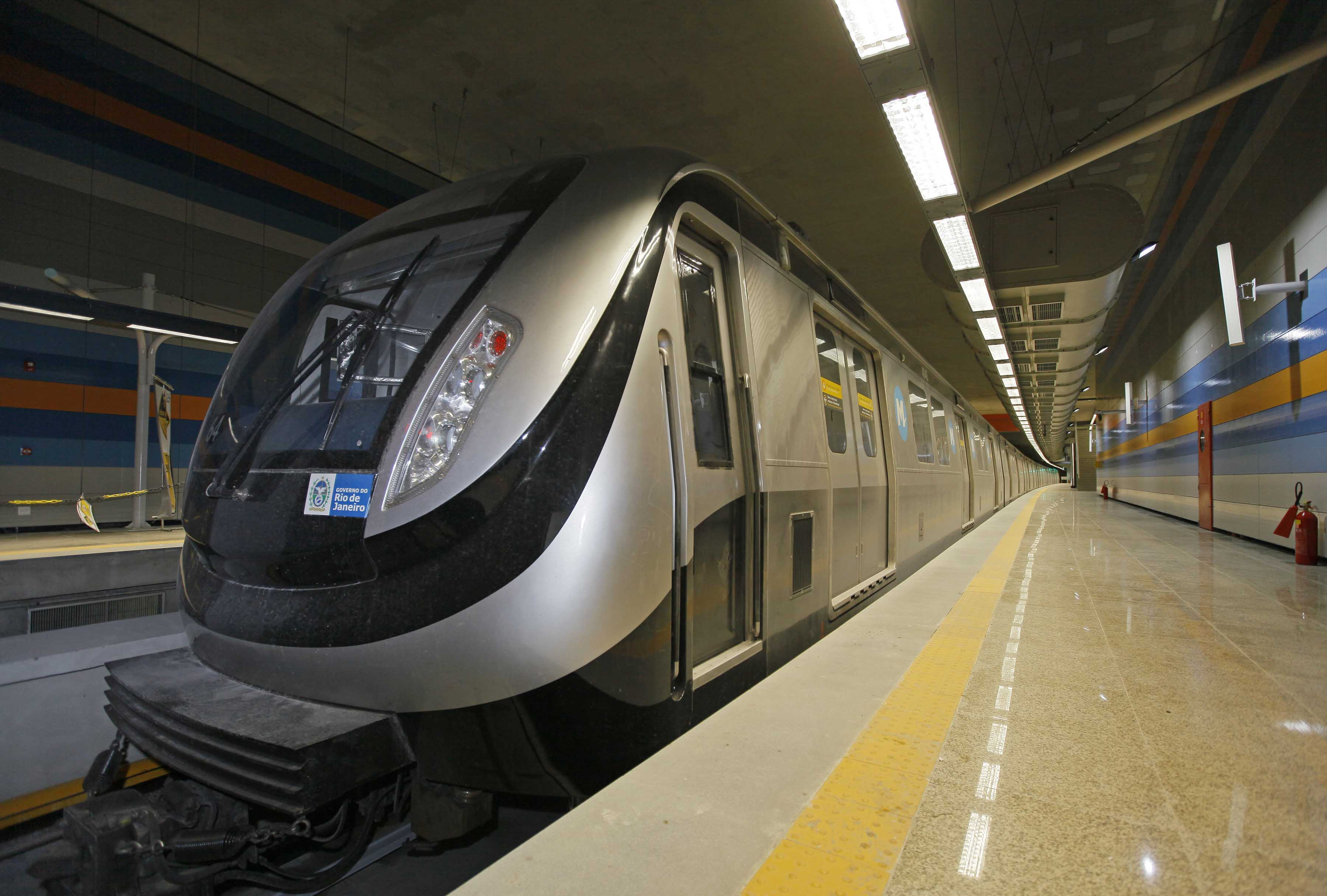
- Antero de Quental / Leblon Station

Overview
- Native name: Metrô do Rio de Janeiro
- Owner: Rio Trilhos (State of Rio de Janeiro)
- Locale: Rio de Janeiro, RJ, Brazil
- Transit type: Rapid transit
- Number of lines: 2
- Number of stations: 41
- Daily ridership: 498 401 (2024)
- Annual ridership: 182.4 million (2024)
- Website: metrorio.com.br

Operation
- Began operation: 5 March 1979; 47 years ago
- Operator: Concessão Metroviária do Rio de Janeiro S.A. (Mubadala Investment Company)
- Train length: 6 cars

Technical
- System length: 58 km (36 mi)
- Track gauge: 1,600 mm (5 ft 3 in)
- Electrification: 750 V DC third rail
- Top speed: 100 km/h (62 mph)
System map

The Rio de Janeiro Metro (Portuguese: Metrô do Rio de Janeiro, Portuguese pronunciation: [meˌtɾo du ˈʁi.u dʒi ʒɐˈnejɾu]), commonly referred to as just the Metrô (Portuguese pronunciation: [meˈtɾo]) is a rapid transit network that serves the city of Rio de Janeiro, Brazil. The Metrô was inaugurated on 5 March 1979, and consisted of five stations operating on a single line. The system currently covers a total of 58 kilometres (36 mi), and serves 41 stations.

The metro system is nominally divided into three lines but, because Lines 1 and 4 are operationally the same line, it effectively operates as two: Line 1/4 is 32 kilometres (20 mi) long and runs from Uruguai / Tijuca station in Tijuca to Jardim Oceânico / Barra da Tijuca station in Jardim Oceânico; Line 2 is 30.2 kilometres (18.8 mi) long and runs from Pavuna station in Pavuna to Botafogo station in Botafogo. Line 1/4 shares track with Line 2 between Central and Botafogo, a stretch that includes 10 stations and approximately 5 km (3.1 mi) of track. The Rio de Janeiro metro has the second highest metro passenger volume in Brazil after the São Paulo Metro.

Line 1/4 serves Tijuca, the city center, the South Zone and the eastern tip of Barra da Tijuca. It is a semicircular line, and is almost fully underground. Line 2 serves working-class residential neighborhoods in the North Zone, as well as the city centre and part of the South Zone. It is a northwest-to-southeast line, and the non-shared portion is almost completely above-ground (mostly at-grade and partly elevated); the section of the line that interlines with Line 1/4 is entirely underground. This line started as a pre-metro on top of an old abandoned railway line, but due to increasing numbers of commuters, it was converted to metro.

The Government of the State of Rio de Janeiro is responsible for the expansion of the metro network through Rio Trilhos; however, the operation and maintenance of the system was contracted out to Metrô Rio in 1998 with a 20 year lease. In late December 2007, the lease was renewed until 2038 and Metrô Rio assumed responsibility for the construction of Cidade Nova Station, interlining Lines 1 and 2, the purchase of 114 cars and the construction of Uruguai Station, extending Line 1 further north. In 2021, Mubadala acquired majority control of Metrô Rio. In 2025, the lease was further extended to 2048 in exchange for Metrô Rio finishing the construction of Gávea Station.

== History ==
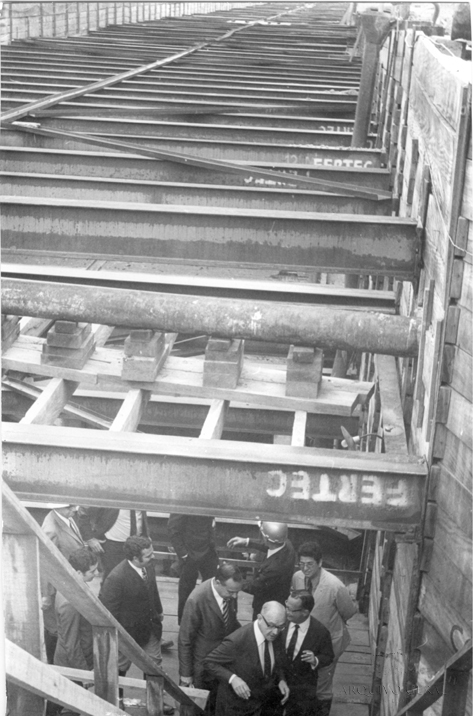
Rio de Janeiro Metro construction

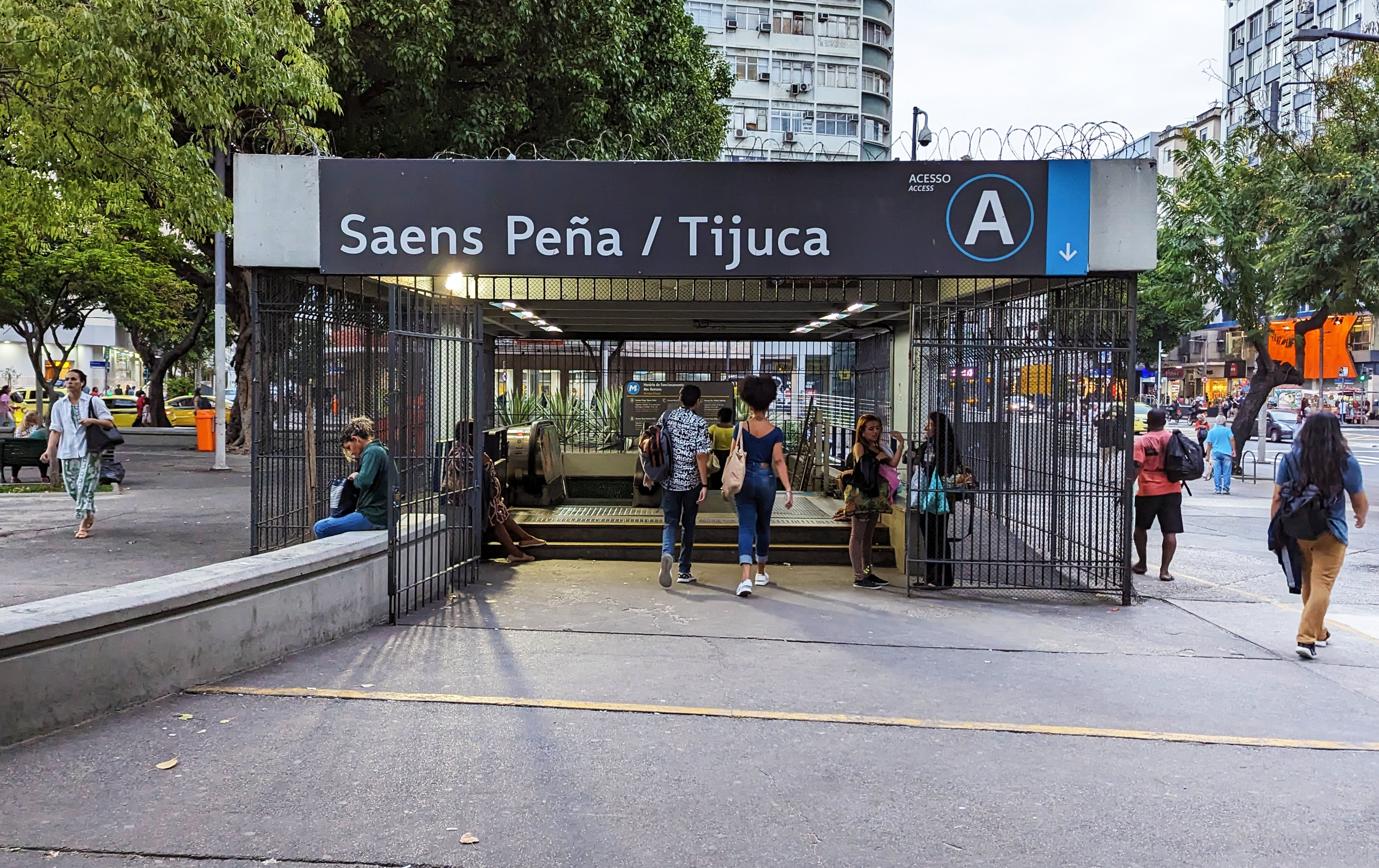
Saens Peña Station entrance

In the middle of the 20th century, Rio de Janeiro was the largest city in Brazil and was quickly growing, in large part due to urban industrialization and the migration of rural workers from the Northeast. At the same time, with the explosive growth of the Brazilian car industry, the number of motor vehicles on the streets was quickly overwhelming the city, then reliant on its streetcar, bus and suburban rail networks. By the early 1960s, traffic jams, pollution, and overcrowded public transport had become serious problems in the city, which were made worse by the dismantling of the streetcar network in 1964. To overcome these problems, the local government decided to build a metro network.

On 14 December 1968, the Companhia do Metropolitano do Rio de Janeiro (Metro Company of Rio de Janeiro) was created through State Law number 1736. On 23 June 1970, construction work started in Praça Paris using the cut-and-cover method. The Rio de Janeiro Metro began operating on 5 March 1979. In the beginning, there were only five stations, all on Line 1: Praça Onze, Central, Presidente Vargas, Cinelândia, and Glória, operating from 9:00 AM to 3:00 PM. In its initial 10 days, the system transported more than half a million people, averaging sixty thousand passengers per day. At that time, the subway worked with only four trains of four cars each, with an average interval of eight minutes. In December of the same year, the operating schedule was extended until 11:00 PM, including Saturdays. In 1980, the metro system began to be expanded with the opening of Uruguaiana and Estácio stations. The two new stations caused larger passenger demand, compelling an increase in the number of trains from four to six. Carioca Station in the city centre was finished in January 1981. By the end of the same year, Catete, Largo do Machado, Flamengo (originally called Morro Azul) and Botafogo stations were completed. In 1982, the metro was extended to Tijuca, with the openings of Afonso Pena, São Francisco Xavier and Saens Peña stations.

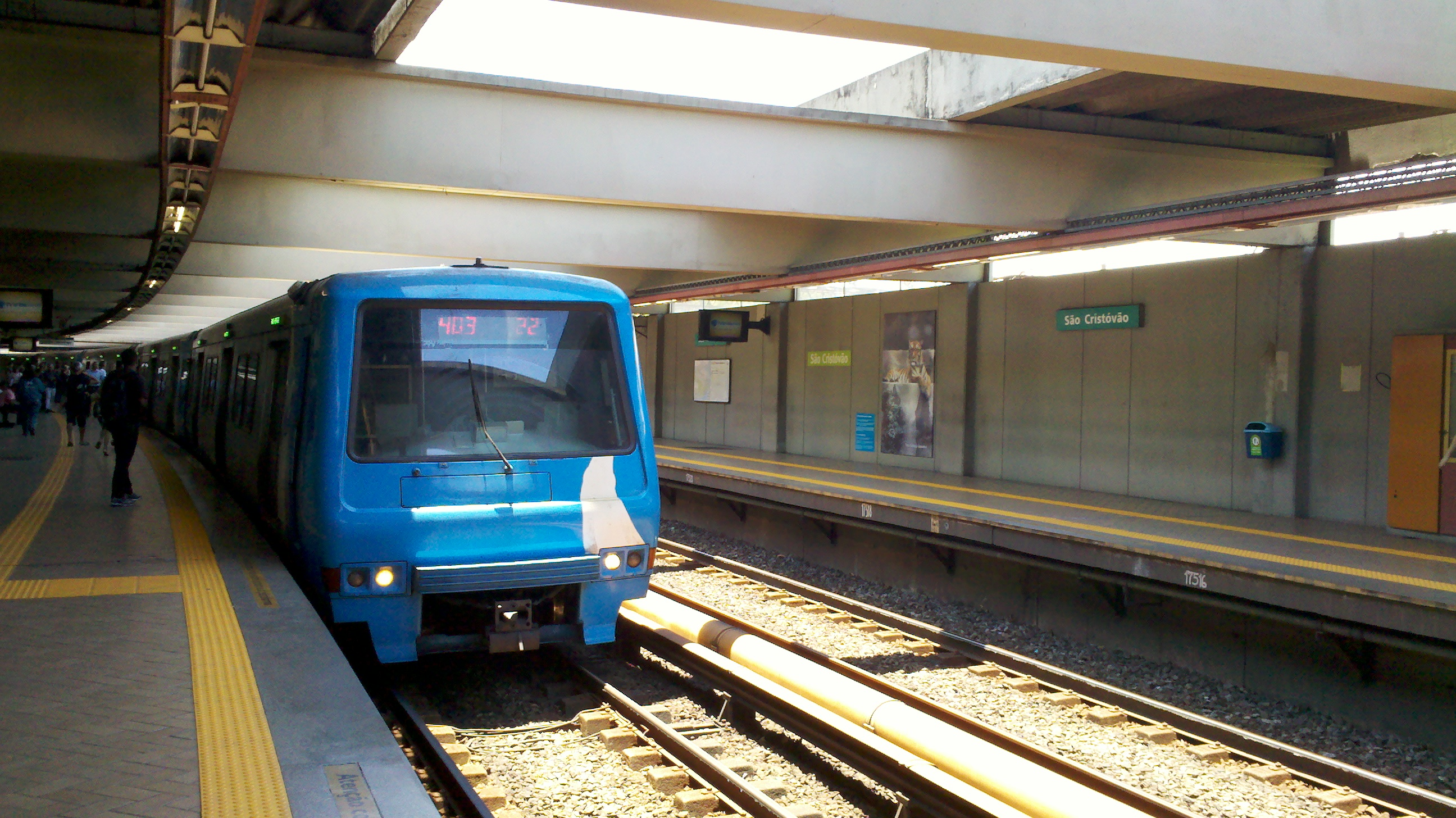
São Cristóvão Station

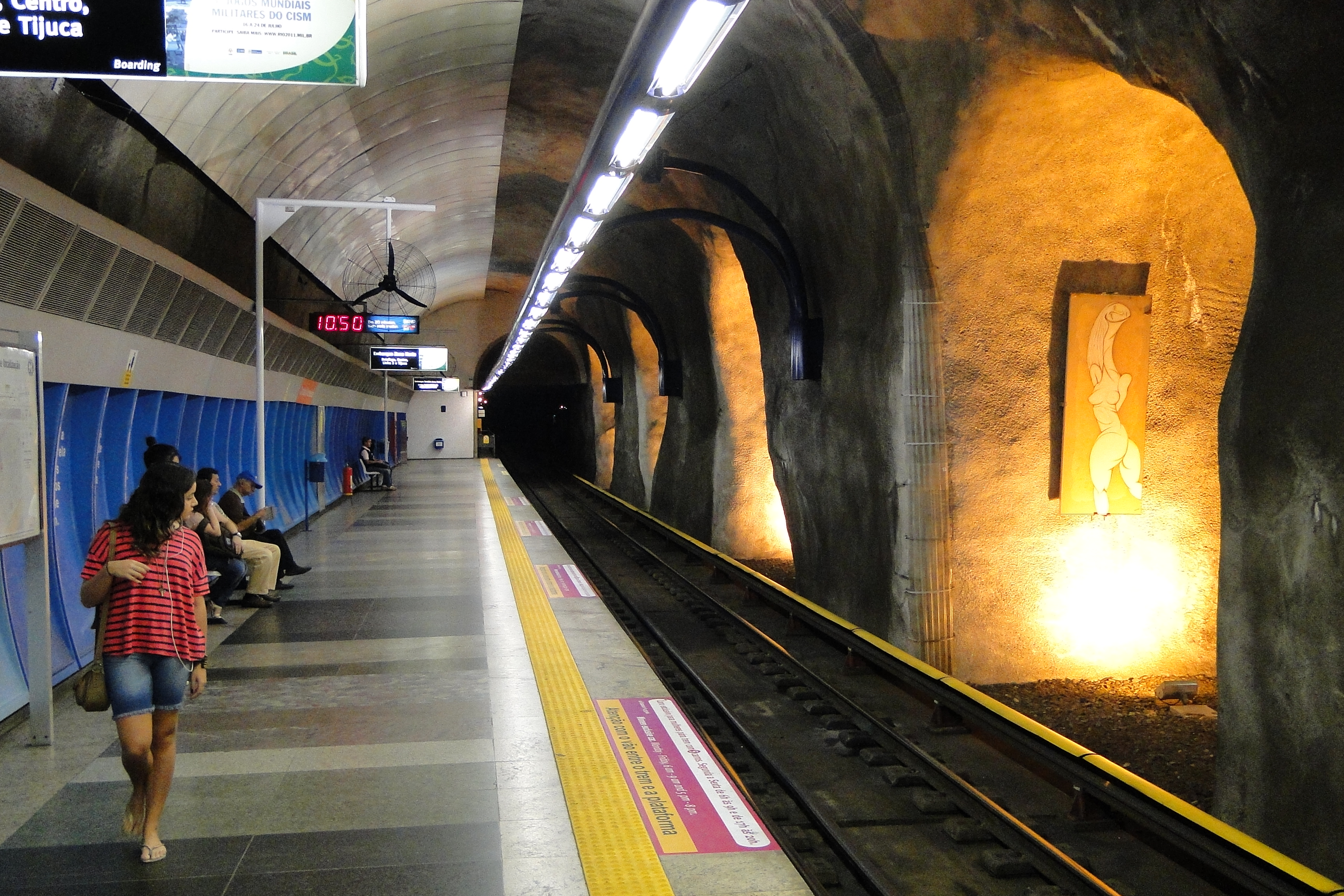
Cardeal Arcoverde Station (nicknamed "Batcave") in Copacabana.

Line 2 opened from Estácio to Maracanã via São Cristóvão in 1981, and initially used the same rolling stock as Line 1, but, due to a shortage of this rolling stock, started instead using modified light rail vehicles that had been ordered for the planned pre-metro system in 1982. Line 2 was extended from Maracanã to Maria da Graça in 1983; at the same time, the at-grade pre-metro was opened from Maria da Graça to Irajá along an abandoned railway alignment via Del Castilho and Inhaúma. By 1984, Line 2 used 5 trains and ran every 5.5 minutes. A burst pipeline in 1985 led to the closure of the pre-metro line; it was partially rebuilt as fully grade-separated metro and re-opened in 1987 as an extension of Line 2, with trains running from Estácio to Inhaúma. In 1988, Triagem Station opened. Engenho da Rainha Station opened in 1991 and was followed by Thomaz Coelho Station and Vicente de Carvalho Station, both of which opened in 1996. By this point, Line 2 used 9 trains and ran every 6 minutes.

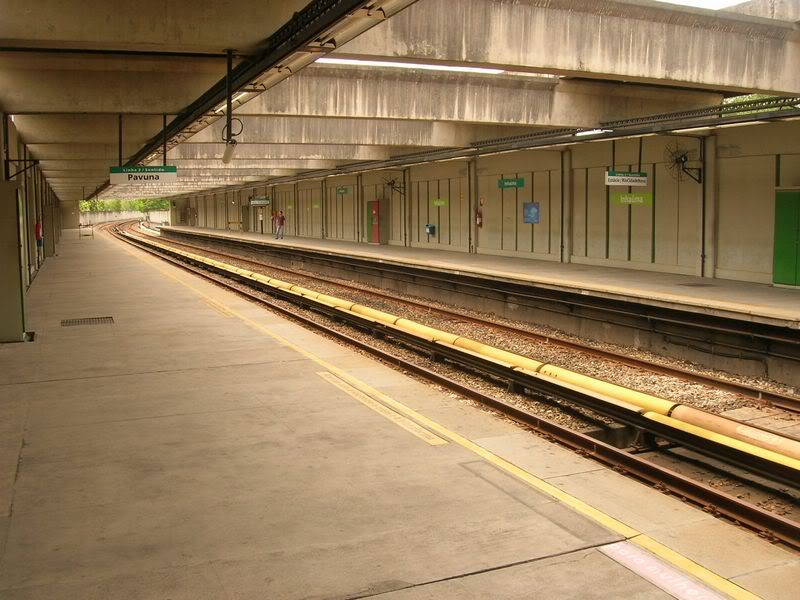
Inhaúma Station

Since 1997, the metro has operated 24/7 during Carnaval. In December of that year, the management and operation of the system was privatized, with the Opportrans Consortium presenting the winning bid for a 20 year lease under the Metrô Rio brand; expansion of the network and purchase of new rolling stock is still the responsibility of the state government through Rio Trilhos. In 1998, Line 1 was extended from Botafogo to Copacabana with the opening of Cardeal Arcoverde Station. The same year, Line 2 was extended from Vicente de Carvalho to Pavuna via Irajá, Colégio, Coelho Neto, Acari/Fazenda Botafogo and Engenheiro Rubens Paiva. Since 1999, the metro has sold tickets in advance for the Rio Réveillon, with passengers assigned a specific time window to pass through the ticket barriers.

In 2002, Siqueira Campos Station in Copacabana was inaugurated. In 2004, the metro started operating on Sundays. Cantagalo Station beyond Siqueira Campos was due to be completed in March 2006, but owing to financial problems, the opening date was postponed to 15 December. This was again postponed and the final opening took place in February 2007. Estácio Station was briefly renamed Estácio/RioCidadeNova in 2007 as part of a partnership with a nearby convention centre.

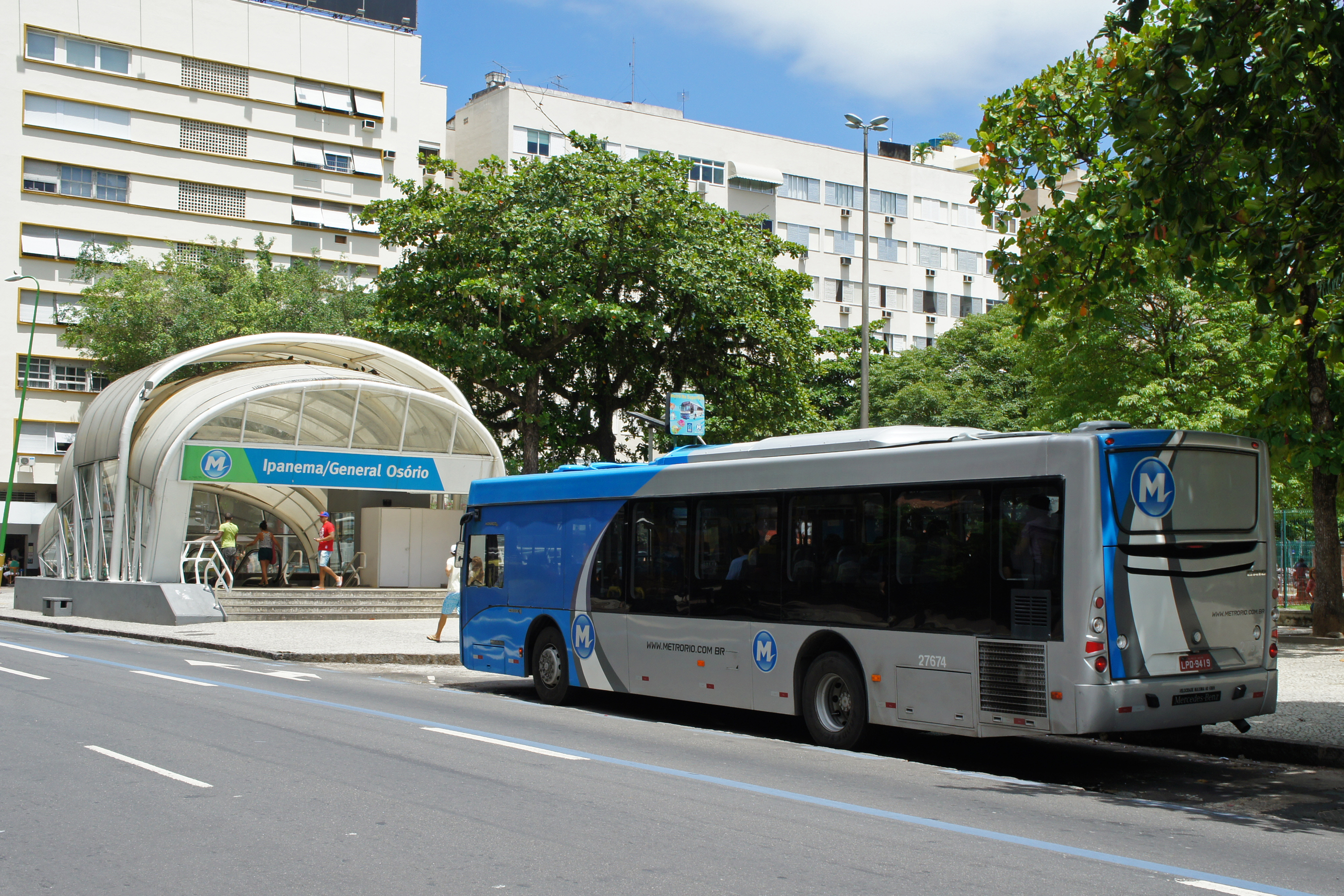
General Osório Station. The bus was part of the Metrô na Superfície (Metro on the Surface), which was a bus service operated by Metrô Rio between some South Zone stations and Gávea from 2002 to 2024.

In late December 2007, Metro Rio renewed the concession, then defined as for another 20 years, to 2038. In exchange for this early renewal, Metro Rio would buy 19 new trains; Metro Rio would also build a new stretch of track between São Cristóvão and Central, which would be used to interline Line 2 and Line 1, as well as a new station on that section of track. In March 2008, Del Castilho Station was renamed Nova América/Del Castilho as part of a partnership between Metrô Rio and the adjacent Nova América Shopping Mall. It had been renamed back to Del Castilho by 2021. Ipanema/General Osório Station in Ipanema opened in December 2009, and was renamed General Osório in 2013. The connection between São Cristóvão and Central also opened in December 2009. The same month, Invepar bought control of Metro Rio from the Opportrans Consortium. Cidade Nova Station, located between São Cristóvão and Central, opened in November 2010. From 2009 to 2023, Line 2 ran from Pavuna to Botafogo on weekdays and from Pavuna to Estácio on weekends and public holidays, which meant that Cidade Nova station was only open on weekdays. Since 2023, Line 2 has run from Pavuna to Botafogo every day, with trains continuing on to General Osório during special events.

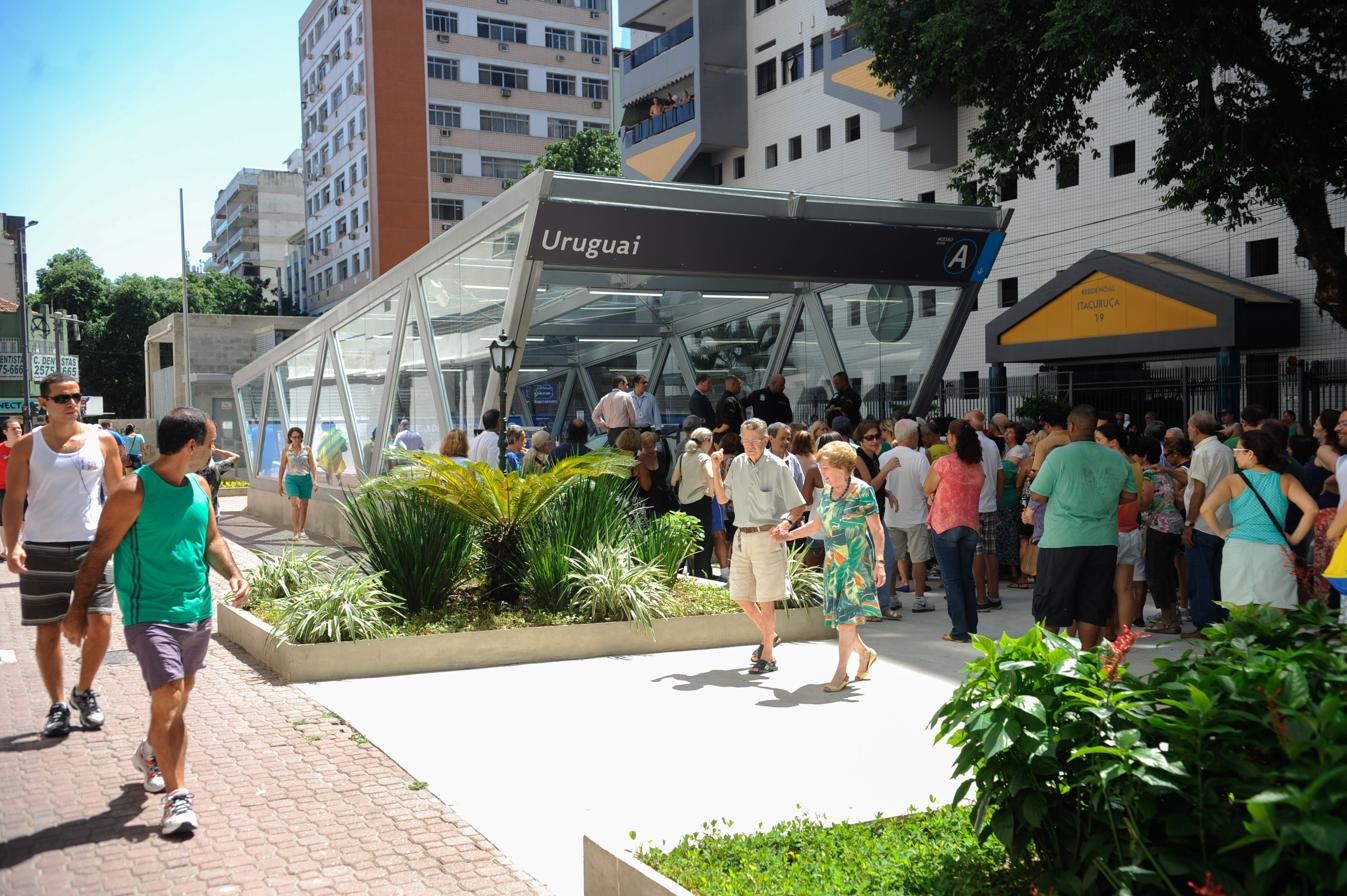
Uruguai Station entrance

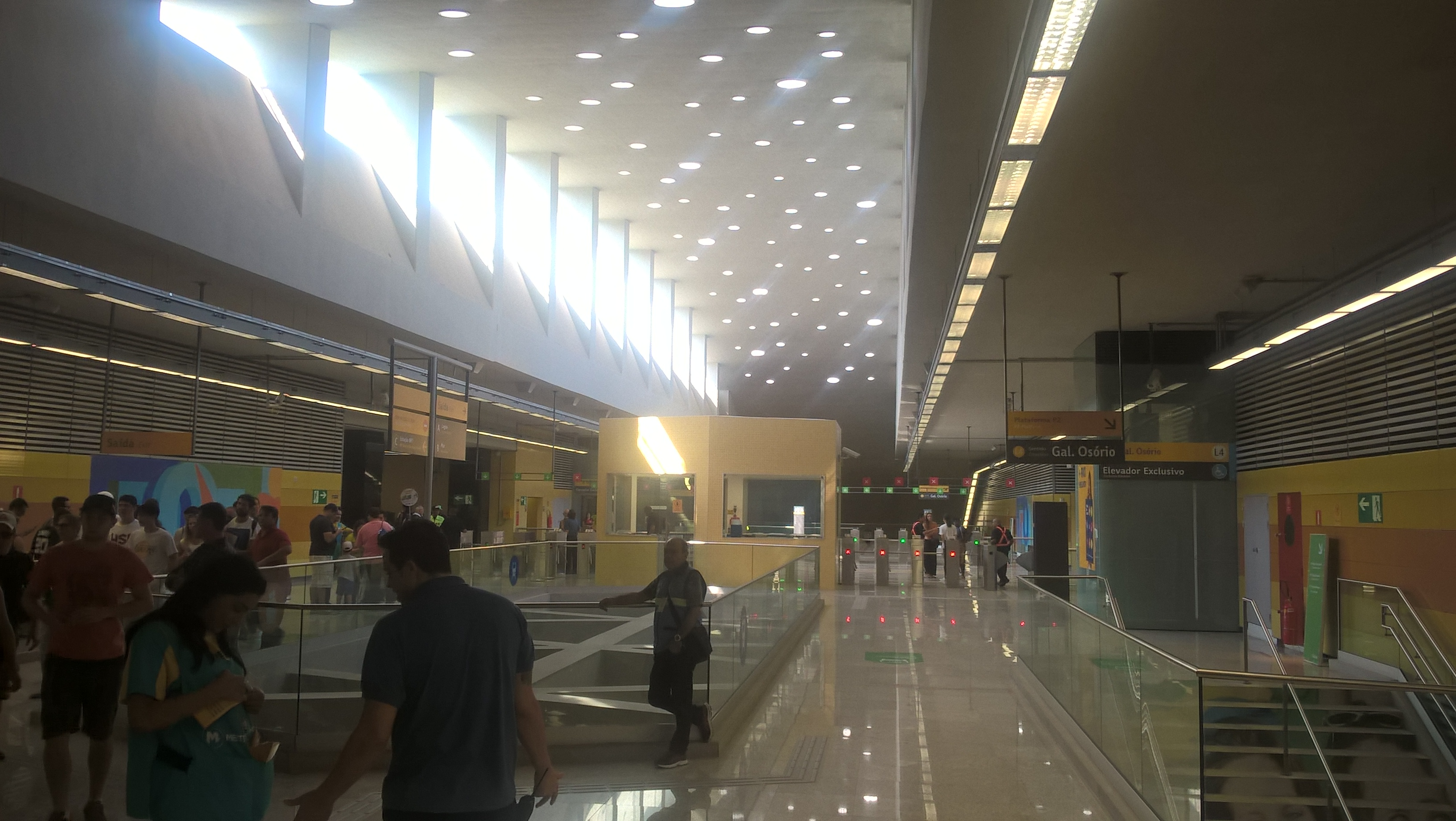
Jardim Oceânico Station

19 new trains, built by CNR (which merged into CRRC in 2015), arrived between August 2012 and March 2013. These trains are able to carry up to 2240 people and have a top speed of 100 km/h (62 mph); they also have air conditioning units that allow the trains to operate in temperatures of up to 56 °C (133 °F). In March 2014, Line 1 was extended further into Tijuca with the opening of Uruguai Station. In 2016, Line 4 was completed between General Osório Station and Jardim Oceânico Station. This line had been legally conceded to the Rio Barra consortium, which was owned by Queiroz Galvão, Odebrecht and Carioca Engenharia, and had its rolling stock acquired by MetroBarra, which was owned by Invepar; Metrô Rio was responsible for operation and maintenance of the new line. Line 4 originally opened on 1st August, 4 days before the start of the 2016 Olympic Games, but was restricted to Olympic and Paralympic ticket holders, athletes and media members until 19th September, the day after the Paralympic Games ended. 15 more CRRC trains were used for Line 4, with a total of 34 such trains in the system. In March 2017, Lines 1 and 4 were fully interlined, with all trains running from Uruguai to Jardim Oceânico.

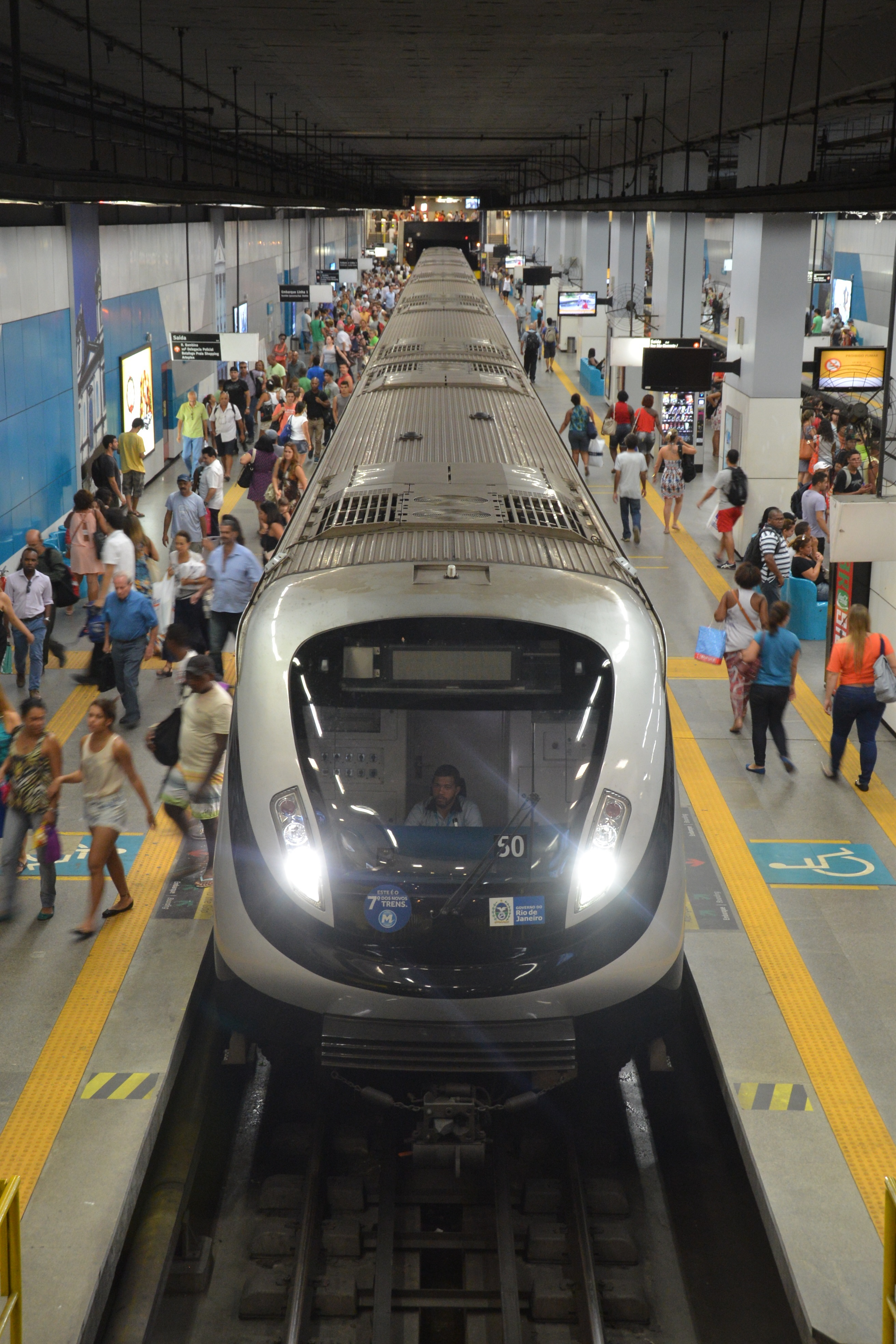
China CNR train at Botafogo Station

Gávea Station, which is located on a Line 4 spur between Antero de Quental and São Conrado, started construction in 2013, but construction was abandoned in 2015 due to an investigation from the Rio de Janeiro State Court of Accounts (TCE-RJ) into overpriced contracts. Nearby tunneling work continued until April 2016. By the time construction work was abandoned, there was a 35 m (115 ft) deep hole at the station site; this was flooded with 36 million litres (9.5 million US gallons; 7.9 million imperial gallons) of water in 2017 so as to minimize structural risk to the surrounding buildings, including PUC-RJ. The function of Gávea Station in the metro system would be as an interchange station between a deinterlined Line 1 and Line 4, with Line 1 running a circular route via Antero de Quental that will go under Tijuca Massif towards Uruguai, and Line 4 running from Barra da Tijuca to the city centre via São Conrado and Jardim Botânico. In August 2025, work resumed on the station, with a shuttle between São Conrado and Gávea expected to open by July 2028.

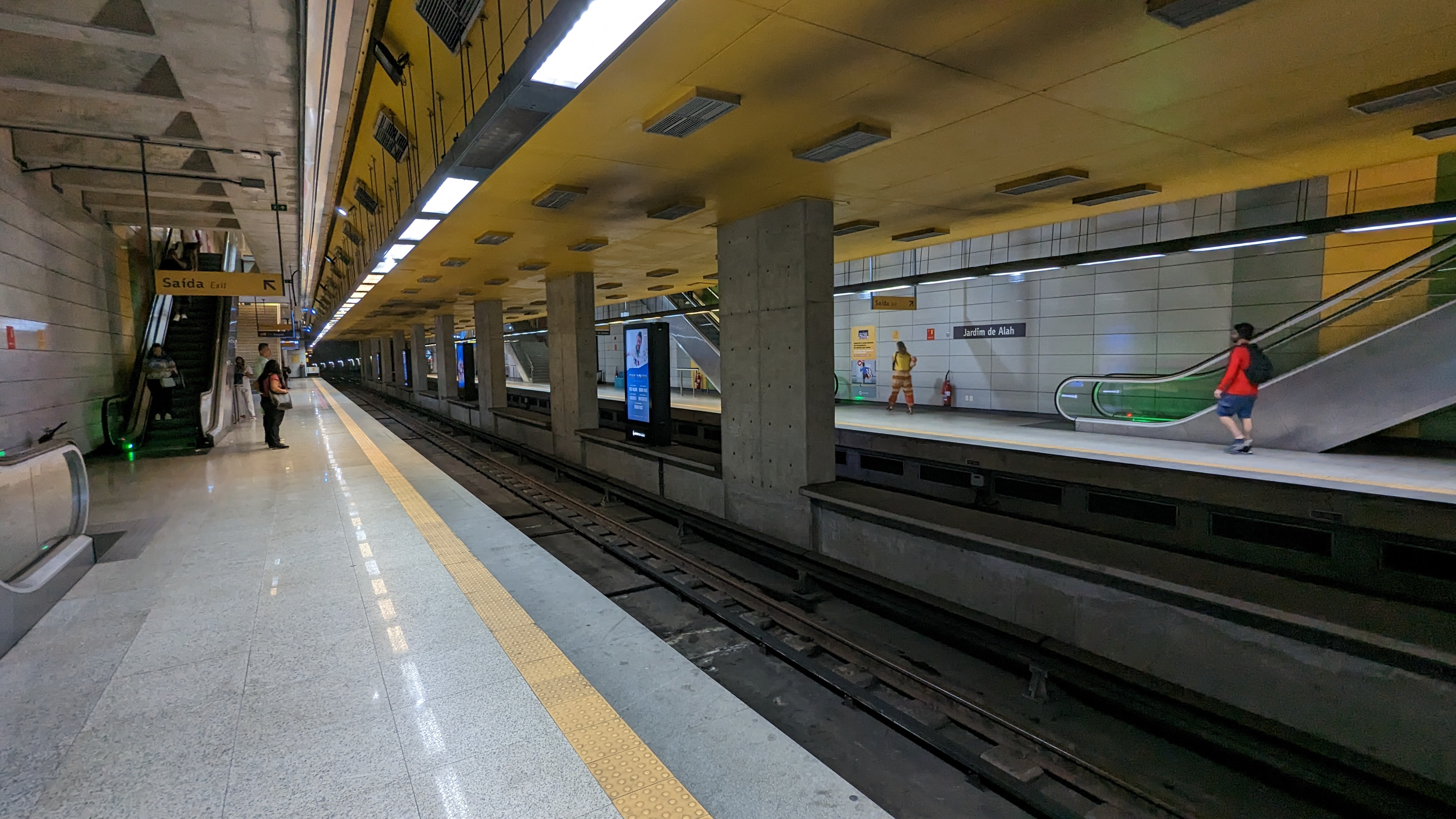
Jardim de Alah Station

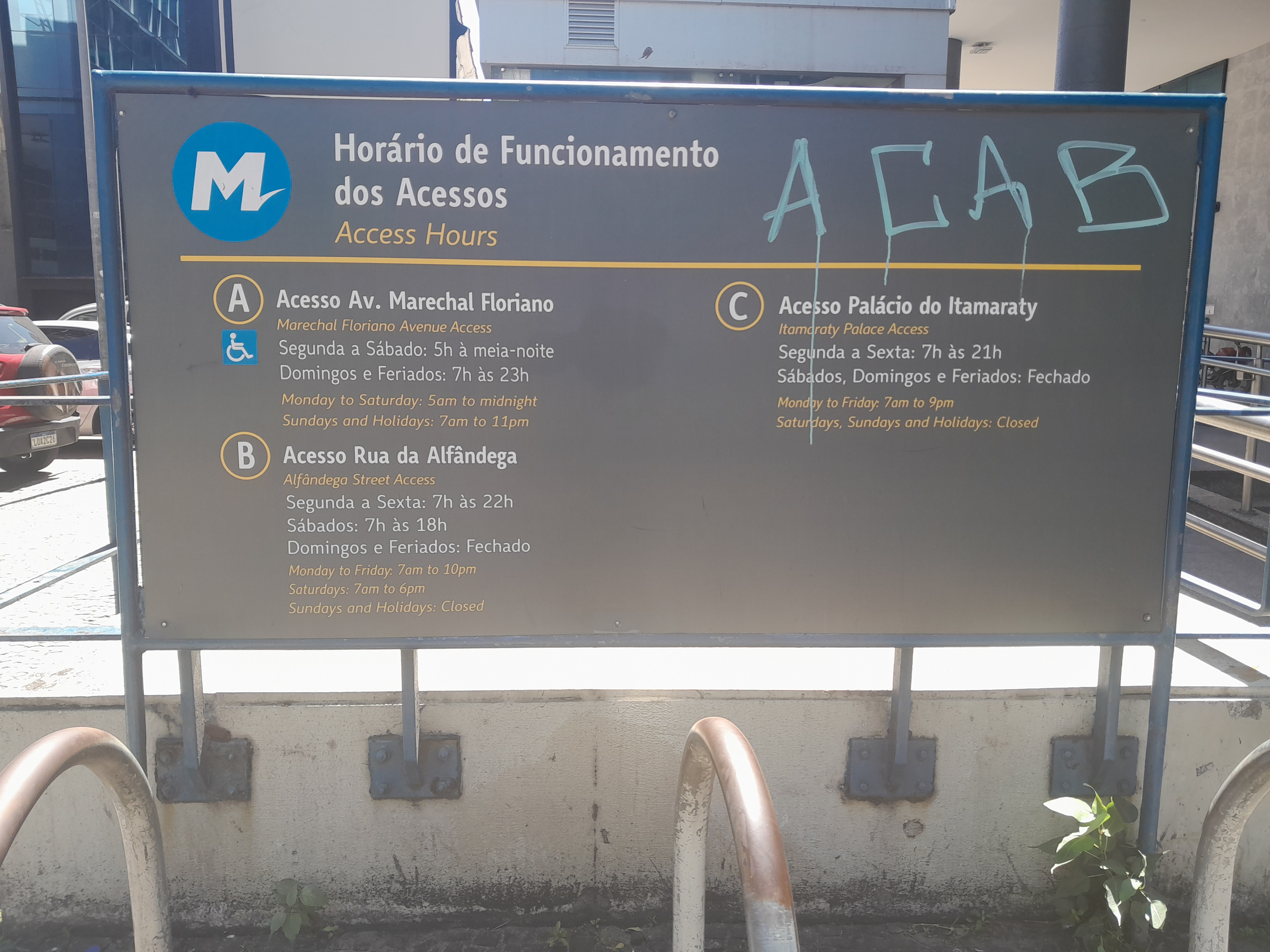
Opening hours for each entrance at Saara / Presidente Vargas Station

In November 2019, a state law officially changed the name of Uruguaiana Station to Uruguaiana-Engenheiro Fernando Mac Dowell after the then-recently deceased vice-mayor. At the time, Metrô Rio ignored this law and would go on to rename the station themselves in 2022. In January 2021, Metrô Rio sold the naming rights to Botafogo Station, which was renamed Botafogo/Coca-Cola; the name was reverted to Botafogo in November 2022. In June 2022, a state law changed the name of Presidente Vargas Station to Saara/Presidente Vargas so as to promote the nearby Saara commercial district. In August 2022, another 16 of the system's 41 stations were renamed after the neighbourhoods where they are located: Uruguai, Saens Peña, São Francisco Xavier, Afonso Pena, Central, Uruguaiana, Carioca, Cinelândia, Cardeal Arcoverde, Siqueira Campos, Cantagalo, General Osório, Nossa Senhora da Paz, Jardim de Alah, Antero de Quental and Jardim Oceânico were respectively renamed to Uruguai / Tijuca, Saens Peña / Tijuca, São Francisco Xavier / Tijuca, Afonso Pena / Tijuca, Central do Brasil / Centro, Uruguaiana / Centro, Carioca / Centro, Cinelândia / Centro, Cardeal Arcoverde / Copacabana, Siqueira Campos / Copacabana, Cantagalo / Copacabana, General Osório / Ipanema, Nossa Senhora da Paz / Ipanema, Jardim de Alah / Leblon, Antero de Quental / Leblon and Jardim Oceânico / Barra da Tijuca. On 20 June 2026, Uruguaiana / Centro was renamed by Metrô Rio to Uruguaiana / Engenheiro Fernando Mac Dowell, in accordance with state law.

In September 2021, Mubadala took over control over Metrô Rio from Invepar in exchange for Mubadala forgiving R$1.8 billion worth of debt owed by Invepar. In April 2025, the State Government signed a deal that extended Metrô Rio's concession until 2048 in exchange for Metrô Rio investing R$600 million into the construction of Gávea Station, with the State Government adding in another R$97 million. The agreement also provided for Metrô Rio to take over the Line 4 concession from the Rio Barra Consortium, which up until that point had been administratively separate despite being operated as an extension of Line 1.

Since tracking began in 1998, there has been a steady increase in passenger traffic in the metro. There is a drastic dip in early 2020 due to the COVID-19 pandemic.

== Network ==
=== Summary ===
- Line 1 (Orange)/Line 4 (Yellow): Uruguai / Tijuca, Saens Peña / Tijuca, São Francisco Xavier / Tijuca, Afonso Pena / Tijuca, Estácio, Praça Onze, Central do Brasil / Centro, Saara / Presidente Vargas, Uruguaiana / Engenheiro Fernando Mac Dowell, Carioca / Centro, Cinelândia / Centro, Glória, Catete, Largo do Machado, Flamengo, Botafogo, Cardeal Arcoverde / Copacabana, Siqueira Campos / Copacabana, Cantagalo / Copacabana, General Osório / Ipanema, Nossa Senhora da Paz / Ipanema, Jardim de Alah / Leblon, Antero de Quental / Leblon, São Conrado, Jardim Oceânico / Barra da Tijuca.

Though nominally separate lines, Line 1 and Line 4 are operated as a single line, with all trains running between Uruguai / Tijuca Station and Jardim Oceânico / Barra da Tijuca Station. There is a short section of elevated track over the Joatinga Channel, close to Jardim Oceânico / Barra da Tijuca; the rest of the line, including all stations, are underground. Saens Peña / Tijuca has three tracks and two island platforms; two tracks are used for trains towards Uruguai / Tijuca and one track is used for trains towards Jardim Oceânico / Barra da Tijuca. Estácio, Carioca / Centro, Botafogo and General Osório / Ipanema use the Spanish solution, including at the seldom-used terminating platforms at Estácio and General Osório. Uruguai / Tijuca, Central do Brasil / Centro, Cinelândia / Centro and São Conrado have island platforms. All other stations have side platforms, with up and down tracks divided by a low wall interspersed with thin pillars at stations. Every station has a mezzanine.

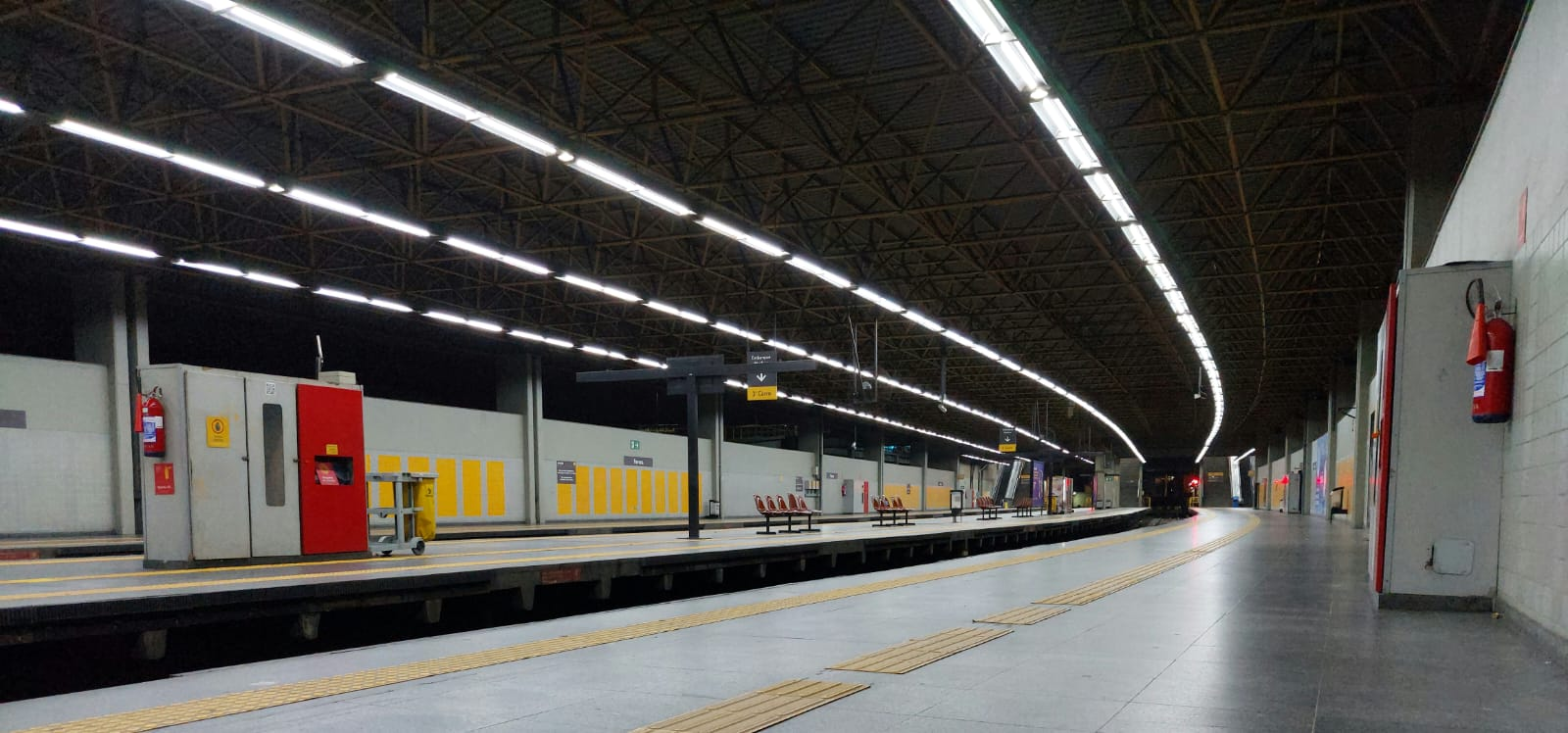
Pavuna Station

- Line 2 (Green): Pavuna, Engenheiro Rubens Paiva, Acari/Fazenda Botafogo, Coelho Neto, Colégio, Irajá, Vicente de Carvalho, Thomaz Coelho, Engenho da Rainha, Inhaúma, Del Castilho, Maria da Graça, Triagem, Maracanã, São Cristóvão, Cidade Nova, Central do Brasil / Centro, Saara / Presidente Vargas, Uruguaiana / Engenheiro Fernando Mac Dowell, Carioca / Centro, Cinelândia / Centro, Glória, Catete, Largo do Machado, Flamengo, Botafogo.

During special events, some Line 2 trains continue from Botafogo to General Osório / Ipanema via Cardeal Arcoverde / Copacabana, Siqueira Campos / Copacabana and Cantagalo / Copacabana.

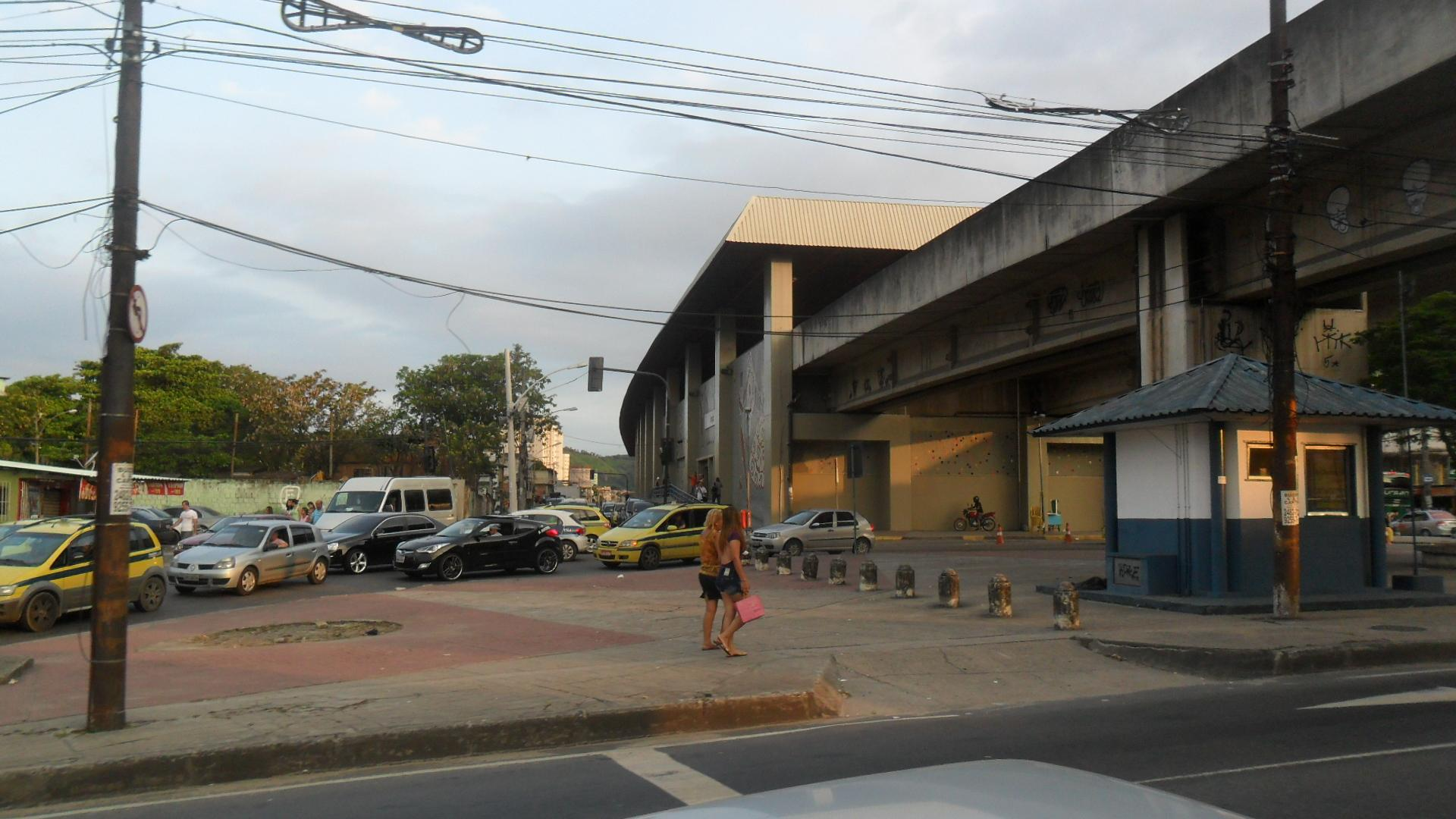
Irajá Station

The line is above-ground from Pavuna to Cidade Nova and underground from Central do Brasil / Centro to Botafogo. The section between Pavuna and Cidade Nova is mostly at-grade, with elevated sections through Colégio, Irajá and Triagem, and also between São Cristóvão and Cidade Nova. There is also a short section in a cutting and a bridge over the Acari River between Engenheiro Rubens Paiva and Acari/Fazenda Botafogo, as well as short tunnels between Del Castilho and Maria da Graça and between Triagem and Maracanã.

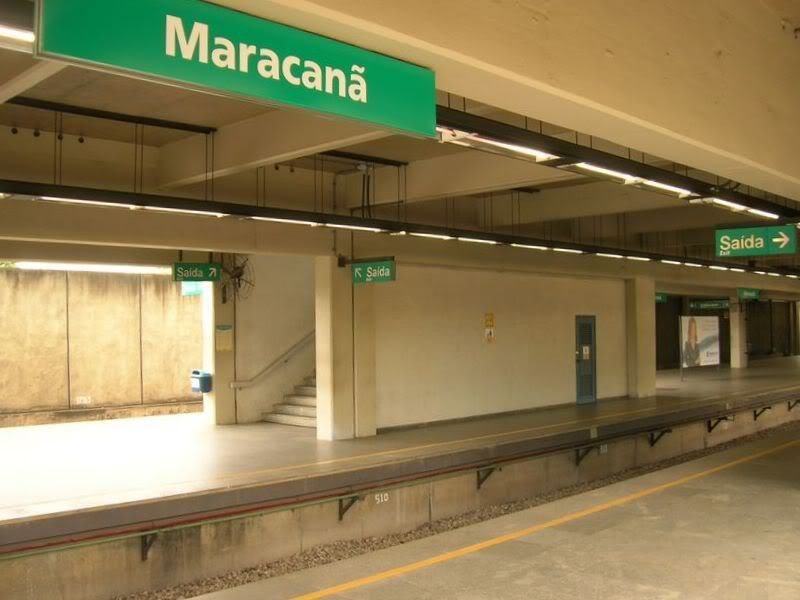
Maracanã Station

Maracanã has three tracks and two island platforms. Pavuna, Carioca / Centro and Botafogo use the Spanish solution, as do the seldom-used platforms at Estácio and General Osório / Ipanema. Engenheiro Rubens Paiva, Acari/Fazenda Botafogo, Colégio, Irajá, Engenho da Rainha, Cidade Nova, Central do Brasil / Centro and Cinelândia / Centro have island platforms. All other stations have side platforms.

Central, which is a major interchange point between both lines of the Metro, local bus and van lines, the Providência Cable Car, the Rio de Janeiro Light Rail and the suburban rail network, is the busiest station on the network.

=== Connections ===
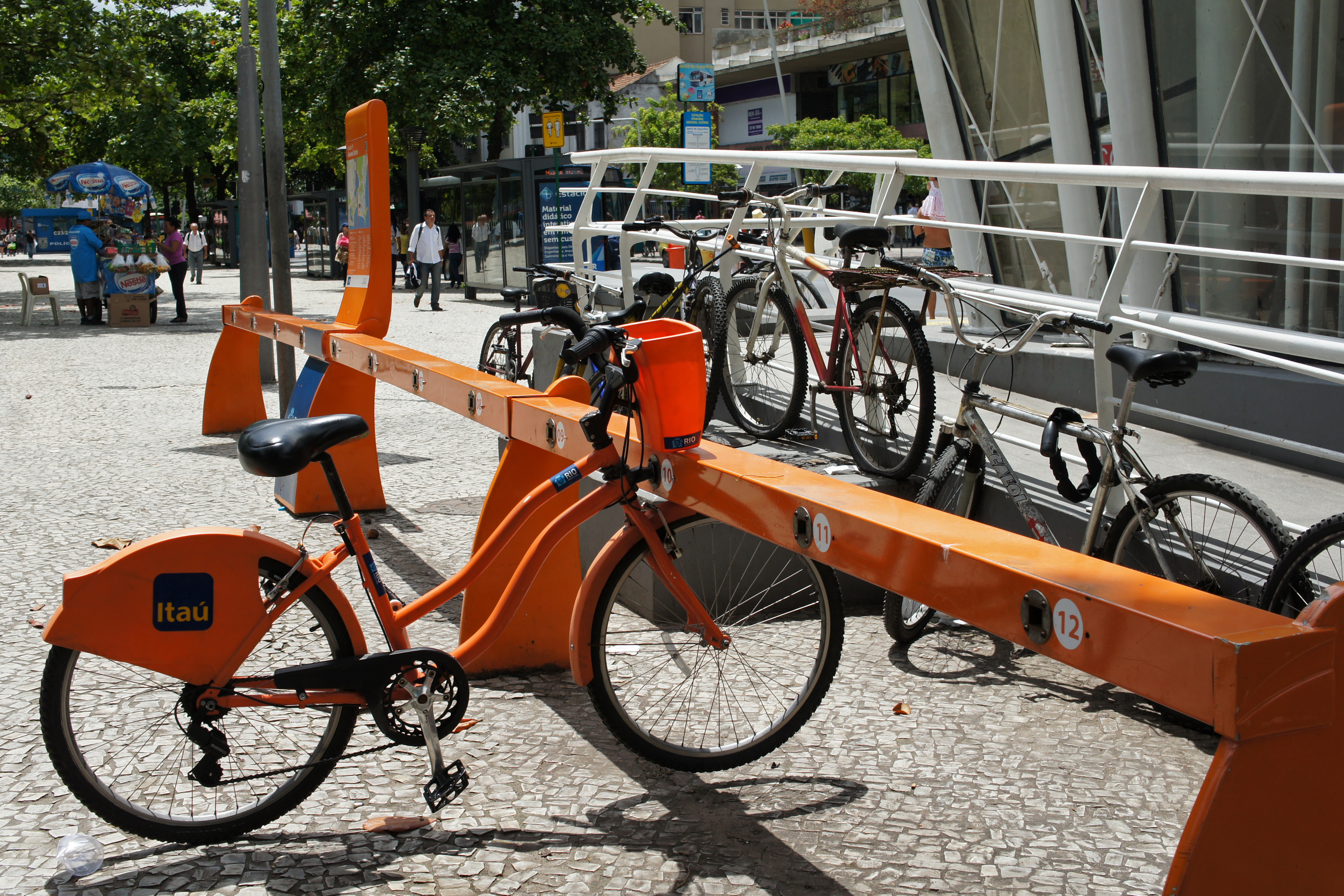
Bicycles at a metro station in Rio.

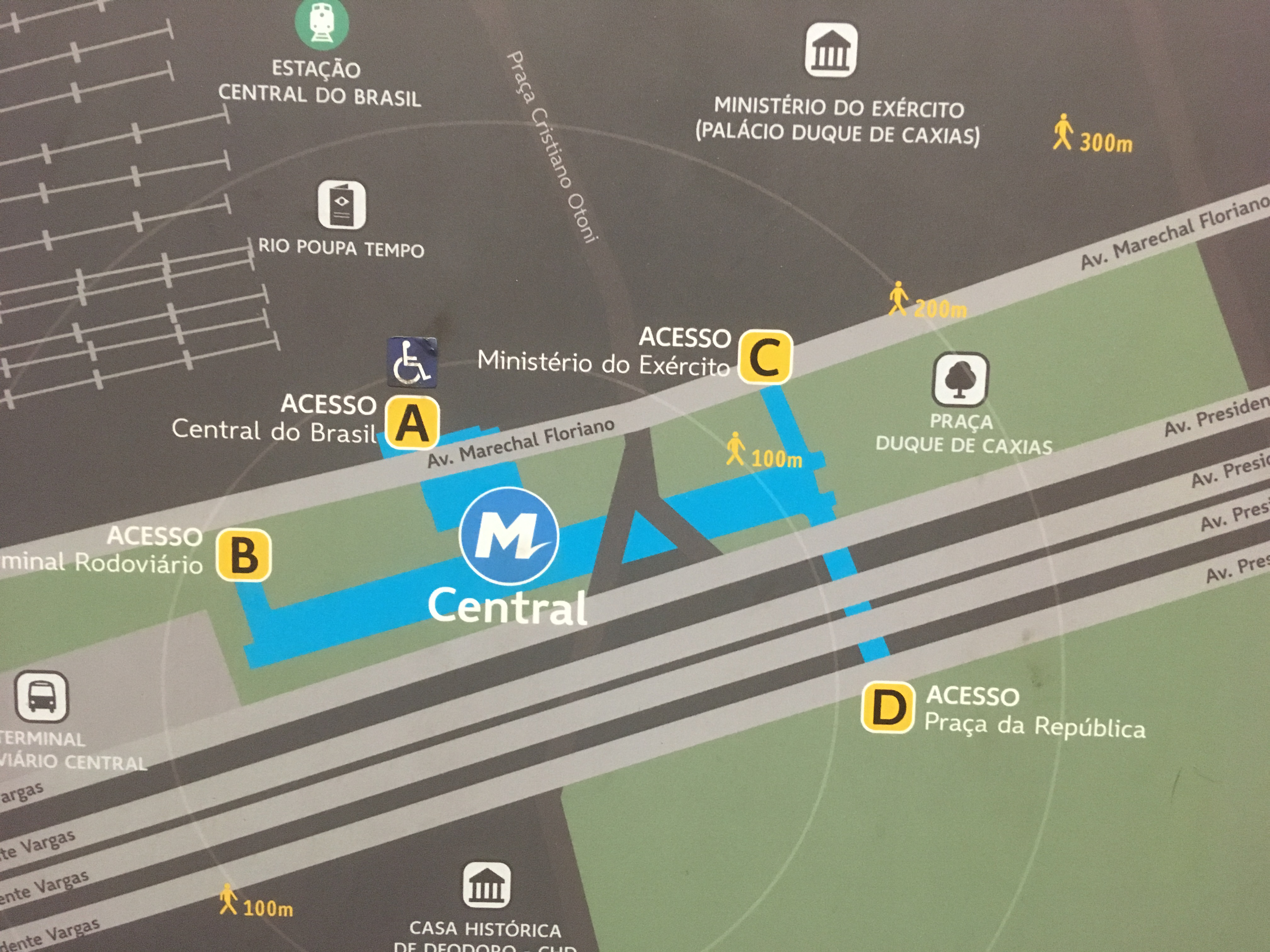
Map of surrounding area at Central do Brasil / Centro

- Line 1/4 and Line 2 through-run between Central do Brasil / Centro and Botafogo.
- Buses run to every station on the Metro system.
- There are major local bus stations at Central do Brasil / Centro and Carioca / Centro.
- Central do Brasil / Centro, São Cristóvão and Maracanã are transfer stations with the Deodoro, Santa Cruz, Japeri, Belford Roxo and Saracuruna Lines of the Suburban Rail system; Triagem has transfers to the Belford Roxo and Saracuruna Lines; Pavuna has a transfer to the Belford Roxo Line.
- Thomaz Coelho is 850 metres (0.53 mi) away from Tomás Coelho Station on the Belford Roxo Line of the Suburban Rail system; Del Castilho Station on the Metro is 350 metres (0.22 mi) away from the identically-named Del Castilho Station on the Belford Roxo Line of the Suburban Rail system.
- Central do Brasil / Centro has transfers to Lines 2, 3 and 4 of the Light Rail system; Carioca / Centro has transfers to Lines 1, 2, 3 and 4; Cinelândia / Centro has transfers to Lines 1 and 3.
- Saara / Presidente Vargas is 260 metres (0.16 mi) away from Camerino/Rosas Negras Station on Line 3 of the Light Rail system; Uruguaiana / Engenheiro Fernando Mac Dowell is 400 metres (0.25 mi) away from Candelária Station on Lines 1 and 3.
- Vicente de Carvalho has a transfer to the TransCarioca BRT; Jardim Oceânico / Barra da Tijuca has a transfer to the TransOeste BRT.
- Acari/Fazenda Botafogo is 1.2 kilometres (0.75 mi) away from Fazenda Botafogo Station on the TransBrasil BRT, but unlike the transfers at Vicente de Carvalho and Jardim Oceânico, there is no possible fare discount for transferring there.
- Central do Brasil / Centro is a station on the Providência Cable Car.
- Carioca / Centro is 700 metres (0.43 mi) away from Praça XV, which has ferries to Niterói, Governador Island and Paquetá Island.
- Carioca / Centro is a stop on the Santa Teresa Tram.
- Glória Station is 450 metres (0.28 mi) away from the Outeiro da Glória inclined elevator; General Osório / Ipanema Station is 900 metres (0.56 mi) away from the Cantagalo-Pavão-Pavãozinho inclined elevator.

== Rolling stock ==
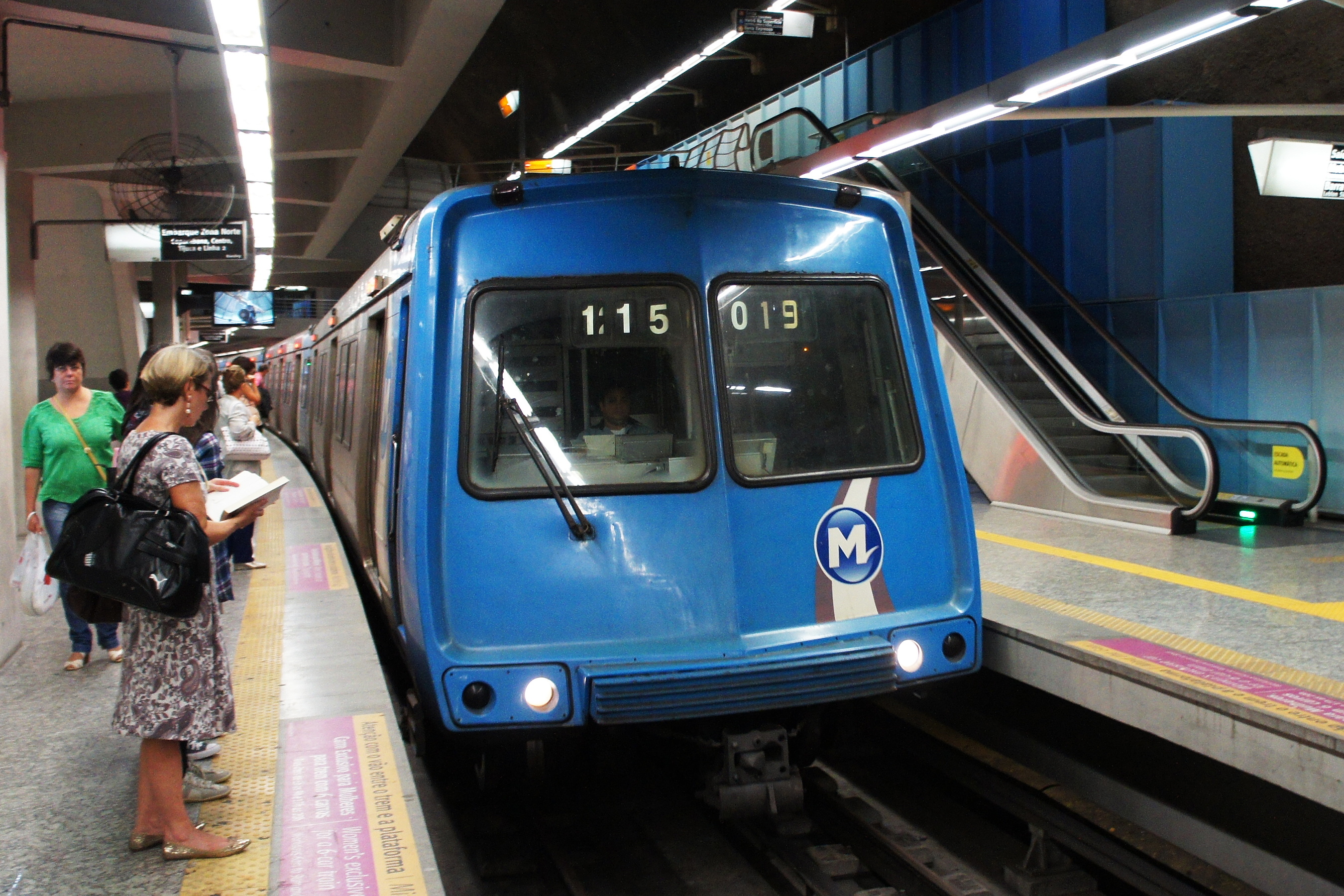
Série 1000 at General Osório / Ipanema

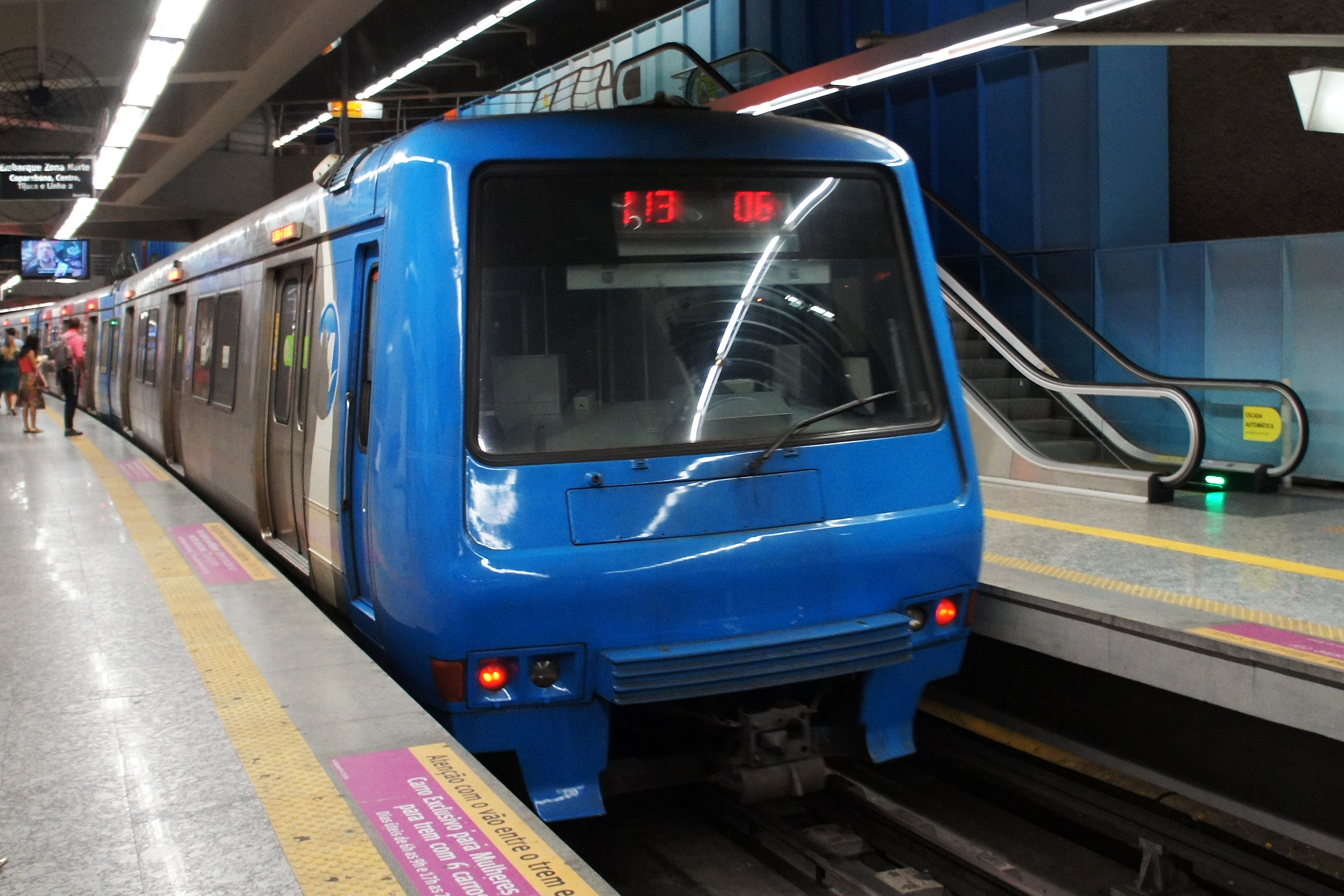
Série 2000 at General Osório / Ipanema

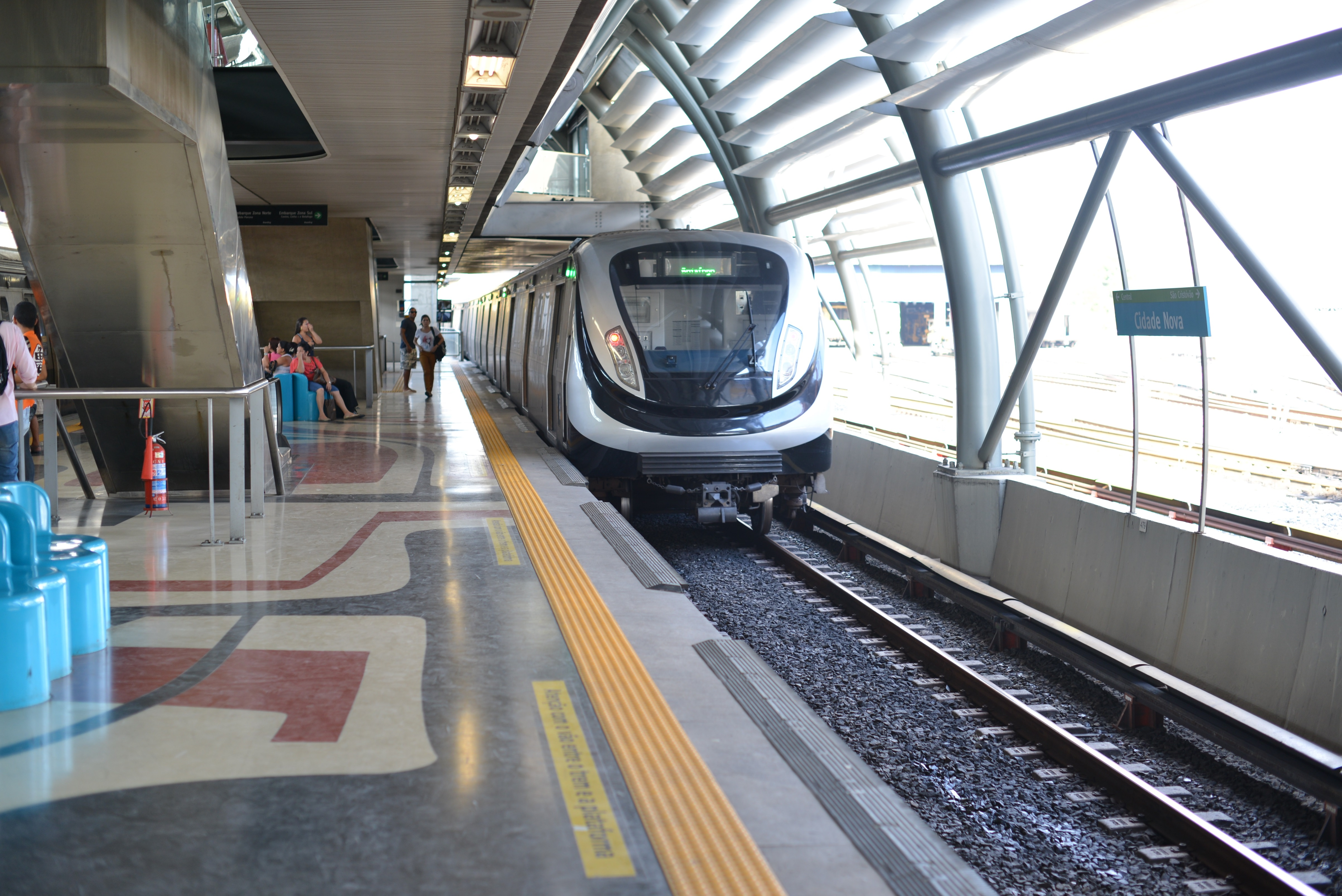
Série 4000 at Cidade Nova

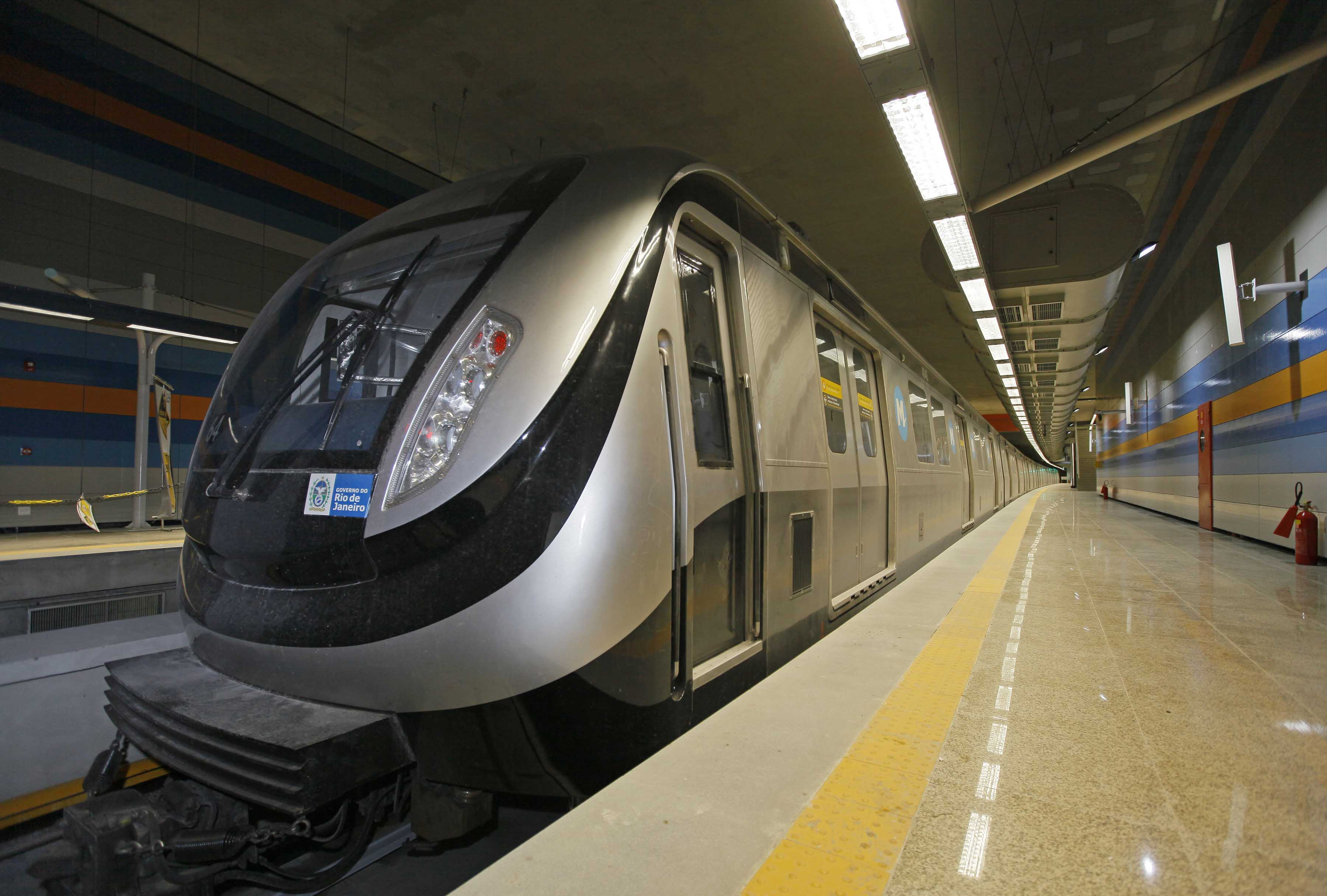
Série 5000 at Antero de Quental / Leblon

The Série 1000 trains were originally built by Mafersa, Budd, Villares and Westinghouse from 1978 to 1984; although 210 cars had originally been ordered, a government budgetary crisis led to only 146 being delivered, enough for 24 6-car EMUs. Each car has three 1,870 mm (74 in) wide doors per side. Because of the Série 1000, the Rio de Janeiro Metro became the second metro system in the world to have only air-conditioned trains when it opened in 1979. A modified version of the Série 1000 known as the Série 2000 was produced by Mafersa and Alstom and handed over in 1998; this included 36 cars, or enough for 6 6-car EMUs. 19 Série 4000 trains were produced by China CNR and handed over from 2012 to 2013, with a further 15 Série 5000 trains handed over by CRRC in 2016; together, these include 204 cars, or enough for 34 6-car EMUs. Therefore, the system has a total of 64 trains.

Every train is built out of stainless steel and has air-conditioning. Passenger trains always use six cars, but Line 2 was originally planned to use eight cars. The Série 1000 can carry 1726 passengers assuming 6 standing passengers per m², or 2210 passengers assuming 8 standing passengers per m²; The Série 2000 can carry 1732 passengers assuming 6 standing passengers per m², or 2226 passengers assuming 8 standing passengers per m²; The Série 4000 and 5000 are type A trains and can carry up to 2240 passengers.

Inside each coach, seat arrangement is both parallel and perpendicular to the windows. When the left side has parallel seats, the right side has perpendicular seats, and vice versa. Each vertical seat has a handle for easier standing. There are vertical stanchions from ceiling to floor for standing passengers, one set in front of the horizontal seats, another set at the middle of the coach.

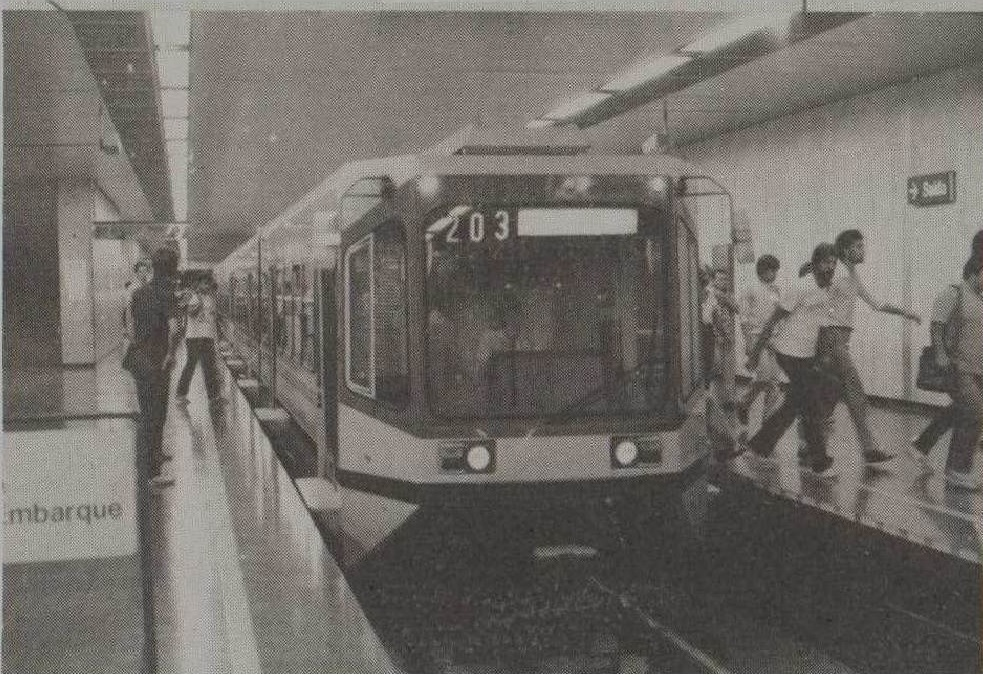
Rio de Janeiro pre-metro at Estácio Station

Since part of Line 2 was formerly a premetro line, it used to use Série 3000 stock, which consisted of modified light rail trains with high doors that had been built by La Brugeoise et Nivelles and Cobrasma. Although these trains were initially built without air-conditioning, they were retrofitted for the re-opening of Line 2 in 1987. By the same year, 31 of these trains were in service. The Série 3000 was also used on the Campinas Light Rail. Each train ran in a two-car configuration with 16 total doors and could carry 436 passengers. This rolling stock was removed from service in 2004 and the trains were left abandoned in Cidade Nova until 2020, when most of them were sold for scrap.

== Fare structure ==
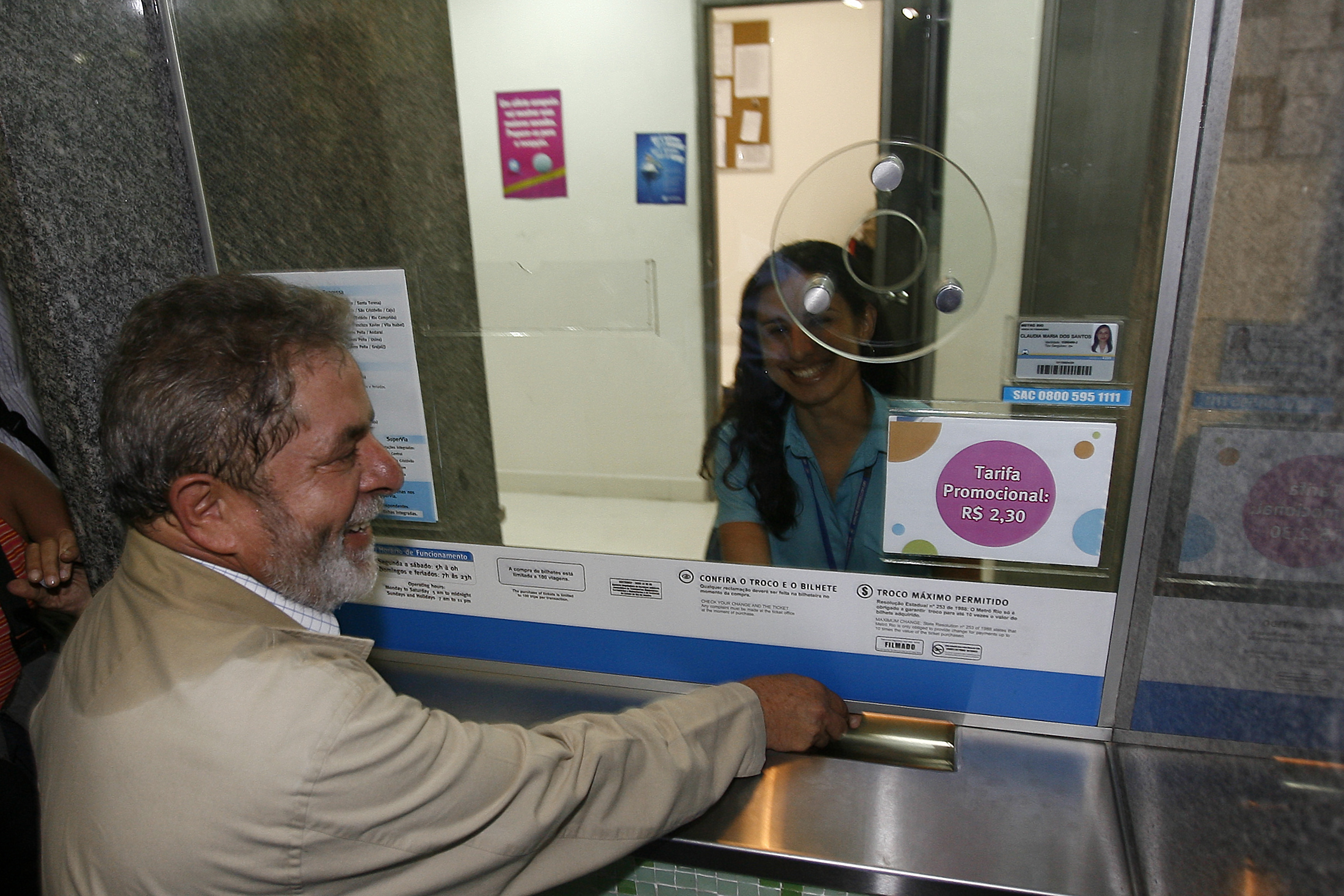
Lula at the Maracanã Station ticket office in 2007

As of January 2026, Rio de Janeiro Metro tickets cost R$7.90, making them the most expensive single-use metro tickets in Brazil. The fare does not change based on distance or time. All stations have ticket barriers, at which at the following are accepted as of January 2026:

- Single (Unitário) tickets can be bought from staffed ticket counters at each station.
- The RioCard is a fare card used throughout the Rio de Janeiro Metropolitan Area. It can be bought and recharged both at staffed ticket counters and at automated ticket machines. It can also be recharged through the RioCard app. People between the ages of 5 and 64 who have a self-declared monthly income lower than R$3205.20 can register for the Bilhete Único Intermunicipal benefit, which lowers some public transport fares and allows for some limited fare integration. This also ties the card to its owner's CPF and biometric identification data. On the Metro, this benefit lowers the fare to R$5 and allows for the following fare integrations: Metro+BRT (at Vicente de Carvalho and Jardim Oceânico / Barra da Tijuca only) for R$9.70; Metro+Intramunicipal bus (309, 538, 539, 548, 583 and 584 at Botafogo and Antero de Quental / Leblon only) for R$7.90; Metro+Intramunicipal bus (133, 209, 513, 603, 608, 611, 614 and 913 only) for R$8.80; Metro+Suburban Rail for R$9.40; Metro+Ferry for R$9.40; Metro+Intermunicipal bus for R$9.40. These fare integrations can't be chained together: For example, a passenger who takes the BRT, the Metro and a ferry in succession will pay the full price for the ferry ticket.
- The Jaé is a fare card used in Rio de Janeiro City. This uses a different fare integration system to the RioCard. Unlike the RioCard, all Jaé cards have fare integration enabled, though Metro trips cost R$7.90. Jaé cards allow for the following fare integrations: Metro+BRT (Vicente de Carvalho and Jardim Oceânico / Barra da Tijuca only) for R$9.70; Metro+Intramunicipal bus (309, 538, 539, 548, 583 and 584 at Botafogo and Antero de Quental / Leblon only) for R$7.90; Metro+Intramunicipal bus (133, 209, 513, 603, 608, 611, 614 and 913 only) for R$8.80; Metro+Van (2101 and 2102 only) for R$8.80. Jaé cards can be recharged at Pavuna, São Francisco Xavier / Tijuca, Central do Brasil / Centro, Siqueira Campos / Copacabana and Antero de Quental / Leblon, as well as other parts of the city. They can also be recharged from the Jaé app.
- Single-use QR Codes can be used via RecargaPay and the Jaé app.
- Credit and debit cards issued by Visa, Mastercard and Elo can be used to pass through the ticket barriers, as can Google Pay and Apple Pay.
- Giro is a fare card issued by Metrô Rio. It can be purchased for R$4 plus a R$7.90 minimum charge and recharged both at stations and through an app.
- Public school students and people older than 65 years of age can apply for a free travel pass. In addition, disabled people have the right to a free travel pass that includes the Metro, suburban rail, ferries and intermunicipal buses, as do people with chronic illnesses who are receiving treatment through the Sistema Único de Saúde.

== Expansion ==
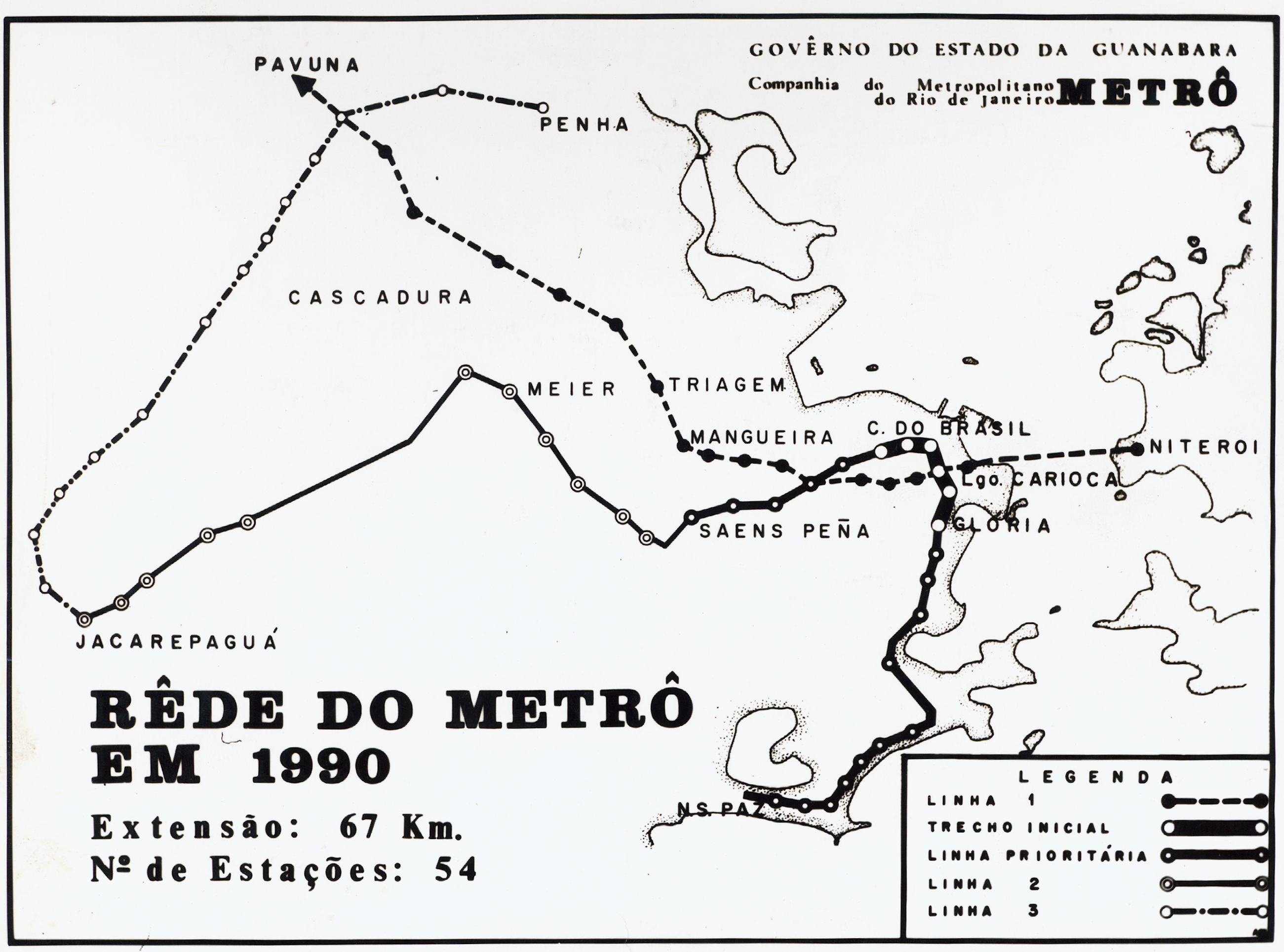
1970 map showing what the network was expected to look like in 1990; as of 2026, the expansions to Niterói, Méier and Jacarepaguá haven't been built.

Gávea Station is under construction. It will initially have a shuttle service to São Conrado, but is planned to be an interchange station between a deinterlined Line 1 and Line 4.

The Rio de Janeiro State government has plans for further expansion of the metro system. As of 2017, the following lines are intended to be built or extended:

- Line 1 would run a circular route via Uruguai / Tijuca, Carioca / Centro, Siqueira Campos / Copacabana, Antero de Quental / Leblon and Gávea. Between Gávea and Uruguai, this line would run under Tijuca National Park. This line would be fully underground.
- Line 2 would be extended from its former terminus at Estácio through Catumbi, Praça da Cruz Vermelha, Carioca / Centro and Praça XV before going under Guanabara Bay to Praça Araribóia in Niterói. This extension would be fully below the surface. A second set of tracks and platforms was partially built under Carioca to facilitate this extension.
- Line 3 would continue North from Araribóia through to Alcântara in São Gonçalo following an abandoned rail alignment. This line would be mostly elevated.
- Line 4 would run from Recreio dos Bandeirantes through Alvorada, Jardim Oceânico / Barra da Tijuca, São Conrado, Gávea, Jardim Botânico, Humaitá and Santa Teresa before terminating at Carioca / Centro. This line would follow the TransOeste BRT between Recreio and Jardim Oceânico.
- The Alvorada-Cocotá Line would run from Barra da Tijuca to Governador Island, following the Linha Amarela highway via Engenho de Dentro, Del Castilho and Fiocruz. It would also run to the main campus of the UFRJ at Cidade Universitária and have a branch to Galeão International Airport.
- The Presidente Vargas-Deodoro Line would run from the city centre to a major Suburban Rail station, following Avenida Brasil. This line has since been effectively supplanted by the TransBrasil BRT.
- The Uruguai-Del Castilho Line would run via Grajaú and Méier.
- The Araribóia-Maravista Line would run via Icaraí, São Francisco and Itaipu. This line would be fully inside Niterói.
- The Fiocruz-Gávea Line would run via Triagem and Uruguai.

In addition to these lines, the following lines and extensions were also considered by the state government: An extension of Line 3 from Alcântara to Itaboraí, an extension of the Araribóia-Maravista Line to Itaipuaçu, a new line from São Francisco to Alcântara parallel to the RJ-104 highway and a new line from Campo Grande to Duque de Caxias via Nova Iguaçu and Pavuna.

In addition to these expansions, an infill station called Morro de São João has been partially constructed. It is located on Line 1 between Botafogo and Cardeal Arcoverde / Copacabana.

== In popular culture ==
- The collection of narratives Entre Linhas: Histórias do Metrô e Trem do Rio de Janeiro (2023), by Sofia Neves, delves into the stories of anonymous passengers on the Rio de Janeiro subway.
- The Metro plays ambient music in stations. The composer of the music used by the metro is Zanna, who has three Latin Grammy nominations. Her voice is also used for in-train announcements.
- In 2025, fourteen years after composing the original Rio Metro theme, Zanna released a new recording of the piece, now featuring its first official lyrics. The updated version pays tribute to the atmosphere of the metro system, its passengers, and even references specific stations, adding a new narrative dimension to the composition.
- During the period of the 2016 Summer Olympics, the in-train announcements of the Metro were modified to feature recordings by three former Brazilian Olympic athletes: Ricardo Prado, a silver medalist at Los Angeles (1984), rower Sebastián Cuattrin, and volleyball player Dora Castanheira. The announcements would provide station names and where the passengers could exit to get to certain competition venues.

One of the announcements was the following:

"Eu sou a Dora castanheira, atleta Olímpica do vôlei. Bem-vindos ao palco dos Jogos Olímpicos Rio 2016. Próxima estação: Maracanã"

(" I am Dora Castanheira, Olympic volleyball athlete. Welcome to the stage of the Rio 2016 Olympic Games. Next stop: Maracanã.")

- The final scene of the Brazilian soap opera Pecado Capital was filmed at the construction site of Carioca Station.
- In the remake of the Brazilian soap opera Pecado Capital, the final scene was filmed at Cardeal Arcoverde Station.
- Central Station (originally called Central do Brasil), a 1998 Oscar nominated Brazilian film directed by Walter Salles, produced by VideoFilmes, written by João Emanuel Carneiro and Marcos Bernstein and starring Fernanda Montenegro and Vinícius de Oliveira, had many scenes filmed at the Central do Brasil Station.

== See also ==
- List of Rio de Janeiro metro stations
- SuperVia
- Rio de Janeiro Light Rail
- Santa Teresa Tram
- List of Latin American rail transit systems by ridership
- List of metro systems
- Rapid transit in Brazil
