= Irajá Station =

Metro station in Rio de Janeiro, Brazil

Irajá
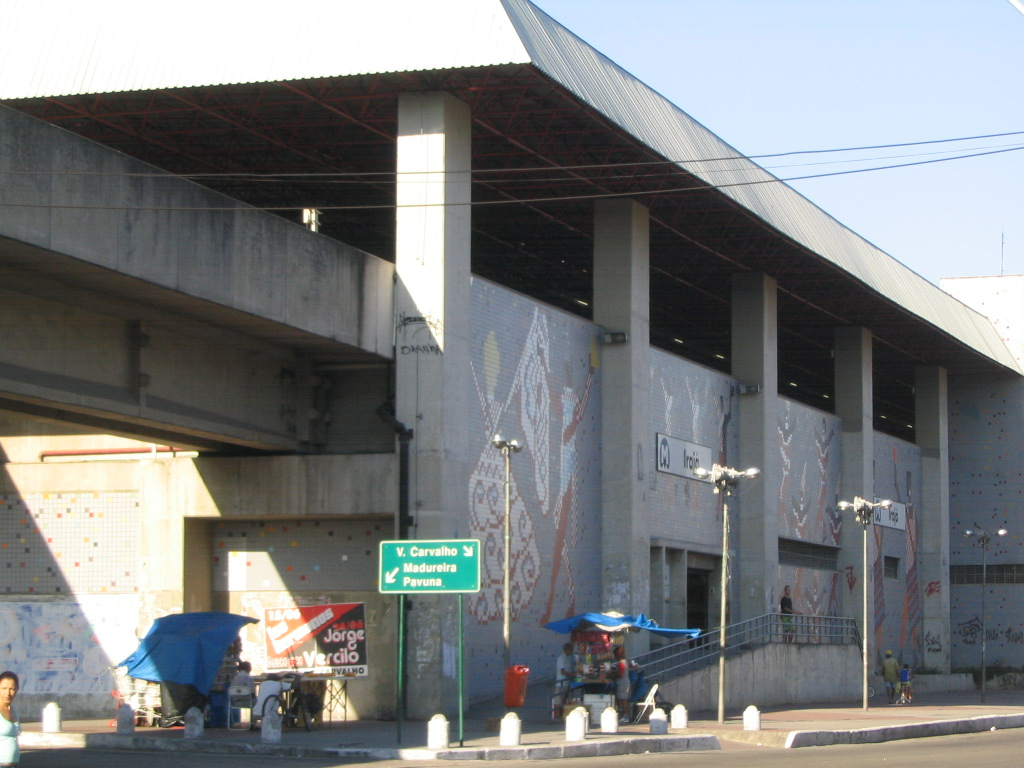
- Metro iraja

General information
- Location: Irajá, Rio de Janeiro; Brazil
- Coordinates: 22.8485801°S 43.3246361°W
- Operator: Metrô Rio
- Line: Line 2

Other information
- Station code: SFX

Services
Preceding station	Rio de Janeiro Metro	Following station
Colégio towards Pavuna	Line 2	Vicente de Carvalho towards Botafogo
Location
- Location within Rio de Janeiro

Irajá Station (Portuguese: Estação Irajá) is a subway station on the Rio de Janeiro Metro that services the neighbourhood of Irajá in the North Zone of Rio de Janeiro.
