= São Conrado Station =

Rapid transit station in Rio de Janeiro, Brazil

São Conrado
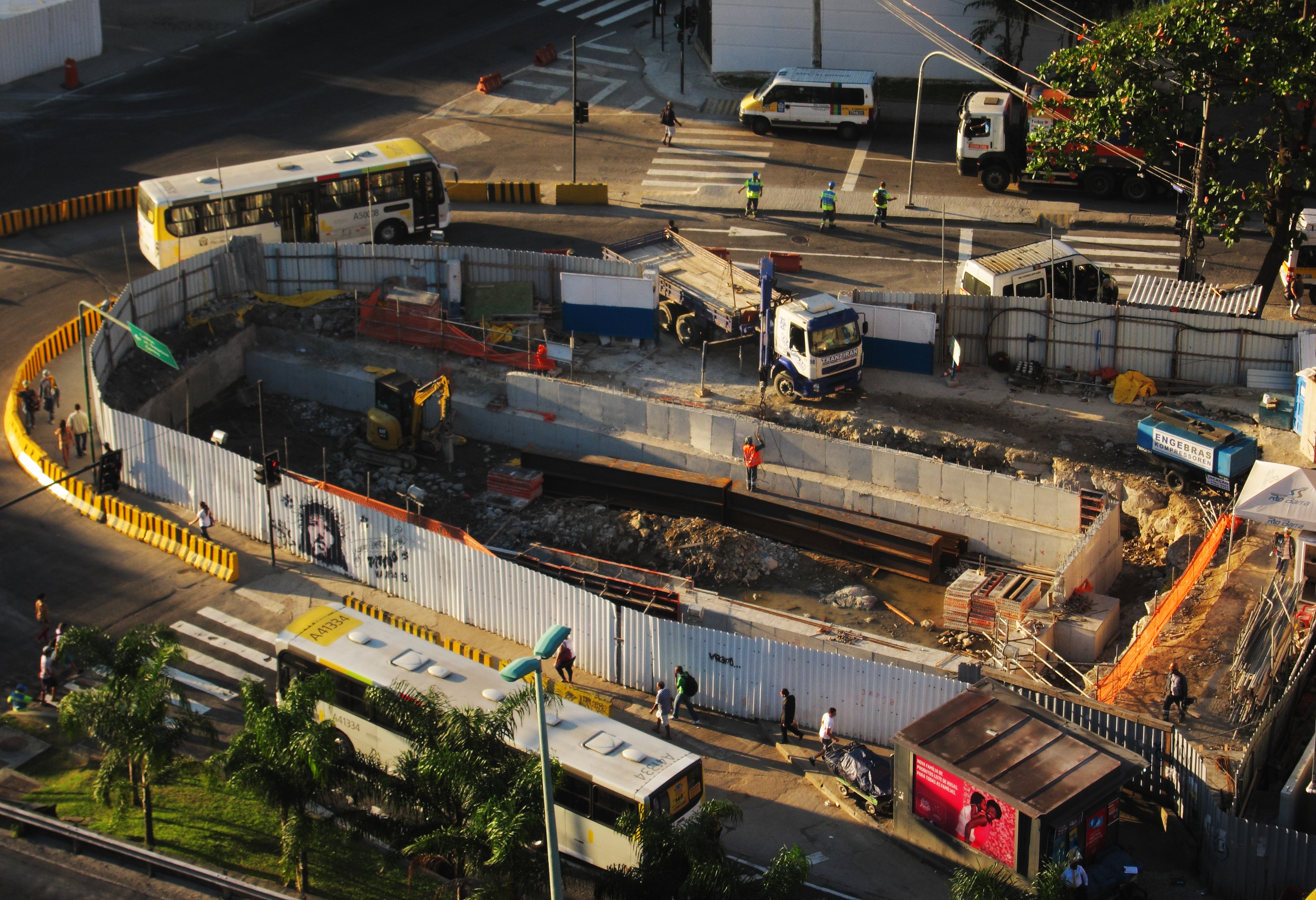
- The staion during construction.

General information
- Location: R. Gen. Olímpio Mourão Filho, 320; Rio de Janeiro; Brazil
- Operated by: Metrô Rio
- Line: Line 4
- Platforms: 2
- Tracks: 2

Construction
- Structure type: Underground

History
- Opened: 30 July 2016; 9 years ago
Location

São Conrado is a station on Line 4 of the Rio de Janeiro Metro, located in the São Conrado neighborhood in Rio de Janeiro, Brazil. It was inaugurated on 30 July 2016. The station is located between the Jardim Oceânico/Barra da Tijuca station and the Antero de Quental Station.
