= Antero de Quental Station =

Metro station in Rio de Janeiro, Brazil

Coordinates: 22°59′8″S 43°13′26″W

Antero de Quental/Leblon Station Estação Antero de Quental/Leblon
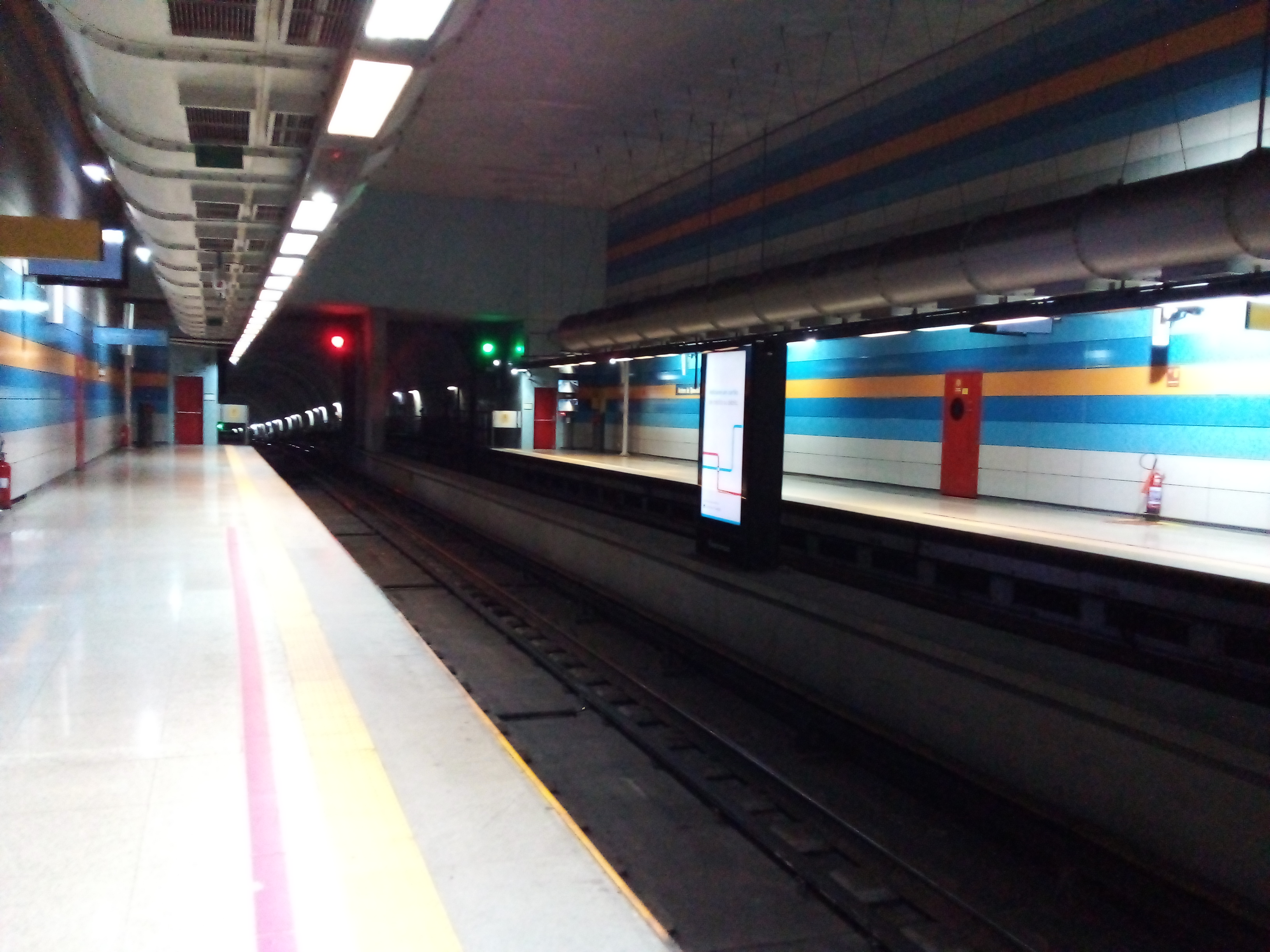

General information
- Location: Rio de Janeiro; Brazil
- System: MetrôRio
- Line: Line 4
- Platforms: 2
- Tracks: 2

Construction
- Structure type: Underground
- Depth: 20 meters

History
- Opened: 2016
Location

Antero de Quental / Leblon is a station on Line 4 of the Rio de Janeiro Metro in Brazil, located in the Leblon Neighborhood of Rio de Janeiro.

The station is located between the Sao Conrado and Jardim de Alah stations of Line 4. It was inaugurated in 2016 together with Line 4, and it has a depth of 20 meters.
