= Coelho Neto, Rio de Janeiro =

Neighborhood in Rio de Janeiro, Brazil

Coelho Neto
- Neighborhood
- Location in Rio de Janeiro Coelho Neto (Brazil)
- Coordinates: 22°49′50″S 43°21′02″W
- Country: Brazil
- State: Rio de Janeiro (RJ)
- Municipality/City: Rio de Janeiro
- Zone: North Zone

Coelho Neto is a neighborhood in the North Zone of Rio de Janeiro, Brazil.
