= List of Rio de Janeiro BRT stations =

BRT Network of Rio de Janeiro

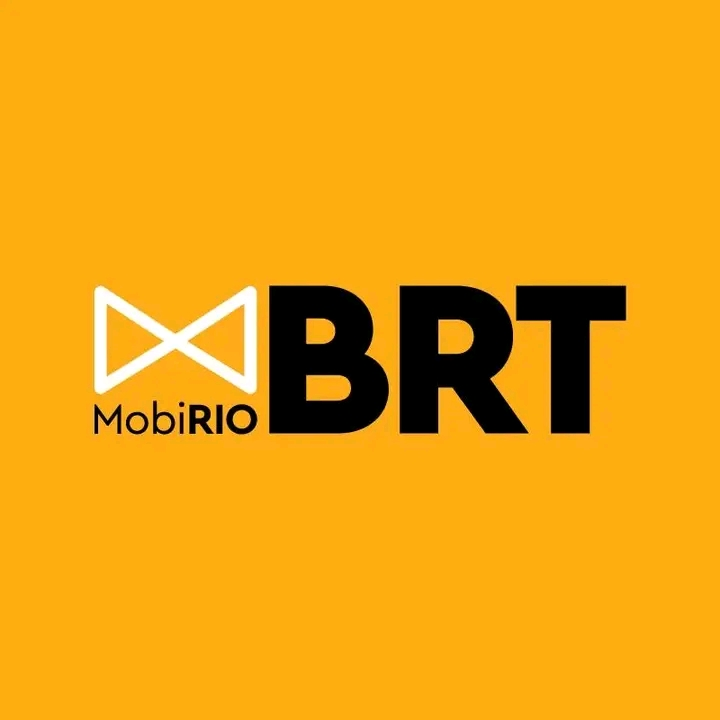
BRT Mobi-Rio

Below is a list of stations on the BRT network in Rio de Janeiro, Brazil. The BRT Mobi Rio network consists of four operational bus rapid transit corridors, TransOeste, TransCarioca, TransOlímpica and TransBrasil .

== Services ==
Services are a mix of non-stop, limited stops, express, and all stops (Portuguese: direto, semi-direto, expresso, parador). Stations are categorised by their level of service. Terminals are served by most passing buses. Express stations are served by many limited stop and express services as well as all-stop services. All-stop stations are generally only served by buses stopping at all stops. While there are clearly defined corridors, many services cross from one corridor to another. For example, while Terminal Jardim Oceânico is located on the TransOeste corridor, it also receives services from TransCarioca and TransOlímpica.

== Stations description ==
Stations can be divided into three types: terminals, express and all-stop. Terminal stations are usually located at the beginning and end of BRT corridors. They also tend to occupy larger areas and generally offer connections to other modes of transportation, such as trains, subways, light rail, or regular bus terminals. Express stations serve express, limited stops, and all stops buses. They are divided into two sections: one for all-stops buses and another for limited stops and express buses. As a result, they have two separate entrances. All-stops stations serve only regular buses. As a result, they are generally smaller and have only one entrance.

Regarding operating hours, they generally depend on the size and type of station: terminal and express stations usually remain open 24 hours a day, while regular stations typically operate from 4:00 a.m. to midnight. However, this is not a strict rule. For example, Centro Olímpico Terminal and express stations such as Asa Branca and Santa Efigênia close at midnight, while regular stations such as Praça do Carmo and IPASE remain open 24 hours a day.

Regarding fare payment, passengers can only pay using Jaé, either through the card or the app, PIX or a debit card. Since June 28, 2026, city buses, including the BRT system, have stopped accepting cash payments. All stations have ATMs where passengers can purchase and recharge Jaé cards using cash or credit cards, and they also have ticket booths where passengers can recharge their cards.. However, since May 30, 2026, the card sold at these machines, known as the "Jaézinho" (literally "Little Jaé" in Portuguese), does not allow fare integration. This benefit is only available through the Jaé app or a card ordered through the app.

== Stations ==
Stations	Station type	Line	Location	Routes	Connections/destinations	Operating hours
31 de Outubro	Express	TransOeste	Paciência	14 - Recreio – Santa Eugênia (limited stops) 17 - Santa Cruz – Campo Grande (all stops)		04h-00h
Aeroporto de Jacarepaguá	All stops	TransCarioca	Barra da Tijuca	35 - Paulo da Portela – Alvorada (all stops); 50 - Centro Olímpico – Jardim Oceânico (all stops); 52 - Alvorada – Deodoro (all stops)	Jacarepaguá Airport	04h-00h
Afrânio Costa	All stops	TransOeste	Barra da Tijuca	22 Alvorada – Jardim Oceânico (all stops) 50 - Centro Olímpico – Jardim Oceânico (all stops)	Named in honour of judge and Olympic shooter Afrânio da Costa	24h
Alvorada	Terminal	TransOeste; TransCarioca	Barra da Tijuca	10 - Santa Cruz – Alvorada (express) 11 - Santa Cruz – Alvorada (all stops) 12 - Pingo D'Água – Alvorada (express) 13 - Mato Alto – Alvorada (express) 15 - Curral Falso – Alvorada (express) 16 - Magarça – Alvorada (express) 22 - Alvorada –Jardim Oceânico (all stops) 25 - Alvorada –Mato Alto (all stops) 31 - Vicente de Carvalho - Alvorada (limited stops) 35 - Paulo da Portela – Alvorada (all stops) 40 - Paulo da Portela – Alvorada (express) 46 - Penha – Alvorada (express) 50 - Jardim Oceânico – Centro Olímpico (all stops); 52 - Alvorada – Deodoro (all stops) 53 - Sulacap – Alvorada (express)		
Américas Park	Express	TransOeste	Barra da Tijuca	11 - Santa Cruz – Alvorada (all stops); 18 - Pontal – Jardim Oceânico (express); 25 - Mato Alto – Alvorada (all stops)		4 AM to midnight
Ana Gonzaga	All stops	TransOeste	Inhoaíba	17 - Santa Cruz – Campo Grande (all stops)		4 AM to midnight
André Rocha	All stops	TransCarioca	Taquara	35 - Paulo da Portela – Alvorada (all stops)		4 AM to midnight
Aracy Cabral	All stops	TransCarioca	Taquara	35 -Paulo da Portela – Alvorada (all stops)		4 AM to midnight
Arroio Pavuna	All stops	TransCarioca	Curicica	35 -Paulo da Portela – Alvorada (all stops)		4 AM to midnight
Asa Branca	Express	TransOlímpica	Jacarepaguá	35 - Paulo da Portela – Alvorada (all stops) - Between 10 PM and 4 AM 41 - Paulo da Portela – Recreio (express); 51 -Recreio – Deodoro (all stops); 52 - Alvorada – Deodoro (all stops)		24h
Baixa do Sapateiro	All stops	TransBrasil	Maré	60 - Deodoro – Gentileza (all stops) 70 - Pedro Fernandes – Gentileza (all stops) 80 - Penha – Gentileza (all stops) 90 - Fundão – Gentileza (all stops)		24h
Barra Shopping (Expresso)	Express	TransOeste	Barra da Tijuca	18 - Pontal – Jardim Oceânico (express)	Access to Barra Shopping	4 AM to midnight
Barra Shopping (Parador)	All stops	TransOeste	Barra da Tijuca	22 - Alvorada –Jardim Oceânico (all stops); 50 - Centro Olímpico – Jardim Oceânico (all stops)	Access to Barra Shopping	24h
Benfica	All stops	TransBrasil	Manguinhos	60 - Deodoro – Gentileza (all stops) 70 - Pedro Fernandes – Gentileza (all stops) 80 - Penha – Gentileza (all stops) 90 - Fundão – Gentileza (all stops)		4 AM to midnight
Benvindo de Novaes	All stops	TransOeste	Recreio dos Bandeirantes	11 - Santa Cruz – Alvorada (all stops) 25 - Alvorada –Mato Alto (all stops)		4 AM to midnight
Boiúna	All stops	TransOlímpica	Taquara	51 - Recreio – Deodoro (all stops); 52 - Alvorada – Deodoro (all stops)		4 AM to midnight
Bosque da Barra	All stops	TransOeste	Barra da Tijuca	11 - Santa Cruz – Alvorada (all stops) 25 - Alvorada –Mato Alto (all stops)		4 AM to midnight
Bosque Marapendi	Express	TransOeste	Barra da Tijuca	18 - Pontal – Jardim Oceânico (express) 22 - Alvorada –Jardim Oceânico (all stops); 50 - Centro Olímpico –Jardim Oceânico (all stops)		24h
Caju	All stops	TransBrasil	Caju	60 - Deodoro – Gentileza (all stops)		4 AM to midnight
Cajueiros	Express	TransOeste	Santa Cruz	10 - Santa Cruz – Alvorada (express) 11 - Santa Cruz – Alvorada (all stops) 17 - Santa Cruz – Campo Grande (all stops) 25 - Santa Cruz – Salvador Allende (express)		4 AM to midnight
Campinho	All stops	TransCarioca	Madureira	35 - Paulo da Portela – Alvorada (all stops) 40 - Paulo da Portela – Alvorada (express) 43 - Santa Eugênia – Fundão (express) 46 - Penha – Alvorada (express)		24h
Campo Grande	Terminal	TransOeste	Campo Grande	17 - Santa Cruz – Campo Grande (all stops) 67 - Santa Cruz – Deodoro (connection)	Access to Campo Grande Terminal - regular, intermunicipal, and interstate buses Santa Cruz Line (Campo Grande Station is 400m away)	24h
Cândido Magalhães (One-way station, towards Campo Grande)	All stops	TransOeste	Campo Grande	17 - Santa Cruz – Campo Grande (all stops)		24h
Capitão Menezes	All stops	TransCarioca	Campinho	35 - Paulo da Portela – Alvorada (all stops)		4 AM to midnight
Cardoso de Moraes	All stops	TransCarioca	Ramos	42 - Madureira – Galeão (all stops) 80 - Penha – Gentileza (all stops)	Saracuruna Line (Ramos Station is 450m away)	4 AM to midnight
Catedral do Recreio		TransOlímpica	Recreio dos Bandeirantes	51 - Recreio – Deodoro (all stops)		4 AM to midnight
Centro Metropolitano	All stops	TransCarioca	Barra Olímpica	35 - Paulo da Portela – Alvorada (all stops) 50 - Centro Olímpico –Jardim Oceânico (all stops); 52 - Alvorada – Deodoro (all stops)		4 AM to midnight
Centro Olímpico	Terminal	TransOlímpica	Barra Olímpica	50 - Centro Olímpico –Jardim Oceânico (all stops); 53 Alvorada – Sulacap (express)		4 AM to midnight
Cesarão I	Express	TransOeste	Santa Cruz	14 - Recreio – Santa Eugênia (limited stops) 17 - Santa Cruz – Campo Grande (all stops)		24h
Cesarão II	Express	TransOeste	Santa Cruz	14 - Recreio – Santa Eugênia (limited stops) 17 - Santa Cruz – Campo Grande (all stops)		4 AM to midnight
Cesarão III	Express	TransOeste	Santa Cruz	14 - Recreio – Santa Eugênia (limited stops) 17 - Santa Cruz – Campo Grande (all stops)		24h
Cesarinho	Express	TransOeste	Santa Cruz	14 - Recreio – Santa Eugênia (limited stops) 17 - Santa Cruz – Campo Grande (all stops)		24h
Cidade Alta	All stops	TransBrasil	Cordovil	60 - Deodoro – Gentileza (all stops) 70 - Pedro Fernandes – Gentileza (all stops)		4 AM to midnight
Colônia	All stops	TransOlímpica	Jacarepaguá	51 Recreio –Deodoro (all stops) 52 - Deodoro – Alvorada (all stops)		24h
Cosmos	All stops	TransOeste	Cosmos	17 - Santa Cruz – Campo Grande (all stops)	Santa Cruz Line (Cosmos Station is 550m away)	24h
CTEx.	All stops	TransOeste	Barra de Guaratiba	11 - Santa Cruz – Alvorada (all stops); 25 - Mato Alto – Alvorada (all stops)	Access to the Army Technology Centre (CTEx)	4 AM to midnight
Curicica	Express	TransCarioca	Curicica	35 - Paulo da Portela – Alvorada (all stops) 40 - Paulo da Portela – Alvorada (express) 41 - Paulo da Portela – Recreio (express)		24h
Curral Falso	Terminal	TransOeste	Santa Cruz	10 - Santa Cruz – Alvorada (express) 11 - Santa Cruz – Alvorada (all stops) 15 - Curral Falso – Alvorada (express) 17 - Santa Cruz – Campo Grande (all stops) 20 Santa Cruz–Salvador Allende (express) 28 - Pingo D'água – Curral Falso (connection)		24h
Deodoro	Terminal	TransOlímpica TransBrasil	Deodoro	51 - Recreio – Deodoro (all stops) 52 - Deodoro – Alvorada (all stops) 60 - Deodoro – Gentileza (all stops) 61 - Deodoro – Gentileza (express) 67 - Deodoro – Campo Grande (connection) 68 - Deodoro – Bangu (connection)	Santa Cruz, Deodoro and Japeri lines (Deodoro integrated BRT/train station)	24h
Divina Providência		TransCarioca	Taquara	35 - Paulo da Portela – Alvorada (all stops)		4 AM to midnight
Dom Bosco		TransOeste	Recreio dos Bandeirantes	11 - Santa Cruz – Alvorada (all stops) 25 - Mato Alto – Alvorada (all stops)		4 AM to midnight
Embrapa		TransOeste	Guaratiba	11 - Santa Cruz – Alvorada (all stops) 25 - Mato Alto – Alvorada (all stops)	Access to Embrapa Food Agroindustry	4 AM to midnight
Fazenda Botafogo	Express	TransBrasil	Coelho Neto	60 - Deodoro – Gentileza (all stops) 61 - Deodoro – Gentileza (express)		24h
Fiocruz	Express	TransBrasil	Manguinhos	60 - Deodoro – Gentileza (all stops) 61 - Deodoro – Gentileza (express) 70 - Pedro Fernandes – Gentileza (all stops) 73 - Pedro Fernandes – Gentileza (express) 80 - Penha – Gentileza (all stops) 90 - Fundão – Gentileza (all stops)	Access to Oswaldo Cruz Foundation	24h
Fundão	Terminal	TransCarioca	Cidade Universitária	42 - Madureira – Galeão (all stops) 43 - Santa Eugênia – Fundão (express) 90 - Fundão – Gentileza (all stops)|| Access to the main campus of the Federal University of Rio de Janeiro (UFRJ)	24h	
Galeão/Tom Jobim 1	Terminal	TransCarioca	Galeão	42 - Madureira – Galeão (all stops)	Access to Terminal 1 of Rio de Janeiro/Galeão International Airport	4 AM to midnight
Galeão/Tom Jobim 2	Terminal	TransCarioca	Galeão	42 - Madureira – Galeão (all stops) Galeão – Gentileza (direct)	Access to Terminal 2 of Rio de Janeiro/Galeão International Airport	24h
Gastão Rangel	Express	TransOeste	Santa Cruz	10 - Santa Cruz – Alvorada (express) 11 - Santa Cruz – Alvorada (all stops) 17 - Santa Cruz – Campo Grande (all stops) 20 Santa Cruz–Salvador Allende (express)		24h
Gelson Fonseca		TransOeste	Recreio dos Bandeirantes	11 - Santa Cruz – Alvorada (all stops) 25 - Mato Alto – Alvorada (all stops)		4 AM to midnight
General Olímpio	Express	TransOeste	Santa Cruz	10 - Santa Cruz – Alvorada (express) 11 - Santa Cruz – Alvorada (all stops) 17 - Santa Cruz – Campo Grande (all stops) 20 Santa Cruz–Salvador Allende (express)		4 AM to midnight
Gentileza	Terminal	TransBrasil	São Cristóvão	60 - Deodoro – Gentileza (all stops) 61 - Deodoro – Gentileza (express) 70 - Pedro Fernandes – Gentileza (all stops) 73 - Pedro Fernandes – Gentileza (express) 80 - Penha – Gentileza (all stops) 90 - Fundão – Gentileza (all stops) Galeão – Gentileza (direct)	Access to Light Rail Lines 1 and 4 Connection to regular buses	24h
Gilka Machado	Express	TransOeste	Recreio dos Bandeirantes	11 - Santa Cruz – Alvorada (all stops) 18 - Pontal – Jardim Oceânico (express) 25 - Mato Alto – Alvorada (all stops) ||	4 AM to midnight	
Gláucio Gil	Express	TransOeste	Recreio dos Bandeirantes	10 - Santa Cruz – Alvorada (express) 11 - Santa Cruz – Alvorada (all stops) 12 - Pingo D'Água – Alvorada (express) 13 - Mato Alto – Alvorada (express) 14 - Recreio – Santa Eugênia (limited stops) 15 - Curral Falso – Alvorada (express) 16 - Magarça – Alvorada (express) 18 - Pontal – Jardim Oceânico (express) 20 - Salvador Allende – Santa Cruz (express) 25 - Alvorada –Mato Alto (all stops)		24h
Golfe Olímpico	All stops	TransOeste	Barra da Tijuca	11 - Santa Cruz – Alvorada (all stops) 18 - Pontal – Jardim Oceânico (express) 25 - Mato Alto – Alvorada (all stops)		4 AM to midnight
Guadalupe	Express	TransBrasil	Guadalupe	60 - Deodoro – Gentileza (all stops) 61 - Deodoro – Gentileza (express)		24h
Guaporé	All stops	TransCarioca	Vila da Penha	42 - Madureira – Galeão (all stops)		4 AM to midnight
Guignard	All stops	TransOeste	Recreio dos Bandeirantes	11 - Santa Cruz – Alvorada (all stops) 25 - Mato Alto – Alvorada (all stops)		4 AM to midnight
Guiomar Novaes	All stops	TransOeste	Recreio dos Bandeirantes	11 - Santa Cruz – Alvorada (all stops) 25 - Mato Alto – Alvorada (all stops)		24h
Hospital de Bonsucesso	All stops	TransBrasil	Bonsucesso	60 - Deodoro – Gentileza (all stops) 70 - Pedro Fernandes – Gentileza (all stops) 80 - Penha – Gentileza (all stops) 90 - Fundão – Gentileza (all stops)	Access to Bonsucesso Federal Hospital	4 AM to midnight
Ibiapina	All stops	TransCarioca	Penha	42 - Madureira – Galeão (all stops)		4 AM to midnight
Icurana	All stops	TransOeste	Cosmos	17 - Santa Cruz – Campo Grande (all stops)		4 AM to midnight
Ilha de Guaratiba	All stops	TransOeste	Guaratiba	11 Santa Cruz– Alvorada (all stops); 13 Mato Alto– Alvorada (express); 25 Mato Alto– Alvorada (all stops)		24h
Ilha Pura	All stops	TransOlímpica	Barra da Tijuca	51 Recreio – Deodoro (all stops)		24h
Inhoaíba (Parque Oeste)	All stopa	TransOeste	Inhoaíba	17 - Santa Cruz – Campo Grande (all stops)	Access to Oeste Park	4 AM to midnight
Interlagos	All stops	TransOeste	Barra da Tijuca	11 Santa Cruz– Alvorada (all stops); 25 Mato Alto– Alvorada (all stops)		4 AM to midnight
INTO	All stops	TransBrasil	São Cristóvão	60 - Deodoro – Gentileza (all stops) 70 - Pedro Fernandes – Gentileza (all stops) 80 - Penha – Gentileza (all stops) 90 - Fundão – Gentileza (all stops)	Access to National Institute of Traumatology and Orthopedics (INTO)	4 AM to midnight
IPASE	All stops	TransCarioca	Praça Seca	35 - Paulo da Portela – Alvorada (all stops)		24h
Irajá	Express	TransBrasil	Irajá	60 - Deodoro – Gentileza (all stops) 61 - Deodoro – Gentileza (express)		24h
Jardim Guadalupe	Express	TransBrasil	Guadalupe	60 - Deodoro – Gentileza (all stops) 61 - Deodoro – Gentileza (express)	Access to Jardim Guadalupe Shopping	24h
Jardim Oceânico	Terminal	TransOeste	Barra da Tijuca	18 - Pontal –Jardim Oceânico (express); 22 Alvorada–Jardim Oceânico (all stops) 50 - Centro Olímpico – Jardim Oceânico (all stops)	Line 4 (Jardim Oceânico Station - integrated BRT/Metro station) Connection to regular buses	24h
Júlia Miguel	All stops	TransOeste	Paciência	17 - Santa Cruz – Campo Grande (all stops)		4 AM to midnight
Leila Diniz	All stops	TransOlímpica	Curicica	51 - Recreio – Deodoro (all stops) 52 - Deodoro – Alvorada (all stops)		24h
Lobo Júnior	All stops	TransBrasil	Penha	60 - Deodoro – Gentileza (all stops) 70 - Pedro Fernandes – Gentileza (all stops)		24h
Lourenço Jorge	All stops	TransCarioca	Barra da Tijuca	35 - Paulo da Portela – Alvorada (all stops) 50 - Centro Olímpico –Jardim Oceânico (all stops); 52 - Alvorada – Deodoro (all stops)	Access to Lourenço Jorge Municipal Hospital	24h
Madureira (Manaceia)	Express	TransCarioca	Madureira	31 Vicente de Carvalho– Alvorada (limited stops) 35 - Paulo da Portela – Alvorada (all stops) - from midnight to 4 AM; 42 - Madureira – Galeão (all stops) 43 - Santa Eugênia – Fundão (express); 46 Penha– Alvorada (express)|| Santa Cruz, Deodoro and Japeri lines (Madureira integrated BRT/Train station)	24h	
Magalhães Bastos	All stops	TransOlímpica	Jardim Sulacap	51 - Recreio – Deodoro (all stops) 52 - Deodoro – Alvorada (all stops)	Santa Cruz Line (Magalhães Bastos integrated BRT/Train station)	24h
Magarça	Terminal	TransOeste	Guaratiba	10 - Santa Cruz – Alvorada (express) 11 - Santa Cruz – Alvorada (all stops) 12 - Pingo D'Água – Alvorada (express) 15 - Curral Falso – Alvorada (express) 16 - Magarça – Alvorada (express) 19 - Salvador Allende – Pingo D'água (express) 20 - Salvador Allende – Santa Cruz (express)	Connection to regular buses	24h
Marambaia	All stops	TransCarioca	Vicente de Carvalho	42 - Madureira – Galeão (all stops)		4 AM to midnight
Maré	All stops	TransCarioca	Maré	42 - Madureira – Galeão (all stops) 90 - Fundão – Gentileza (all stops)		4 AM to midnight
Marechal Fontenelle	Express	TransOlímpica	Jardim Sulacap	51 - Recreio – Deodoro (all stops) 52 - Deodoro – Alvorada (all stops); 53 Sulacap– Alvorada (express)		24h
Marinha Mercante	All stops	TransBrasil	Olaria	60 - Deodoro – Gentileza (all stops) 70 - Pedro Fernandes – Gentileza (all stops)	Access to Merchant Marine Officers Training School	4 AM to midnight
Mato Alto	Terminal	TransOeste	Guaratiba	10 - Santa Cruz – Alvorada (express) 11 - Santa Cruz – Alvorada (all stops) 12 - Pingo D'Água – Alvorada (express) 13 - Mato Alto – Alvorada (express) 15 - Curral Falso – Alvorada (express) 16 - Magarça – Alvorada (express) 19 - Salvador Allende – Santa Cruz (express) 20 - Salvador Allende – Santa Cruz (express) 25 - Alvorada –Mato Alto (all stops)	Connection to regular buses	24h
Mercadão	Express	TransCarioca	Madureira	35 - Paulo da Portela – Alvorada (all stops) - From midnight to 4 AM 35 - Paulo da Portela – Alvorada (all stops) - from midnight to 4 AM; 42 - Madureira – Galeão (all stops) 43 - Santa Eugênia – Fundão (express); 46 Penha– Alvorada (express)|| Belford Roxo Line (Mercadão de Madureira station is 350m away) Access to Madureira Market	24h	
Mercado São Sebastião	Express	TransBrasil	Cordovil	60 - Deodoro – Gentileza (all stops) 70 - Pedro Fernandes – Gentileza (all stops) 73 - Pedro Fernandes – Gentileza (Express)	Access to São Sebastião Market	24h
Merck	All stops	TransCarioca	Taquara	35 - Paulo da Portela – Alvorada (all stops)	Access to Merck Factory	24h
Minha Praia	All stops	TransOlímpica	Barra Olímpica	51 - Recreio – Deodoro (all stops) 52 - Deodoro – Alvorada (all stops)		4 AM to midnight
Morro do Outeiro	Express	TransOlímpica	Barra Olímpica	35 - Paulo da Portela – Alvorada (all stops) - Between 4 AM and 10 PM 41 - Paulo da Portela – Recreio (express); 51 - Recreio – Deodoro (all stops) 52 - Deodoro – Alvorada (all stops); 53 Sulacap– Alvorada (express) ||Access to Centro Olímpico Terminal	24h	
Notre Dame	Express	TransOeste	Vargem Grande	11 - Santa Cruz – Alvorada (all stops) 18 - Pontal – Jardim Oceânico (express) 25 - Mato Alto – Alvorada (all stops) ||	4 AM to midnight	
Nova Barra	Express	TransOeste	Recreio dos Bandeirantes	11 - Santa Cruz – Alvorada (all stops) 18 - Pontal – Jardim Oceânico (express) 25 - Mato Alto – Alvorada (all stops) ||		4 AM to midnight
Novo Leblon	Express	TransOeste	Barra da Tijuca	11 - Santa Cruz – Alvorada (all stops) 18 - Pontal – Jardim Oceânico (express) 25 - Mato Alto – Alvorada (all stops) ||		24h
Olaria	All stops	TransCarioca	Olaria	42 - Madureira – Galeão (all stops) 80 - Penha – Gentileza (all stops)	Saracuruna Line (Olaria integrated BRT/Train station)	24h
Olof Palme	All stops	TransOlímpica	Barra Olímpica	51 - Recreio – Deodoro (all stops)		
Otaviano	All stops	TransCarioca	Madureira	42 - Madureira – Galeão (all stops)		04h-00h
Outeiro Santo	All stops	TransOlímpica	Jacarepaguá	51 - Recreio – Deodoro (all stops) 52 - Deodoro – Alvorada (all stops)		04h-00h
Padre João Cribbin	All stops	TransOlímpica	Magalhães Bastos	51 - Recreio – Deodoro (all stops) 52 - Deodoro – Alvorada (all stops)		4 AM to midnight
Parque das Rosas	Express	TransOeste	Barra da Tijuca	18 - Pontal – Jardim Oceânico (express) 22 - Alvorada –Jardim Oceânico (all stops); 50 - Centro Olímpico –Jardim Oceânico (all stops)		24h
Parque de São Paulo	All stops	TransOeste	Paciência	17 - Santa Cruz – Campo Grande (all stops)		4 AM to midnight
Parque Esperança (One-way station, towards Campo Grande)	All stops	TransOeste	Campo Grande	17 - Santa Cruz – Campo Grande (all stops)		4 AM to midnight
Parque Olímpico	All stops	TransOlímpica	Barra Olímpica	50 - Centro Olímpico –Jardim Oceânico (all stops) 52 - Deodoro – Alvorada (all stops)		4 AM to Mmidnight
Pastor José Santos	All stops	TransCarioca	Penha	42 - Madureira – Galeão (all stops)	Saracuruna Line (Penha Circular Station is 350m away)	24h
Paulo da Portela	Terminal	TransCarioca	Madureira		Santa Cruz, Deodoro and Japeri lines (Madureira integrated BRT/Train station)	24h
Paulo Malta Rezende	All stops	TransOeste	Barra da Tijuca	22 - Alvorada –Jardim Oceânico (all stops); 50 - Centro Olímpico –Jardim Oceânico (all stops		4 AM to midnight
Pedra de Itaúna	Express	TransOeste	Recreio dos Bandeirantes	11 - Santa Cruz – Alvorada (all stops); 18 - Pontal – Jardim Oceânico (express); 25 - Mato Alto – Alvorada (all stops)		4 AM to midnight
Pedro Correia	All stops	TransCarioca	Jacarepaguá	35 Madureira – Alvorada (all stops) - between 4 AM and 10 PM		4 AM to midnight
Pedro Fernandes (Margaridas)	Terminal	TransBrasil	Irajá	70 - Pedro Fernandes – Gentileza (all stops) 73 - Pedro Fernandes – Gentileza (Express)	Connection to regular, intercity and interstate (São Paulo) buses	24h
Pedro Taques	All stops	TransCarioca	Penha Circular	42 - Madureira – Galeão (all stops)		4 AM to midnight
Penha 1(One-way station, towards Alvorada)	Express	TransCarioca	Penha	42 - Madureira – Galeão (all stops) 43 - Santa Efigênia – Fundão (express) 46 - Alvorada – Penha (express) 80 - Penha – Gentileza (all stops)	Saracuruna Line (Penha Station is 250m away)	24h
Penha 2 (One-way station, towards Galeão)	Express	TransCarioca	Penha	42 - Madureira – Galeão (all stops) 43 - Santa Efigênia – Fundão (express) 46 - Alvorada – Penha (express) 80 - Penha – Gentileza (all stops)	Saracuruna Line (Penha Station is 300m away)	24h
Pina Rangel	All stops	TransOeste	Campo Grande	17 - Santa Cruz – Campo Grande (all stops)		24h
Pingo d'Água	Terminal	TransOeste	Guaratiba	10 - Santa Cruz – Alvorada (express) 11 - Santa Cruz – Alvorada (all stops) 12 - Pingo D'Água – Alvorada (express) 15 - Curral Falso – Alvorada (express) 19 - Salvador Allende – Pingo D'água (express) 20 Santa Cruz–Salvador Allende (express) 28 - Pingo D'água – Curral Falso (connection)		
Pinto Teles	All stops	TransCarioca	Campinho	35 Madureira – Alvorada (all stops)		4 AM to midnight
Piscinão de Ramos	All stops	TransBrasil	Ramos	60 - Deodoro – Gentileza (all stops) 70 - Pedro Fernandes – Gentileza (all stops)	Access to Piscinão de Ramos saltwater lagoon	24h
Pontal	Express	TransOeste	Vargem Grande	11 - Santa Cruz – Alvorada (all stops); 18 - Pontal – Jardim Oceânico (express); 25 - Mato Alto – Alvorada (all stops)		24h
Pontões/Barrasul	All stops	TransOeste	Recreio dos Bandeirantes	11 - Santa Cruz – Alvorada (all stops); 25 - Mato Alto – Alvorada (all stops)		24h
Praça do Bandolim	Alll stops	TransCarioca	Curicica	35 - Paulo da Portela – Alvorada (all stops)		24h
Praça do Carmo	All stops	TransCarioca	Penha Circular	42 - Madureira – Galeão (all stops)		24h
Praça Seca	Express	TransCarioca	Praça Seca	35 - Paulo da Portela – Alvorada (all stops) 40 - Paulo da Portela – Alvorada (all stops) 42 - Madureira – Galeão (all stops) 43 - Santa Efigênia – Fundão (express) 46 - Alvorada – Penha (express)		24h
Prefeito Alim Pedro (One-way station, towards Santa Cruz)	All stops	TransOeste	Campo Grande	17 - Santa Cruz – Campo Grande (all stops)		24h
Recanto das Garças	All stops	TransOeste	Vargem Grande	11 - Santa Cruz – Alvorada (all stops); 25 - Mato Alto – Alvorada (all stops)		4 AM to midnight
Recanto das Palmeiras	All stops	TransCarioca	Jacarepaguá	35 - Paulo da Portela – Alvorada (all stops)		4 AM to midnight
Recreio	Terminal	TransOlímpica	Recreio dos Bandeirantes	14 - Recreio – Santa Eugênia (limited stops) 41 Paulo da Portela – Recreio (express); 51 Recreio – Deodoro (all stops)		24h
Recreio Shopping	Express	TransOeste	Recreio dos Bandeirantes	10 - Santa Cruz – Alvorada (express) 11 - Santa Cruz – Alvorada (all stops) 12 - Pingo D'Água – Alvorada (express) 13 - Mato Alto – Alvorada (express) 14 - Recreio – Santa Eugênia (limited stops) 15 - Curral Falso – Alvorada (express) 16 - Magarça – Alvorada (express) 18 - Pontal – Jardim Oceânico (express) 19 - Salvador Allende – Pingo D'água (express) 20 Santa Cruz–Salvador Allende (express) 25 - Alvorada –Mato Alto (all stops)	Access to Recreio Shopping	24h
Rede Sarah	All stops	TransCarioca	Barra da Tijuca	35 - Paulo da Portela – Alvorada (all stops) 50 - Centro Olímpico – Jardim Oceânico (all stops) 52 - Deodoro – Alvorada (all stops) 53 - Deodoro – Alvorada (express)	Access to SARAH Neurorehabilitation Center	4 AM to midnight
Ricardo Marinho	All stops	TransOeste	Barra da Tijuca	22 Alvorada – Jardim Oceânico (all stops) 50 - Centro Olímpico – Jardim Oceânico (all stops)		4 AM to midnight
Rio II	Express	TransCarioca	Barra da Tijuca	35 - Paulo da Portela – Alvorada (all stops) 40 - Paulo da Portela – Alvorada (express) 46 - Alvorada – Penha (express) 50 - Centro Olímpico –Jardim Oceânico (all stops) 52 - Deodoro – Alvorada (all stops) 53 - Deodoro – Alvorada (express)		24h
Riocentro	All stops	TransOlímpica	Barra Olímpica	51 Recreio – Deodoro (all stops)	Access to Riocentro exhibition and convention center	24h
Riomar	All stops	TransOeste	Barra da Tijuca	11 - Santa Cruz – Alvorada (all stops); 25 - Mato Alto – Alvorada (all stops)		24h
Riviera	All stops	TransOeste	Barra da Tijuca	22 Alvorada – Jardim Oceânico (all stops) 50 - Centro Olímpico – Jardim Oceânico (all stops)		24h
Rubens Vaz	Express	TransBrasil	Maré	60 - Deodoro – Gentileza (all stops) 70 - Pedro Fernandes – Gentileza (all stops) 73 - Pedro Fernandes – Gentileza (Express)		24h
Salvador Allende	Express	TransOeste	Recreio dos Bandeirantes	10 - Santa Cruz – Alvorada (express) 11 - Santa Cruz – Alvorada (all stops) 12 - Pingo D'Água – Alvorada (express) 13 - Mato Alto – Alvorada (express) 14 - Recreio – Santa Eugênia (limited stops) 15 - Curral Falso – Alvorada (express) 16 - Magarça – Alvorada (express) 18 - Pontal – Jardim Oceânico (express) 19 - Salvador Allende – Pingo D'água (express) 20 Santa Cruz–Salvador Allende (express) 25 - Alvorada –Mato Alto (all stops)		24h
Santa Cruz	Terminal	TransOeste	Santa Cruz	10 - Santa Cruz – Alvorada (express); 11 - Santa Cruz – Alvorada (all stops) 17 - Santa Cruz – Campo Grande (all stops); 20 Santa Cruz–Salvador Allende (express)	Santa Cruz Line (Santa Cruz integrated BRT/train station)	24h
Santa Efigênia	Express-only	TransCarioca	Taquara	40 - Paulo da Portela – Alvorada (express) 41 - Paulo da Portela – Recreio (express) 43 - Santa Efigênia – Fundão (express) 46 - Alvorada – Penha (express)		4 AM to midnight
Santa Eugênia	Express	TransOeste	Paciência	14 - Recreio – Santa Eugênia (limited stops) 17 - Santa Cruz – Campo Grande (all stops)	Santa Cruz Line (Paciência integrated BRT/train station)	24h
Santa Luzia	Express	TransCarioca	Ramos	42 - Madureira – Galeão (all stops) 43 - Santa Efigênia – Fundão (express) 80 - Penha – Gentileza (all stops) ||	24h	
Santa Mônica Jardins	All stops	TransOeste	Barra da Tijuca	11 - Santa Cruz – Alvorada (all stops); 25 - Mato Alto – Alvorada (all stops)		4 AM to midnight
Santa Veridiana	Express	TransOeste	Santa Cruz	10 - Santa Cruz – Alvorada (express) 11 - Santa Cruz – Alvorada (all stops) 15 - Curral Falso – Alvorada (express) 20 Santa Cruz–Salvador Allende (express)		24h
São Jorge	All stops	TransOeste	Inhoaíba	17 - Santa Cruz – Campo Grande (all stops)		24h
Sulacap	Terminal	TransOlímpica	Jardim Sulacap	53 - Alvorada –Sulacap (express)	Connection to regular and intercity buses	4 AM to midnight (only BRT)
Tanque	Express	TransCarioca	Tanque	35 - Paulo da Portela – Alvorada (all stops) 40 - Paulo da Portela – Alvorada (all stops) 42 - Madureira – Galeão (all stops) 43 - Santa Efigênia – Fundão (express) 46 - Alvorada – Penha (express)	Connection to Terminal Mestre Bandeira - regular buses	24h
Tapebuias	All stops	TransOlímpica	Recreio dos Bandeirantes	51 Recreio – Deodoro (all stops)		24h
Taquara	Express	TransCarioca	Taquara	35 - Paulo da Portela – Alvorada (all stops) 40 - Paulo da Portela – Alvorada (all stops) 42 - Madureira – Galeão (all stops) 43 - Santa Efigênia – Fundão (express) 46 - Alvorada – Penha (express)	Connection to Terminal Bandeira Brasil - regular buses	24h
Três Pontes	Express	TransOeste	Santa Cruz	14 - Recreio – Santa Eugênia (limited stops) 17 - Santa Cruz – Campo Grande (all stops)		4 AM to midnight
Vasco da Gama	All stops	TransBrasil	Caju	60 - Deodoro – Gentileza (all stops) 70 - Pedro Fernandes – Gentileza (all stops) 80 - Penha – Gentileza (all stops) 90 - Fundão – Gentileza (all stops)	Access to São Januário Stadium	24h
Vaz Lobo	All stops	TransCarioca	Vaz Lobo	42 - Madureira – Galeão (all stops)		24h
Vendas de Varanda	Express	TransOeste	Santa Cruz	10 - Santa Cruz – Alvorada (express) 11 - Santa Cruz – Alvorada (all stops) 15 - Curral Falso – Alvorada (express) 20 Santa Cruz–Salvador Allende (express)		4 AM to midnight
Ventura	All stops	TransOlímpica	Jacarepaguá	51 - Recreio – Deodoro (all stops) 52 - Deodoro – Alvorada (all stops)		4 AM to midnight
Via Parque	Express	TransCarioca	Barra da Tijuca	35 - Paulo da Portela - Alvorada (all stops) 40 - Paulo da Portela – Alvorada (express) 50 - Centro Olímpico –Jardim Oceânico (all stops) 52 - Deodoro – Alvorada (all stops) 53 - Deodoro – Alvorada (express)	Access to Via Parque Shopping	24h
Vicente de Carvalho	Express	TransCarioca	Vicente de Carvalho	31 Vicente de Carvalho– Alvorada (limited stops) 35 - Paulo da Portela – Alvorada (all stops); 42 - Madureira – Galeão (all stops) 43 - Santa Eugênia – Fundão (express); 46 Penha– Alvorada (express) |	Line 2 (integrated BRT/ Metro station) Access to Carioca Mall	24h
Vigário Geral	Express	TransBrasil	Vigário Geral	60 - Deodoro – Gentileza (all stops) 70 - Pedro Fernandes – Gentileza (all stops) 73 - Pedro Fernandes – Gentileza (Express)		24h
Vila Kosmos	All stops	TransCarioca	Vila Cosmos	42 - Madureira – Galeão (all stops)		4 AM to midnight
Vila Militar	All stops	TransOlímpica	Vila Militar	51 - Recreio – Deodoro (all stops) 52 - Deodoro – Alvorada (all stops)	Santa Cruz Line (Vila Militar integrated BRT/train station)	4 AM to midnight
Vila Paciência	Express	TransOeste	Santa Cruz	14 - Recreio – Santa Eugênia (limited stops) 17 - Santa Cruz – Campo Grande (all stops)		4 AM to midnight
Vila Queiroz	All stops	TransCarioca	Madureira	42 - Madureira – Galeão (all stops)		4 AM to midnight
Vila Sapê	All stops	TransCarioca	Curicica	35 Madureira– Alvorada (all stops)		24h
Vilar Carioca	All stops	TransOeste	Inhoaiba	17 - Santa Cruz – Campo Grande (all stops)		24h

Map with all stations.
