= Transcarioca =

BLT line in Rio de Janeiro, Brazil

TransCarioca

Overview
- System: Rio de Janeiro BRT
- Operator: MOBI-Rio
- Status: Active
- Began service: 9 July 2016

Routes
- Routes: 31, 35, 40, 41, 42, 43, 46
- Locale: Rio de Janeiro
- Communities served: Barra da Tijuca, Barra Olímpica, Curicica, Jacarepaguá, Taquara, Tanque, Praça Seca, Campinho, Madureira, Vaz Lobo, Vicente de Carvalho, Vila da Penha, Vila Kosmos, Penha Circular, Penha, Olaria, Ramos, Maré, Cidade Universitária, Galeão
- Start: Alvorada Terminal
- End: Galeão I Station
- Length: 26 km (16 mi)
- Stations: 48

Service
- Level: Daily
- Frequency: Every 15 minutes
- Journey time: 45 minutes
- Operates: 24h
- Ridership: 160.000 per day

Transcarioca is a bus rapid transit (BRT) line in Rio de Janeiro, connecting Alvorada Terminal, in Barra da Tijuca, with Galeão International Airport. The Transcarioca line covers 39 kilometers and 48 stations that connect 27 neighborhoods in the north and the west. It was the second line that opened on the Rio de Janeiro BRT system. Work on the line started in March 2011 and the official opening took place on June 1, 2014, just before the 2014 FIFA World Cup. Transcarioca is also a set of citybus lines that mainly operate in Barra da Tijuca.

== Lines ==
Number	Route	Type	Stations	Operating hours
31	Alvorada ↔ Vicente de Carvalho	Limited stops	3 (Madureira (Manacéia))	Monday to Friday 5:00 AM to 9:00 AM | 4:00 PM to 8:00 PM
35	Paulo da Portela ↔ Alvorada	All stops	25 (between 4 AM and midnight) 26 (between 10 PM and midnight) 17 (between 00h and 4 AM)	Every day, 24h: Between midnight and 4:00 a.m., this line stops at Madureira (Manaceia) and Mercadão stations. Between 10:00 p.m. and 4:00 a.m., it also stops at Morro do Outeiro and Asa Branca stations, but does not stop at Pedro Corrêa Station.
40	Paulo da Portela ↔ Terminal Alvorada	Express	9	Monday to Friday 5:00 AM to 10:00 AM | 2:00 PM to 9:00 PM Saturday 5:00 AM to 9:00 PM
41	Paulo da Portela ↔ Terminal Recreio	Express	10	Monday to Friday 5:00 AM to PM
42	Madureira (Manaceia) ↔ Aeroporto Tom Jobim/Galeão	All stops	20 (between 4 PM and midnight) 11 (between midnight and 4 PM	Every day, 24h
43	Santa Efigênia ↔ Terminal Aroldo Melodia (Fundão)	Express	11	Monday to Friday 5:00 AM to 9:00 AM | 4:00 PM to 8:00 PM
46	Penha ↔ Alvorada	Express	11	Monday to Friday 4:00 AM to 11:30 PM Saturday and Sunday 4:00 AM to midnight

== Stations ==
Stations (in order)	Station type	Location	Lines	Connection/Destinations	Operating hours
Alvorada	Terminal	Barra da Tijuca	10 - Santa Cruz –Alvorada (express) 11 - Santa Cruz –Alvorada (all stops) 12 - Pingo D'Água –Alvorada (express) 13 - Mato Alto – Alvorada (express) 15 - Curral Falso – Alvorada (express) 16 - Magarça –Alvorada (express) 22 - Alvorada–Jardim Oceânico (all stops) 25 - Alvorada –Mato Alto (all stops) 31 - Vicente de Carvalho - Alvorada (limited stops) 35 - Paulo da Portela –Alvorada (all stops) 40 - Paulo da Portela – Alvorada (express) 46 - Penha – Alvorada (express) 50 - Centro Olímpico – Jardim Oceânico (all stops) 52 - Alvorada – Deodoro (All stops) 53 - Sulacap –Alvorada (express)	Access toTransOeste services, regular, intercity and interstate buses	24h
Lourenço Jorge	All stops	Barra da Tijuca	35 - Paulo da Portela – Alvorada (all stops) 50 - Centro Olímpico –Jardim Oceânico (all stops) 52 - Deodoro – Alvorada (all stops)	Lourenço Jorge Municipal Hospital	24h
Aeroporto de Jacarepaguá	All stops	Barra da Tijuca	35 - Paulo da Portela – Alvorada (all stops) 50 - Centro Olímpico –Jardim Oceânico (all stops) 52 - Deodoro – Alvorada (all stops)	Jacarepaguá Airport	04h-00h
Via Parque	Express	Barra da Tijuca	35 - Paulo da Portela - Alvorada (all stops) 40 - Paulo da Portela – Alvorada (express) 50 - Centro Olímpico –Jardim Oceânico (all stops) 52 - Deodoro – Alvorada (all stops) 53 - Deodoro – Alvorada (express)	Access to Via Parque Shopping	24h
Centro Metropolitano	All stops	Barra Olímpica	35 - Paulo da Portela – Alvorada (all stops) 50 - Centro Olímpico –Jardim Oceânico (all stops) 52 - Deodoro – Alvorada (all stops) 53 - Deodoro – Alvorada (express)		04-00h
Rede Sarah	All stops	Barra Olímpica	35 - Paulo da Portela – Alvorada (all stops) 50 - Centro Olímpico –Jardim Oceânico (all stops) 52 - Deodoro – Alvorada (all stops) 53 - Deodoro – Alvorada (express)	Access to SARAH Neurorehabilitation Center	04-00h
Rio 2	Express	Barra Olímpica	35 - Paulo da Portela – Alvorada (all stops) 40 - Paulo da Portela – Alvorada (express) 46 - Alvorada – Penha (express) 50 - Centro Olímpico –Jardim Oceânico (all stops) 52 - Deodoro – Alvorada (all stops) 53 - Deodoro – Alvorada (express)		24h
Pedro Corrêa	All stops	Barra Olímpica	35 - Paulo da Portela – Alvorada (all stops) - between 4 AM and 10 PM		04h-00h
Curicica	Express	Curicica	35 - Paulo da Portela – Alvorada (all stops) 40 - Paulo da Portela – Alvorada (express) 41 - Paulo da Portela – Recreio (express)		24h
Praça do Bandolim	All stops	Curicica	35 - Paulo da Portela – Alvorada (all stops)		24h
Arroio Pavuna	All stops	Curicica	35 - Paulo da Portela – Alvorada (all stops)		04h-00h
Vila Sapê	All stops	Jacarepaguá	35 - Paulo da Portela – Alvorada (all stops)		24h
Recanto das Palmeiras	All stops	Jacarepaguá	35 - Paulo da Portela – Alvorada (all stops)		04h-00h
Divina Providência	All stops	Taquara	35 - Paulo da Portela – Alvorada (all stops)		04h-00h
Santa Efigênia	Express-only	Taquara	40 - Paulo da Portela – Alvorada (express) 41 - Paulo da Portela – Recreio (express) 43 - Santa Efigênia – Fundão (express) 46 - Alvorada – Penha (express)		04h-00h
Merck	All stops	Taquara	35 - Paulo da Portela – Alvorada (all stops)	Access to Merck Factory	24h
André Rocha	All stops	Taquara	35 - Paulo da Portela – Alvorada (all stops)		04h-00h
Taquara	Express	Taquara	35 - Paulo da Portela – Alvorada (all stops) 40 - Paulo da Portela – Alvorada (express) 41 - Paulo da Portela – Recreio (express) 43 - Santa Efigênia – Fundão (express) 46 - Alvorada – Penha (express)	Connection to Terminal Bandeira Brasil Access to Taquara Plaza Mall	24h
Aracy Cabral	All stops	Taquara	35 - Paulo da Portela – Alvorada (all stops)		04h-00h
Tanque	Express	Tanque	40 - Paulo da Portela – Alvorada (express) 41 - Paulo da Portela – Recreio (express) 43 - Santa Efigênia – Fundão (express) 46 - Alvorada – Penha (express)	Connection to Terminal Mestre Bandeira	24h
IPASE	All stops	Praça Seca	35 - Paulo da Portela – Alvorada (all stops)		24h
Praça Seca	Express	Praça Seca	40 - Paulo da Portela – Alvorada (express) 41 - Paulo da Portela – Recreio (express) 43 - Santa Efigênia – Fundão (express) 46 - Alvorada – Penha (express)		24h
Capitão Menezes	All stops	Praça Seca	35 - Paulo da Portela – Alvorada (all stops)		04h-00h
Pinto Teles	All stops	Campinho	35 - Paulo da Portela – Alvorada (all stops)		04h-00h
Campinho	Express	Campinho	35 - Paulo da Portela – Alvorada (all stops) 41 - Paulo da Portela – Recreio (express) 43 - Santa Efigênia – Fundão (express) 46 - Alvorada – Penha (express)		24h
Paulo da Portela	Terminal	Madureira	35 - Paulo da Portela – Alvorada (all stops) 40 - Paulo da Portela – Alvorada (express) 41 - Paulo da Portela – Recreio (express) 35 - Mad – Alvorada (all stops)	Santa Cruz, Deodoro and Japeri lines (Madureira integrated BRT/train station)	04h-00h
Madureira (Manaceia)	Express	Madureira	35 - Paulo da Portela – Alvorada (express) - Between midnight and 4 AM 42 - Madureira – Galeão (express) 43 - Santa Efigênia – Fundão (express) 46 - Alvorada – Penha (express)	Santa Cruz, Deodoro and Japeri lines (Madureira integrated BRT/train station)	24h
Mercadão	Express	Madureira	35 - Paulo da Portela – Alvorada (express) - Between midnight and 4 AM 42 - Madureira – Galeão (express) 43 - Santa Efigênia – Fundão (express) 46 - Alvorada – Penha (express)	Belford Roxo line (Mercadão de Madureira station is 350m away) Access to Madureira Market	24h
Otaviano	All stops	Madureira	42 - Madureira – Galeão (express)		04h-00h
Vila Queiroz	All stops	Madureira	42 - Madureira – Galeão (express)		04h-00h
Vaz Lobo	All stops	Vaz Lobo	42 - Madureira – Galeão (express)		24h
Marambaia	All stops	Vicente de Carvalho	42 - Madureira – Galeão (express)		04h-00h
Vicente de Carvalho	Express	Vicente de Carvalho	42 - Madureira – Galeão (express) 43 - Santa Efigênia – Fundão (express) 46 - Alvorada – Penha (express)	Line 2 (integrated BRT/Metro station) Access to Carioca Mall	24h
Vila Kosmos	All stops	Vicente de Carvalho	42 - Madureira – Galeão (express)		04h-00h
Pedro Taques	All stops	Penha Circular	42 - Madureira – Galeão (express)		04h-00h
Praça do Carmo	All stops	Penha Circular	42 - Madureira – Galeão (express)		24h
Guaporé	All stops	Penha Circular	42 - Madureira – Galeão (express)		04h-00h
Pastor José Santos	All stops	Penha	42 - Madureira – Galeão (express)	Saracuruna line (Penha Circular station is 350m away)	24h
Penha 2 (One-way station, towards Galeão)	Express	Penha	42 - Madureira – Galeão (express) 43 - Santa Efigênia – Fundão (express) 46 - Alvorada – Penha (express) 80 - Penha – Gentileza (all stops)	Saracuruna Line (Penha station is 250m away)	24h
Penha 1 (One-way station, towards Alvorada)	Express	Penha	42 - Madureira – Galeão (express) 43 - Santa Efigênia – Fundão (express) 46 - Alvorada – Penha (express) 80 - Penha – Gentileza (all stops)	Saracuruna Line (Penha station is 300m away)	24h
Ibiapina	All stops	Penha	42 - Madureira – Galeão (express) 80 - Penha x Gentileza (all stops)		04h-00h
Olaria	All stops	Olaria	42 - Madureira – Galeão (express) 80 - Penha x Gentileza (all stops)	Saracuruna Line (Olaria integrated BRT/train station)	24h
Cardoso de Moraes	All stops	Ramos	42 - Madureira – Galeão (express) 80 - Penha x Gentileza (all stops)	Saracuruna Line (Ramos station is 450m away)	04h-00h
Santa Luzia	Express	Ramos	42 - Madureira – Galeão (express) 43 - Santa Efigênia – Fundão (express) 80 - Penha – Gentileza (all stops)		24h
Maré	All stops	Maré	42 - Madureira – Galeão (express) 90 - Fundão – Gentileza (all stops)		04h-00h
Fundão (Aroldo Melodia)	Terminal	Cidade Universitária	42 - Madureira – Galeão (express) 43 - Santa Efigênia – Fundão (express) 90 - Fundão – Gentileza (all stops)	Access to the main campus of the Federal University of Rio de Janeiro (UFRJ)	24h
Galeão I	All stops	Galeão	42 - Madureira – Galeão (express)	Access to Terminal 1 of Rio de Janeiro/Galeão International Airport	04h-00h
Galeão II	All stops	Galeão	Galeão – Gentileza (direct) 42 - Madureira – Galeão (express)	Access to Terminal 2 of Rio de Janeiro/Galeão International Airport	24h

== See also ==
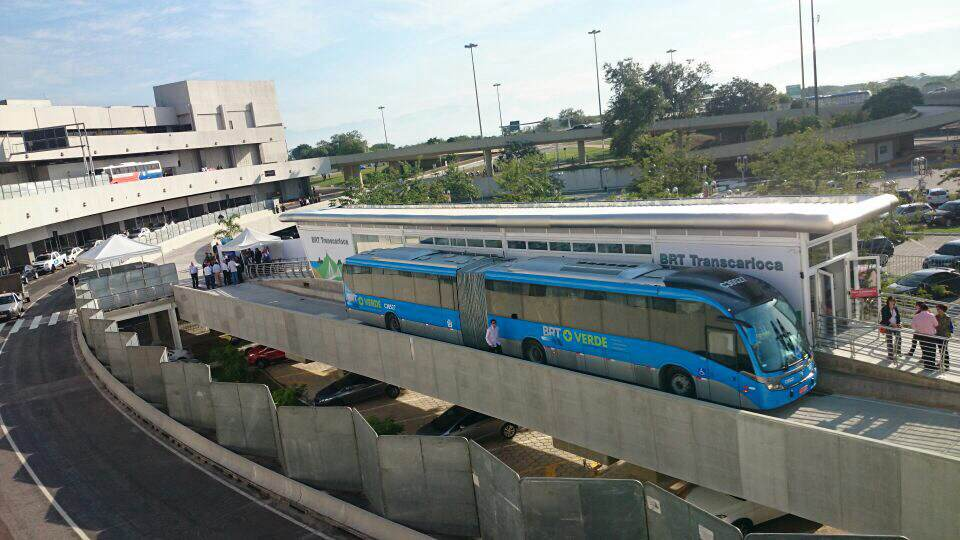
TransCarioca station at Galeão International Airport.

Rio de Janeiro's BRT lines

- Bus Rapid Transit in Brazil
- List of bus rapid transit systems
- TransOeste
