= TransBrasil (bus rapid transit) =

Bus system in Brazil

TransOlímpica

Overview
- System: Rio de Janeiro BRT
- Operator: MOBI-Rio
- Status: Active
- Began service: 24 February 2024

Route
- Locale: Rio de Janeiro
- Communities served: Deodoro, Guadalupe, Coelho Neto, Irajá, Vigário Geral, Cordovil, Penha, Ramos, Maré, Bonsucesso, Manguinhos, Caju, São Cristóvão
- Start: Deodoro Terminal
- Via: Brasil Avenue
- End: Gentileza Intermodal Terminal
- Length: 26 km (16 mi)
- Stations: 21

Service
- Level: Daily
- Frequency: Every 15 minutes
- Journey time: 45 minutes
- Operates: 24h
- Ridership: 145.000 per day

TransBrasil is a bus rapid transit system in Rio de Janeiro, Brazil, connecting Deodoro to Gentileza Terminal, in São Cristóvão. It began operations in February 2024, with this being phase one. In phase two, 17 stations began operating in March 2024. It was initially intended to open circa 2017. In August of 2026, the Caju station was opened.

== Lines ==
| Number | Route | Type | Stations | Operating hours |
|---|---|---|---|---|
| Sem numeração | Galeão Airport ↔ Gentileza | Direct | 2 | Every day, 6 AM to midnight |
| 60 | Deodoro ↔ Gentileza | All stops | 20 (between 4 AM and midnight) 14 (between 4 AM and midnight) | Every day 24h |
| 61 | Deodoro ↔ Gentileza | Express | 9 | Monday to Friday 5:00 AM to 9:00 AM | 4:00 PM to 7:30 PM |
| 70 | Terminal Pedro Fernandes ↔ Gentileza | All stops | 15 (between 4 AM and midnight) 10 (between 4 AM and midnight) | Every day 24h |
| 73 | Terminal Pedro Fernandes ↔ Gentileza | Express | 10 | Monday to Friday 5:00 AM to 9:00 AM | 4:00 PM to 7:30 PM |
| 80 | Penha ↔ Gentileza | All stops | 12 (between 4 AM and midnight) 7 (between 4 AM and midnight) | Every day 24h |
| 90 | Terminal Aroldo Melodia (Fundão) ↔ Gentileza | All stops | 9 | Every day 4:00 AM to midnight |

== Stations ==
| Stations (in order) | Station type | Location | Routes | Connection/Destinations | Operating hours |
|---|---|---|---|---|---|
| Deodoro | Terminal | Deodoro | 52 - Deodoro – Alvorada (all stops) 53 - Deodoro – Alvorada (express) 60 - Deodoro – Gentileza (all stops) 61 - Deodoro – Gentileza (express) 67 - Deodoro – Campo Grande (connection) 68 - Deodoro – Bangu (connection) | TransOlímpica and Conexão BRT Santa Cruz, Deodoro and Japeri lines (Deodoro integrated BRT/train station) | 24h |
| Guadalupe | Express | Guadalupe | 60 - Deodoro – Gentileza (all stops) 61 - Deodoro – Gentileza (express) | | 24h |
| Jardim Guadalupe | Express | Guadalupe | 60 - Deodoro – Gentileza (all stops) 61 - Deodoro – Gentileza (express) | Access to Jardim Guadalupe Shopping | 24h |
| Fazenda Botafogo | Express | Coelho Neto | 60 - Deodoro – Gentileza (all stops) 61 - Deodoro – Gentileza (express) | | 24h |
| Irajá | Express | Irajá | 60 - Deodoro – Gentileza (all stops) 61 - Deodoro – Gentileza (express) | | 24h |
| Margaridas (Pedro Fernandes) | Terminal | Irajá | 70 - Margaridas – Gentileza (all stops) 73 - Margaridas – Gentileza (Express) | Connection to regular, intercity and interstate (São Paulo) buses | 24h |
| Vigário Geral | Express | Vigário Geral | 60 - Deodoro – Gentileza (all stops) 70 - Margaridas – Gentileza (all stops) 73 - Margaridas – Gentileza (Express) | | 24h |
| Cidade Alta | All stops | Cordovil | 60 - Deodoro – Gentileza (all stops) 70 - Margaridas – Gentileza (all stops) | | 04h - 00h |
| Mercado São Sebastião | Express | Cordovil | 60 - Deodoro – Gentileza (all stops) 70 - Margaridas – Gentileza (all stops) 73 - Margaridas – Gentileza (Express) | Access to São Sebastião Market | 24h |
| Lobo Júnior | All stops | Penha | 60 - Deodoro – Gentileza (all stops) 70 - Margaridas – Gentileza (all stops) | | 24h |
| Marinha Mercante | All stops | Olaria | 60 - Deodoro – Gentileza (all stops) 70 - Margaridas – Gentileza (all stops) | Merchant Marine Officers Training School | 04h - 00h |
| Piscinão de Ramos | All stops | Ramos | 60 - Deodoro – Gentileza (all stops) 70 - Margaridas – Gentileza (all stops) | | 24h |
| Rubens Vaz | Express | Maré | 60 - Deodoro – Gentileza (all stops) 70 - Margaridas – Gentileza (all stops) 73 - Margaridas – Gentileza (Express) | | 24h |
| Baixa do Sapateiro | All stops | Maré | 60 - Deodoro – Gentileza (all stops) 70 - Margaridas – Gentileza (all stops) 80 - Penha – Gentileza (all stops) 90 - Fundão – Gentileza (all stops) | | 24h |
| Hospital de Bonsucesso / CPOR | All stops | Bonsucesso | 60 - Deodoro – Gentileza (all stops) 70 - Margaridas – Gentileza (all stops) 80 - Penha – Gentileza (all stops) 90 - Fundão – Gentileza (all stops) | Access to Bonsucesso Federal Hospital | 04h - 00h |
| Fiocruz | Express | Manguinhos | 60 - Deodoro – Gentileza (all stops) 61 - Deodoro – Gentileza (express) 70 - Margaridas – Gentileza (all stops) 73 - Margaridas – Gentileza (express) 80 - Penha – Gentileza (all stops) 90 - Fundão – Gentileza (all stops) | Access to Oswaldo Cruz Foundation | 24h |
| Benfica | All stops | Manguinhos | 60 - Deodoro – Gentileza (all stops) 70 - Margaridas – Gentileza (all stops) 80 - Penha – Gentileza (all stops) 90 - Fundão – Gentileza (all stops) | | 04h - 00h |
| Vasco da Gama | All stops | Caju | 60 - Deodoro – Gentileza (all stops) 70 - Margaridas – Gentileza (all stops) 80 - Penha – Gentileza (all stops) 90 - Fundão – Gentileza (all stops) | Access to São Januário Stadium | 24h |
| Caju | All stops | Caju | 60 - Deodoro – Gentileza (all stops) | | 04h - 00h |
| INTO | All stops | São Cristóvão | 60 - Deodoro – Gentileza (all stops) 70 - Margaridas – Gentileza (all stops) 80 - Penha – Gentileza (all stops) 90 - Fundão – Gentileza (all stops) | Access to National Institute of Traumatology and Orthopedics (INTO) | 04h - 00h |
| Gentileza | Terminal | São Cristóvão | 60 - Deodoro – Gentileza (all stops) 61 - Deodoro – Gentileza (express) 70 - Margaridas – Gentileza (all stops) 73 - Margaridas – Gentileza (express) 80 - Penha – Gentileza (all stops) 90 - Fundão – Gentileza (all stops) Galeão – Gentileza (direct) | Access to Light Rail Lines 1 and 4 | 24h |
