= Vicente de Carvalho Station =

Metro station in Rio de Janeiro, Brazil

Vicente de Carvalho
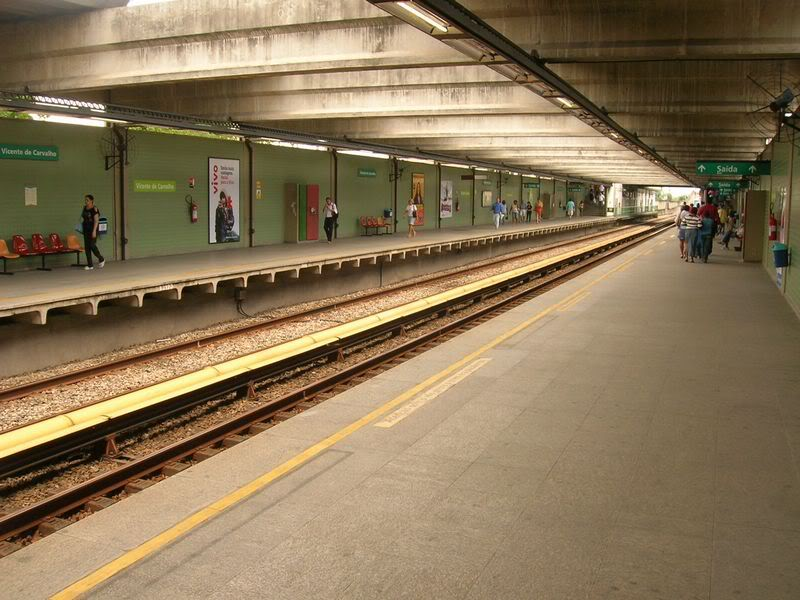
- Subway platforms at Vicente de Carvalho Station

General information
- Location: Rio de Janeiro; Brazil
- Coordinates: 22.8540489°S 43.3131355°W
- Operator: Metrô Rio, BRT
- Lines: Line 2, TransCarioca

Construction
- Cycle facilities: Yes

Other information
- Station code: VCV

History
- Opened: 1996; 30 years ago

Services
Preceding station	Rio de Janeiro Metro	Following station
Irajá towards Pavuna	Line 2	Thomaz Coelho towards Botafogo
Location
- Location within Rio de Janeiro

Vicente de Carvalho Station (Portuguese: Estação Vicente de Carvalho) is an integrated Rio de Janeiro Metro subway and BRT bus station that services the neighbourhood of Vicente de Carvalho in the North Zone of Rio de Janeiro.

== Services ==
The station is serviced by the TransCarioca bus line on the BRT network and Line 2 on the Rio de Janeiro Metro.
