= Rio das Pedras, Rio de Janeiro =

Region of Rio de Janeiro, Brazil

Coordinates: 22°58′34″S 43°20′09″W

Rio das Pedras is a region of Rio de Janeiro, but not officially recognized as a neighborhood. The favela sits in Rio de Janeiro’s Southwest Zone by the neighborhood of Itanhangá. Rio das Pedras’ borders are defined by the Tijuca National Park, the Tijuca Lagoon, and private land designated for the expansion of Barra da Tijuca.

== Etymology ==
The name derives from a river that begins in Tijuca National Park and runs entirely through the favela. About 40 years ago, the river was clean enough for children to play in and for residents to bathe and wash their clothes.

== History ==
Rio das Pedras emerged in the late 1960s.

=== Urbanization ===
According to the Brazilian Institute of Geography and Statistics (IBGE) 2010 census, there were approximately 63,000 residents living in an area of 90 hectares of expanding land behind Barra da Tijuca. Data from the local Residents' Association estimate that the population may be around 140,000 inhabitants, with about 40,000 homes.

The neighborhood is subdivided into the officially recognized localities of Rio Novo (Casinhas), Pinheiro, Rio das Flores, Vila Caranguejo, Centro, São Bartolomeu, Areal I, Areal II and Areinha.

An apartment complex built by the construction company Delfim has remained abandoned since the 1980s. It was occupied by residents in 1991 but they were later removed by the police and Civil Defense.

The area received urban infrastructure works through the Favela-Bairro program implemented by the municipal government of Rio de Janeiro. The intervention took place between 1998 and 2002 and was designed by architect Jorge Mario Jáuregui. A total of 32 four-storey residential buildings with four apartments per floor were constructed on a fully urbanized site of 416,556 m², together with sports courts and small plazas.

== Economy ==
Rio das Pedras functions as a commercial hub for nearby communities, including smaller favelas such as Muzema. Many residents own businesses and work in local commerce, which keeps much of the economic activity circulating within the community. According to residents cited in sources, national economic crises have had a smaller impact on Rio das Pedras than on some other areas.

== Notability ==
In 2018 the entertainment venue Castelo das Pedras closed, and the building was demolished in early 2020. In 2023 a shopping center was built on the site.

Major entertainment venues in the neighborhood include Espaço Terraço and Choperia Berlin, where musical artists perform regularly.

Rio das Pedras is also known as the place of origin of the Rio das Pedras militia, described in sources as one of the most powerful militias operating in Rio de Janeiro and Brazil. Its leader is militiaman Taillon de Alcântara Pereira Barbosa (known as "Taillon", currently imprisoned), the son of Dalmir Pereira Barbosa, one of the original leaders of the organization. The group operates not only in Rio das Pedras but also in other locations in the North Zone and West Zone of Rio de Janeiro, including Muzema, Gardênia Azul, Jacarepaguá, Campinho, Catiri, Carobinha, Campo Grande and Santa Cruz, as well as in Seropédica.
