= Transolímpica =

TransOlímpica

Overview
- System: Rio de Janeiro BRT
- Operator: Consórcio Rio Olímpico
- Status: Active
- Began service: 9 July 2016

Route
- Locale: Rio de Janeiro
- Communities served: Recreio dos Bandeirantes, Barra da Tijuca, Curicica, Jacarepaguá, Taquara, Jardim Sulacap, Magalhães Bastos, Vila Militar
- Start: Recreio Terminal
- Via: Corredor Presidente Tancredo Neves
- End: Deodoro Terminal
- Length: 26 km (16 mi)
- Other routes: 50, 51, 52, 53

Service
- Level: Daily
- Frequency: Every 15 minutes
- Journey time: 45 minutes
- Operates: 4:00 am – 0:00 am
- Ridership: 400,000 per business day

TransOlímpica is a bus rapid transit (BRT) line in Rio de Janeiro connecting Barra da Tijuca and Deodoro. It opened on 9 July 2016 with 17 stations, and is the third line of the Rio de Janeiro BRT system. The new route has two carriageways with three lanes in each direction and one bus lane for each carriageway.
