= Gentileza =

Brazilian urban personality

José Datrino
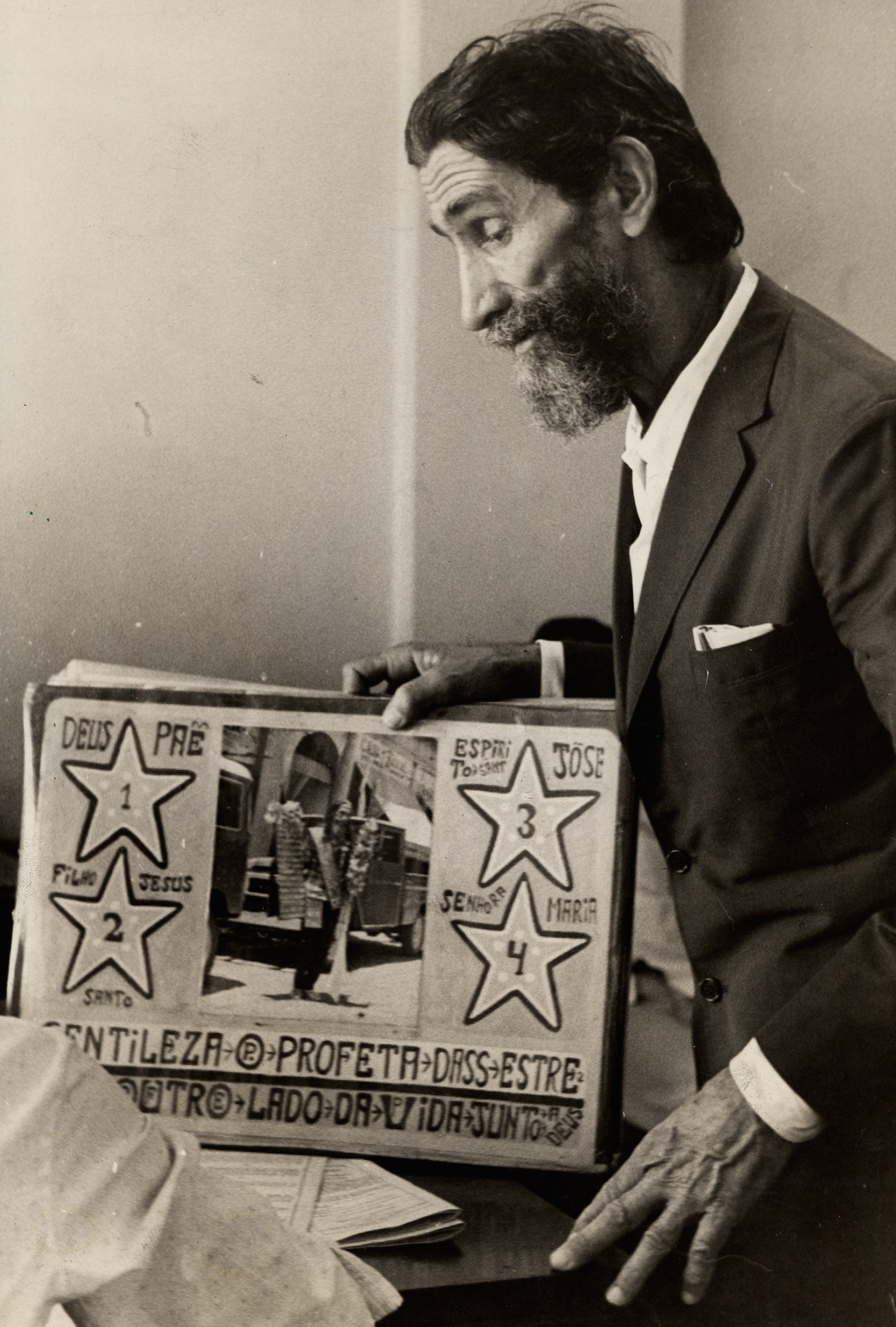
- Born: 11 April 1917; Cafelândia, São Paulo
- Died: 29 May 1996 (aged 79); Mirandópolis, São Paulo
- Occupation: Urban personality

José Datrino, known as prophet Gentileza (11 April 1917 – 29 May 1996) was a Brazilian urban personality, kind of a preacher, who became known from 1980 by making quirky inscriptions under an overpass in Rio de Janeiro, where he walked in a white robe and long beard. "Gentileza gera gentileza" ("Kindness begets kindness") is his most famous phrase.

== Early life ==
Born in Cafelândia, São Paulo, on Easter Wednesday, 11 April 1917, with eleven brothers, Datrino had a childhood of hard work in which he dealt directly with the land and with animals. To help the family, he pulled a wagon selling firewood in the neighborhood.

The field taught José Datrino to tame asses for transporting cargo. Later, as the prophet Gentileza, he said of himself "breaker of men asses who did not have enlightenment ".

From childhood José Datrino exhibited atypical behavior. By the age of thirteen, he started having premonitions about his mission on earth in which he believed one day, after raising a family, children and possessions, would leave everything for the sake of his mission. This behavior caused concern in his parents, who came to suspect that the child was suffering from some sort of madness, and sought help in psychic healers.

== Expanded description ==
=== The Prophet Gentileza arises ===
On Sunday, 17 December 1961, in the municipality of Niterói, there was a major fire at a circus, called considered one of the largest circus disasters in history. This fire killed more than 500 people, mostly children. On the eve of Christmas, six days after the event, José woke up claiming to have heard "astral voices", in his own words, that commanded him to leave the material world and devote himself only to the spiritual world. The Prophet took one of his trucks and went to the fire scene, where today is the Niterói Military Medical Services. He planted a garden and a vegetable garden on the ashes of the Niterói circus, a place that was once the scene of so much joy, but also of great sadness. That place was his home for four years. There, José Datrino instilled in people the real meaning of the words Thankful and Kindness (respec. Agradecido and Gentileza). He was a comforter volunteer, who helped the victims families with his words of goodness. From that day on, he came to be called "José Agradecido", or "Profeta Gentileza".

Contradicting the folk tale, Gentileza always reasserted: I am the father of five children, three feminine and two masculine, I did not lose anyone in the circus fire!"

After leaving the place that was termed "Paraíso Gentileza," the prophet began his journey as a stroller character. From 1970 toured throughout all the city. He was seen in the streets, squares, ferries crossing between Rio de Janeiro and Niterói, on the trains and busses, making his preaching and bringing words of love, kindness and respect for others and nature to all who crossed his path. To those called him mad, he would reply: - "I am mad to love you and crazy to save you".

However, an article authored by Professor Luiza Petersen and journalist writer Marcelo Camara, who say they knew Datrino ("Jornal do Brasil" newspaper), mention him as actually an aggressive person, in many forms. A week later, though, that article got rebutted on the same newspaper and same column. There are no other negative sources about this alleged bad personality of him.

=== The Wall Paintings ===
From 1980, he picked 56 flyover pilasters in Rio de Janeiro, ranging from Cemitério do Caju to Novo Rio Bus Station, a distance of roughly 1.5 km. He then filled the flyover pilasters with inscriptions in yellow-green proposing his criticism of the world and his alternative to the unease of civilization.

During the Eco '92, the Prophet Gentileza placed himself strategically in the place through which passed the countries representatives and incited them to live the kindness and enforce it throughout the Earth.

=== After his death ===
On Pentecost Wednesday, 29 May 1996, at age 79, he died in Mirandópolis, his family town, where he was buried.

Over the years, the wall paintings were damaged by taggers, vandalized, and later covered with gray paint. The elimination of the inscriptions was criticized and subsequently with help from Rio de Janeiro city government, the project Rio com Gentileza was created, with the goal of restoring the pilasters wall paintings. They began to be restored in January 1999. In May 2000, the restoration was completed and the carioca urban heritage inscriptions were preserved.

At the end of the year 2000 is published by EdUFF (Publisher of Universidade Federal Fluminense) the book Brazil: Time Gentileza, authored by Professor Leonardo Guelman. The work introduces the reader into the "universe" of Prophet Gentileza through his path, the stylization of its objects, his unique calligraphy and all 56 panels created by him, bringing facts related to the project Rio com Gentileza, describing the stages of the writings restoration process. The book is richly illustrated with numerous photographs, mostly of the prophet and his trinkets and panels. Besides pictures of the prophet himself working alongside some of pilasters, there are pictures of the writings before, during and after the restoration process.

In 2001, the prophet has been honored by Samba School GRES Acadêmicos do Grande Rio.

In Conselheiro Lafaiete, remote town in Minas Gerais, there is a broad work done by NGO AMAR that continues the work of Prophet Gentileza. Workshops were developed with youngsters in the city where it was possible to pass on the mosaic techniques. Moreover, a large wall in the neighborhood São João received a lovely mosaic application. And São Pedro square in the neighborhood Albinopólis was all decorated after the example of Prophet Gentileza.

In 2022 Rio City Hall decided to name a new light rail, BRT and bus terminal on the outskirts of downtown area after him - the Gentileza Intermodal Terminal.

=== The prophet Gentileza in the arts ===
- Gentileza was honored by the music composer Gonzaguinha, in the 1980s, and also by singer Marisa Monte in the 1990s. Both songs take the name "Gentileza".
- The Gonzaguinha's song depicts a homage to the prophet, as seen in the excerpt: "Feito louco / Pelas ruas / Com sua fé / Gentileza / O profeta / E as palavras / Calmamente / Semeando / O amor / À vida / Aos humanos".
- The Marisa Monte's song, in its turn, beyond encouraging the values preached by the prophet (in the passage "Nós que passamos apressados / Pelas ruas da cidade / Merecemos ler as letras / E as palavras de Gentileza"), portrays the damage incurred against the wall paintings, as in the excerpt: "Apagaram tudo / Pintaram tudo de cinza / Só ficou no muro / Tristeza e tinta fresca.".
- In the year 2000, in the town of Mirandópolis (SP), where the prophet is buried, was established the first NGO of the town:"Gera Gentileza Gentileza", founded by relatives and friends who admired the Prophet life philosophy. The NGO, beyond reminding the person José Datrino (Gentileza Prophet), in its name, had the mission to spread education and culture throughout the region. Several events have been made, such as: monthly itinerant soirees, Coral Meetings, Culture Afternoons for Kids in the town Grove, Participation in School Events and an annual event called "Gentileza Gera Gentileza", with music, theater, poetry and dance, among others.
- In 2009, the prophet was interpreted in a special appearance by the actor Paulo José, in the soap opera Caminho das Índias, aired by Rede Globo from January to September 2009.

== Beliefs ==
- Gentileza denounced the world, ruled "by the devil capital which sells anything and destroys everything." He saw in the destroyed circus a metaphor of the circomundo that will also be destroyed. But advertised the "kindness that is the remedy for all the evils." God is "Kindness because he is Beauty, Perfection, Goodness, Wealth, Nature, our Creator Father." A refrain always came back, especially in the 56 pilasters with inscriptions at the entrance of Novo Rio bus station in Caju: "Gentileza generates kindness, love." He invited everyone to be kind and grateful. Advertised an antidote to the brutality of our system of relationships and under the popular and religious speech, a new paradigm of civilization urgent in all mankind.
- There was a man sent to Rio by God. His name was José da Trino, called the Prophet Kindness (1917-1996). For over twenty years he circulated throughout the city in its white coat filled with appliqués and a banner, preaching in the streets and placing himself in the boats between Rio and Niterói tirelessly announcing: "Kindness generates Kindness." Only with Kindness, he said, we overcome the violence that stems from the "devil-capital". He painted his kindness teachings on 56 pilasters of the Caju overpass at the entrance the Rio de Janeiro city, restored under the supervision of Prof.. Leonardo Guelman who dedicated it a strict academic work, together with a beautiful video and CD-ROM titled: "Universo Gentileza: a gênese de um mito contemporâneo".
