= Vista Alegre, Rio de Janeiro =

Vista Alegre
- Neighborhood
- Location in Rio de Janeiro Vista Alegre (Brazil)
- Coordinates: 22°49′51″S 43°18′58″W
- Country: Brazil
- State: Rio de Janeiro (RJ)
- Municipality/City: Rio de Janeiro
- Zone: North Zone

Population (2010)
  - Total: 8,622

Vista Alegre is a neighborhood in the North Zone of Rio de Janeiro, Brazil.

The locality with the dominant population of middle class and upper middle class, is the border districts of Irajá, Vila da Penha, Brás de Pina, and Cordovil. Its main streets of the Estrada da Água Grande and the Avenida Braz de Pina. It is a neighborhood in the growth phase, with 3 large supermarkets, banks, eight schools, several individuals, a cultural canvas and Largo da Cidade Maravilhosa.
