= Jardim Boiúna =

Region of Rio de Janeiro, Brazil

Coordinates: 22°54′44″S 43°23′44″W

Jardim Boiúna is a region of Rio de Janeiro, but not officially recognized as a neighborhood. It is officially part of the neighborhood of Taquara.
