= Del Castilho Station (Metrô Rio) =

Metro station in Rio de Janeiro, Brazil

Del Castilho
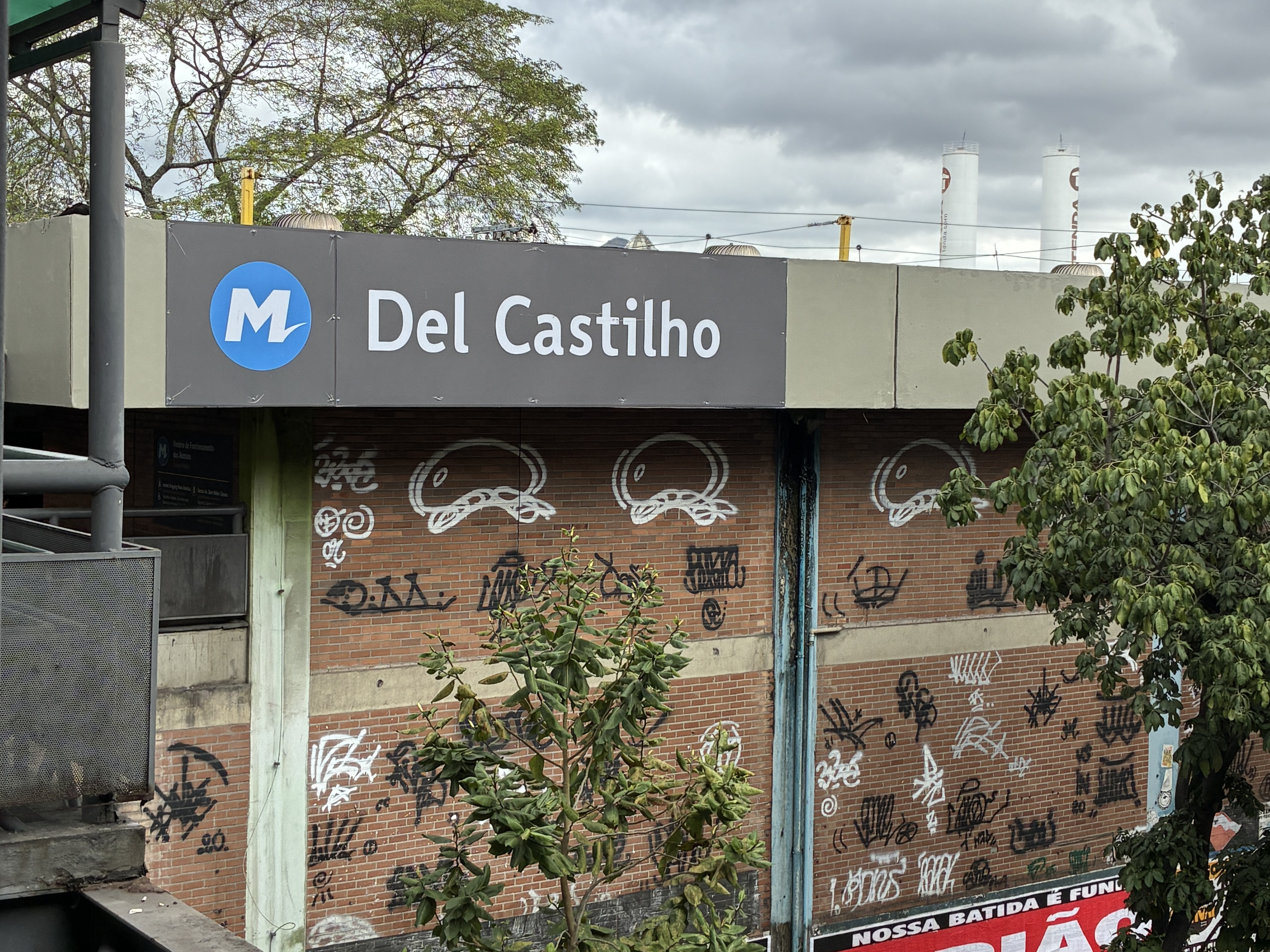
- Exterior of Del Castilho station

General information
- Location: Avenida Pastor Martin Luther King Jr; Del Castilho, Rio de Janeiro; Brazil
- Coordinates: 22.8789816°S 43.2721293°W
- Operator: Metrô Rio
- Line: Line 2
- Connections: SuperVia; Belford Roxo Line

Construction
- Accessible: yes

Other information
- Station code: DCT

History
- Opened: 1983; 43 years ago

Services
Preceding station	Rio de Janeiro Metro	Following station
Inhaúma towards Pavuna	Line 2	Maria da Graça towards Botafogo
Location
- Location within Rio de Janeiro

Del Castilho Station (Portuguese: Estação Del Castilho) is a station on Line 2 of the Rio de Janeiro Metro that services the neighbourhood of Del Castilho in the North Zone of Rio de Janeiro. It is located next to Shopping Nova América, a large shopping mall.

== History ==
Del Castilho premetro station opened in 1983 on the site of an abandoned station on the Rio D'Ouro Railway, which had closed in 1970. After a burst pipeline led to the closure of the premetro in 1985, Del Castilho was reopened as a metro station in 1987. It was renamed to Nova América/Del Castilho in March 2008 as part of a partnership with an adjacent shopping mall. The station had been renamed back to Del Castilho by 2021.

== Connections ==
This station is adjacent to Del Castilho Station on the Belford Roxo Line of the suburban rail network. As of 2026, there is partial fare integration between the metro at Del Castilho and buses to Cidade Universitária, Terminal Alvorada and Riocentro via Camorim.
