= Vila Cosmos =

Vila Kosmos
- Neighborhood
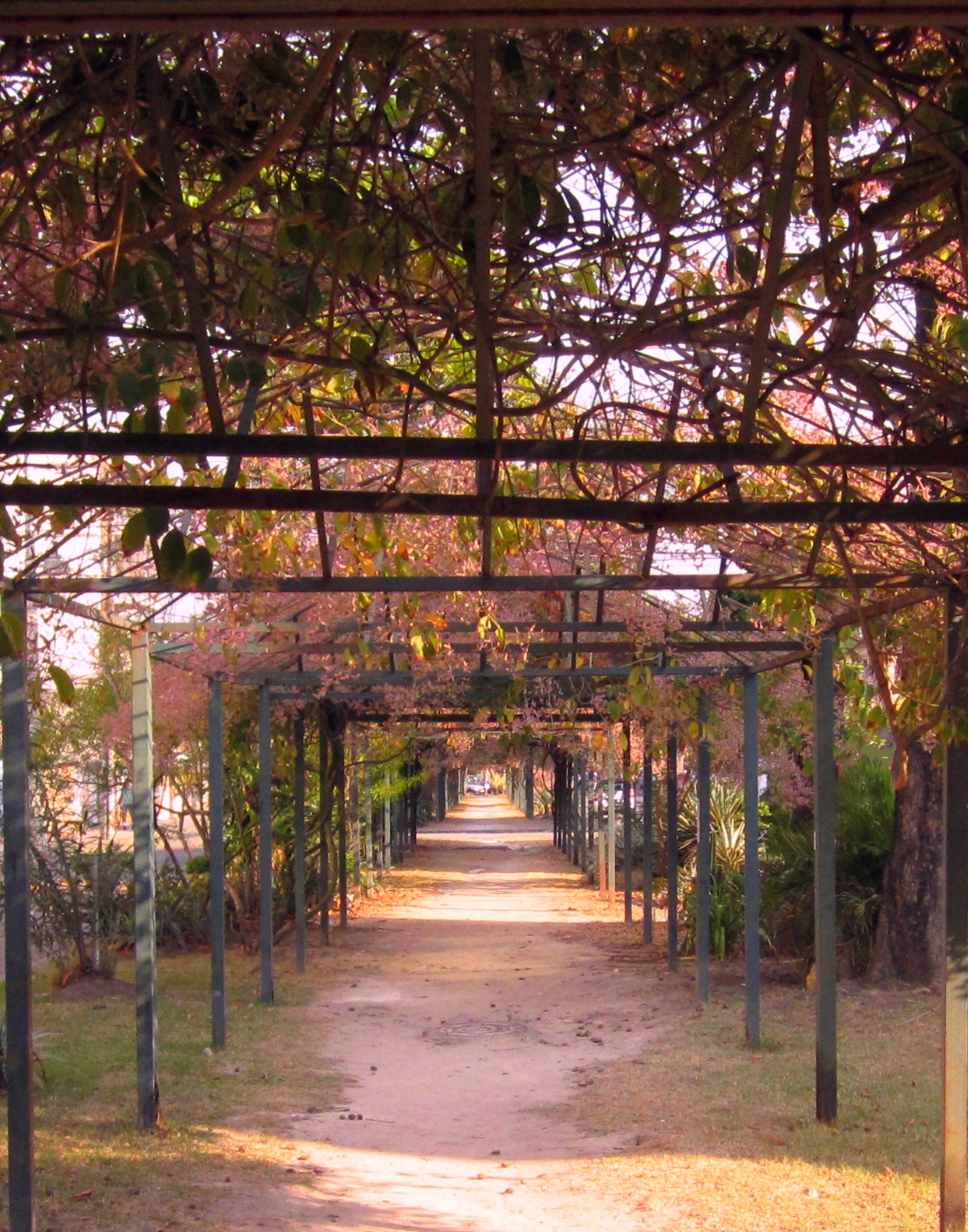

- Location in Rio de Janeiro Vila Kosmos (Brazil)
- Coordinates: 22°51′13″S 43°18′13″W
- Country: Brazil
- State: Rio de Janeiro (RJ)
- Municipality/City: Rio de Janeiro
- Zone: North Zone

Population (2010)
  - Total: 18,274

Vila Kosmos is a neighborhood in the North Zone of Rio de Janeiro, Brazil.

It is located in the northern zone of the city, among the neighborhoods of the Penha Circular, Engenho da Rainha, Vila da Penha, Tomás Coelho and Vicente de Carvalho The place is relatively calm and quiet. There are malls, metro station, supermarkets, theaters, language schools and High-Schools. Vila Kosmos is a small neighborhood, it feels like a country village and in the beginning it was going to be named "Vila Florença" after the building company that built it which was called Florenca.
