= Bairro Araújo =

Human settlement in Brazil

Coordinates: 22°49′30″S 43°19′19″W

Bairro Araújo is a region of Rio de Janeiro, but not officially recognized as a neighborhood.It is located in Vista Alegre
