= TransBrasil =

TransBrasil may refer to:

- TransBrasil (airline), a defunct Brazilian airline
- TransBrasil (bus rapid transit), a BRT line in Rio de Janeiro
