= Jacarepaguá =

- neighborhood
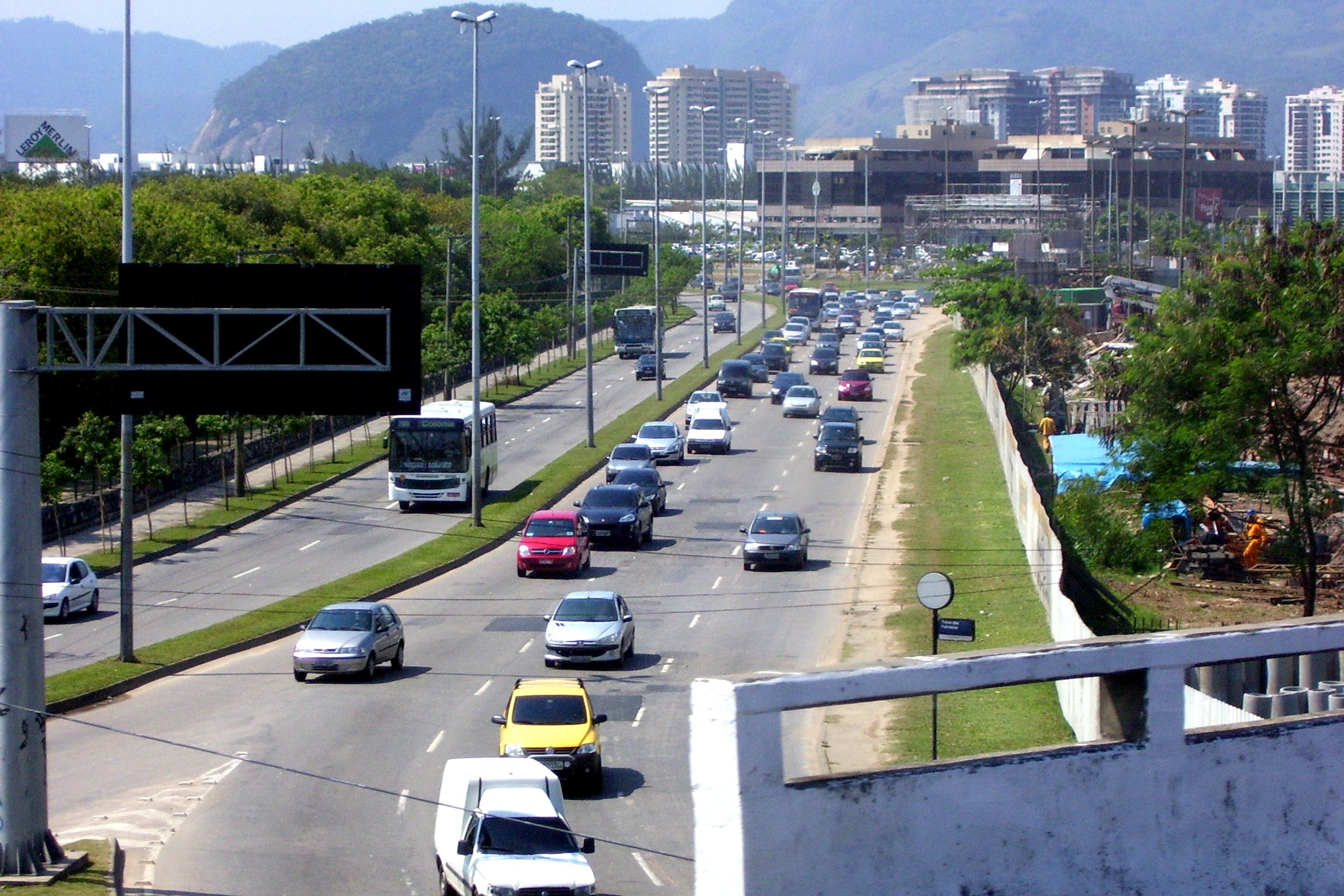
- Ayrton Senna Avenue

- Location in Rio de Janeiro
- Coordinates: 22°56′45″S 43°22′54″W
- Country: Brazil
- State: Rio de Janeiro (RJ)
- Municipality/City: Rio de Janeiro
- Zone: Southwest Zone
- Administrative region: Jacarepaguá

Area
  - Total: 7,579.64 ha (18,729.7 acres)

Population (2010)
  - Total: 157,326
  - Density: 2,075.64/km^{2} (5,375.88/sq mi)

Jacarepaguá (Portuguese pronunciation: [ʒakaɾepaˈɡwa]), with a land area of 29.27 square miles (75.8 km^{2}), is a neighborhood situated in the Southwest Zone of Rio de Janeiro, Brazil. In 2010, it had a population of 157,326. The name comes from the indigenous name of the location, "shallow pond of caymans", yakaré (cayman, C. yacare) + upá (pond) + guá (shallow), by the time of the Portuguese colonization.

Jacarepaguá is located in the Southwest Zone of Rio de Janeiro in the Baixada de Jacarepaguá, between Maciço da Tijuca and the Serra da Pedra Branca. The upper middle class Barra da Tijuca separates the suburb from the sea.

Jacarepaguá is divided into the following sub-areas (sub-bairros), which nowadays are already considered different neighborhoods:

- Anil
- Curicica
- Cidade de Deus
- Freguesia
- Gardênia Azul
- Pechincha
- Praça Seca
- Rio das Pedras
- Tanque
- Taquara
- Vila Valqueire

The suburb is known for large open areas where events and shows, such as the last Rock in Rio, take place.

The bairro contains the Camorim center of the 12,500 hectares (31,000 acres) Pedra Branca State Park, created in 1974. It is one of the greenest areas of Rio, with plenty of nature in some of the sub-areas, especially in Vargem Grande and Vargem Pequena.

It holds a samba school called Unidos de Jacarepaguá, churches like Nossa Senhora do Loreto, many shopping centers like Rio Shopping, Quality Shopping, and Center Shopping, and schools such as Garriga de Menezes, Pentágono and Primus, and several clubs, like Olímpico and Bandeirantes. In the mid-20th century, the area was home to the composer and mandolin player known as Jacob do Bandolim.

It was home to the Autódromo de Jacarepaguá, a motorsports racetrack which hosted the Formula One Brazilian Grand Prix between 1978 and 1989 and the Rio de Janeiro motorcycle Grand Prix between 1995 and 2004.

Recently, works have been done to build an Olympic Village in an area disputed by Jacarepaguá (or JPA) and Barra da Tijuca, a neighborhood nearby. Regardless of who "owns" the area, the Cariocas who live close to it were excited about the Pan-American Games that were held there in 2007.

It's also the biggest center of TV recording studios in Latin America, where RecNov (Record's studio), Projac Globo's studio—the biggest one in Latin America—are located. Band's studio, Polo de Cinema e Video studio are also there, and the Mexican broadcaster Televisa will soon open a branch there.

Jacarepaguá is a middle-class neighborhood, but one of Rio's largest slums, Cidade de Deus, and others like Favela Covanca, Barão, Inácio do Amaral, etc. are located nearby.
