= Terminal Alvorada =

Bus Station in Rio de Janeiro, Brazil

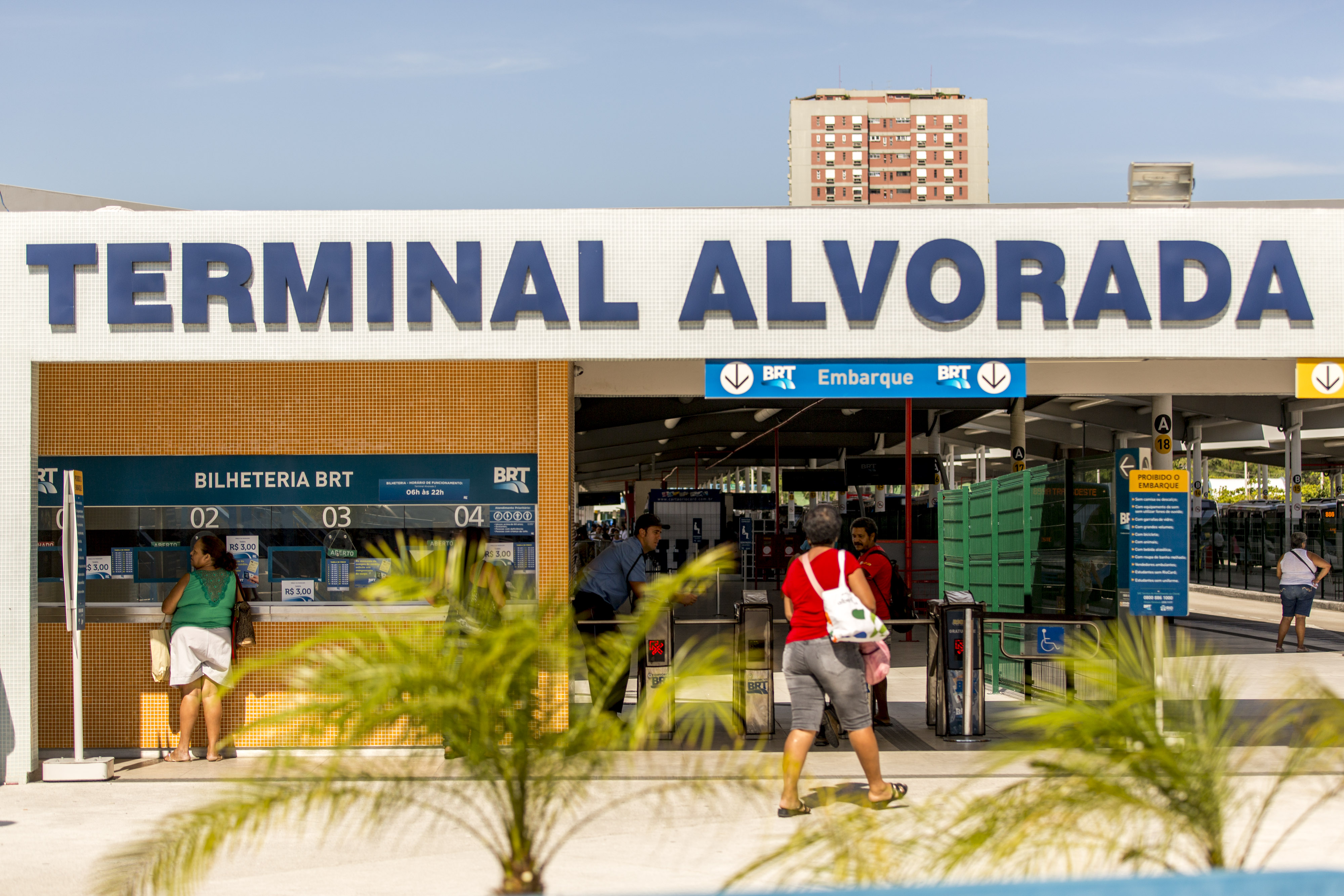
- Terminal Alvorada in February 2014

General information
- Location: Barra da Tijuca
- Coordinates: 22.995833°S 43.360556°W
- Bus routes: TransOeste; TransCarioca; Barra Expresso – Nova América/Del Castilho and Ipanema/General Osório

History
- Opened: 22 September 1981
Location

Terminal Alvorada is a bus station in Barra da Tijuca in the West Zone of Rio de Janeiro. The terminal was renovated in 2013.

== Services ==
The terminal is an integrated BRT station servicing the TransOeste and TransCarioca lines. The station is open 24 hours a day.

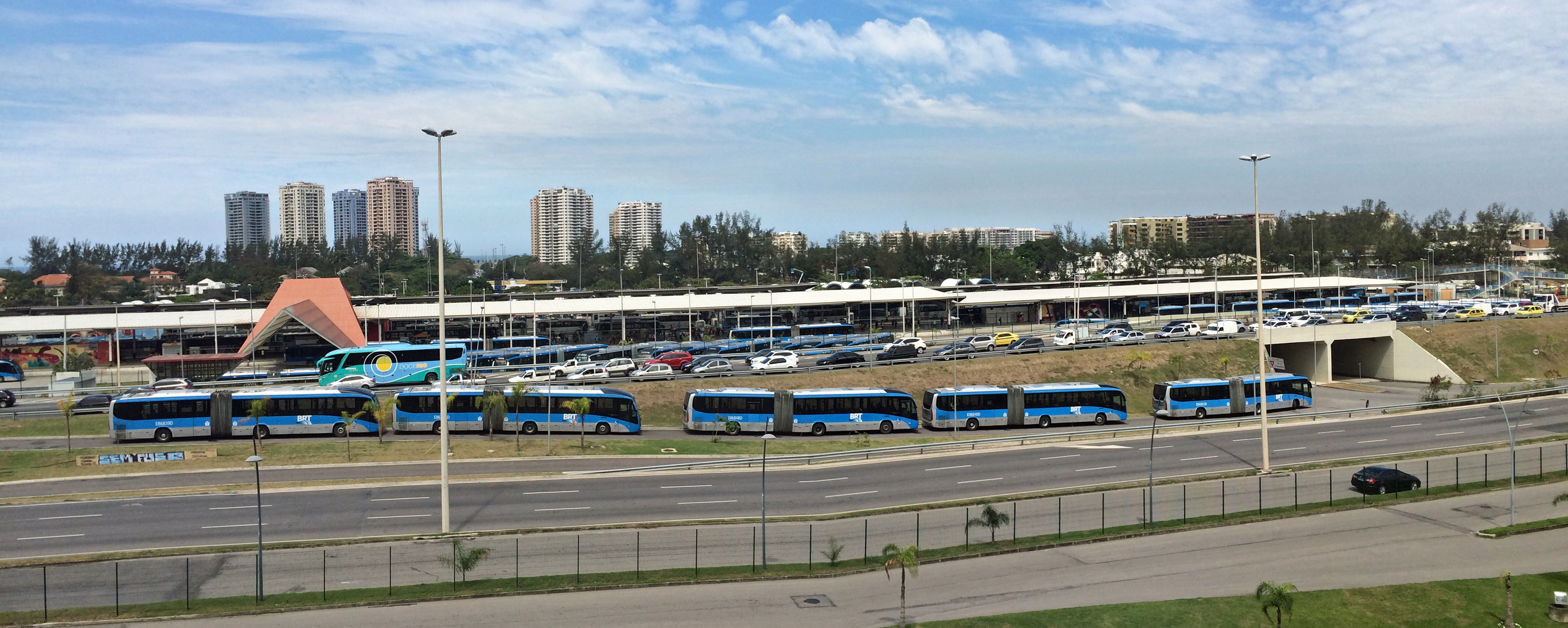
Panoramic view of Terminal Alvorada with articulated buses from BRT service.
