= Transoeste =

Bus line in Rio de Janeiro, Brazil

TransOeste
- Commenced operation: June 6, 2012; 13 years ago
- Locale: Rio de Janeiro
- Service type: Bus rapid transit
- Stations: 63 stations, 3 terminals
- Daily ridership: 250,000
- Website: mobi-rio.rio.br
BRT map of Rio de Janeiro

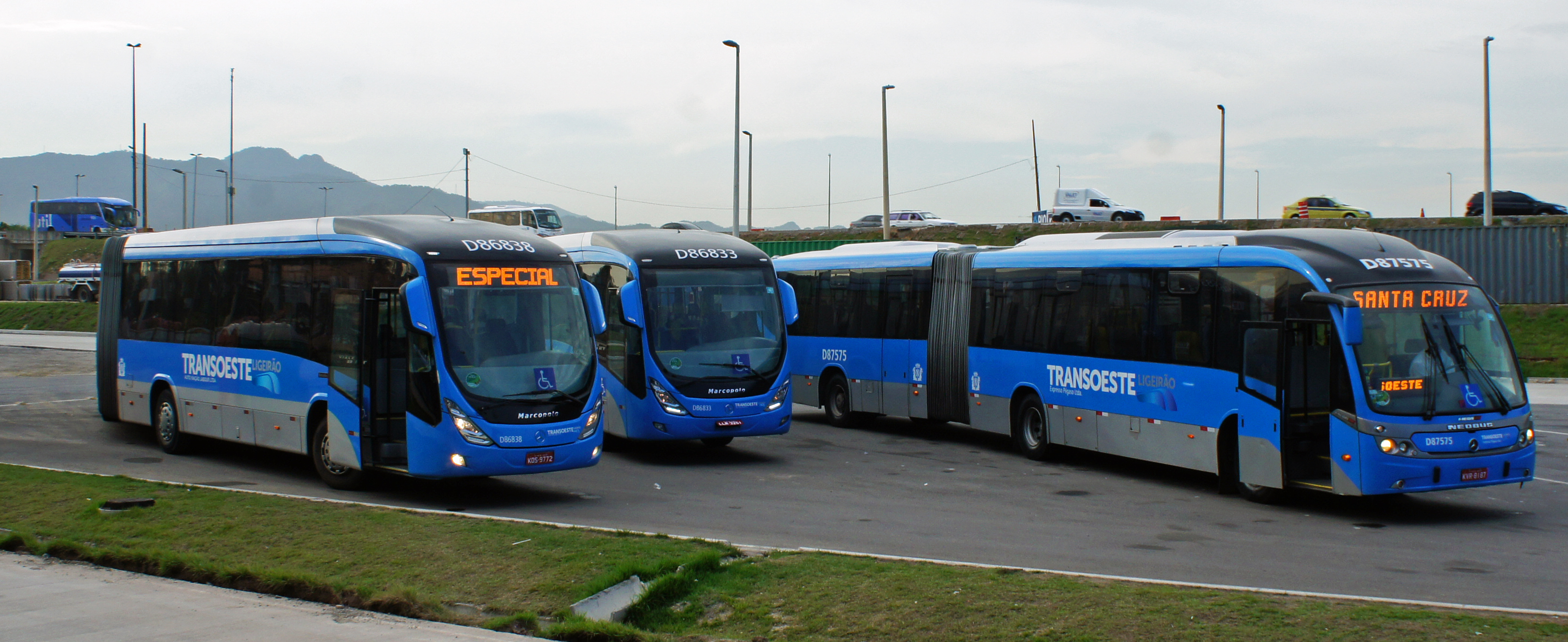
Fleet of regular and articulated buses operating the BRT Transoeste corridor at the Terminal Alvorada, Barra da Tijuca.

Transoeste is a bus rapid transit (BRT) line stretching from Barra da Tijuca to Santa Cruz, with a branch to Campo Grande. TransOeste was the first line to open in the Rio de Janeiro BRT system. The corridor was a transformation of the Avenida das Américas to expand the carriageways for exclusive use of high capacity buses, the BRT (Bus Rapid Transit), with transfer stations in the median, and also included the construction of the Grota Funda Tunnel. The Transoeste corridor was inaugurated on June 6, 2012.

In 2016, the corridor began connecting the Alvorada Terminal to the Jardim Oceânico station on Line 4 of the Rio Metro upon that metro station's opening.

== See also ==
- Bus Rapid Transit in Brazil
- Implementation of bus rapid transit by country
- List of bus rapid transit systems
- Transcarioca
