= Gentileza Intermodal Terminal =

Coordinates: 22.8991°S 43.2115°W

The Gentileza Intermodal Terminal (Portuguese: Terminal Intermodal Gentileza, (TIG)) is a transport terminal in Rio de Janeiro, Brazil, connecting the BRT — TransBrasil — 22 municipal bus lines, and lines 1 and 4 of the VLT Carioca. It is located on the site of the old São Cristóvão gasometer, on Avenida Francisco Bicalho, in São Cristóvão.

The name is a tribute to José Datrino, better known as prophet Gentileza — a religious preacher who became known for the phrase "Gentileza gera gentileza" ("Kindness begets kindness"), the most famous among several other phrases he wrote on the pillars of the Elevado da Perimetral and on the Gasômetro viaduct itself.

The terminal's inauguration took place on 23 February 2024, and its operations began the following day, with five bus lines, two BRT lines and one VLT line.

== History ==
=== Announcement ===
On April 7, 2021, the City of Rio de Janeiro confirmed the expansion of the VLT Carioca past the Rodoviária stop, with the construction of a new station that would integrate with the BRT TransBrasil terminal, in the site formerly occupied by the Gasômetro de São Cristóvão.

=== Start of works ===
Only a year later — on 7 April 2022 — the Rio City Hall announced that the old Gasômetro would begin to receive workers for the construction of the new Gentileza Intermodal Terminal, in honor of the Prophet Gentileza — a religious preacher who became known for the phrase "Gentileza gera gentileza" ("Kindness generates kindness"), the most famous among several other phrases that he wrote on the pillars of the Perimetral elevated road and on the Gasômetro viaduct itself. Only after a couple of months, the works actually began, on 21 July 2022.

The City Hall's forecast was that the Terminal's works would be completed by the end of 2023 and, according to initial expectations, around 130,000 people should use the TIG per day.

The delivery was in stages: The BRT was the first mode to go into operation. Next, municipal buses began to make the final stops at the Terminal and, lastly, the extension of the VLT.

The initial cost of the works was 250 million reais, and the International Broadcast Center (IBC) of the Rio 2016 Olympics, located in the Olympic Park, would be reused as the metallic structure of the Terminal. According to the initial schedule, by September 2022, all the columns of the IBC should be dismantled.

This will be the real integration terminal for TransBrasil. We will have full integration with the VLT. Passengers arrive by BRT and, if they are going to the city center, they can take the VLT. If they are going to the South Zone or Tijuca, they can take a bus. TransBrasil will meet with TransOlímpica in Deodoro, with TransCarioca near Ramos and with the VLT at the Gentileza Terminal.

— Mayor Eduardo Paes, in a speech during the ceremony that marked the beginning of the works.

=== Temporary modifications to the VLT during the construction period ===
On 2 April 2023, the VLT Carioca's operation underwent a change due to the Terminal Intermodal Gentileza's construction. With the construction of the maneuvering area for train access to the new terminal and the implementation of the new electrical substation and its connection to the VLT system, it was necessary to suspend operations on the section between the Rodoviária and Pereira Reis stops, in principle, for six months. During this period, buses—at no extra cost to passengers—operated between the Gamboa stop and the Rodoviária stop. Thus, line 1 operated between the Gamboa and Santos Dumont stops and line 2 between Vila Olímpica and Praça XV. Both lines were reestablished to their full route on 23 September of that year.

=== Trial period ===
On December 23, 2023, the first test trip of the LRT to the new terminal was carried out.

Today we celebrate the first arrival of the VLT (Light Rail Transit System) at this new terminal. We expect to have the Transbrasil BRT (Transbrasil Bus Rapid Transit System) operating in January, arriving at the Gentileza Terminal, which will be a major change for the city's mobility. Here, there will always be this transfer service, at no additional cost, allowing people to reach downtown. For the first time, we will have the entire BRT system operational and integrated. People will be able to leave Santa Cruz and arrive at Santos Dumont Airport using both the BRT and Light Rail Transit System. And we will have a direct BRT system to Tom Jobim International Airport.

— Mayor Eduardo Paes, in a speech, informing that the Rio de Janeiro City Hall will authorize taxis to use the BRT lane up to Galeão

=== Inauguration ===
The terminal was inaugurated on February 23, 2024, with the presence of President Luiz Inácio Lula da Silva, First Lady Rosângela Lula da Silva, Mayor Eduardo Paes, and other authorities.

We are at the entrance to downtown Rio, which is not just the city center, but the metropolis as a whole. Here, various modes of transport will converge to change people's lives. Imagine someone who works 8 hours a day and spends 4 or 5 hours on public transport. Now, they will have a more dignified life because of this terminal and Transbrasil.

— Mayor Eduardo Paes, during a speech at the inauguration of the TIG

Operations only began the following day, Saturday, February 24.

With the opening of TIG, Line 1 of the VLT Carioca will be renamed "Terminal Intermodal Gentileza → Aeroporto Santos Dumont" or, in short, "TIG → Santos Dumont".

On April 1, 2024, Line 4 of the VLT Carioca was inaugurated, connecting TIG with Praça XV. To do this, it shares tracks with line 1 (TIG → Santos Dumont) up to the Rodoviária stop and line 2 (Praia Formosa → Praça XV) up to Praça XV. The same happens in the opposite direction (Praça XV → TIG).
