= Manguinhos =

Manguinhos may refer to the following places in Brazil:

- Manguinhos, Rio de Janeiro, a neighborhood in Rio de Janeiro
  - Manguinhos Airport, a former airport in that neighborhood
- Manguinhos Library Park, a library in Rio de Janeiro
- Manguinhos, Serra, a neighborhood in Serra, Espírito Santo
