= Barra Olímpica =

Neighborhood in Rio de Janeiro, Brazil

Barra Olímpica is a neighborhood in the city of Rio de Janeiro, Brazil. It was officially created on 2 May 2024, following a decree by the then-mayor Eduardo Paes.

== History ==
On 2 May 2024, the City Hall of Rio de Janeiro published a decree to formalize the late-2022 law passed by the Municipal Chamber. The bill dated back to 2010 and was proposed, among others, by the president of the City Council as of May 2024, Carlo Caiado. The neighborhood was formed by the subdivision of areas from the neighborhoods of Barra da Tijuca, Camorim, and Jacarepaguá, in the vicinity of Riocentro and the Barra Olympic Park, and it will be integrated into the 24th Administrative Region – Barra da Tijuca. It comprises Riocentro, Pan-American Village, Ilha Pura Condominium, Metropolitan Center, and Asa Branca Community. Important roads within the neighborhood include Salvador Allende Avenue, Abraão Jabour Street, Abadiana Street, Arroio Pavuna Road, and sections of Ayrton Senna Avenue, as well as the canal that connects Lagoa da Tijuca to Lagoa de Jacarepaguá.
