= Olaria, Rio de Janeiro =

Olaria
- Neighborhood
- Location in Rio de Janeiro Olaria (Brazil)
- Coordinates: 22°50′48″S 43°16′23″W
- Country: Brazil
- State: Rio de Janeiro (RJ)
- Municipality/City: Rio de Janeiro
- Zone: North Zone

Population (2022)
  - Total: 51,222

Olaria is a neighborhood in the North Zone of Rio de Janeiro, Brazil.
