= Jardim Sulacap =

- Neighborhood
- Location in Rio de Janeiro Jardim Sulacap (Brazil)
- Coordinates: 22°53′30″S 43°23′44″W
- Country: Brazil
- State: Rio de Janeiro (RJ)
- Municipality/City: Rio de Janeiro
- Zone: West Zone

Area
  - Total: 786.92 ha (1,944.5 acres)

Population (2010)
  - Total: 13,062
  - Density: 1,659.9/km^{2} (4,299.1/sq mi)

Jardim Sulacap is a neighborhood in the West Zone of Rio de Janeiro, Brazil.

Jardim Sulacap is a middle-upper and middle-class neighborhood in the West Zone of the city of Rio de Janeiro, Brazil. It limits with the districts Campo dos Afonsos, Vila Valqueire, Taquara, Magalhães Bastos and Realengo.

The Human Development Index in the year 2000 was 0.856, the 50th best in the city of Rio de Janeiro.
