= Caju, Rio de Janeiro =

Caju
- Neighborhood
- Location in Rio de Janeiro Caju (Brazil)
- Coordinates: 22°52′48″S 43°13′14″W
- Country: Brazil
- State: Rio de Janeiro (RJ)
- Municipality/City: Rio de Janeiro
- Zone: Centro

Population (2010)
  - Total: 20,477

Caju is a working-class district of the North Zone of Rio de Janeiro, Brazil. Prior to the current region Caju belonged to the historic district of São Cristóvão.
