= Vaz Lobo =

- Neighborhood
- Location in Rio de Janeiro Vaz Lobo (Brazil)
- Coordinates: 22°51′33″S 43°19′44″W
- Country: Brazil
- State: Rio de Janeiro (RJ)
- Municipality/City: Rio de Janeiro
- Zone: North Zone

Population (2010)
  - Total: 15,167

Vaz Lobo is a neighborhood in the North Zone of Rio de Janeiro, Brazil.
