= Fare integration =

Fare integration refers to the practice in public transport ticketing where the same fare is charged on a journey between the same places, regardless of the operators or the interchanges used.

It is to be distinguished from payment integration, which refers to the same method of payment (for example, a transit card) being able to be used on multiple operators or modes of transport. Payment integration is a prerequisite of fare integration, but not the other way round. For example, in the Netherlands, all fares can be paid by OV-chipkaart but a separate fare is still charged transferring between trains and buses even within a city region, while an integrated fare is charged for journeys between the same mode regardless of interchanges.

== History ==
In the past, public transport tickets were often sold separately from different operators, therefore if a journey involves multiple operators, multiple tickets have to be bought for them, usually with a cost more than that of a similar journey on a single operator. This monetary cost and complexity creates a disincentive for using public transport. For example, in the 1970s, taking public transport in the Paris region could require up to 5 separate tickets. The carte orange, introduced in 1975, integrated all the transport under a single zonal network which could be used across all modes of transport within the zones covered. On the other hand, the Travelcard in London achieves the same integration for daily or seasonal fares, but integration is still lacking on single fares.

== Benefits ==
Researches have shown that fare integration can result in increase of passenger journeys on public transport and achieving modal shift. For example, Haifa replaced its former per-boarding fare system with a five-zonal, integrated system in 2012, and it resulted in a 7.7% increase in passenger trips and 18.6% in passenger boardings.

In Switzerland, national-level fare integration is a key success factor of its public transport network.

== Implementations ==
In most European cities, municipal public transport have integrated ticketing, either on a flat fare or a zonal basis. For example, HSL operates a zonal system which covers the Helsinki metropolitan area, where all buses, trams, and commuter trains form a single network, and a ticket entitles unlimited transfers within the time and zone validity.

The level of integration varies among different regions. For example, in the North America, commuter rail is usually not part of the integrated network., while they are usually an integral part of the urban transport in Europe.

With automated fare collection, other methods of fare calculation, for example, distance-based, can be used as an alternative to flat fare or zonal-based fares.

=== Examples ===
- Czech Republic:
  - Prague: The fare system in Prague and Central Bohemia is fully integrated on a zonal basis. There are no single tickets, all tickets are timed which allows unlimited transfers without route limitation within the zones covered. In particular, Prague itself is the central zone which effectively means a flat-fare system operates there.
- Finland:
  - Helsinki: The fare system within the HSL network in the Helsinki metropolitan region is fully integrated on a zonal basis. All tickets are zonal, valid on all modes of transport, and offer unlimited transfers.
- United Kingdom: In the UK, fare integration usually comes in the form of multi-modal zonal day ticket, while fare integration for single fares remain rare.
  - London: Integrated ticketing in London is offered by means of a Travelcard, which can be used for most public transport modes in Greater London, with some premium modes and services excluded. When paying by PAYG, fare capping also applies across the same modes of transport covered by a Travelcard, however, there is no integration for single fares between buses / trams and heavy rail / metro services, where two separate fares are charged if a transfer is done between bus and tube compared to a single fare for travelling solely on the tube and rail network between the same places, unless the fare cap is reached. However, even within the rail network, the fare differs between the routes used even if the zones used are the same, with a train-tube journey costing more in a single fare compared to a train-only or tube-only journey under circumstances.
- Hong Kong: All public transport is charged on a single-leg basis, where a retendering of fare is required when changing under all circumstances, unless a period pass is used. There are no products which are valid across all operators on a uniform basis, and even within a single operator, the fare depends on the exact route and interchanges used, with separate fares always required for changing, although interchange discounts are given under limited circumstances. The only exceptions are the MTR urban lines network, and the Light Rail network, where changing within the network does not require retendering fare.
- Netherlands: The OV network, which works country-wide, offers integrated fare on an operator basis. Changing between different vehicles / modes within the same operator does not cost extra compared to a journey of the same distance on a single vehicle. However, changing between different operators will result in a new fare being charged.
- Turkey:
  - Istanbul, there is no fare integration, despite the whole of IETT being run as a single network. Changing between different lines (including between different metro lines) requires retendering of extra fare, although a discount is given within a time limit.

== See also ==
- Intermodal passenger transport
