= Gardênia Azul =

- Neighborhood
- Location in Rio de Janeiro Gardênia Azul (Brazil)
- Coordinates: 22°57′29″S 43°21′01″W
- Country: Brazil
- State: Rio de Janeiro (RJ)
- Municipality/City: Rio de Janeiro
- Zone: Southwest Zone

Gardênia Azul is a neighborhood in the Southwest Zone of Rio de Janeiro, Brazil.
