= Galeão, Rio de Janeiro =

Galeão
- Neighborhood
- Location of Galeão within Rio de Janeiro city; and Rio de Janeiro state (inset)
- Interactive map of Galeão
- Coordinates: 22°48′33″S 43°14′17″W
- Country: Brazil
- State: Rio de Janeiro (RJ)
- Municipality/City: Rio de Janeiro
- Zone: North Zone
- Administrative Region: XX - Ilha do Governador

Area
  - Total: 1,895.74 ha (4,684.5 acres)

Population (2010)
  - Total: 22,971
  - Density: 1,211.7/km^{2} (3,138.3/sq mi)

Galeão is a neighborhood in the North Zone of Rio de Janeiro, Brazil. It is located on Governador Island besides the Rio de Janeiro–Galeão International Airport.
