= Tanque =

- Neighborhood
- Location in Rio de Janeiro Tanque (Brazil)
- Coordinates: 22°54′58″S 43°21′21″W
- Country: Brazil
- State: Rio de Janeiro (RJ)
- Municipality/City: Rio de Janeiro
- Zone: Southwest Zone

Population (2022)
  - Total: 36,815

Tanque is a neighborhood in the Southwest Zone of Rio de Janeiro, Brazil.
