= Praça Seca =

- Neighborhood
- Location in Rio de Janeiro Praça Seca (Brazil)
- Coordinates: 22°53′52″S 43°21′08″W
- Country: Brazil
- State: Rio de Janeiro (RJ)
- Municipality/City: Rio de Janeiro
- Zone: Southwest Zone

Praça Seca is a neighborhood in the Southwest Zone of Rio de Janeiro, Brazil.
