= Penha Circular =

- Neighborhood
- Location in Rio de Janeiro Penha Circular (Brazil)
- Coordinates: 22°49′56″S 43°17′15″W
- Country: Brazil
- State: Rio de Janeiro (RJ)
- Municipality/City: Rio de Janeiro
- Zone: North Zone

Penha Circular is a neighborhood in the North Zone of Rio de Janeiro, Brazil. It is located 10 kilometres (6.2 miles) from Rio de Janeiro/Galeão International Airport.
