= Maré, Rio de Janeiro =

Maré
- Neighborhood
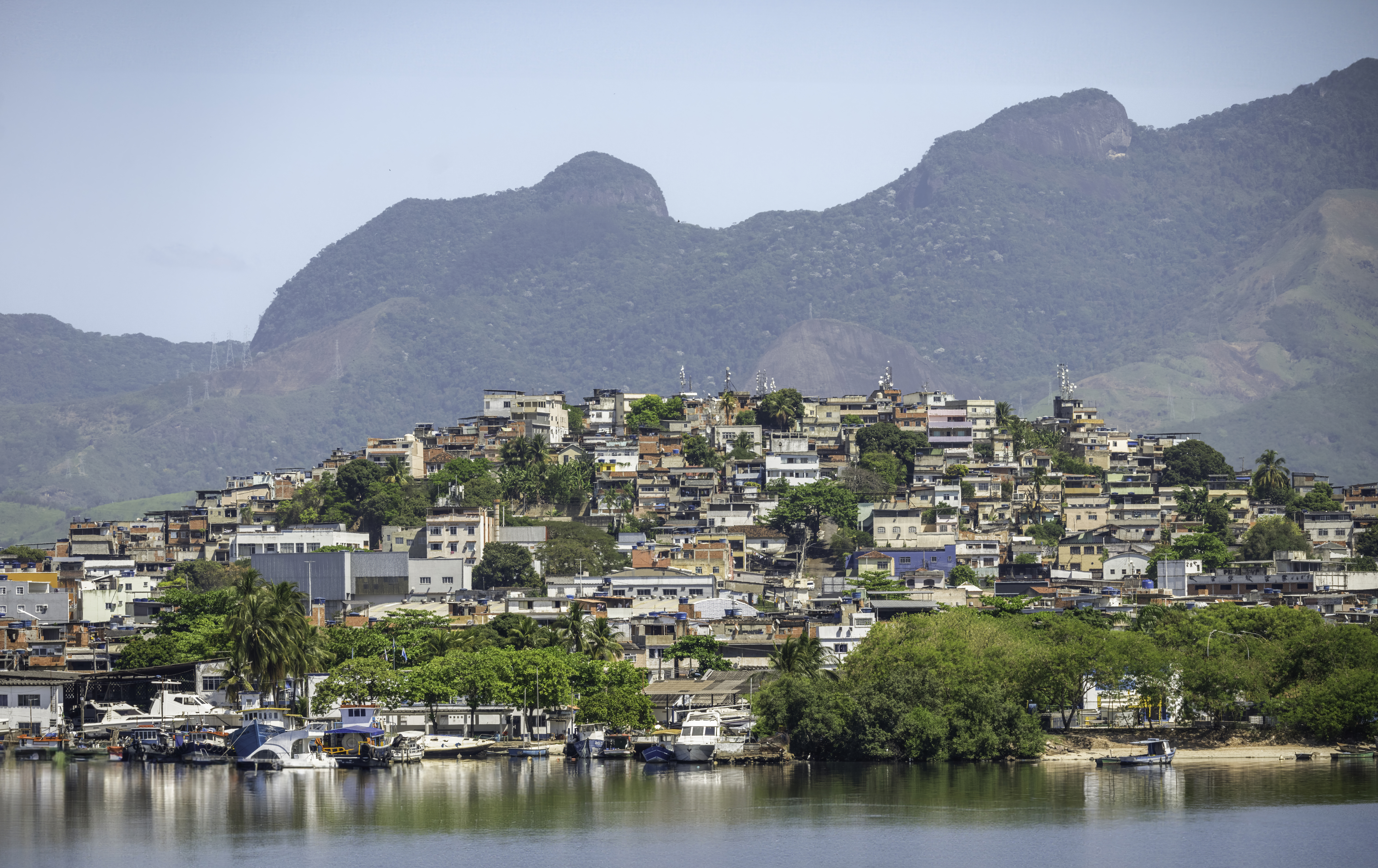
- Complexo Maré

- Location in Rio de Janeiro
- Coordinates: 22°51′48″S 43°14′24″W
- Country: Brazil
- State: Rio de Janeiro (RJ)
- Municipality/City: Rio de Janeiro
- Zone: North Zone

Population (2010)
  - Total: 129,770

Maré is a neighborhood and favela (low-income informal neighborhood) in the North Zone of Rio de Janeiro, Brazil. It is a grouping of several favelas, suburbs with houses, and housing complexes. With approximately 130,000 residents (2006 estimate), it is one of the largest slum complexes in Rio de Janeiro, a consequence of the low indicators of social development that characterize the region.

In 2014 it was featured in a BBC Documentary series Welcome to Rio which highlighted issues with gangs and its pacification.

== Pacification efforts ==
On March 30, 2014, ahead of the 2014 FIFA World Cup, Maré was occupied by various Brazilian security forces in an attempt to pacify the region. The raid began before dawn and involved over 1,000 police and other forces, including the Special Police Operations Battalion (BOPE), Shock Police Battalion, several other police units, and the Brazilian Marine Corps.
