= Campinho, Rio de Janeiro =

Campinho
- Neighborhood
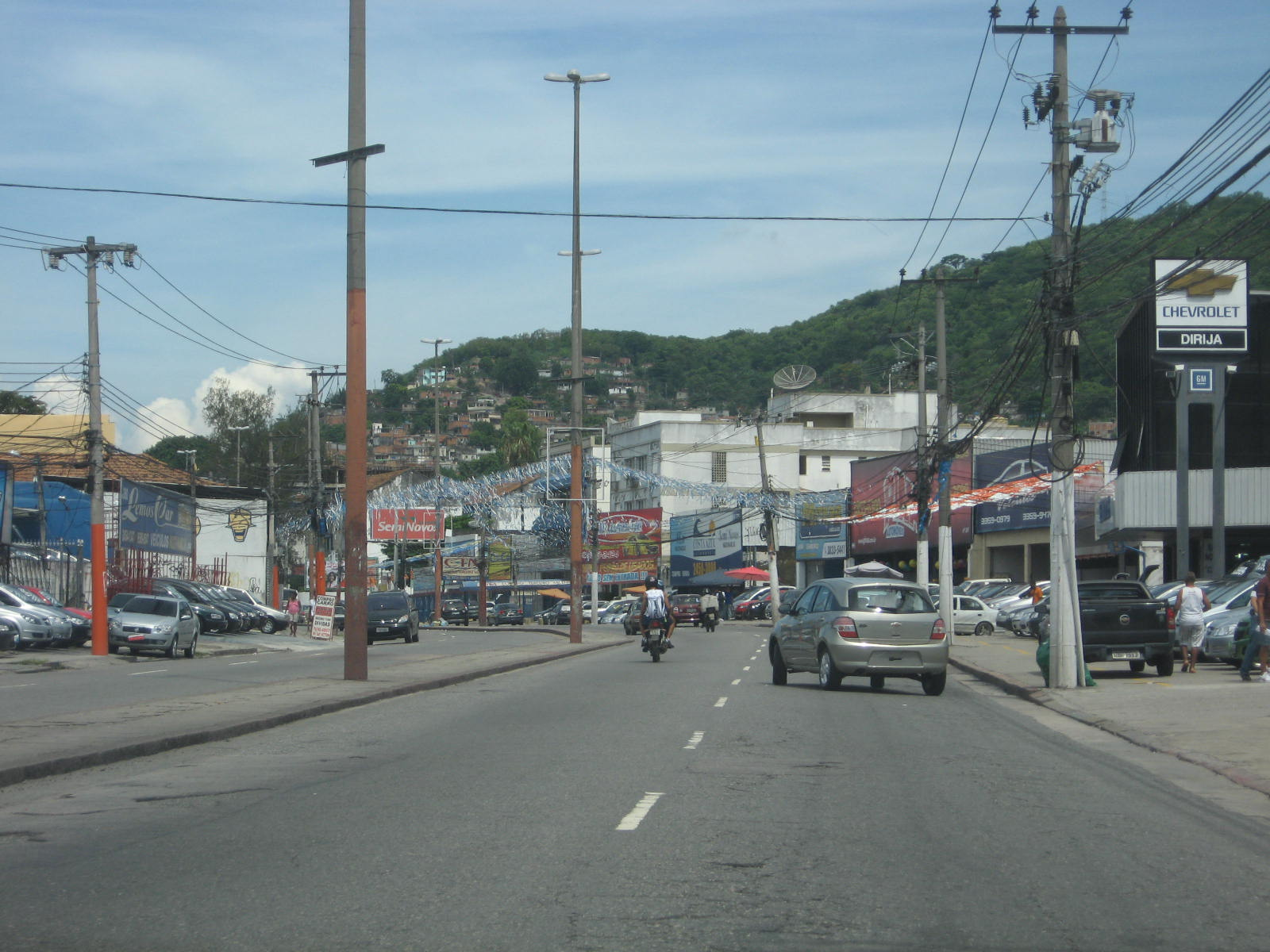

- Location in Rio de Janeiro Campinho (Brazil)
- Coordinates: 22°53′09″S 43°20′51″W
- Country: Brazil
- State: Rio de Janeiro (RJ)
- Municipality/City: Rio de Janeiro
- Zone: North Zone

Population (2010)
  - Total: 10,156

Campinho is a neighborhood in the North Zone of Rio de Janeiro, Brazil.

This neighborhood is famous for being the birthplace of renowned Brazilian actress Fernanda Montenegro.
