= Ramos, Rio de Janeiro =

Ramos
- Neighborhood
- Location in Rio de Janeiro Ramos (Brazil)
- Coordinates: 22°51′03″S 43°15′27″W
- Country: Brazil
- State: Rio de Janeiro (RJ)
- Municipality/City: Rio de Janeiro
- Zone: North Zone

Population (2010)
  - Total: 40,792

Ramos is a neighborhood of the North Zone of Rio de Janeiro, Brazil.
