= Vila da Penha =

- Neighborhood
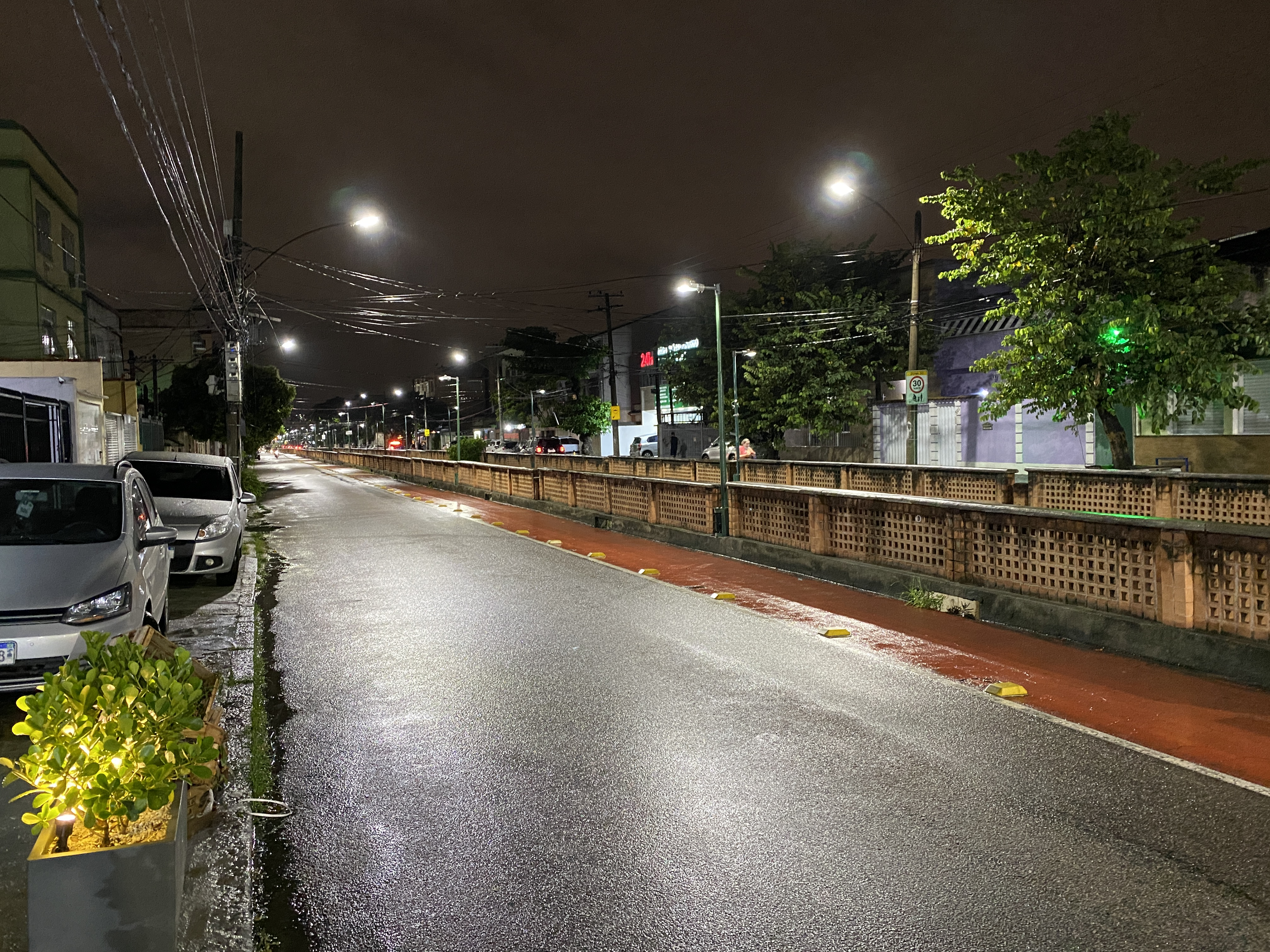

- Location in Rio de Janeiro Vila da Penha (Brazil)
- Coordinates: 22°50′35″S 43°18′36″W
- Country: Brazil
- State: Rio de Janeiro (RJ)
- Municipality/City: Rio de Janeiro
- Zone: North Zone

Population (2010)
  - Total: 25,465

Vila da Penha is a predominantly middle class neighborhood located in the region called the "Leopoldina Zone", a historic region in the Northern part of Rio de Janeiro City. The neighborhood is divided between residential and commercial zones, featuring a shopping mall, lots of restaurants, shops, commercial centers, gastronomic streets, bars, bistros, banks, among others. It is also close to the Vicente de Carvalho Metro Station.
