= Curicica =

- Neighborhood
- Location in Rio de Janeiro Curicica (Brazil)
- Coordinates: 22°57′00″S 43°23′25″W
- Country: Brazil
- State: Rio de Janeiro (RJ)
- Municipality/City: Rio de Janeiro
- Zone: Southwest Zone

Curicica is a neighborhood in the Southwest Zone of Rio de Janeiro, Brazil.
