= Bus transport in Rio de Janeiro =

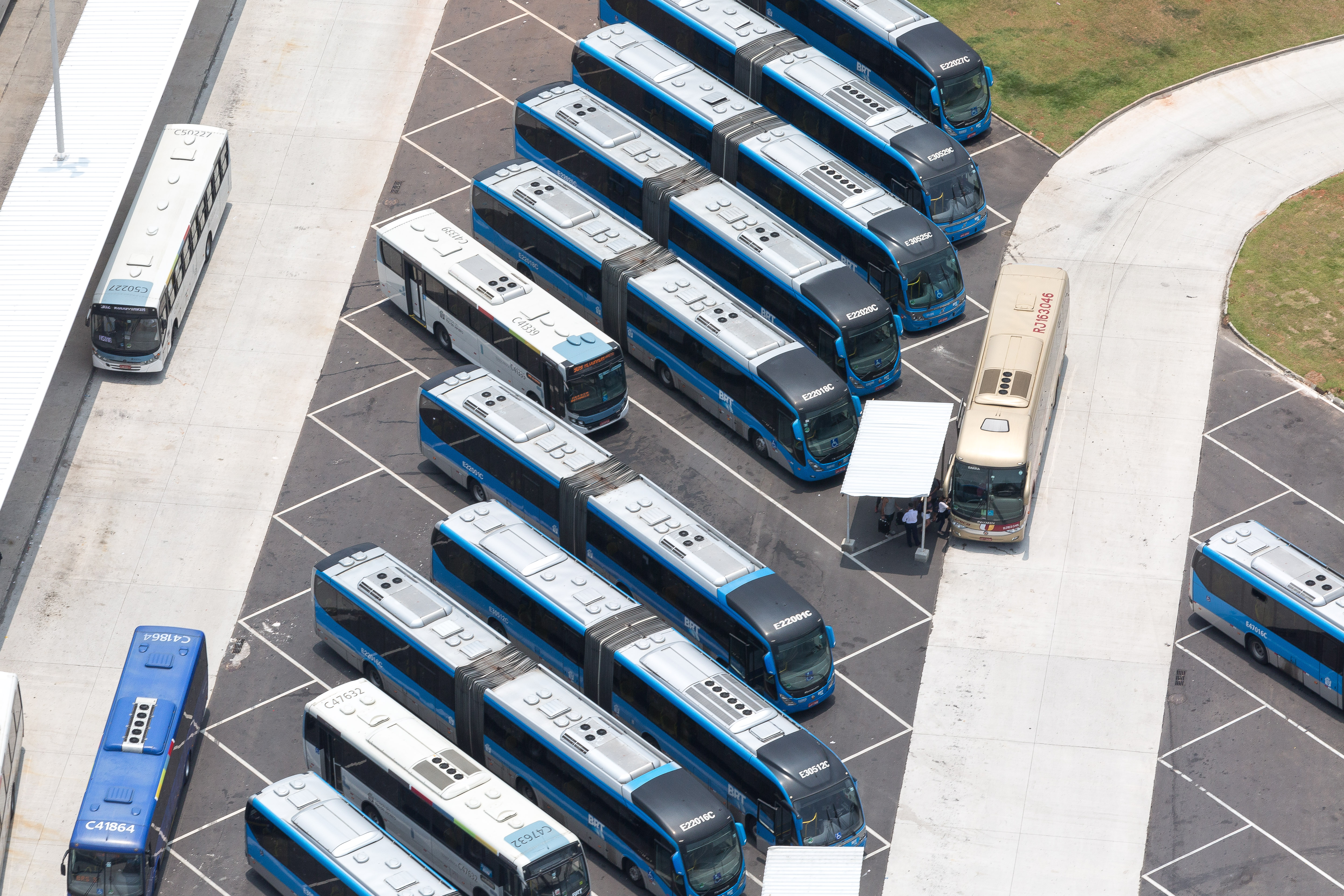
BRT's parking area

The Rio de Janeiro bus system forms an important part of the public transport system in the city of Rio de Janeiro in Brazil.

As of the end of 2015, there were 1,752 bus routes servicing the Rio de Janeiro Metropolitan Region, including 705 licensed by the municipality of Rio de Janeiro.

== Municipal buses ==
The City of Rio de Janeiro bus fleet is made up of over 8,000 vehicles, operated by 47 different companies.

== BRT ==
Mobi Rio BRT

BRT is a bus rapid transit system that, as of 2024, the consists of four operating lines, Transcarioca, Transoeste, Transolímpica, and TransBrasil.

== Bus terminals ==
Terminal	Location	Services	Ref.
Alvorada	Barra da Tijuca	Municipal, Transoeste, Transcarioca, Intermunicipal, Interstate	
Américo Ayres	Meier	Municipal, Intermunicipal	
Arquiteto Paciello	Meier	Municipal	
Campo Grande	Campo Grande	Municipal, Transoeste, Interstate	
Cosme Velho	Cosme Velho	Municipal	
Curicica	Jacarepaguá	Municipal	
Daniel Barata	Penha	Municipal	
Deodoro	Deodoro	Municipal, Interstate, Transolímpica	
Enock Anselmo dos Santos	Irajá	Municipal	
Fundão (Aroldo Melodia)	Ilha do Fundão	Municipal	
Gardênia Azul	Jacarepaguá	Municipal	
Gentileza	São Cristóvão	Municipal, Transbrasil, Light rail	
Jamil Amiden - Av Chile	Centro	Municipal	
Jardim Oceânico	Barra da Tijuca	Municipal, Transoeste	
Madureira	Madureira	Municipal, Transcarioca	
Nossa Senhora do Amparo	Cascadura	Municipal	
Novo Rio	Santo Cristo	Intermunicipal, Interstate, International	
Padre Henrique Otte	Santo Cristo	Municipal	
Procópio Ferreira	Centro	Municipal	
PUC Gávea	Gávea	Municipal, intermunicipal	
Recreio	Recreio dos Bandeirantes	Transolímpica	
Ribeira	Ilha do Governador	Municipal	
Santa Cruz	Santa Cruz	Transoeste	
Serrinha	Campo Grande	Municipal	
Souza Marques	Cascadura	Municipal, Intermunicipal	
Sulacap	Sulacap	Transolímpica	
Terreirão	Recreio	Municipal	
Usina	Tijuca	Municipal	
