= Vicente de Carvalho, Rio de Janeiro =

Vicente de Carvalho
- Neighborhood
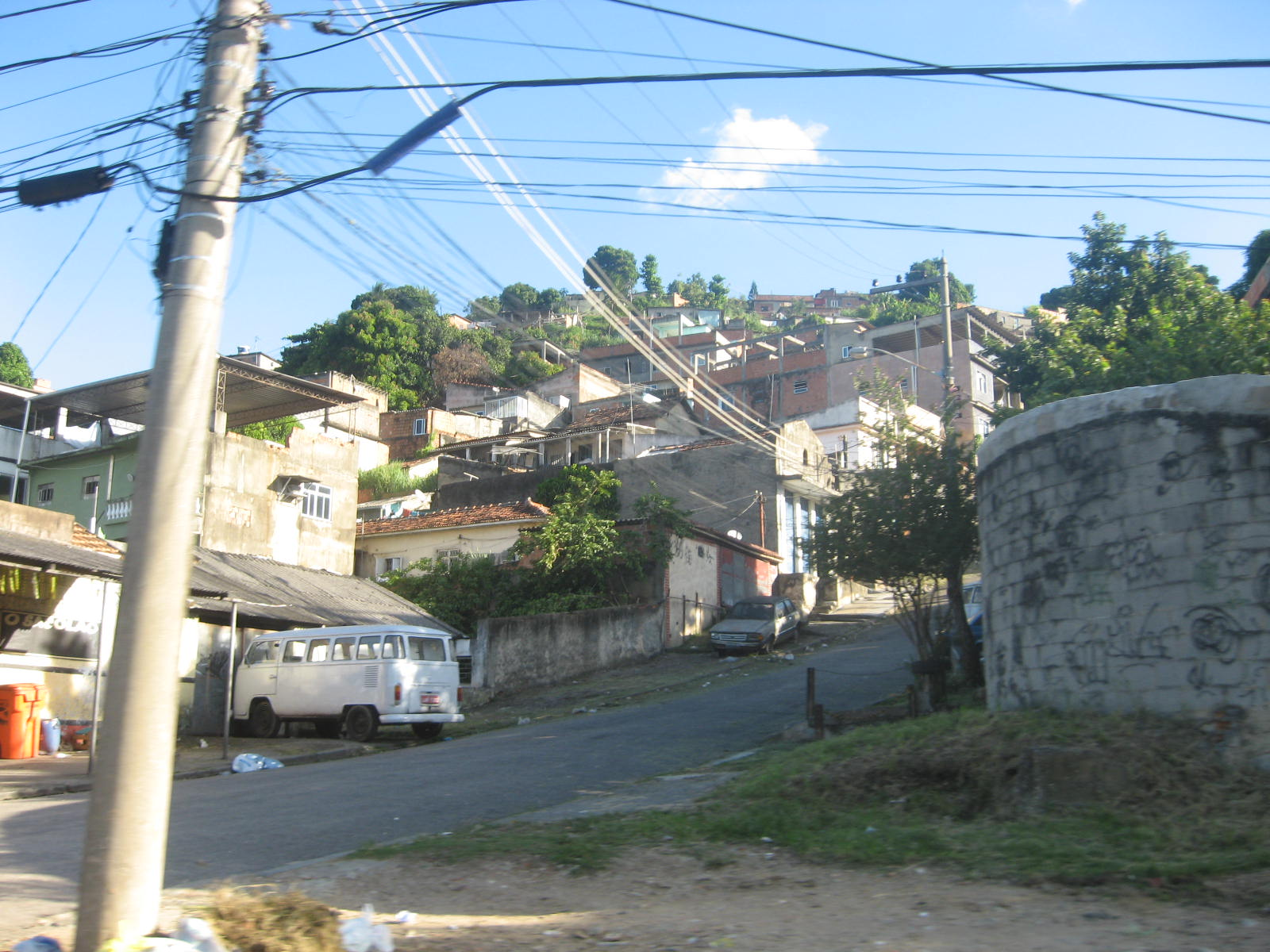

- Location in Rio de Janeiro Vicente de Carvalho (Brazil)
- Coordinates: 22°51′25″S 43°19′02″W
- Country: Brazil
- State: Rio de Janeiro (RJ)
- Municipality/City: Rio de Janeiro
- Zone: North Zone

Population (2010)
  - Total: 24,964

Vicente de Carvalho is a middle-class neighborhood in the North Zone of Rio de Janeiro, Brazil.
