= Taquara, Rio de Janeiro =

Taquara
- Neighborhood
- Location in Rio de Janeiro Taquara (Brazil)
- Coordinates: 22°55′20″S 43°23′17″W
- Country: Brazil
- State: Rio de Janeiro (RJ)
- Municipality/City: Rio de Janeiro
- Zone: Southwest Zone

Taquara is a neighborhood in the Southwest Zone of Rio de Janeiro, Brazil.

The bairro contains the Pau da Fome center of the 12,500 hectares (31,000 acres) Pedra Branca State Park, created in 1974.
