= List of Rio de Janeiro metro stations =

Metrô Rio

This is a list of stations on the underground railway system (Metrô Rio) in Rio de Janeiro, Brazil. Nowadays, the system has three lines denominated numerically: broadly Line 1 serves the south and central zones while Line 2 serves the north. There used to be an interchange between them at Estácio Station, but now Line 2 uses the rails of Line 1 to get at Botafogo Station, closing interchange at Estácio. Line 4 (yellow line) links West Zone, in the neighbourhood of Barra da Tijuca, to South Zone, in Ipanema.

Line 3, serving Niterói and São Gonçalo municipalities, is being planned.

Currently, there are 41 operational stations.

== Current lines ==
=== Linha 1 (Line 1 - Orange) ===
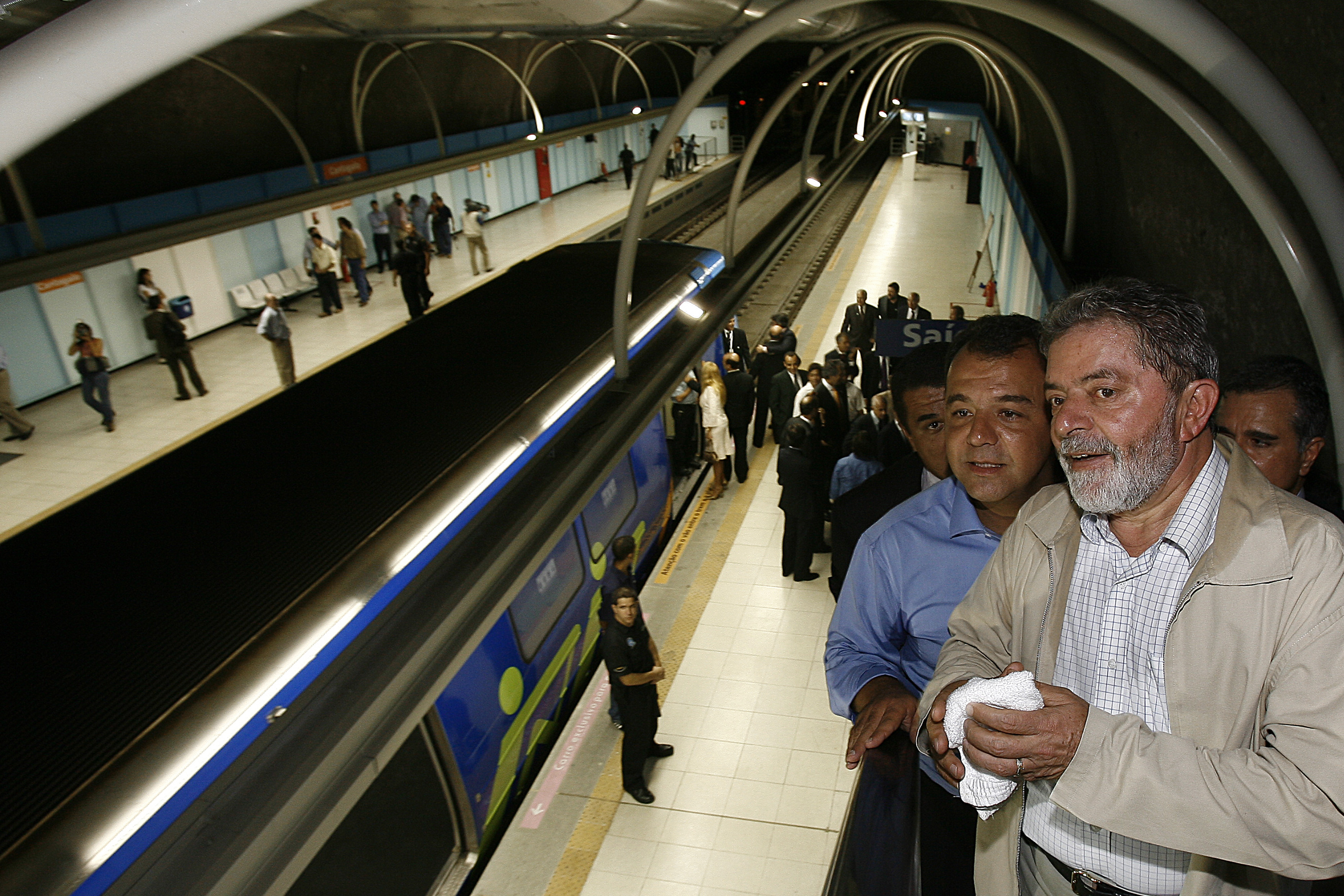
Then-President of Brazil Luiz Inácio Lula da Silva and then-governor of Rio de Janeiro, Sérgio Cabral Filho, at the now-open Cantagalo Station (2007).

- General Osório
- Cantagalo
- Siqueira Campos
- Cardeal Arcoverde
- Botafogo^{†}
- Flamengo^{†}
- Largo do Machado^{†}
- Catete^{†}
- Glória^{†}
- Cinelândia^{†}
- Carioca^{†}
- Uruguaiana^{†}
- Presidente Vargas^{†}
- Central^{†}
- Praça Onze
- Estácio^{‡}
- Afonso Pena
- São Francisco Xavier
- Saens Peña
- Uruguai

^{†} Station is shared with Line 2 on work days
^{‡} Station is shared with Line 2 on holidays and weekends

=== Linha 2 (Line 2 - Green) ===
- Cidade Nova
- São Cristóvão
- Maracanã
- Triagem
- Maria da Graça
- Nova América/Del Castilho
- Inhaúma
- Engenho da Rainha
- Thomaz Coelho
- Vicente de Carvalho
- Irajá
- Colégio
- Coelho Neto
- Acari/Fazenda Botafogo
- Engenheiro Rubens Paiva
- Pavuna

=== Linha 4 (Line 4 - Yellow) ===
- Nossa Senhora da Paz
- Jardim de Alah
- Antero de Quental
- São Conrado
- Jardim Oceânico

== Under construction/planned ==
=== Linha 3 (Line 3 - Blue) ===
It is a line planned to go from Niterói to Guaxindiba, in São Gonçalo. Plans also include an extension from Niterói to Carioca Station, in Rio.

=== Inactive stations ===
- Morro de São João/Rio Sul, on Line 1 (between Cardeal Arcoverde and Botafogo stations)
- Gávea, on Line 2 (between Antero de Quental and São Conrado stations)

=== Planned stations ===
- Belford Roxo, on Line 2
- São João de Meriti, on Line 2
- Duque de Caxias, on Line 2
- Barra da Tijuca, on Line 4
- Alvorada, on Line 4
- Galeão (possible transference to the airport), on Line 5

== Bibliography ==
- "Mapa Esquematico" (PDF). MetrôRio.
