= São Francisco Xavier Station (Metrô Rio) =

Metro station in Rio de Janeiro, Brazil

São Francisco Xavier / Tijuca
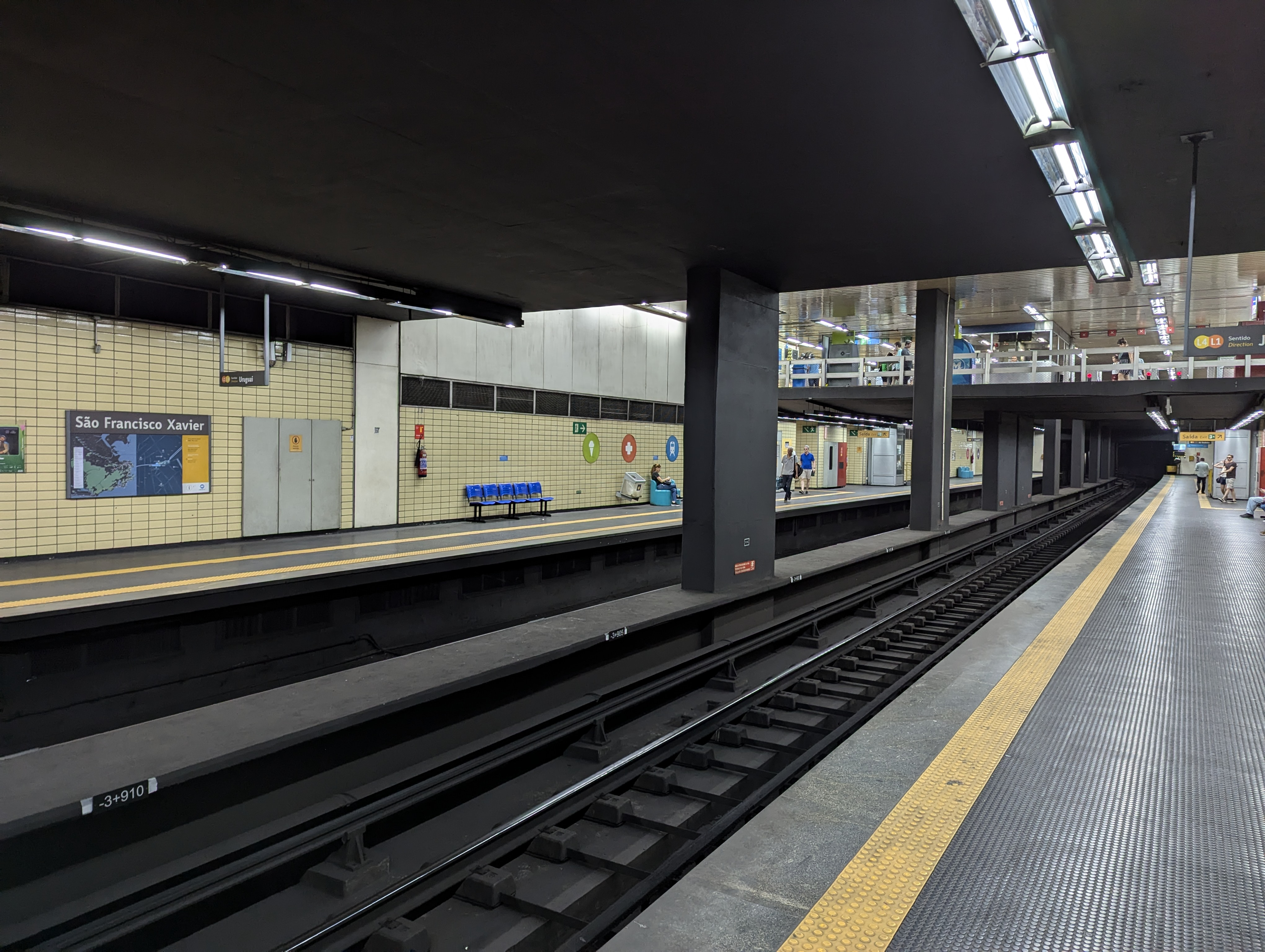
- The station's interior in September 2024

General information
- Location: Tijuca, Rio de Janeiro; Brazil
- Coordinates: 22.9208733°S 43.2237121°W
- Operator: Metrô Rio
- Line: Line 1

Other information
- Station code: SFX

History
- Opened: 1982; 44 years ago

Services
Preceding station	Rio de Janeiro Metro	Following station
Saens Peña towards Uruguai	Line 1	Afonso Pena towards General Osório
Location
- Location within Rio de Janeiro

São Francisco Xavier / Tijuca Station (Portuguese: Estação São Francisco Xavier / Tijuca) is a subway station on the Rio de Janeiro Metro that services the neighbourhood of Tijuca in the North Zone of Rio de Janeiro. It is located next to a church of the same name and the Teatro Ziembinski.
