= Carioca Station =

Metro station in Rio de Janeiro, Brazil

Carioca
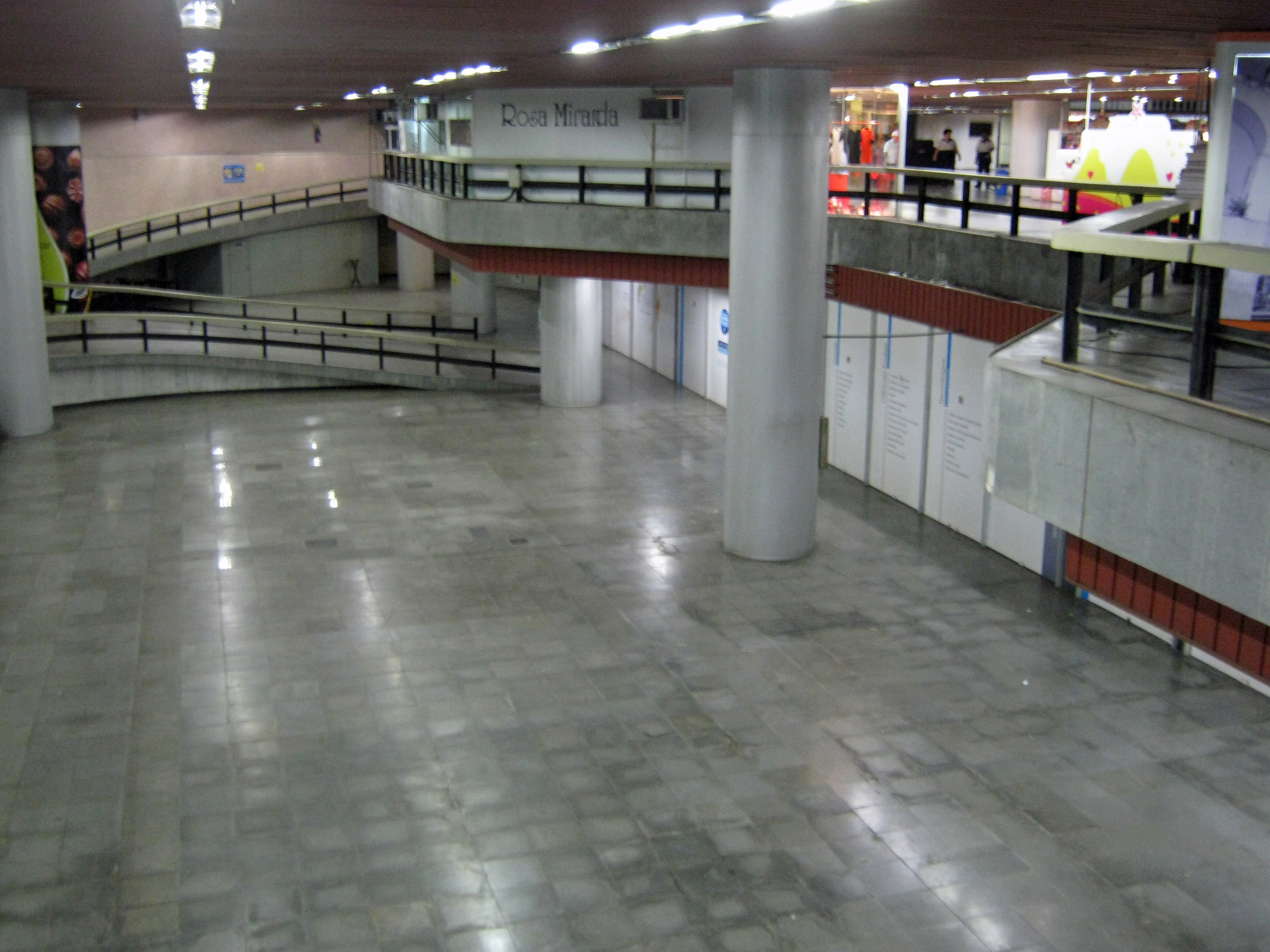
- Top-down view of Carioca station

General information
- Location: Centro, Rio de Janeiro; Brazil
- Coordinates: 22.9079688°S 43.1799792°W
- Operator: Metrô Rio
- Lines: Line 1 Line 2

Other information
- Station code: CRC

History
- Opened: 1981; 45 years ago

Services
Preceding station	Rio de Janeiro Metro	Following station
Uruguaiana towards Uruguai	Line 1	Cinelândia towards General Osório
Uruguaiana towards Pavuna	Line 2	Cinelândia towards Botafogo
Location
- Location within Rio de Janeiro

Carioca Station (Portuguese: Estação Carioca) is a subway station on the Rio de Janeiro Metro that services downtown Rio de Janeiro.
