= Cardeal Arcoverde Station =

Metro station in Rio de Janeiro, Brazil

Cardeal Arcoverde / Copacabana
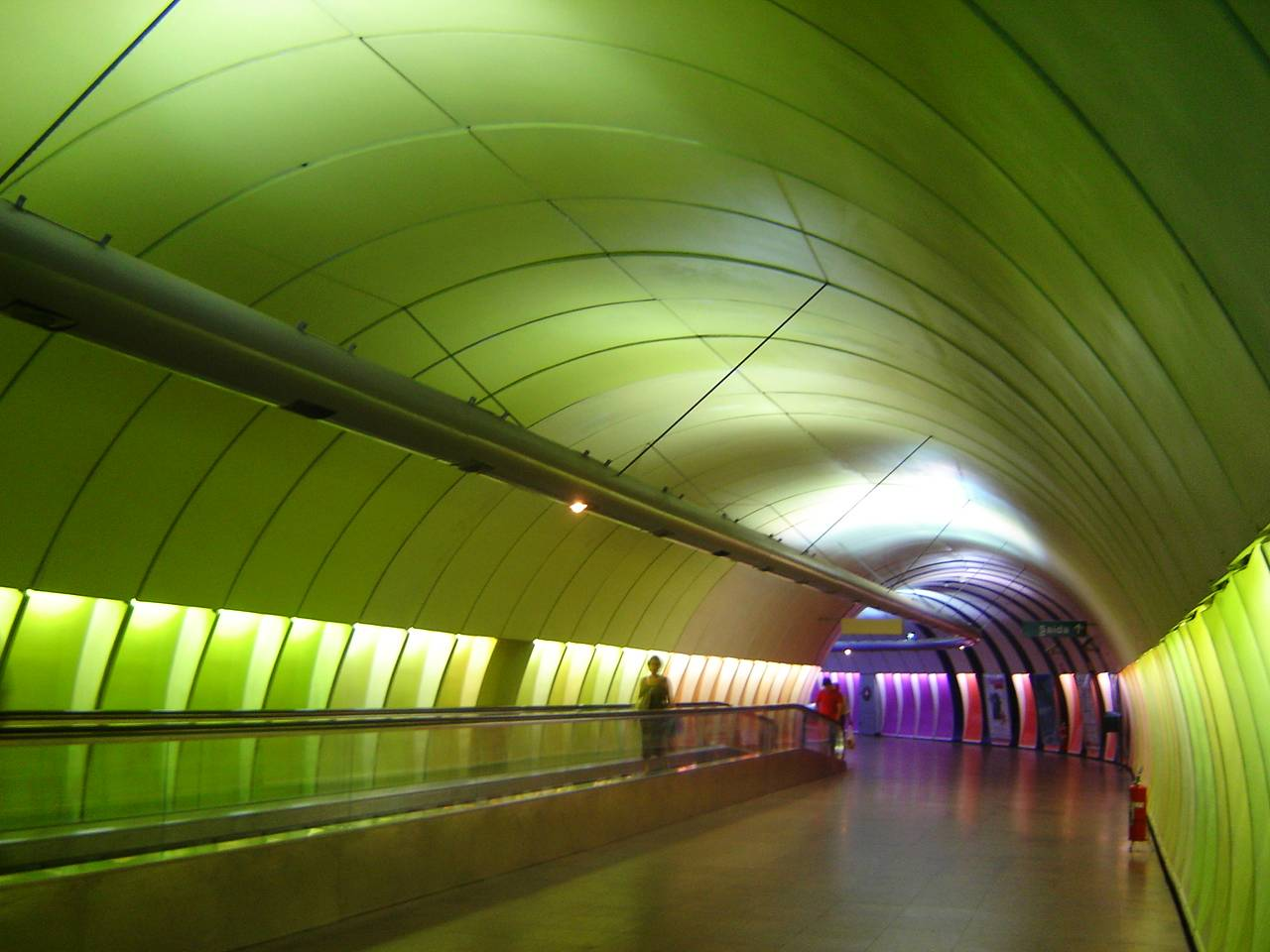
- Cardeal Arcoverde / Copacabana station

General information
- Location: Praça Cardeal Arcoverde; Copacabana, Rio de Janeiro; Brazil
- Coordinates: 22.964636°S 43.180664°W
- Operator: Metrô Rio
- Line: Line 1

Other information
- Station code: CAV

History
- Opened: 1998; 28 years ago

Services
Preceding station	Rio de Janeiro Metro	Following station
Botafogo towards Uruguai	Line 1	Siqueira Campos towards General Osório
Location
- Location within Rio de Janeiro

Cardeal Arcoverde / Copacabana Station (Portuguese: Estação Cardeal Arcoverde / Copacabana) is a subway station on Line 1 of the Rio de Janeiro Metro servicing the Copacabana area. It was inaugurated on July 2, 1998, and approximately 60,000 people pass through it daily. It is located in Cardeal Arcoverde Square, in Copacabana, between Tonelero and Barata Ribeiro streets.

On some weekends, holidays, and during events such as the Rio Carnival, the station receives trains from Line 2.

== History ==
Construction on the station began in February 1988, as part of the Moreira Franco administration's project to extend Metro Line 1 to Copacabana. During the design phase, a small group of residents were radically opposed to the station's construction and unsuccessfully attempted to cancel it. However, due to a lack of resources, construction was halted in January 1990. There was an attempt to resume work in 1994, when the Rio metro was almost municipalized, but the project never materialized. Only on May 4, 1995, during Marcelo Alencar's administration, were works resumed. The expected opening date was October 1997.

Delays, however, meant that the station was only delivered on July 2, 1998, at a cost of 190 million reais.

In August 2022, the station was renamed from "Cardeal Arcoverde" to "Cardeal Arcoverde / Copacabana," at which time stations gained suffixes with the names of the neighborhoods in which they are located.

The station's name refers to the square where it is located. Originally called Sacopenapã Square, it was opened on July 26, 1894. Following the death of Cardinal Arcoverde in 1930, it was renamed in his honor. He was the first Roman Catholic cardinal in Latin America.

== Characteristics ==
The station has a maximum depth of 53 m (relative to the surface of C.Arcoverde Square). Its construction required the excavation of 327,000 m³ of mostly rocky material, transported by 30,000 trucks. The rocky soil was partially excavated using 308 tons of explosives.

The station's structure used 5,000 tons of steel and 62,500 m³ of concrete. The distance between the station entrance, the mezzanine area (ticket offices, turnstiles and stairs) and the platforms is 180 m, covered by 3 moving walkways of 86 m each. The station has 8 escalators and 4 inclined platforms (which transport people with disabilities over the fixed stairs) on its four levels. 135 types of granite were used for the floor coverings, while the walls received 68 different colors.

It has two entrances:

Access A - Cardeal Arcoverde Square

Access B - Tonelero Street
