= Presidente Vargas Station =

Metro station in Rio de Janeiro, Brazil

Presidente Vargas Estação Presidente Vargas
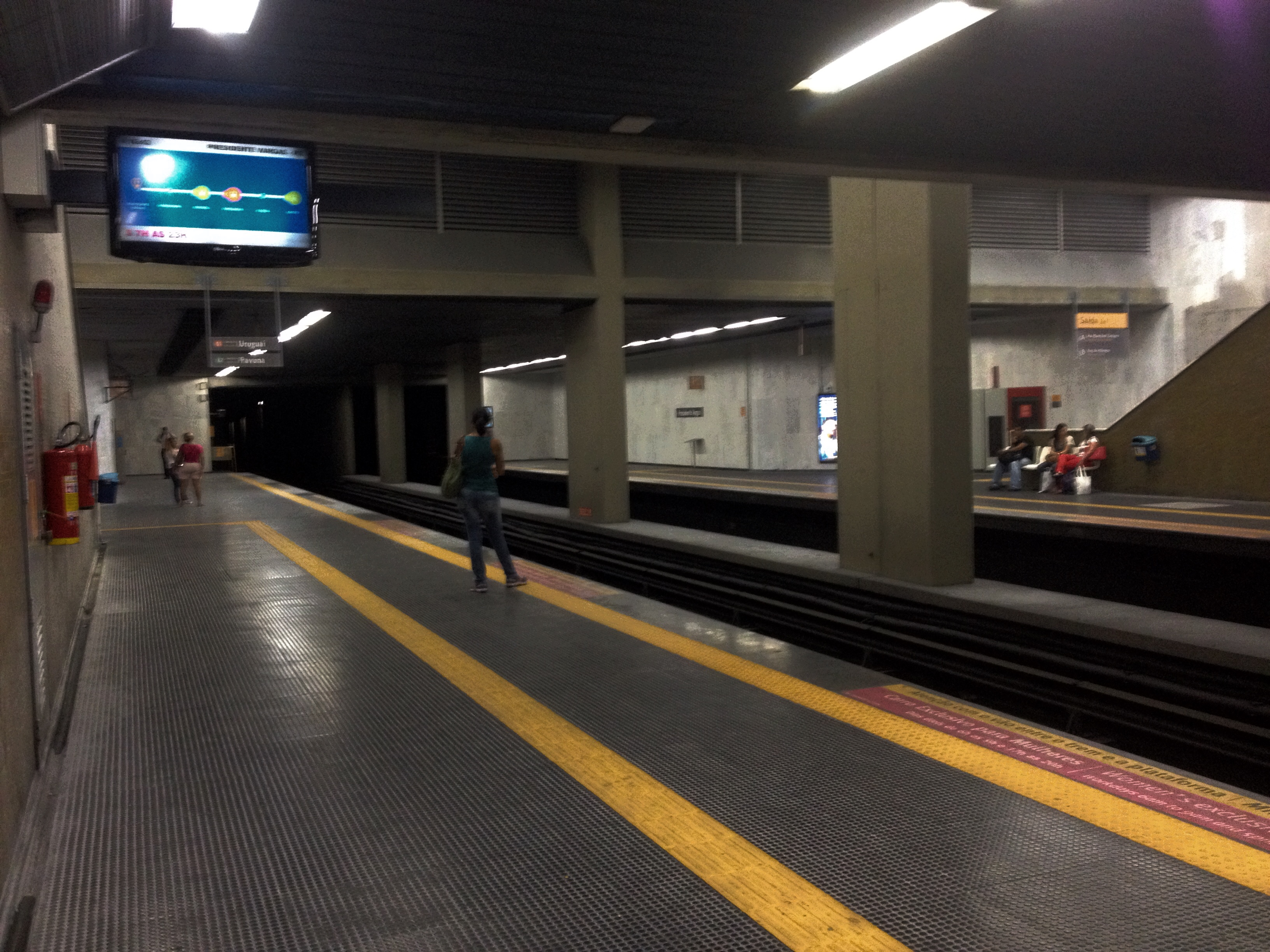

General information
- Location: Avenida Presidente Vargas; Rio de Janeiro; Brazil
- Coordinates: 22.9102662°S 43.1979273°W
- Operator: Metrô Rio
- Lines: Line 1 Line 2

Other information
- Station code: PVG

History
- Opened: 1979; 47 years ago

Services
Preceding station	Rio de Janeiro Metro	Following station
Central do Brasil towards Uruguai	Line 1	Uruguaiana towards General Osório
Central do Brasil towards Pavuna	Line 2	Uruguaiana towards Botafogo
Location
- Location within Rio de Janeiro

Presidente Vargas Station (Portuguese: Estação Presidente Vargas) is a subway station on the Rio de Janeiro Metro that services the Rio de Janeiro downtown.
