= Uruguaiana Station =

Subway station in Rio de Janeiro

Uruguaiana-Eng. Fernando Mac Dowell
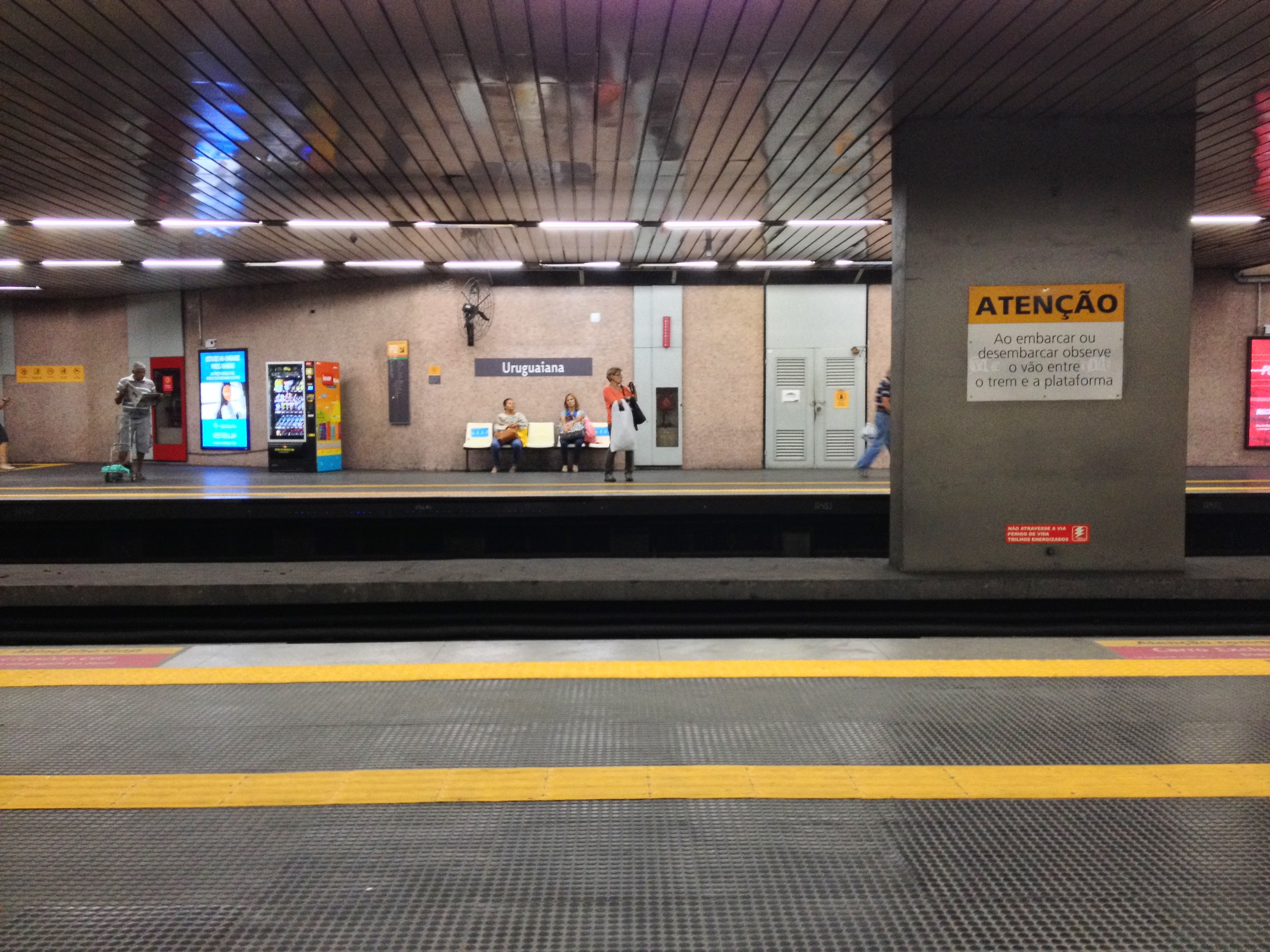

General information
- Location: Rua da Alfândega; Centro, Rio de Janeiro; Brazil
- Coordinates: 22.90294°S 43.18173°W
- Operator: Metrô Rio
- Lines: Line 1; Line 2

Other information
- Station code: URG

History
- Opened: 1980; 46 years ago
- Former names: Uruguaiana

Services
Preceding station	Rio de Janeiro Metro	Following station
Presidente Vargas towards Uruguai	Line 1	Carioca towards General Osório
Presidente Vargas towards Pavuna	Line 2	Carioca towards Botafogo
Location
- Location within Rio de Janeiro

Uruguaiana–Eng. Fernando Mac Dowell (Portuguese: Estação Uruguaiana-Eng. Fernando Mac Dowell) is a subway station on the Rio de Janeiro Metro which serves downtown Rio de Janeiro. It is on line 1 and line 2. The station was renamed in 2019 in honour of Fernando Mac Dowell (1945–2018), deputy mayor of the city of Rio de Janeiro between 2017 and his death.
