= Jardim de Alah Station =

Metro station in Rio de Janeiro, Brazil

Jardim de Alah / Leblon
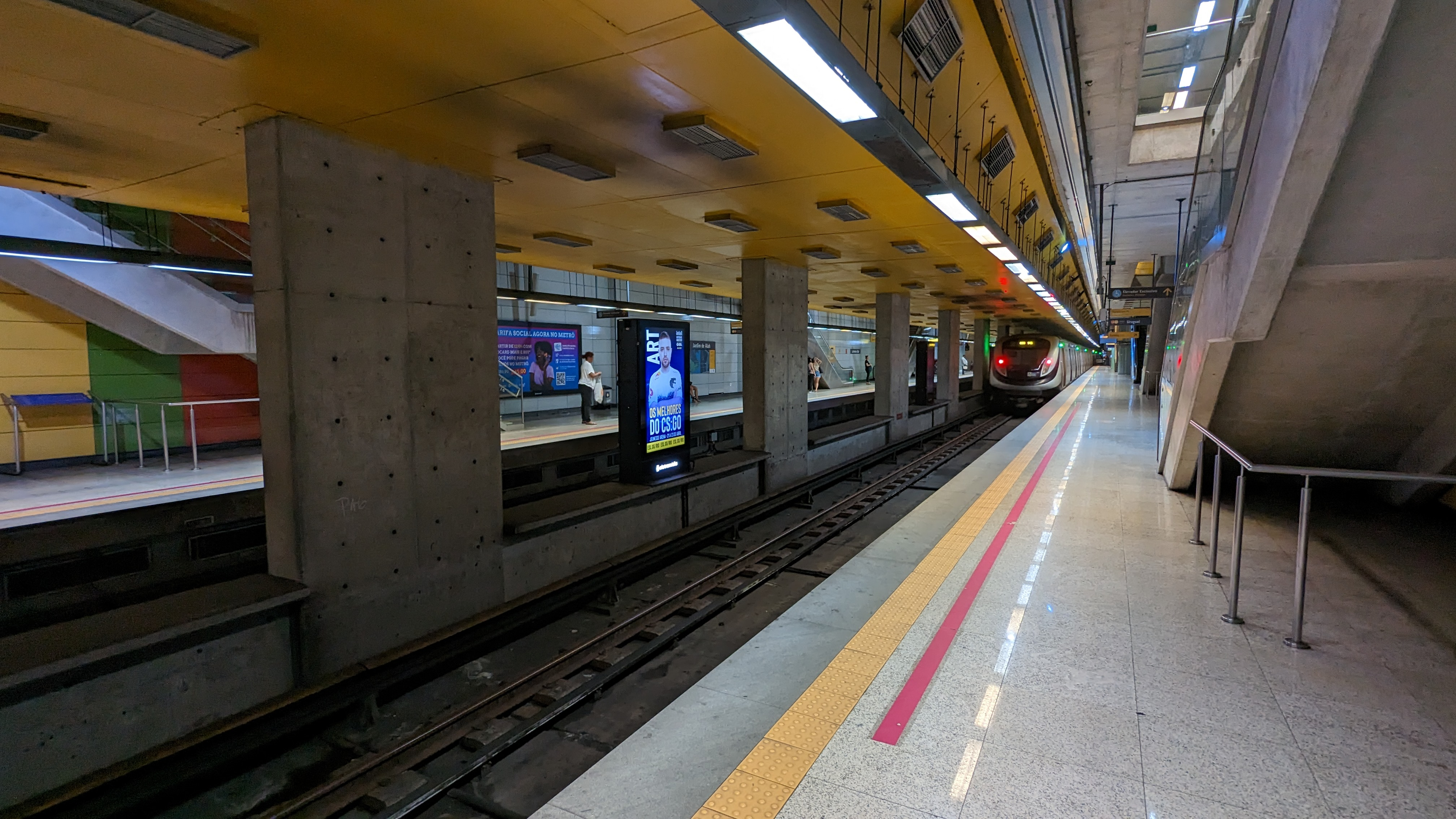
- Train leaving the station towards General Osório Station.

General information
- Location: Jardim de Alah, Leblon, Rio de Janeiro; Brazil
- Coordinates: 22.983577°S 43.215846°W
- Platforms: 2
- Tracks: 2

Construction
- Accessible: Yes

History
- Opened: July 30, 2016; 10 years ago
- Former names: Jardim de Alah

Passengers
- (Note: This section displays the total number of passengers reportedly transported in this station for a given year.)
- 2021: 2180173 ▲9.97%
- 2020: 1982532 ▼53.91%
- 2019: 4301893 ▲11.52%
- 2018: 3857583 ▲17.13%
- 2017: 3293466 ▲369.08%
- 2016: 702105 (Note: The station was only inaugurated in late July, so it was only operational for about 5 months in 2016 – hence the low passenger count then.)

Services
Preceding station	Rio de Janeiro Metro	Following station
Nossa Senhora da Paz towards General Osório	Line 4	Antero de Quental towards Jardim Oceânico
Location
- Location within Rio de Janeiro

Jardim de Alah / Leblon is a station on Line 4 of the Rio de Janeiro Metro located in the Leblon neighborhood of Rio de Janeiro, Brazil. The station opened alongside four others of Line 4 in late July 2016.

The station is named after the Jardim de Alah park across the street from it. It was previously simply named (and is still referred to as) Jardim de Alah, but was renamed alongside many others in August 2022 to include its neighborhood, Leblon, in the name.

== Nearby locations ==
- Leblon Shopping mall
- Lagoa Rodrigo de Freitas
- Beach of Leblon
- Beach of Ipanema
- Clube de Regatas do Flamengo's headquarters
