= Praça Onze Station =

Metro station in Rio de Janeiro, Brazil

Praça Onze
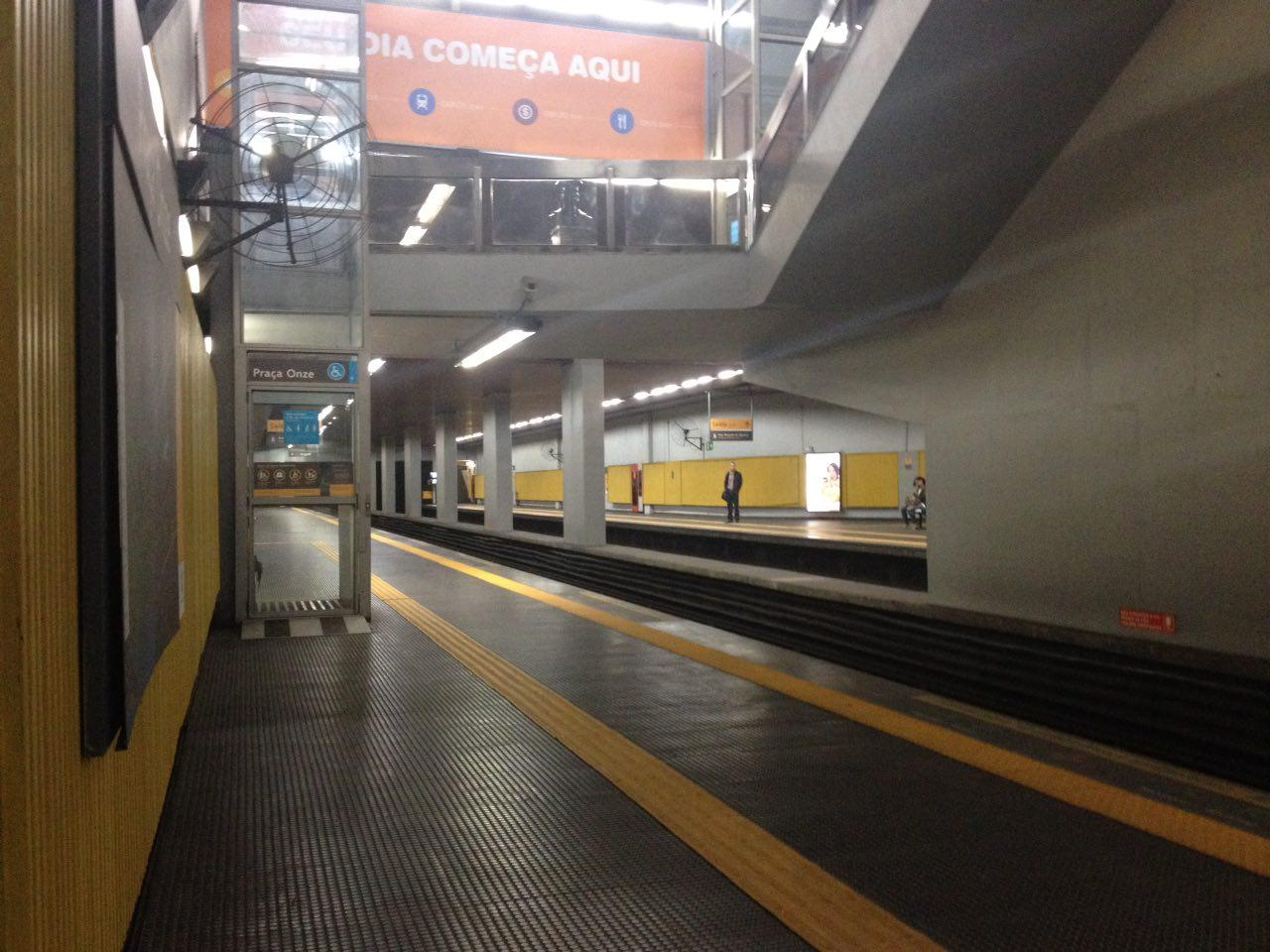
- The platforms and tracks in May 2015

General information
- Location: Cidade Nova, Rio de Janeiro; Brazil
- Coordinates: 22.9101381°S 43.2001557°W
- Operator: Metrô Rio
- Line: Line 1

Other information
- Station code: POZ

History
- Opened: 1979; 47 years ago

Services
Preceding station	Rio de Janeiro Metro	Following station
Estácio towards Uruguai	Line 1	Central do Brasil towards General Osório
Location
- Location within Rio de Janeiro

Praça Onze Station (Portuguese: Estação Praça Onze) is a subway station on the Rio de Janeiro Metro that services the Cidade Nova neighbourhood of Rio de Janeiro.
