= RioGaleão Light Rail =

Planned light rail line in Brazil

Overview
- Status: Proposed
- Owner: RioGaleão
- Locale: Rio de Janeiro, Brazil
- Termini: Estácio; Gelão
- Stations: 7 proposed

Service
- Type: Light rail
- System: Rio de Janeiro Metro
- Operator: RioGaleão

Technical
- Line length: 17 km (11 mi)
- Character: Elevated

The RioGaleão Light Rail is a proposed light rail line serving the Brazilian city of Rio de Janeiro.

The proposed line would be approximately 17 kilometres (11 mi) long and would have 7 stations, beginning at the Estácio Station (with connection to Rio de Janeiro Metro Line 1) and ending at the Galeão station, connecting the metro system directly to the Galeão Airport. It would be light rail, with trains with more cars than the current Rio light rail system, but less than the Rio metro system. Estácio station is expected to receive self check-in machines and passengers would be able to dispatch their luggage.

== See also ==
- Rio de Janeiro/Galeão International Airport
- Rio de Janeiro Metro
- Rio de Janeiro Light Rail
