= Afonso Pena Station =

Metro station in Rio de Janeiro, Brazil

Afonso Pena / Tijuca
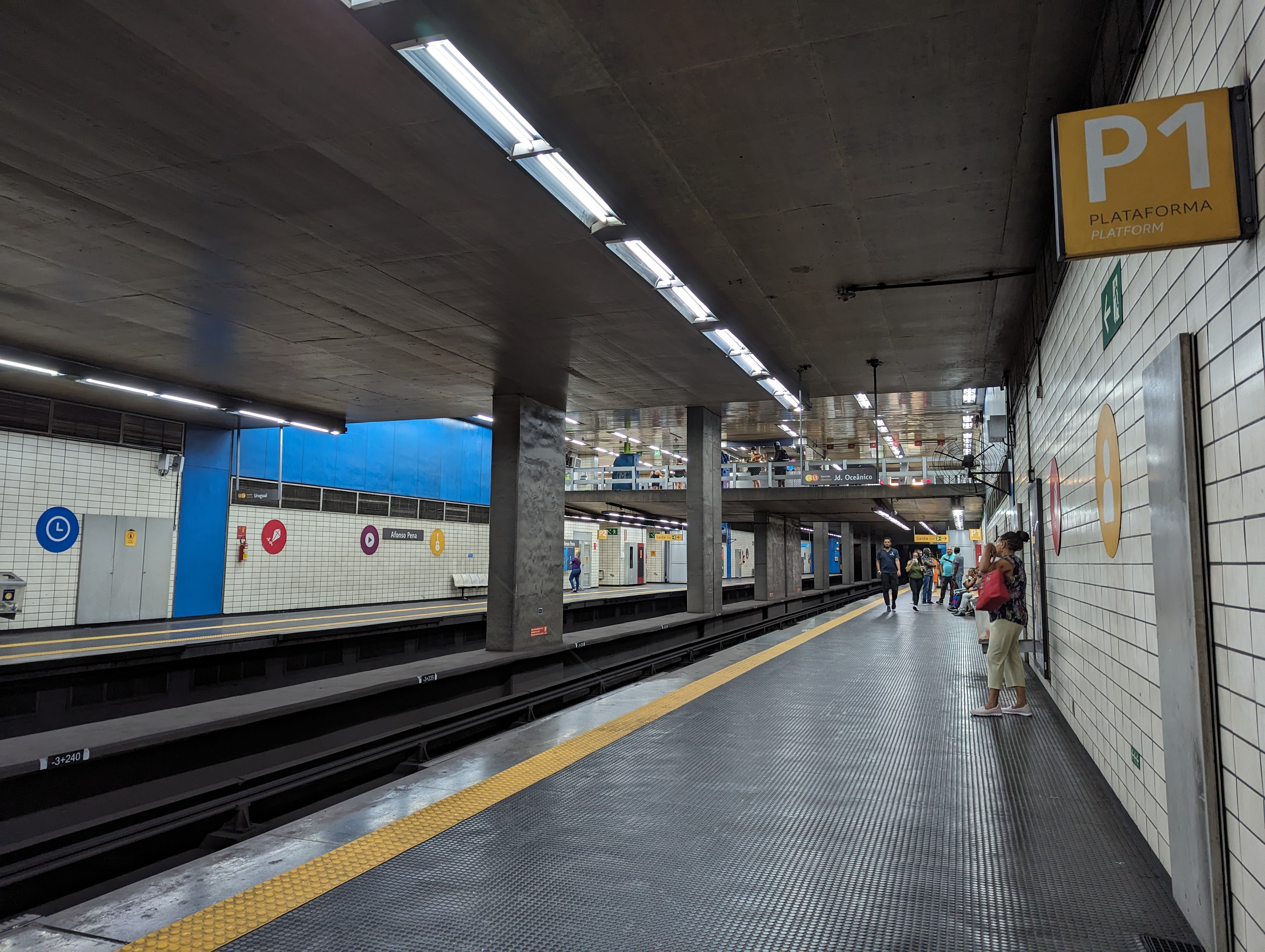

General information
- Location: Tijuca, Rio de Janeiro; Brazil
- Coordinates: 22.9185607°S 43.219254°W
- Operator: Metrô Rio
- Line: Line 1

Other information
- Station code: AFP

History
- Opened: 1982; 44 years ago

Services
Preceding station	Rio de Janeiro Metro	Following station
São Francisco Xavier towards Uruguai	Line 1	Estácio towards General Osório
Location
- Location within Rio de Janeiro

Afonso Pena / Tijuca Station (Portuguese: Estação Afonso Pena / Tijuca) is a subway station on the Rio de Janeiro Metro that services the neighbourhood of Tijuca in the North Zone of Rio de Janeiro.
