= Estácio =

Estácio may refer to:

== People ==
- Estácio Coimbra (1872–1937), Brazilian politician
- Estácio da Veiga (1828–1891), Portuguese archeologist
- Estácio de Sá (1520–1567), Portuguese soldier who was a founder of Rio de Janeiro, Brazil

== Places and institutions ==
- Estácio, Rio de Janeiro, a neighborhood in Rio de Janeiro, Brazil
- Estácio Station, a subway station in Rio de Janeiro, Brazil
- Estácio S.A., now known as YDUQS, an education company in Brazil
- Estácio de Sá University, in Rio de Janeiro, Brazil
- Estácio de Sá (samba school), in Rio de Janeiro, Brazil
