= Invepar =

Investimentos e Participações em Infraestrutura S.A. - Invepar
- Trade name: Investimentos e Participações em Infraestrutura S.A.
- Company type: Sociedade Anônima
- Traded as: B3: IVPR3B, IVPR4B
- Industry: Construction; Transportation
- Founded: 2000
- Headquarters: Rio de Janeiro, RJ, Brazil
- Products: Infrastructure construction, toll road and other transport concessions
- Website: www.invepar.com.br

Investimentos e Participações em Infraestrutura S.A. — Invepar, or Invepar S.A., is a private urban mobility and transit infrastructure management company headquartered in Rio de Janeiro, RJ, Brazil. The company holds 11 concessions through its subsidiary companies and joint ventures in the toll roads, airports and urban mobility segments.

In the toll roads segment, Invepar holds eight concessions in Brazil, including main and nearby corridors and access roads. In the airports segment, the company controls the concession-holder of São Paulo International Airport (GRU).

In the urban mobility segment, Invepar holds the Rio de Janeiro Light Rail concessions, controls Metrô Barra, and is responsible for the procurement and provision of rolling stock systems used on metro Line 4 in the state of Rio de Janeiro, which came into service in 2016. It held the Rio de Janeiro Metro concessions from 2009 to 2021, when it was sold to Mubadala Investment Company.

== Invepar airports ==
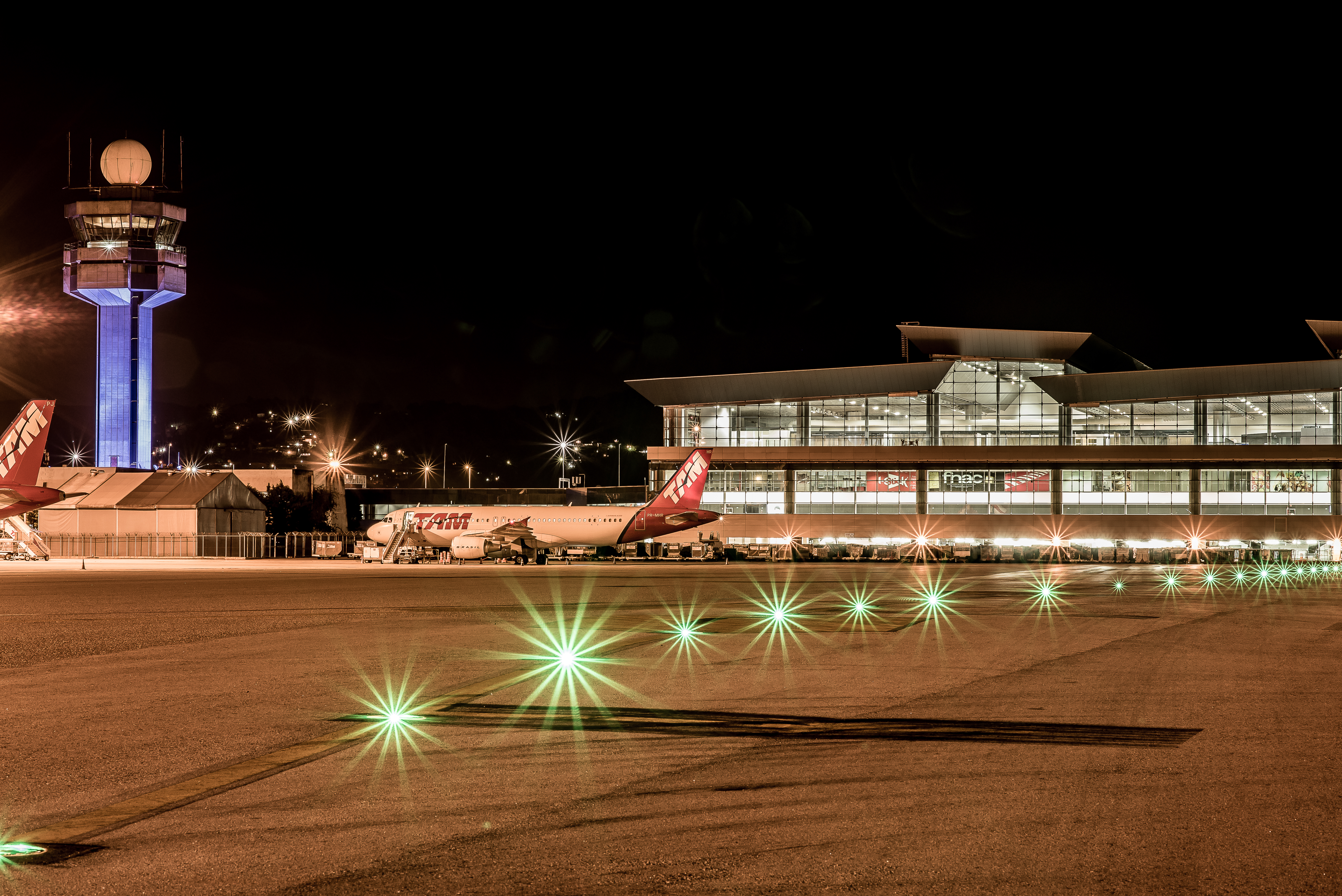
GRU Airport at night

São Paulo International Airport has been run by Concessionária do Aeroporto Internacional de Guarulhos S.A. since 2012. In 2017, a daily average of 104 thousand passengers passed through the airport, with around 800 takeoffs and landings every day. 37.8 million people boarded or deboarded almost 270 thousand flights in 2017. It is the main distribution hub for flights in Brazil, with 88 regular destinations, 46 international and 42 domestic.

GRU Airport is the biggest gateway for air cargo in Brazil, handling 43% of domestic volume.

== Invepar urban mobility ==
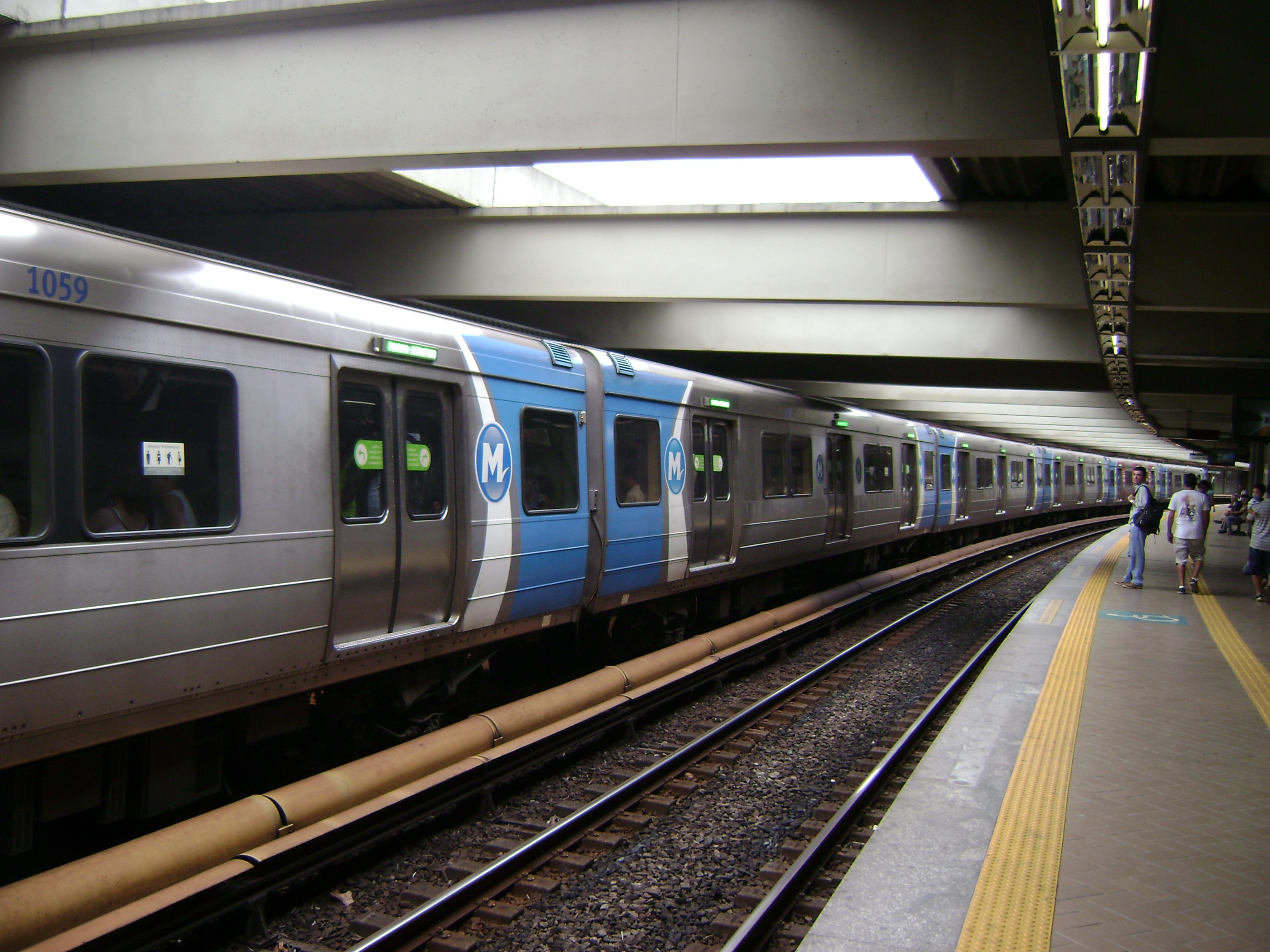
Metrô do Rio de Janeiro na estação São Cristóvão, próximo ao Centro Federal de Educação Tecnológica Celso Suckow da Fonseca campus Maracanã

Invepar was in charge of operating the Rio de Janeiro Metro Lines 1 and 2 since 2009. In 2017, over 240 million passengers traveled on these three Rio de Janeiro metro lines. In November 2021, the company sold the metro operations to Emirati holding company Mubadala Investment Company.

Invepar is a shareholder in Rio de Janeiro Light Rail that was inaugurated in 2016. This light rail service operates in the center of the city of Rio de Janeiro, with two lines totaling 28 km. Over 15 million passengers used this mode of transport in 2017.

Invepar controls Metrô Barra, and is responsible for the procurement and provision of rolling stock systems used on metro Line 4, which came into service in 2016.

== Invepar toll roads ==
Invepar controls eight toll roads, covering a distance of 2,337 km in five Brazilian states and the Federal District. These include main and nearby corridors and access roads.

In Rio de Janeiro, the company controls LAMSA – Linha Amarela S.A., ViaRio and CRT – Concessionária Rio-Teresópolis, in São Paulo, CART – Concessionária Auto Raposo Tavares, and in Minas Gerais, the Federal District and Goiás, Via040. In Bahia, CLN – Concessionária Litoral Norte and CBN – Concessionária Bahia Norte; and in Pernambuco, CRA – Concessionária Rota do Atlântico.
