= Saens Peña Station =

Metro station in Rio de Janeiro, Brazil

Saens Peña / Tijuca
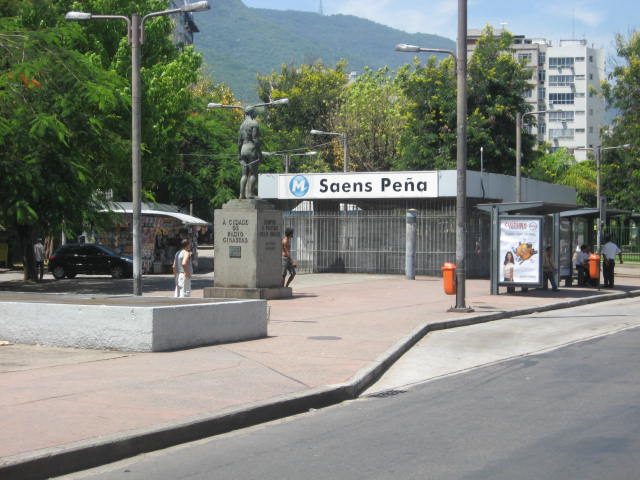
- Entrance to Saens Peña Station in Saenz Peña Place

General information
- Location: Tijuca, Rio de Janeiro; Brazil
- Coordinates: 22.9236526°S 43.2318928°W
- Operator: Metrô Rio
- Line: Line 1
- Platforms: 2
- Tracks: 3
- Connections: Integrated buses: 603 Usina; 608 Grajaú

Construction
- Structure type: Underground
- Accessible: Yes

Other information
- Station code: SPN

History
- Opened: 1982; 44 years ago

Services
Preceding station	Rio de Janeiro Metro	Following station
Uruguai Terminus	Line 1	São Francisco Xavier towards General Osório
Location
- Location within Rio de Janeiro

Saens Peña / Tijuca is a station on the Rio de Janeiro Metro that services the neighborhood of Tijuca in the North Zone of Rio de Janeiro.

The station, inaugurated in 1982, was named simply Saens Peña until August 2022 when, alongside many others, it was renamed to include its neighborhood, Tijuca, in the name.

== Passenger traffic ==
Historical passenger traffic

Year	Passengers	±%
1998	9,105,143	—
1999	10,182,198	+11.8%
2000	10,487,459	+3.0%
2001	10,063,969	−4.0%
2002	9,982,976	−0.8%
2003	9,651,933	−3.3%
2004	10,236,043	+6.1%
2005	11,864,483	+15.9%
2006	12,056,413	+1.6%
2007	12,520,139	+3.8%
2008	12,214,612	−2.4%
2009	11,977,007	−1.9%

Year	Passengers	±%
2010	11,350,660	−5.2%
2011	11,843,898	+4.3%
2012	12,045,724	+1.7%
2013	12,637,869	+4.9%
2014	10,394,953	−17.7%
2015	9,130,138	−12.2%
2016	9,089,765	−0.4%
2017	8,326,014	−8.4%
2018	7,956,573	−4.4%
2019	8,042,196	+1.1%
2020	3,674,416	−54.3%
2021	3,817,452	+3.9%

Note: This table displays the total number of passengers reportedly transported in the station in a given year.
Source: Rio de Janeiro Municipal Government.

== Nearby locations ==
- Saens Peña Square
- Shopping Tijuca mall
- Tijuca Tênis Clube
