= Estácio Station =

Metro station in Rio de Janeiro, Brazil

Estácio
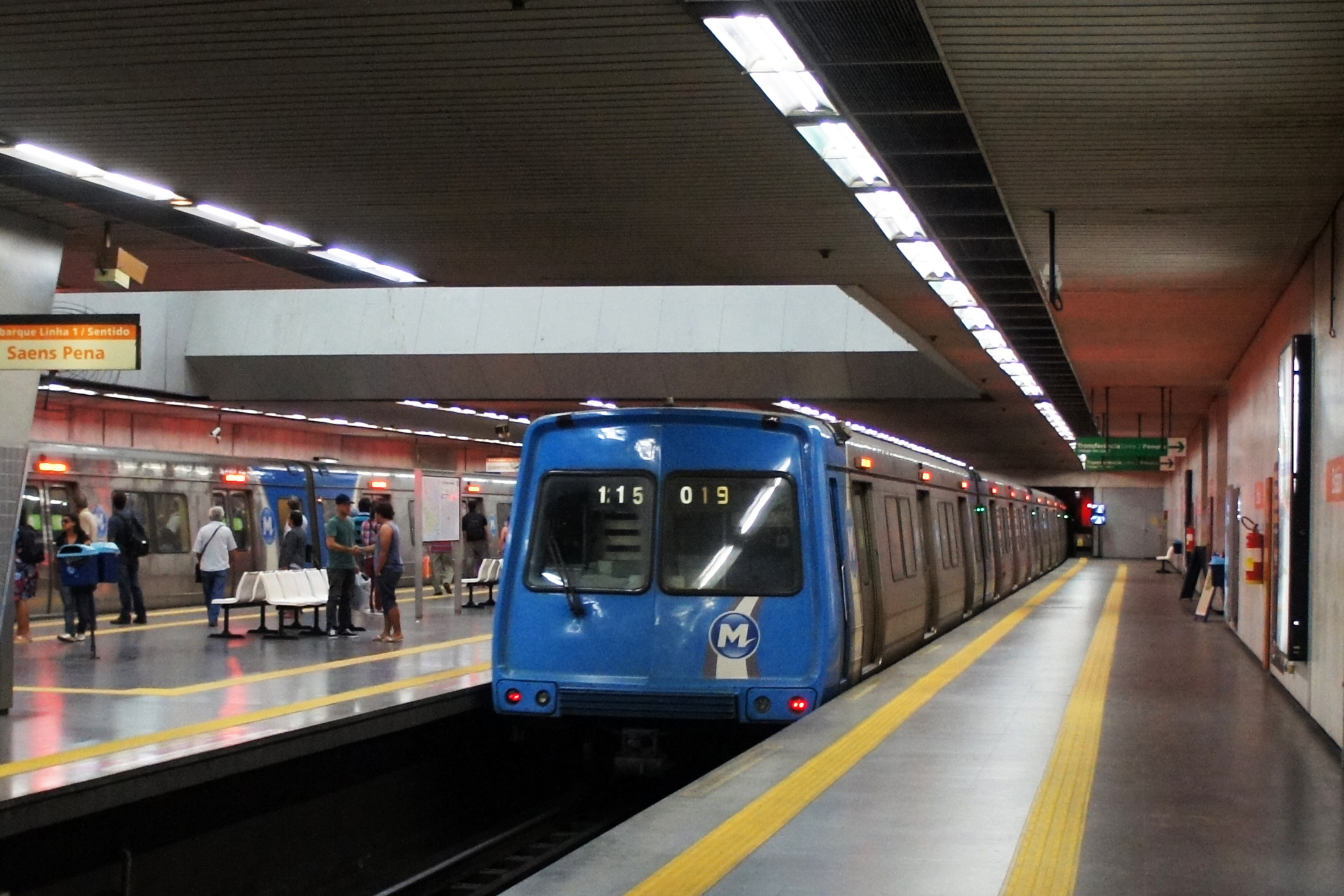
- Trains at Estácio station

General information
- Location: Rio de Janeiro; Brazil
- Coordinates: 22.9135058°S 43.2098689°W
- Operator: Metrô Rio
- Lines: Line 1 Line 2 (weekend and holidays only)

Other information
- Station code: ESA

History
- Opened: 1980; 46 years ago

Services
Preceding station	Rio de Janeiro Metro	Following station
Afonso Pena towards Uruguai	Line 1	Praça Onze towards General Osório

During maintenance
Preceding station	Rio de Janeiro Metro	Following station
São Cristóvão towards Pavuna	Line 2	Terminus
Location
- Location within Rio de Janeiro

Estácio Station (Portuguese: Estação Estácio) is a subway station on the Rio de Janeiro Metro that serves Estácio neighbourhood, in Rio de Janeiro.
