= General Osório Square =

Public square in Rio de Janeiro

- Praça General Osório
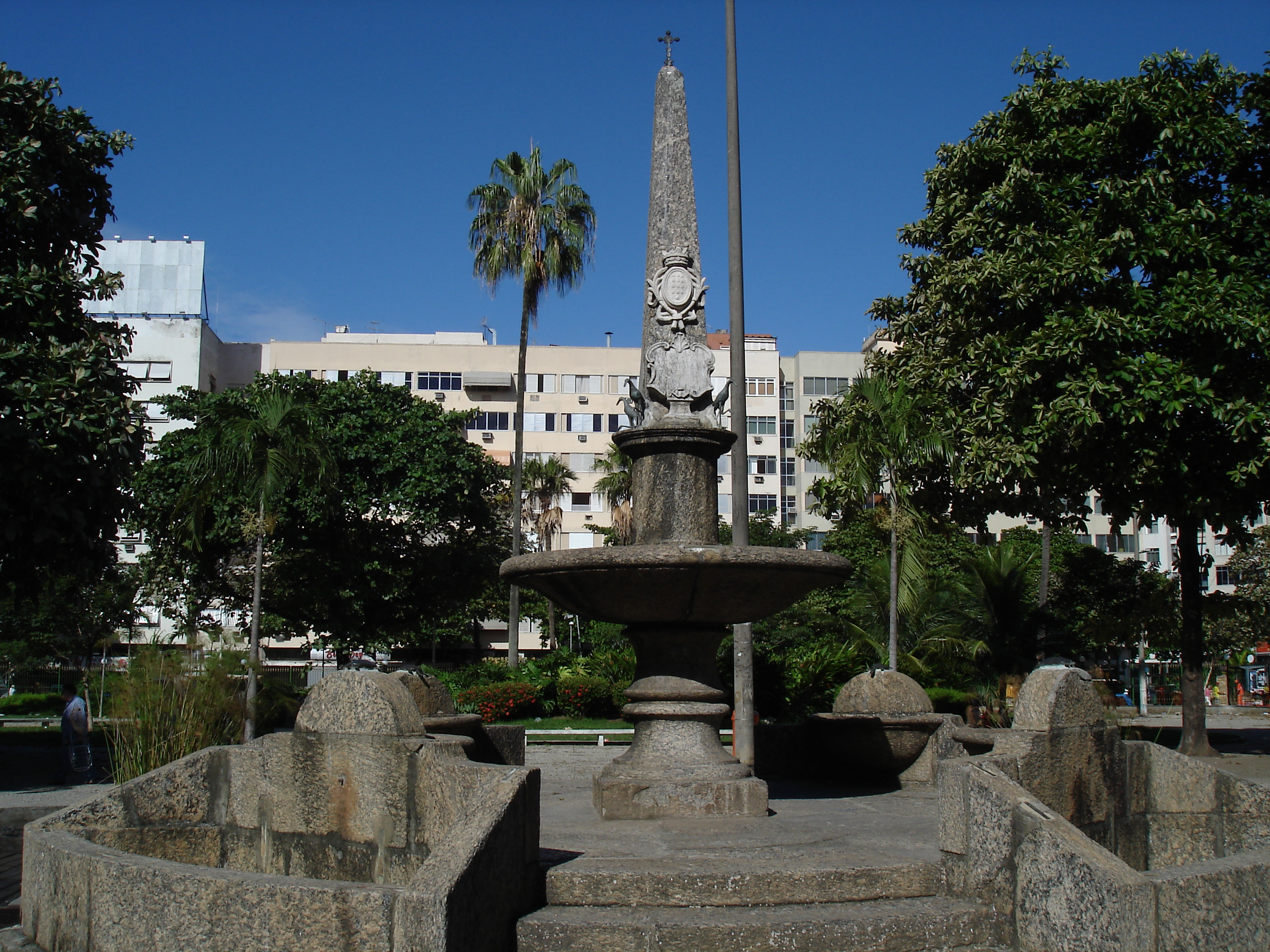
- Saracuras Fountain in General Osório Square

- Location within Rio de Janeiro Location within Brazil
- Type: Public square
- Location: Ipanema, Rio de Janeiro, Brazil
- Coordinates: 22°59′07″S 43°11′52″W
- Created: 19th century

General Osório Square (Portuguese: Praça General Osório) is a square in Ipanema, Rio de Janeiro, Brazil. The square is bordered to the north by Rua Visconde de Pirajá, the main commercial street in Ipanema; Rua Jangadeiros to the east; Rua Prudente de Morais to the south, which extends west from the square; and the small Rua Teixeira de Melo to the west.

General Osório Square was designed by José Antônio Moreira Filho, 2nd Baron of Ipanema (1830–1899), founder of Vila Ipanema, the precursor to the present-day neighborhood. The square was formerly called Praça Ferreira Viana, and later Praça Marechal Floriano Peixoto, In 1922 it was renamed in honor of Manuel Luís Osório, Marquis of Erval (1808–1879), a Brazilian military officer during the Paraguayan War. Saracuras Fountain, designed by Valentim da Fonseca e Silva in 1796 at the Convento da Ajuda, was moved to the square in 1911 after the demolition of the convent.

The square was home to a happening titled "Flags at General Osório Square" (Bandeiras na Praça General Osório) in February 1968. Numerous artists of the period, including Nelson Leirner, Flávio Mota, Carlos Scliar, Hélio Oiticica, and others, decorated the square with textile art on the eve of Carnival. While the happening was not overtly political and attracted little attention from the military police, it closely predated the murder of Edson Luís de Lima Souto in March 1968 and the subsequent March of the One Hundred Thousand against the violence of the military regime. The Sunday Hippie Fair (Feira Hippie de Ipanema) at General Osório Square, a weekly art fair, dates to the same year.

General Osório Station, the terminal station of Line 1 of the Rio de Janeiro Metro, opened in December 2009 northeast of the square.
