= Line 4 (Rio de Janeiro) =

Metro line in Rio de Janeiro

Rio de Janeiro Metro Line 4 (Yellow)

Overview
- Status: Operational
- Owner: Government of the State of Rio de Janeiro
- Locale: Rio de Janeiro, Brazil
- Termini: General Osório; Jardim Oceânico
- Stations: 6

Service
- Type: Rapid transit
- System: Rio de Janeiro Metro
- Operator: MetrôRio

History
- Opened: 30 July 2016

Technical
- Line length: 16 km (9.9 mi)
- Track gauge: 1,600 mm (5 ft 3 in)
- Electrification: DC third rail
- Operating speed: 80 km/h (50 mph)

Line 4 (Yellow) of the Rio de Janeiro Metro is the third metro line built in the city of Rio de Janeiro. It was completed on 30 July 2016, connecting the Barra da Tijuca neighbourhood in the West Zone, passing under São Conrado and Rocinha, to Ipanema in the South Zone. All stations are underground, but when arriving in Barra da Tijuca, trains exit a tunnel, pass briefly by an elevated bridge and go underground again.

At first, the line was only open to those with a ticket to events of the 2016 Summer Olympics and members of the Olympic Family. It later opened to the general public, in September 2016.

There were six exclusive stations planned for Line 4: Jardim Oceânico, São Conrado, Gávea, Antero de Quental, Jardim de Alah and Nossa Senhora da Paz. However, as of April 2023, Gávea Station remains incomplete, and is the only planned station for Line 4 that is not operational.
