= Copacabana, Rio de Janeiro =

Neighborhood of Rio de Janeiro, Rio de Janeiro, Brazil

Copacabana
- Neighborhood of Rio de Janeiro
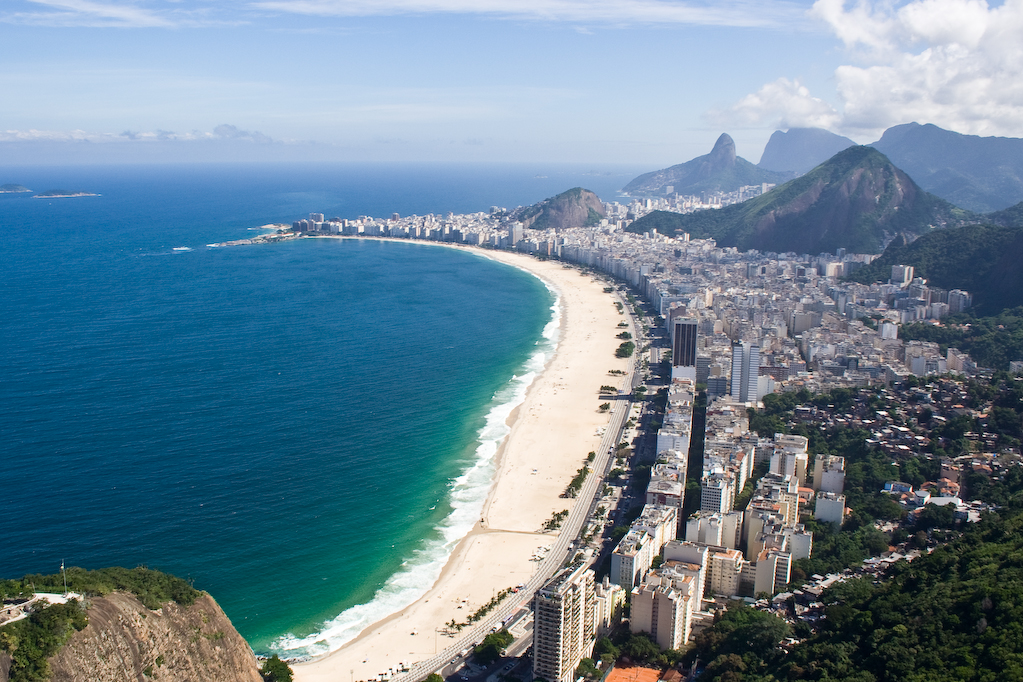

- Location in Rio de Janeiro Copacabana (Brazil)
- Coordinates: 22°58′1″S 43°10′50″W
- Country: Brazil
- State: Rio de Janeiro (RJ)
- Municipality/City: Rio de Janeiro
- Zone: South Zone

Area
  - Total: 5.220 km^{2} (2.015 sq mi)

Population
  - Total: 160,000
  - Density: 20,400/km^{2} (53,000/sq mi)

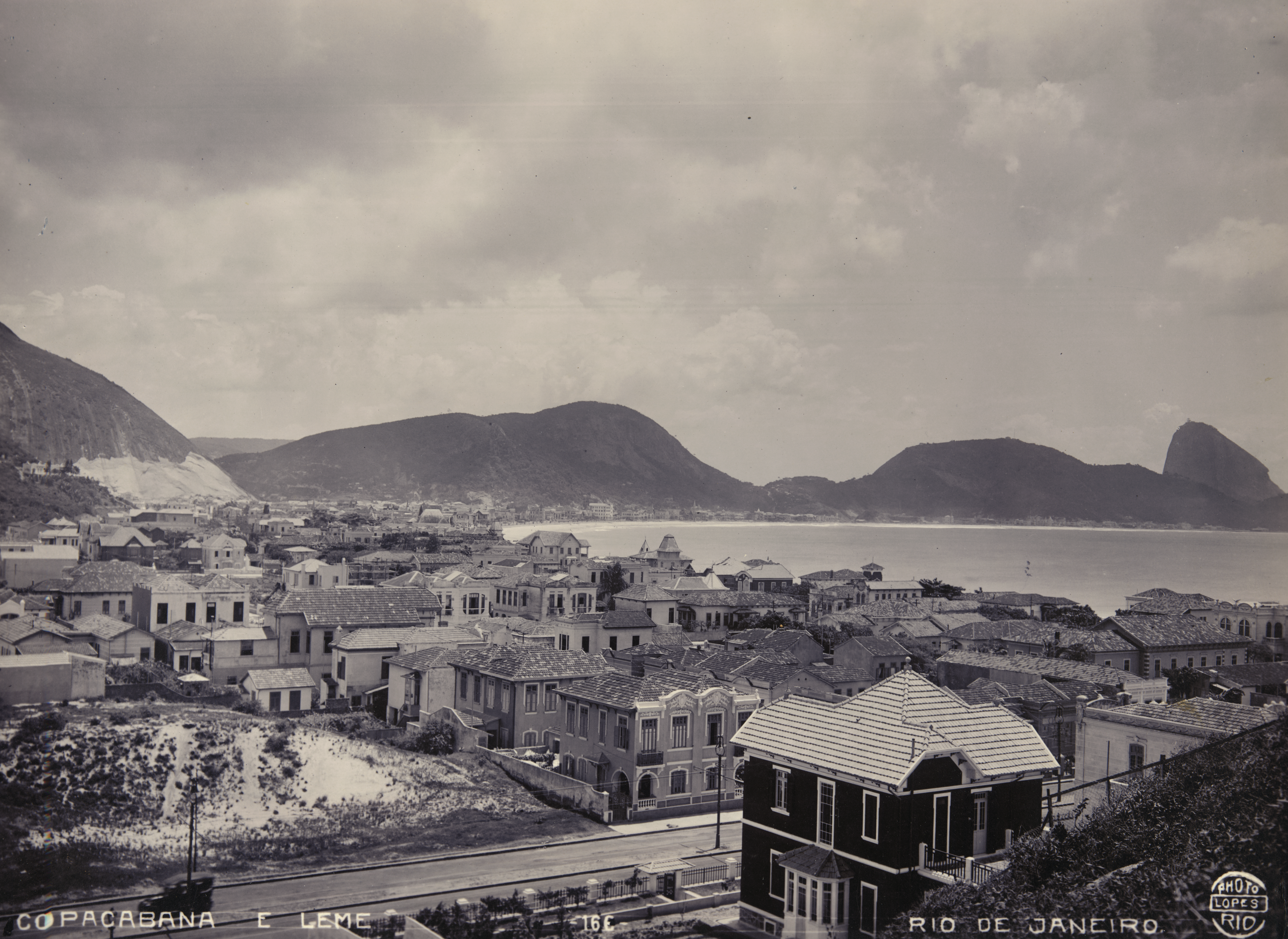
Copacabana, early 20th century

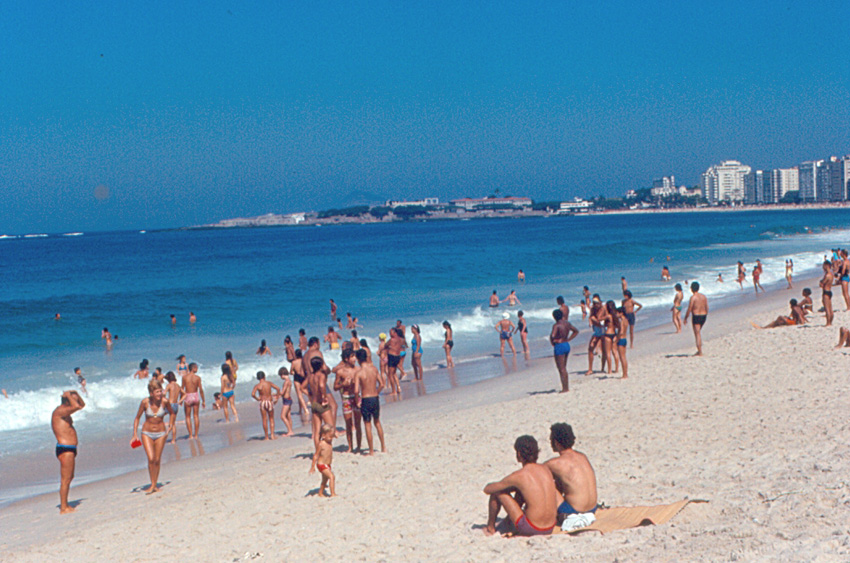
Copacabana Beach in 1971

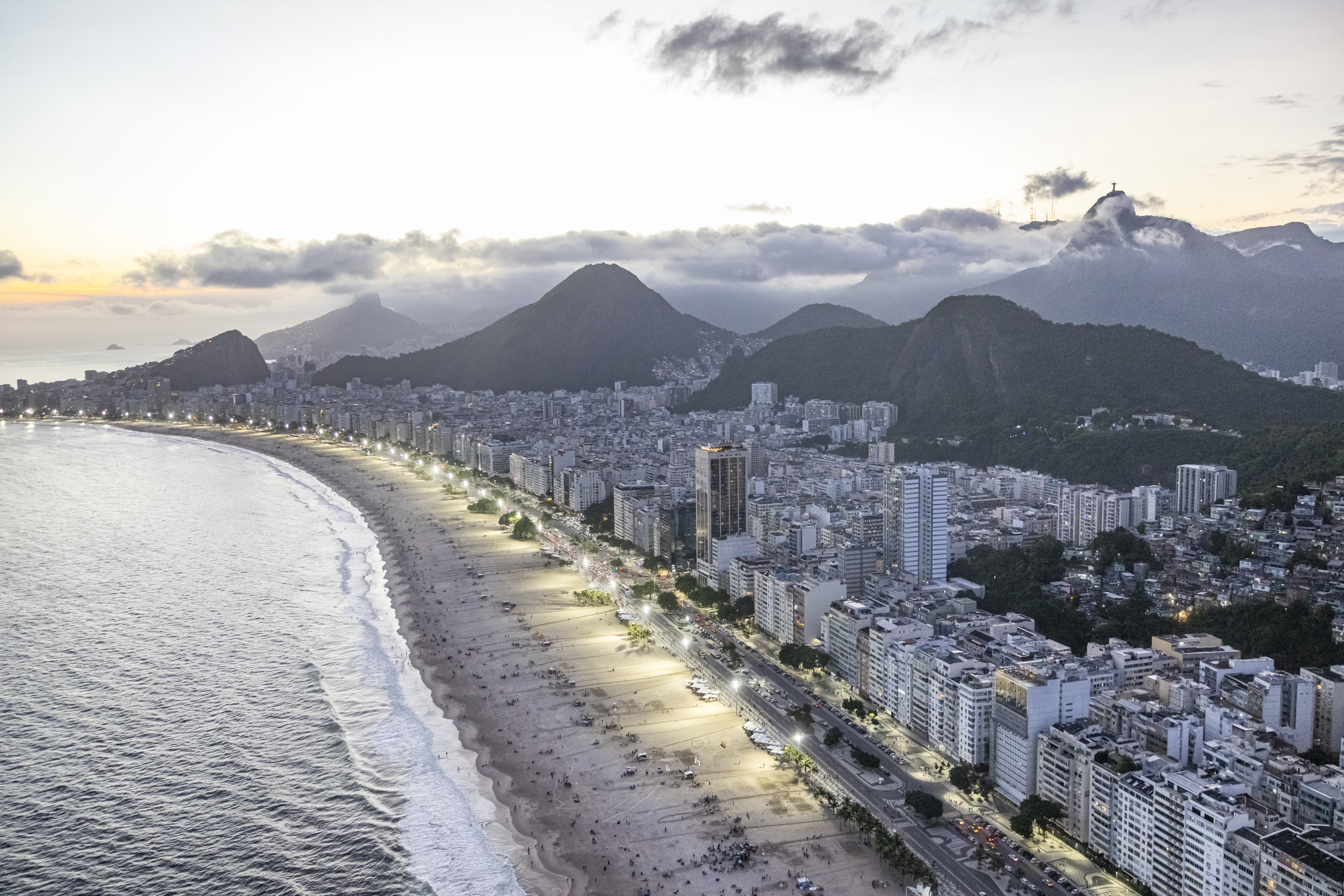
Aerial view of Copacabana

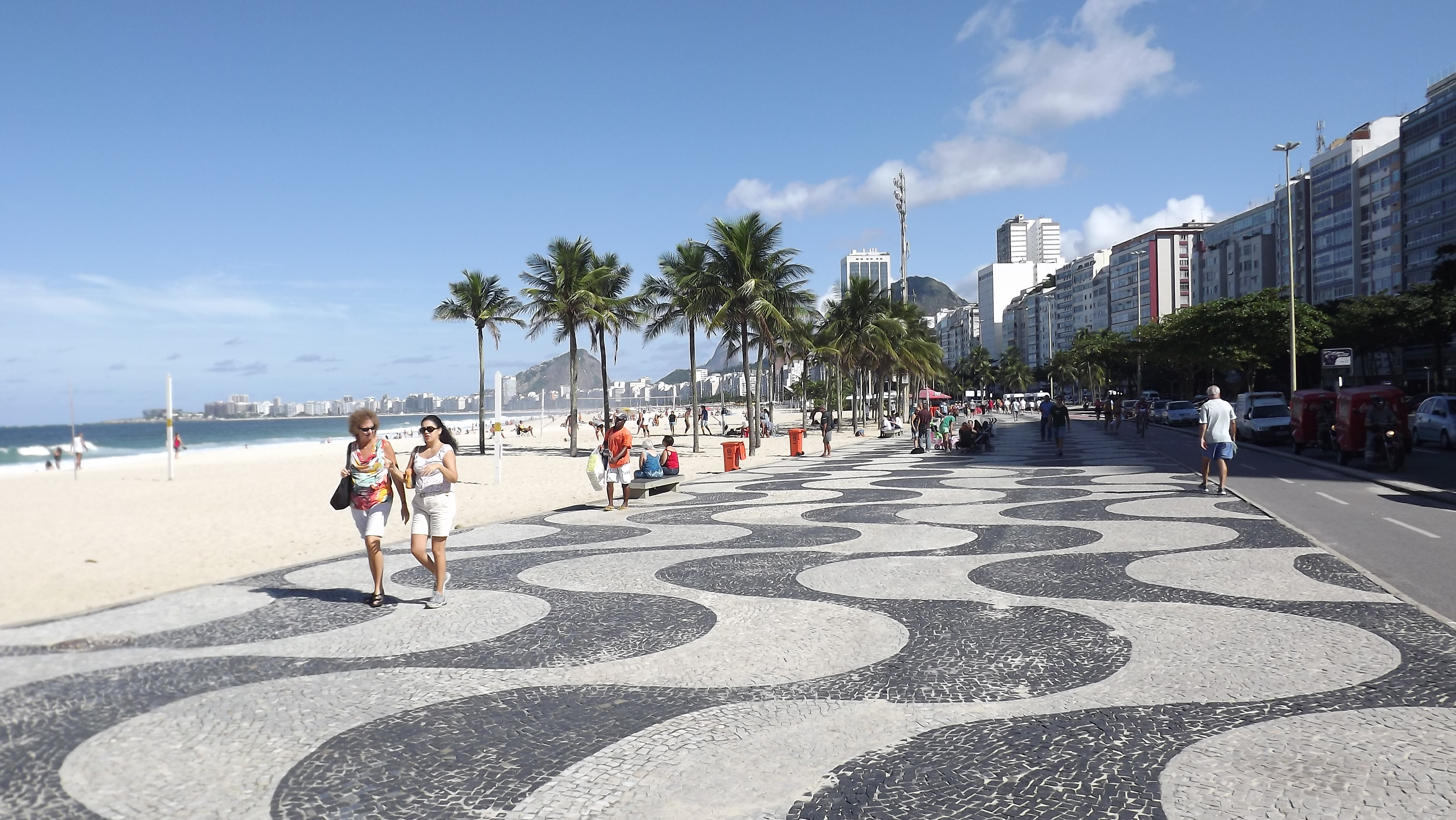
The Portuguese pavement wave pattern at Copacabana beach

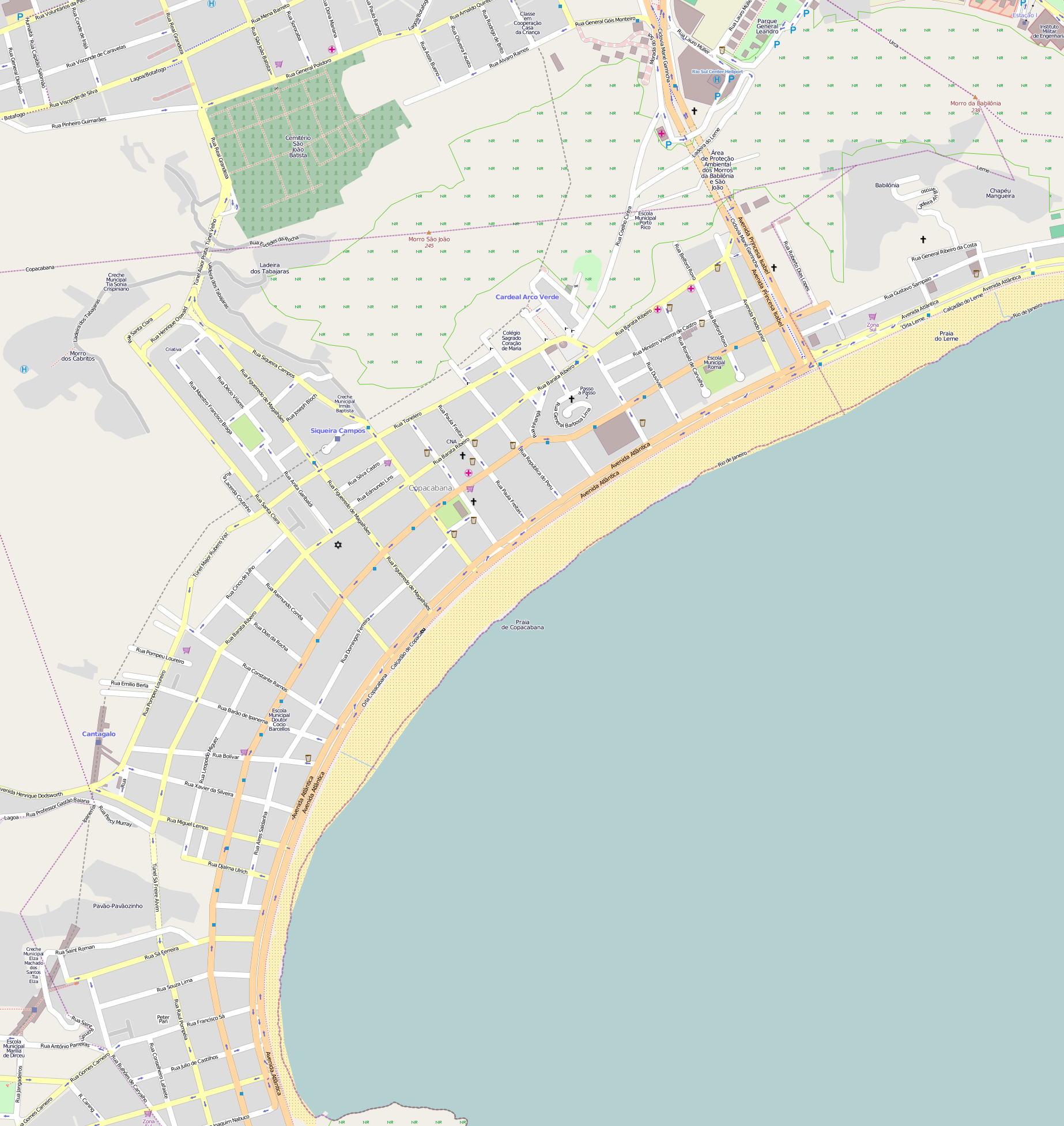
Map of Copacabana

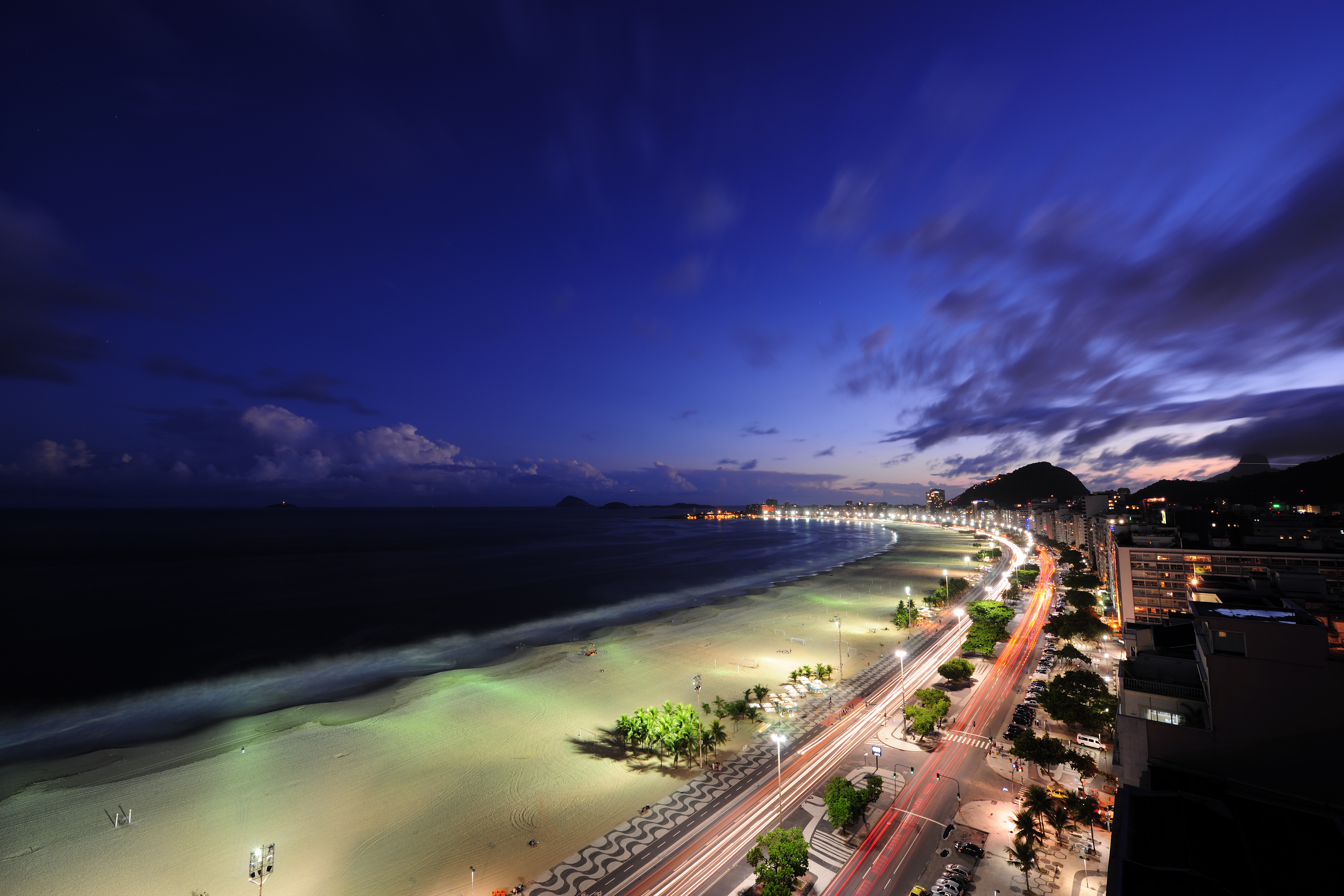
Copacabana at dusk

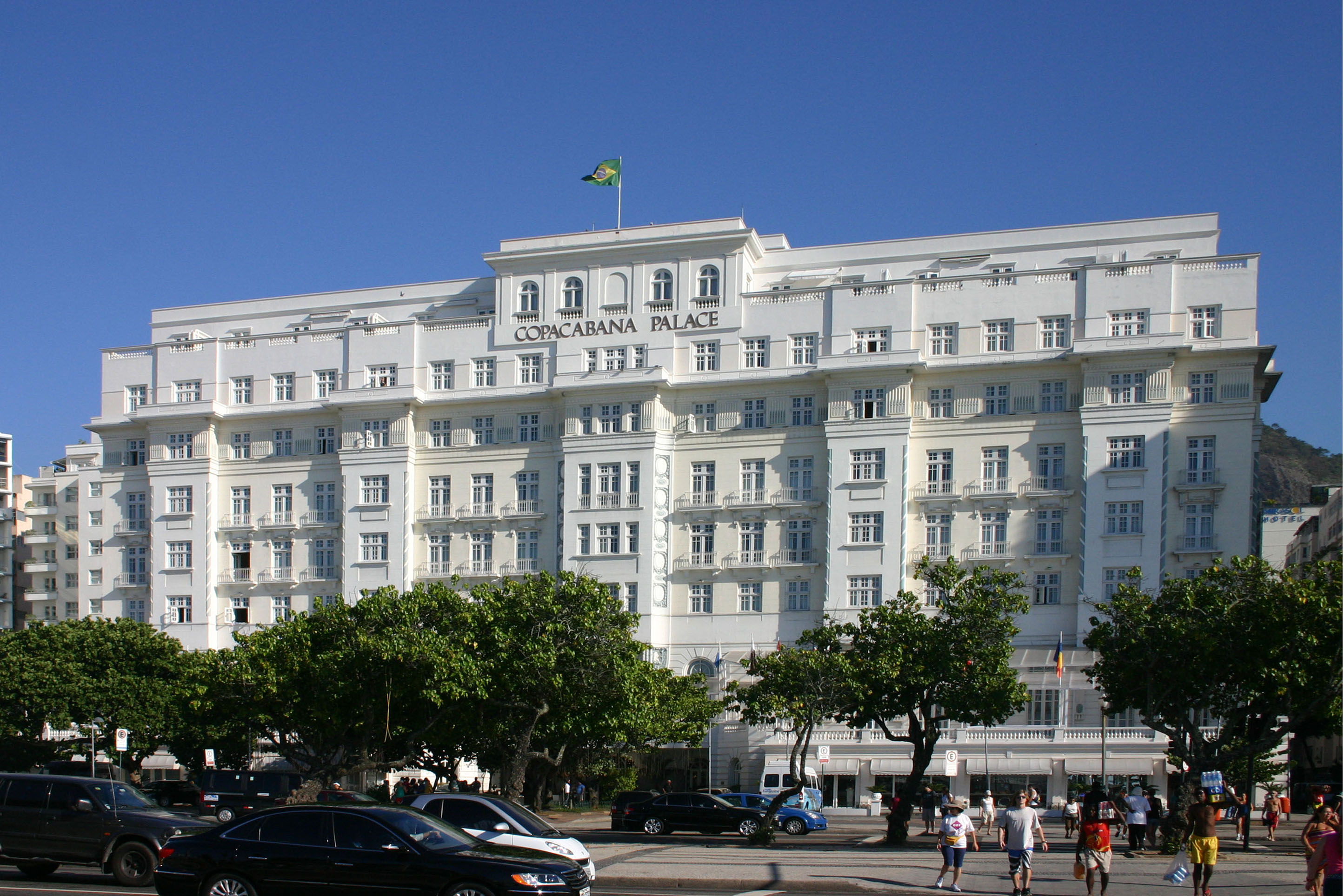
The Copacabana Palace Hotel

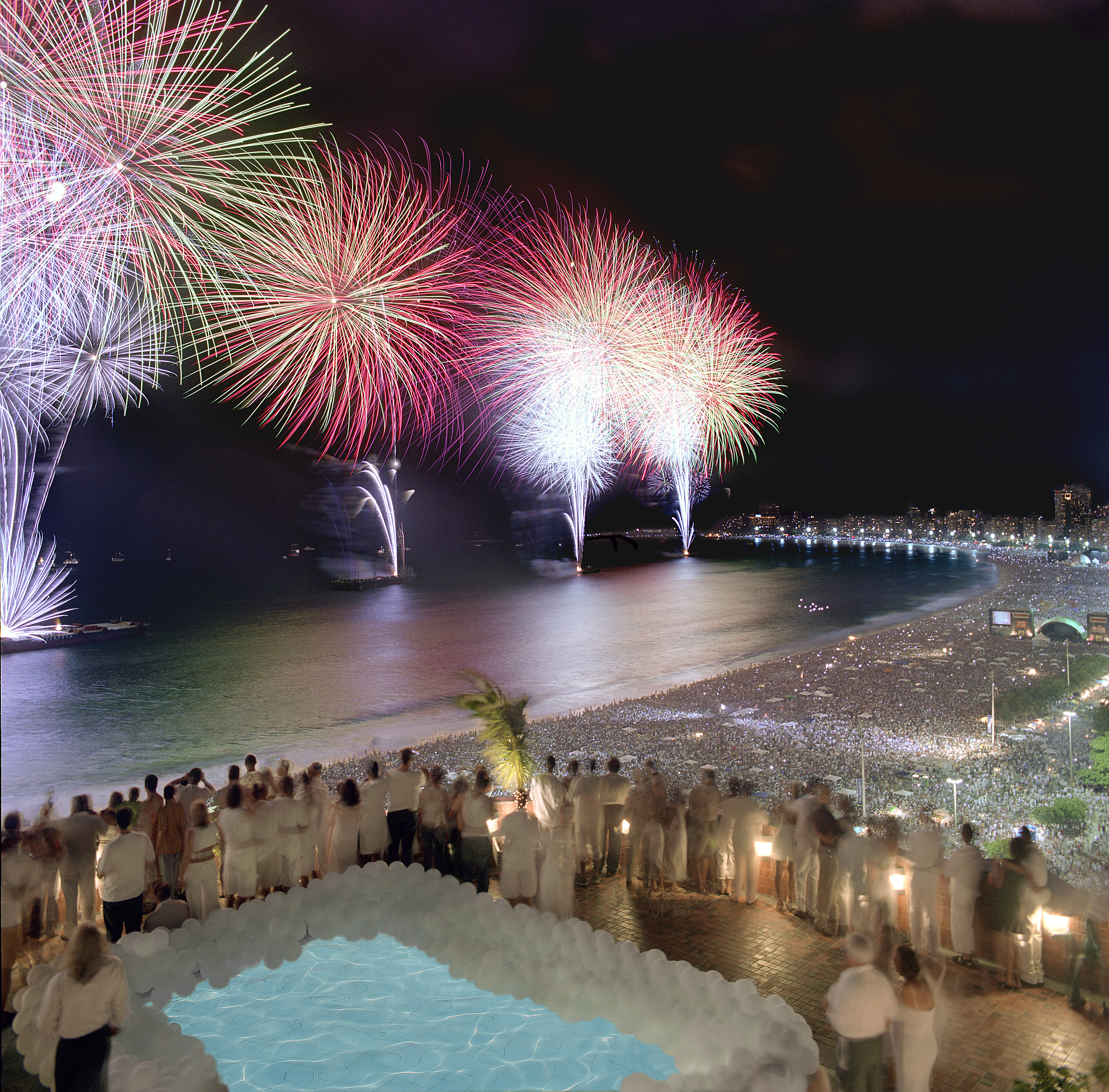
Fireworks at the celebrations of the New Year

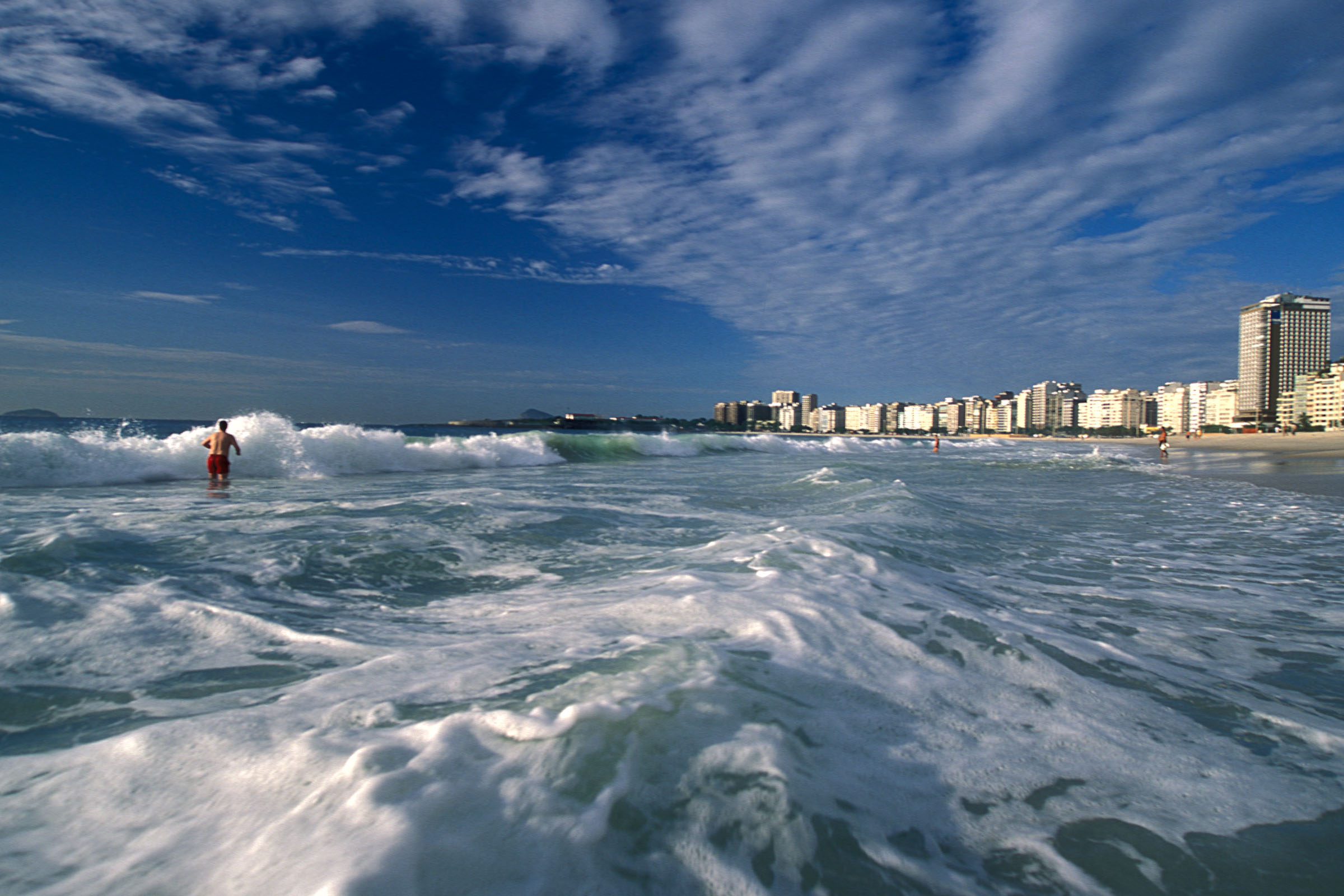
Copacabana sea waters

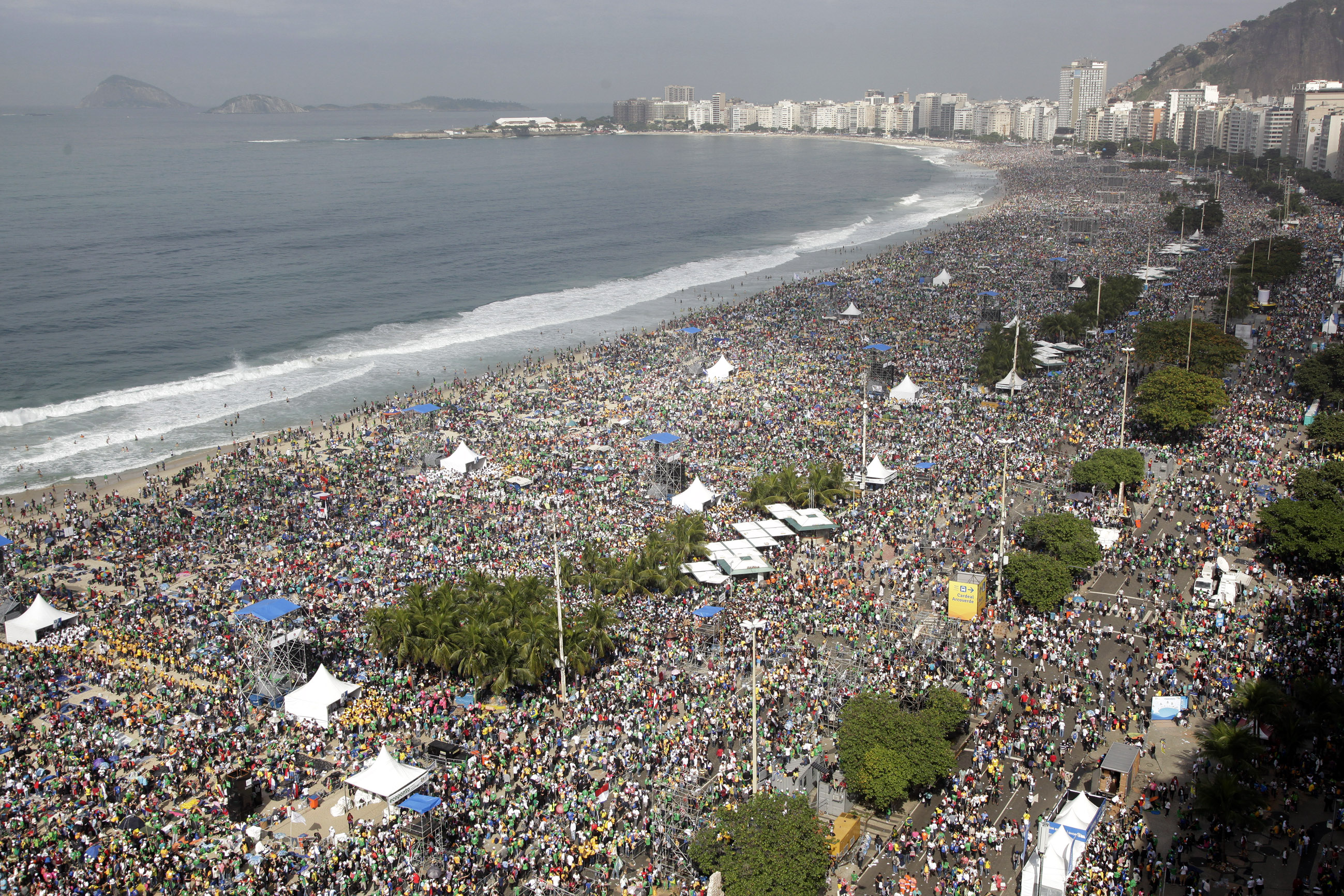
Copacabana Beach on World Youth Day 2013

Copacabana (/ˌkoʊpəkəˈbænə/ KOH-pə-kə-BAN-ə, US also /-ˈbɑːnə/ -BAH-nə; Brazilian Portuguese: [ˌkɔpakaˈbɐnɐ]) is a Brazilian bairro (neighbourhood) located in the South Zone of the city of Rio de Janeiro, Brazil. It is most prominently known for its 4 km (2.5 mile) balneario beach, which is one of the most famous in the world.

== History ==
The district was originally called Sacopenapã (translated from the Tupi language, meaning "the way of the socós", the socós being a kind of heron) until the mid-18th century. It was renamed after the construction of a chapel holding a replica of the statue of Our Lady of Copacabana, the patron saint of Bolivia.

== Characteristics ==
Copacabana begins at Princess Isabel Avenue and ends at Post (lifeguard watchtower six). Beyond Copacabana, there are two small beaches: one, inside Fort Copacabana and the other, right after it: Diabo ("Devil") Beach. Arpoador beach, where surfers go for its perfect waves, comes next, followed by the famous borough of Ipanema. The area served as one of the four "Olympic Zones" during the 2016 Summer Olympics. According to Riotur, the Tourism Secretariat of Rio de Janeiro, as of 2007 there were 63 hotels and 10 hostels in Copacabana.

== Copacabana Beach ==
Copacabana beach, located at the Atlantic shore, stretches from Posto Dois (lifeguard watchtower Two) to Post o Se's (lifeguard watchtower Six). Leme is at Posto Um (lifeguard watchtower One). There are historic forts at both ends of Copacabana beach; Fort Copacabana, built in 1914, is at the south end by Posto Seis and Fort Duque de Caxias, built in 1779, at the north end. Many hotels, restaurants, bars, nightclubs, and residential buildings are located in the area. On Sundays and holidays, one side of Avenida Atlântica is closed to cars, giving residents and tourists more space for activities along the beach.

Copacabana Beach plays host to millions of revellers during the annual New Year's Eve celebrations, and for the first three editions of the tournament, it has been the official venue of the FIFA Beach Soccer World Cup.

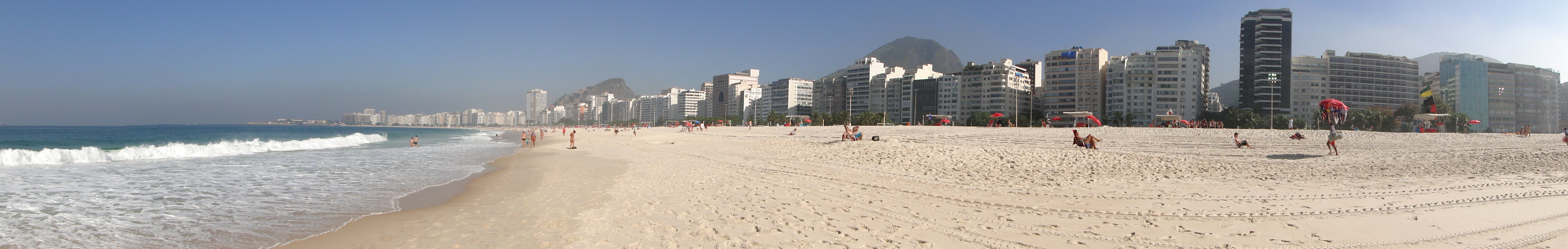
Panorama of the Copacabana beach

== Copacabana promenade ==
The Copacabana promenade is a paved landscape on a large scale (4 kilometres long). It was rebuilt in 1970 and has used a black-and-white Portuguese pavement design since its origin in the 1930s: a geometric wave. The Copacabana promenade was designed by Roberto Burle Marx.

== Living standard ==
Copacabana has the 12th highest Human Development Index in Rio; the 2000 census put the HDI of Copacabana at 0.902.

== Neighbourhood ==
According to the IBGE, 160,000 people live in Copacabana and 44,000 or 27.5% of them are 60 years old or older. Copacabana covers an area of 5.220 km^{2}, which gives the borough a population density of 20,400 people per km^{2}. Residential buildings eleven to thirteen stories high built next to each other dominate the borough. Houses and two-story buildings are rare.

When Rio was the capital of Brazil, Copacabana was considered one of the best neighborhoods in the country.

== Transportation ==
More than 40 different bus routes serve Copacabana, as do three subway Metro stations: Cantagalo, Siqueira Campos and Cardeal Arcoverde.

Three major arteries parallel to each other cut across the entire borough: Avenida Atlântica (Atlantic Avenue), which is a 6-lane, 4 km avenue by the beachside; Nossa Senhora de Copacabana Avenue and Barata Ribeiro/Raul Pompéia Street, both of which are 4 lanes and 3.5 km in length. Barata Ribeiro Street changes its name to Raul Pompéia Street after the Sá Freire Alvim Tunnel. Twenty-four streets intersect all three major arteries, and seven other streets intersect some of the three.

== Notable events ==
- On April 26, 1949, RMS Magdalena broke in two as she was being towed into Rio de Janeiro harbour. Much of her cargo of oranges was washed up upon the beach.
- On December 31, 1994, the New Year's Eve celebrations featured a Rod Stewart concert with an attendance of 4.5 million, making it the largest concert crowd ever. More recently, the beach has been a site for huge free concerts unrelated to the year-end festivities. On March 21, 2005, Lenny Kravitz performed there in front of 300,000 people, as part of his Electric Church Tour. On February 18, 2006, The Rolling Stones brought their A Bigger Bang Tour, surpassing that mark by far and attracting over 1.5 million people to the beach.
- On July 7, 2007, the beach hosted the Brazilian leg of the Live Earth concerts, which attracted 400,000 people. As the headliner, Lenny Kravitz played the venue a second time, with Jorge Benjor, Macy Gray, O Rappa and Pharrell as the main opening acts.
- On October 2, 2009, 100,000 people filled the beach for a huge party waiting for the IOC announcement of the host city of the 2016 Summer Olympics.
- 11 of the 15 FIFA Beach Soccer World Cups have taken place here.
- On July 28, 2013, the beach hosted the final event of the World Youth Day 2013. About 3 million people, including 3 presidents, joined Pope Francis when he celebrated the holy mass.
- From May to July, 2014, the United Buddy Bears exhibit was held on the Copacabana promenade and attracted more than 1,000,000 people. The presentation consisted of more than 140 bear sculptures, each two metres high and designed by a different artist.
- In August 2016, Copacabana Beach was the site of beach volleyball in the 2016 Summer Olympics.
- On May 4, 2024, Madonna performed the final show of the Celebration Tour as a free event and part of "Todo Mundo no Rio", a new initiative highlighting the economic benefits of entertainment in Rio de Janeiro, to an audience of more than 1,600,000 attendees, the largest live crowd of her career.
- On May 3, 2025, Lady Gaga performed a "Mayhem on the Beach" concert as a free event and also as part of the "Todo Mundo no Rio" project, attracting an estimated 2,100,000 attendees, the largest crowd for a female artist in history.
- On May 2, 2026, Shakira performed a concert based on "Las Mujeres Ya No Lloran World Tour", also a free event in the "Todo Mundo no Rio" project.
- The official emblem of the 2027 Women's World Cup was unveiled on 25 January 2026 during an event at Copacabana in Rio de Janeiro.

== New Year's Eve ==
The fireworks display in Rio de Janeiro to celebrate New Year's Eve is one of the largest in the world, lasting 15 to 20 minutes. It is estimated that 2 million people go to Copacabana Beach to see the spectacle. The festival also includes a concert that extends throughout the night. The celebration has become one of the biggest tourist attractions of Rio de Janeiro, attracting visitors from all over Brazil as well as from different parts of the world, and the city hotels generally stay fully booked. The celebration is broadcast live on major Brazilian radio and television networks, including TV Globo.

=== History ===
New Year's Eve has been celebrated on Copacabana beach since the 1950s, when cults of African origin such as Candomblé and Umbanda gathered in small groups dressed in white for ritual celebrations. The first fireworks display occurred in 1976, sponsored by a hotel on the waterfront, and this has been repeated ever since. In the 1990s, the city saw it as a great opportunity to promote the city and organized and expanded the event.

An assessment made during New Year's Eve 1992 highlighted the risks associated with increasing crowd numbers on Copacabana beach after the fireworks display. Since the 1993-94 event, concerts have been held on the beach to retain the public. The result was a success, with egress spaced out over a period of 2 hours without the previous turmoil, although critics claimed that it denied the spirit of the New Year's tradition of a religious festival with fireworks by the sea. The following year Rod Stewart beat attendance records. Finally, the Tribute to Tom Jobim - with Gal Costa, Gilberto Gil, Caetano Veloso, Chico Buarque, and Paulinho da Viola - consolidated the shows at the Copacabana Réveillon.

There was a need to transform the fireworks display into a show of the same quality. The fireworks display was created by entrepreneurs Ricardo Amaral and Marius. From the previous 8–10 minutes, the time was extended to 20 minutes, and the quality and diversity of the fireworks were improved. A technical problem in 2000 required the use of ferries from New Year's Eve 2001–02. New Year's Eve has begun to compete with the Carnival, and since 1992 it has been a tourist attraction in its own right.

There was no celebration in 2020–21 due to the COVID-19 pandemic, but the fireworks show went on.

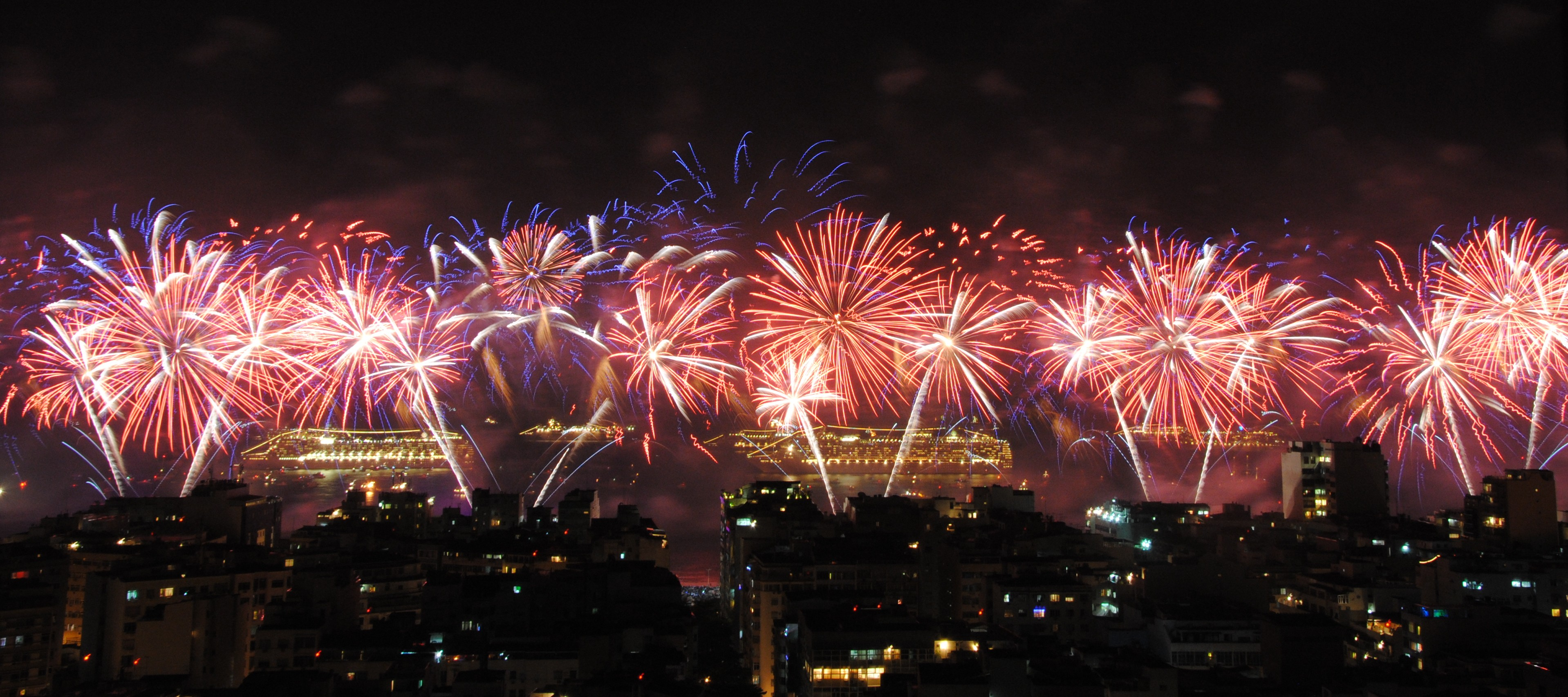
Fireworks in Copacabana
