= Teatro Ziembinski =

Theatre in Rio de Janeiro, Brazil

General information
- Location: Rio de Janeiro, Brazil

Teatro Ziembinski is a theatre in Rio de Janeiro, Brazil. It was named after Zbigniew Ziembinski, who was director of the Teatro Serrador in the 1960s.
