= Nossa Senhora da Paz Station =

Rapid transit station in Rio de Janeiro, Brazil

Nossa Senhora da Paz Station Estação Nossa Senhora da Paz / Ipanema

General information
- Location: Praça Nossa Senhora da Paz; Rio de Janeiro; Brazil
- Platforms: 2
- Tracks: 2

History
- Opened: 2016
Location

Nossa Senhora da Paz/Ipanema Station is a metro stop of the Rio de Janeiro Metro's line 4, located in the Ipanema neighborhood, between the Jardim de Alah and General Osorio stations. The station is located under the Nossa Senhora da Paz square. It was inaugurated in 2016 together with the rest of line 4.
