= Jardim Oceânico Station =

Metro station in Rio de Janeiro, Brazil

Jardim Oceânico / Barra da Tijuca
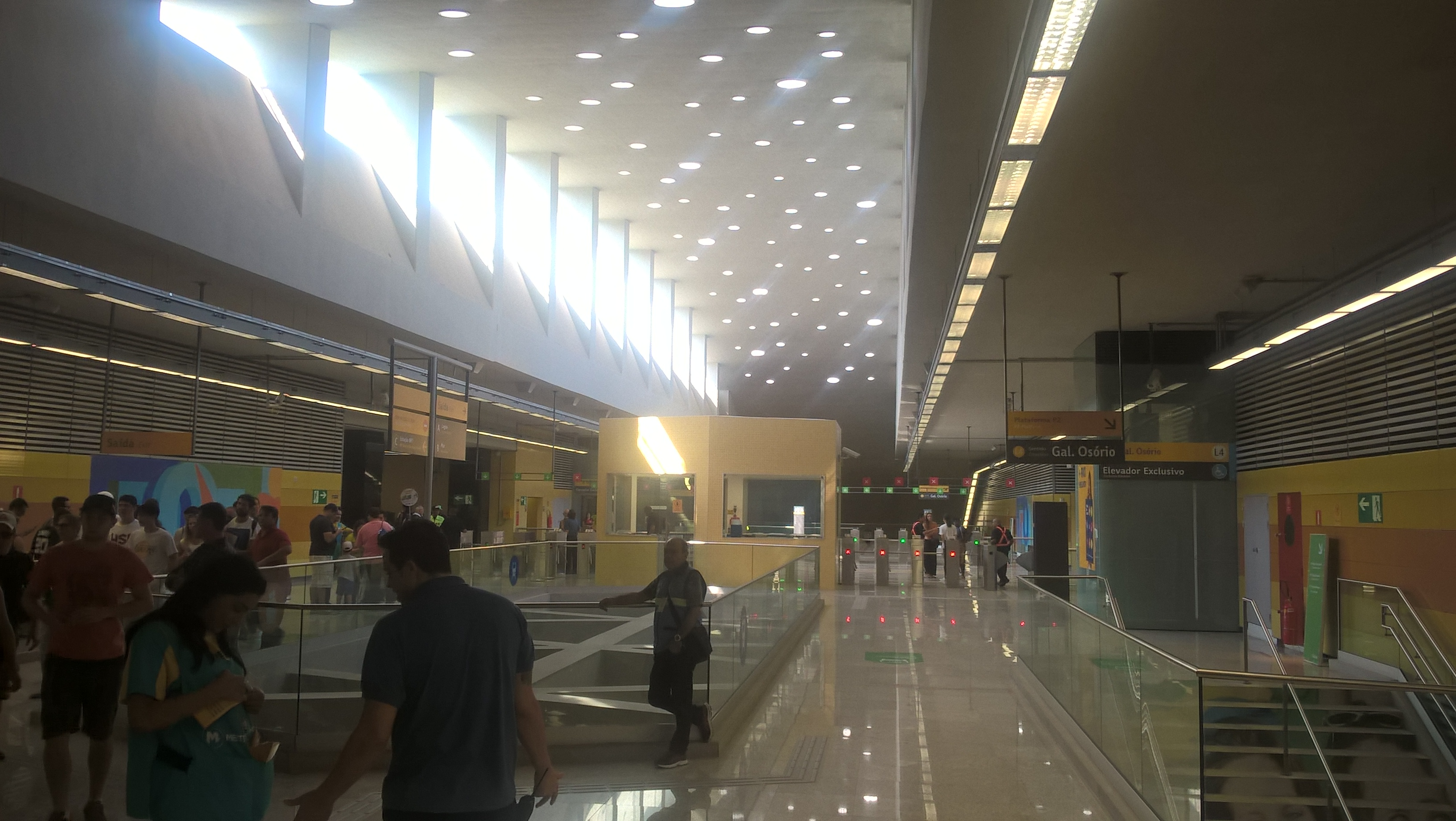
- Station lobby, one floor above the platforms

General information
- Location: Av. Armando Lombardi, 32; Barra da Tijuca, Rio de Janeiro; Brazil
- Coordinates: 23°0′23.985″S 43°18′45.942″W
- Platforms: 2
- Tracks: 2
- Connections: BRT TransOeste

Construction
- Cycle facilities: Yes
- Accessible: Yes

History
- Opened: 30 July 2016
- Former names: Jardim Oceânico

Services
Preceding station	Rio de Janeiro Metro	Following station
São Conrado towards General Osório	Line 4	Terminus
Location
- Location within Rio de Janeiro

Jardim Oceânico / Barra da Tijuca is a station on the Rio de Janeiro Metro that services the neighborhood of Barra da Tijuca in the West Zone of Rio de Janeiro. It was previously simply named Jardim Oceânico, but was renamed alongside many others in August 2022 to include its neighborhood, Barra da Tijuca, in the name.

The station is Line 4's terminus, though it is integrated with the BRT's Terminal Jardim Oceânico through exit C, facilitating access to the TransOeste BRT line.

== Passenger traffic ==
Historical passenger traffic
Year	Passengers	±%
2016	2,797,793	—
2017	10,780,098	+285.3%
2018	13,171,171	+22.2%
2019	16,112,817	+22.3%
2020	6,877,099	−57.3%
2021	6,873,052	−0.1%
Note: This table displays the total number of passengers reportedly transported in the station in a given year. Source: Rio de Janeiro Municipal Government.

== Nearby locations ==
- Barra Point mall
- Downtown open mall
- Barra da Tijuca beach
