= Uruguai Station =

Metro station in Rio de Janeiro, Brazil

Uruguai / Tijuca
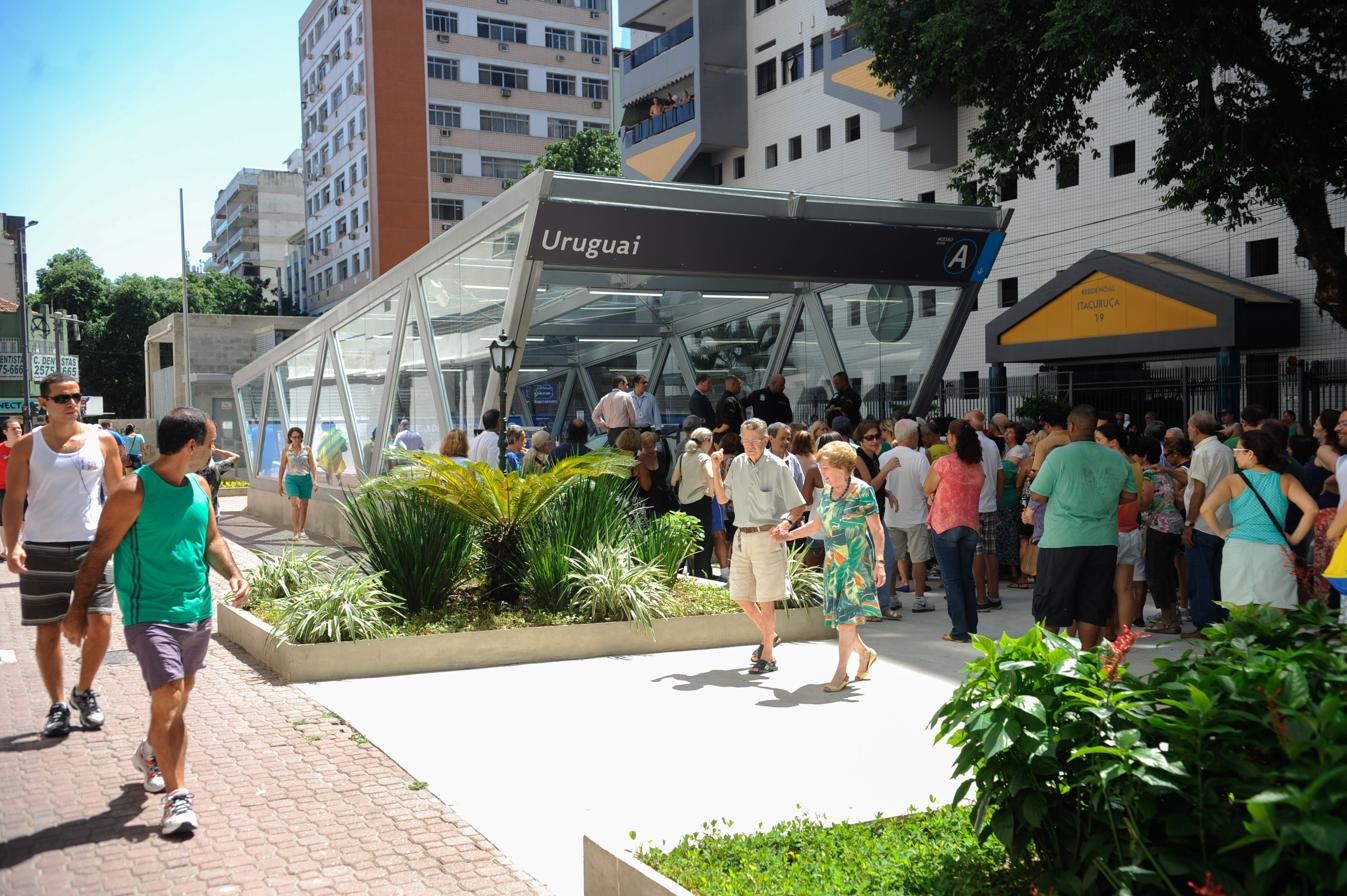
- Opening day of Uruguai Station in March 2014

General information
- Location: Rua Conde de Bonfim, 743; Tijuca, Rio de Janeiro; Brazil
- Coordinates: 22.9325°S 43.238611°W
- Operator: Metrô Rio
- Line: Line 1
- Platforms: 1
- Tracks: 2

Construction
- Cycle facilities: Yes
- Accessible: Yes

History
- Opened: March 15, 2014; 12 years ago
- Former names: Uruguai

Services
Preceding station	Rio de Janeiro Metro	Following station
Terminus	Line 1	Saens Peña towards General Osório
Location
- Location within Rio de Janeiro

Uruguai / Tijuca is a station on the Rio de Janeiro Metro that services the neighborhood of Tijuca in the North Zone of Rio de Janeiro.

The station was inaugurated on 15 March 2014, more than 30 years after initially being promised. It was previously simply named Uruguai, but was renamed alongside many others in August 2022 to include its neighborhood, Tijuca, in the name. Uruguai was the first metro station in Rio de Janeiro to be fitted with Wi-Fi for passenger use.

== Passenger traffic ==
Historical passenger traffic
Year	Passengers	±%
2014	5,437,874	—
2015	7,297,128	+34.2%
2016	7,759,343	+6.3%
2017	7,160,989	−7.7%
2018	6,995,146	−2.3%
2019	7,211,233	+3.1%
2020	2,973,707	−58.8%
2021	2,948,597	−0.8%
Note: This table displays the total number of passengers reportedly transported in the station in a given year. Source: Rio de Janeiro Municipal Government.
