= General Osório Station =

Metro station in Rio de Janeiro, Brazil

General Osório / Ipanema
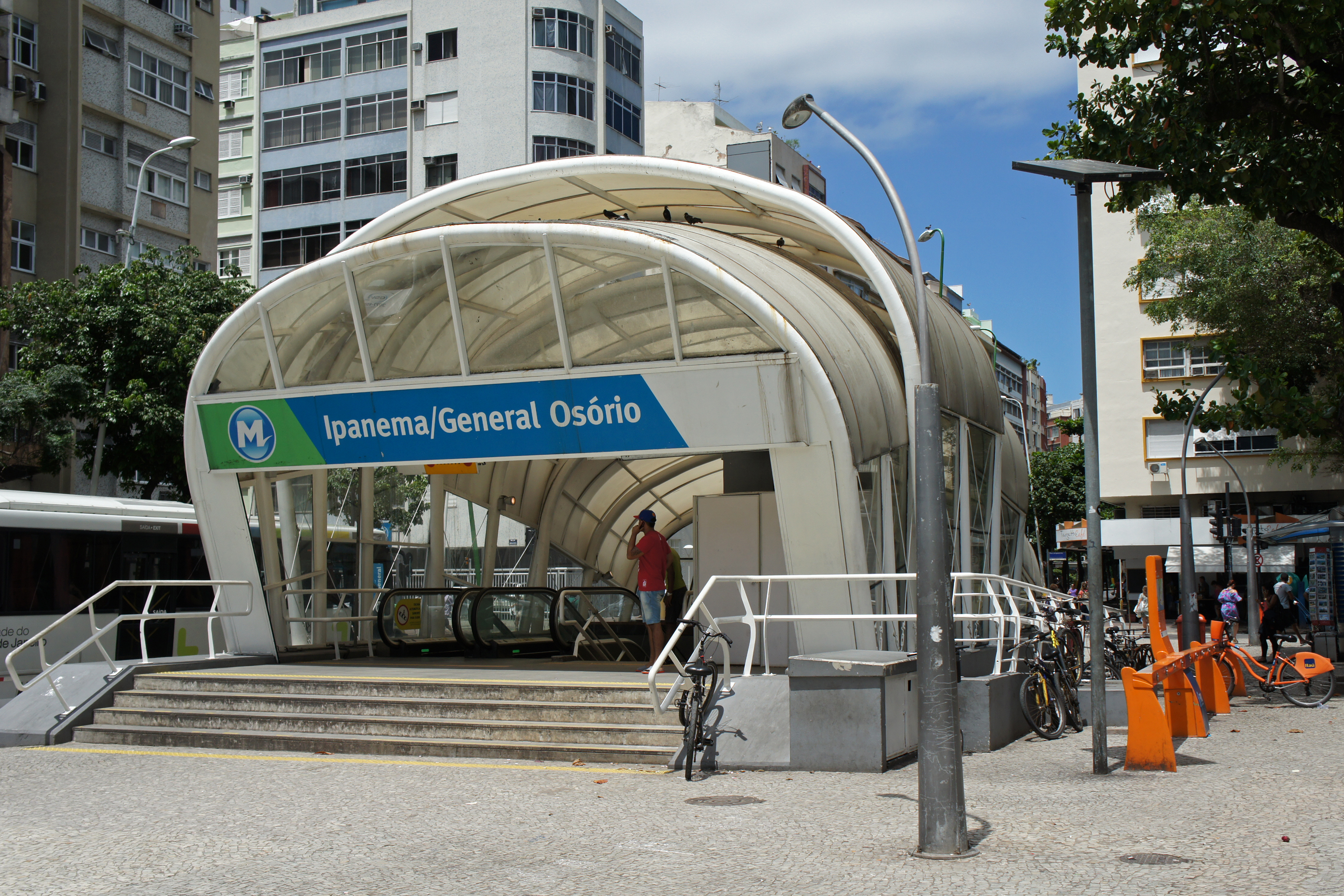

General information
- Location: Praça General Osório, Rio de Janeiro; Brazil
- Coordinates: 22°59′05″S 43°11′50″W
- Platforms: 3
- Tracks: 2
- Connections: Metrô Rio Bus; Gávea (Metrô na Superfície); Barra Expresso

Construction
- Parking: No
- Cycle facilities: Yes
- Accessible: Yes

History
- Opened: December 2009; 16 years ago

Services
Preceding station	Rio de Janeiro Metro	Following station
Cantagalo towards Uruguai	Line 1	Terminus
Terminus	Line 4	Nossa Senhora da Paz towards Jardim Oceânico
Location
- Location within Rio de Janeiro

General Osório / Ipanema is a station on Line 1 of the Rio de Janeiro Metro located in the Ipanema borough of Rio de Janeiro, Brazil. It is the line's southern terminus. The station opened in December 2009.

== Station layout ==
The station has a layout unusual for Brazil with the two tracks located between three platforms. Internationally this is not uncommon and is referred to as the Spanish solution layout.

== Transfers ==
MetrôRio Bus Service runs the Metrô na Superfície bus to Gávea and the Barra Expresso between General Osório / Ipanema Station and Terminal Alvorada in Barra da Tijuca.

Inside of the station.

== Passenger traffic ==
Historical passenger traffic

Year	Passengers	±%
2009	139,639	—
2010	8,950,679	+6309.9%
2011	10,169,059	+13.6%
2012	10,819,513	+6.4%
2013	2,082,358	−80.8%
2014	11,285,181	+441.9%
2015	12,192,476	+8.0%

Year	Passengers	±%
2016	12,816,639	+5.1%
2017	7,214,042	−43.7%
2018	6,347,745	−12.0%
2019	6,347,805	+0.0%
2020	2,970,494	−53.2%
2021	2,928,042	−1.4%

Note: This table displays the total number of passengers reportedly transported in the station in a given year.
During part of 2013, the station was closed for work on integration with Line 4; in 2016, Line 4 was inaugurated. These factors serve to explain the sudden dips in traffic.
Source: Rio de Janeiro Municipal Government.

== Nearby locations ==
- General Osório Square
- Nossa Senhora da Paz Square
- Lagoa Rodrigo de Freitas
- Copacabana Beach
- Beach of Ipanema
