= Line 1 (Rio de Janeiro) =

Metro line in Rio de Janeiro

Rio de Janeiro Metro Line 1 (Orange)

Overview
- Status: Operational
- Owner: Government of the State of Rio de Janeiro
- Locale: Rio de Janeiro, Brazil
- Termini: General Osório; Uruguai
- Stations: 20

Service
- Type: Rapid transit
- System: Rio de Janeiro Metro
- Operator(s): MetrôRio

History
- Opened: 5 March 1979; 47 years ago
- Last extension: 2009

Technical
- Line length: 20.2 km (12.6 mi)
- Track gauge: 1,600 mm (5 ft 3 in)
- Electrification: 750 V DC third rail
- Operating speed: 80 km/h (50 mph)

Line 1 (Orange) of the Rio de Janeiro Metro serves the city's downtown business centre, the tourist areas in the city's South Zone, and several neighbourhoods in the North Zone. It is a semi-circular line, and is fully underground. It runs from Uruguai to General Osório.

It is the original line of the Rio de Janeiro Metro system and it was constructed from June 1970 to March 1979 (with a hiatus between 1971 and 1974 due to lack of funds).

== History of Line 1 ==
In 1979, the line began operations with 5 stations: Praça Onze, Central, Presidente Vargas, Cinelandia, and Gloria. In 1980, the stations Estácio and Uruguaiana were added. The following year (in 1981), the Botafogo, Flamengo, and Largo do Machado stations opened. In 1982, the line was extended to Saens Peña with the São Francisco Xavier and Afonso Pena stations added. In 1998, the Cardeal Arcoverde station opened in Copacabana. The Siqueira Campos station opened in 2002, while the Cantagalo Station opened in 2007.

== Accessibility issues ==
Inaccessibility for disabled persons on Line 1 has come under scrutiny in recent years. When the line opened in 1979, there was no appropriate legislation to mandate accessibility and therefore not built to current access standards.
