= Engenheiro Rubens Paiva Station =

Metro station in Rio de Janeiro, Brazil

Engenheiro Rubens Paiva
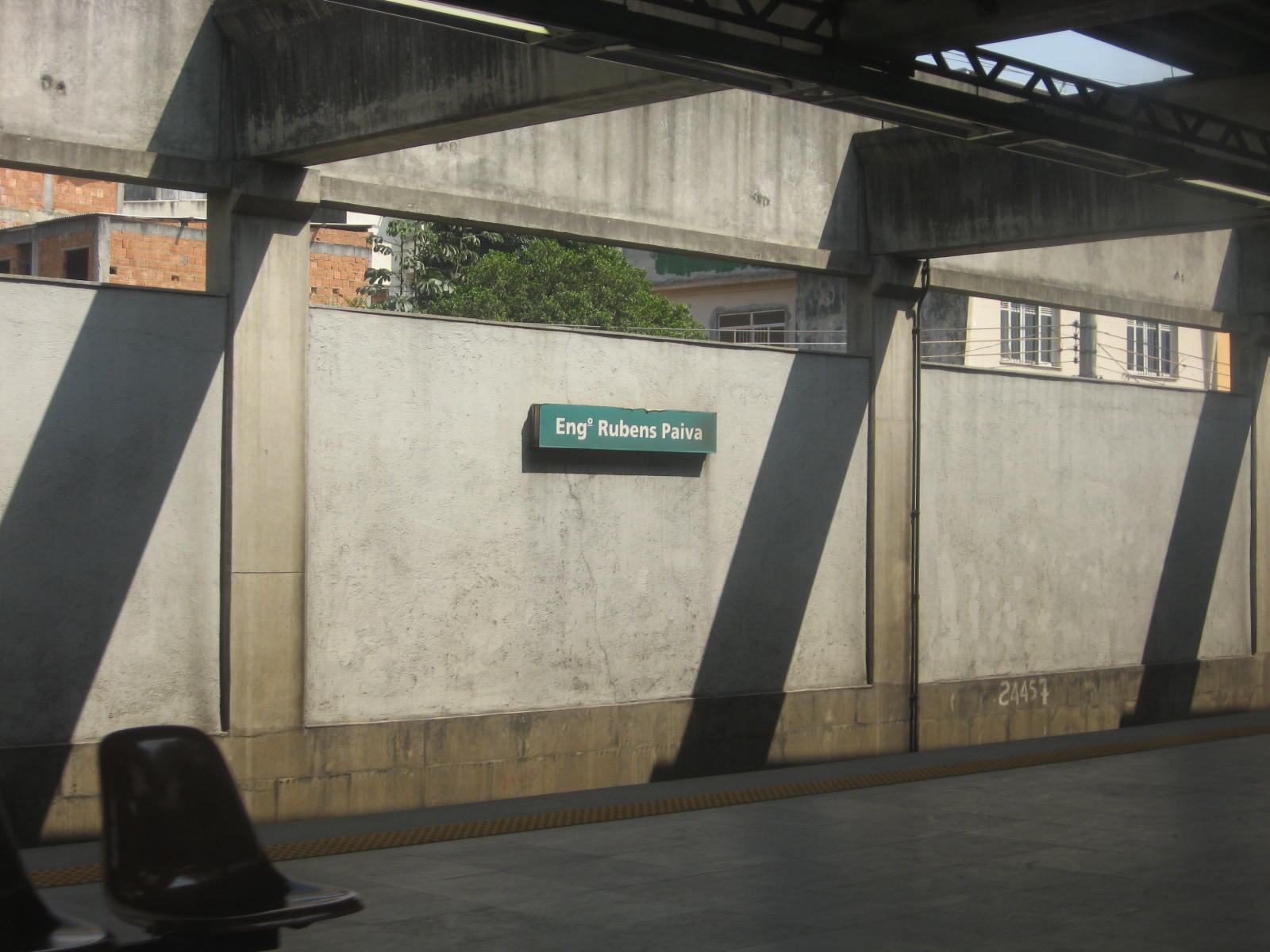
- Platform at Engenheiro Rubens Paiva Station

General information
- Location: Avenida Pastor Martin Luther King Jr; Pavuna, Rio de Janeiro; Brazil
- Coordinates: 22.816284°S 43.358484°W
- Operator: Metrô Rio
- Line: Line 2

Other information
- Station code: ERP

History
- Opened: 1998; 28 years ago

Services
| Preceding station | Rio de Janeiro Metro | Following station |
|---|---|---|
| Pavuna Terminus | Line 2 | Acari/Fazenda Botafogo towards Botafogo |
Location
- Location within Rio de Janeiro

Engenheiro Rubens Paiva Station (Portuguese: Estação Engenheiro Rubens Paiva) is a subway station on the Rio de Janeiro Metro that services the neighbourhood of Pavuna in the North Zone of Rio de Janeiro. The station was named after the Brazilian civil engineer and politician Rubens Paiva.
