= Glória Station =

Metro station in Rio de Janeiro, Brazil

Glória
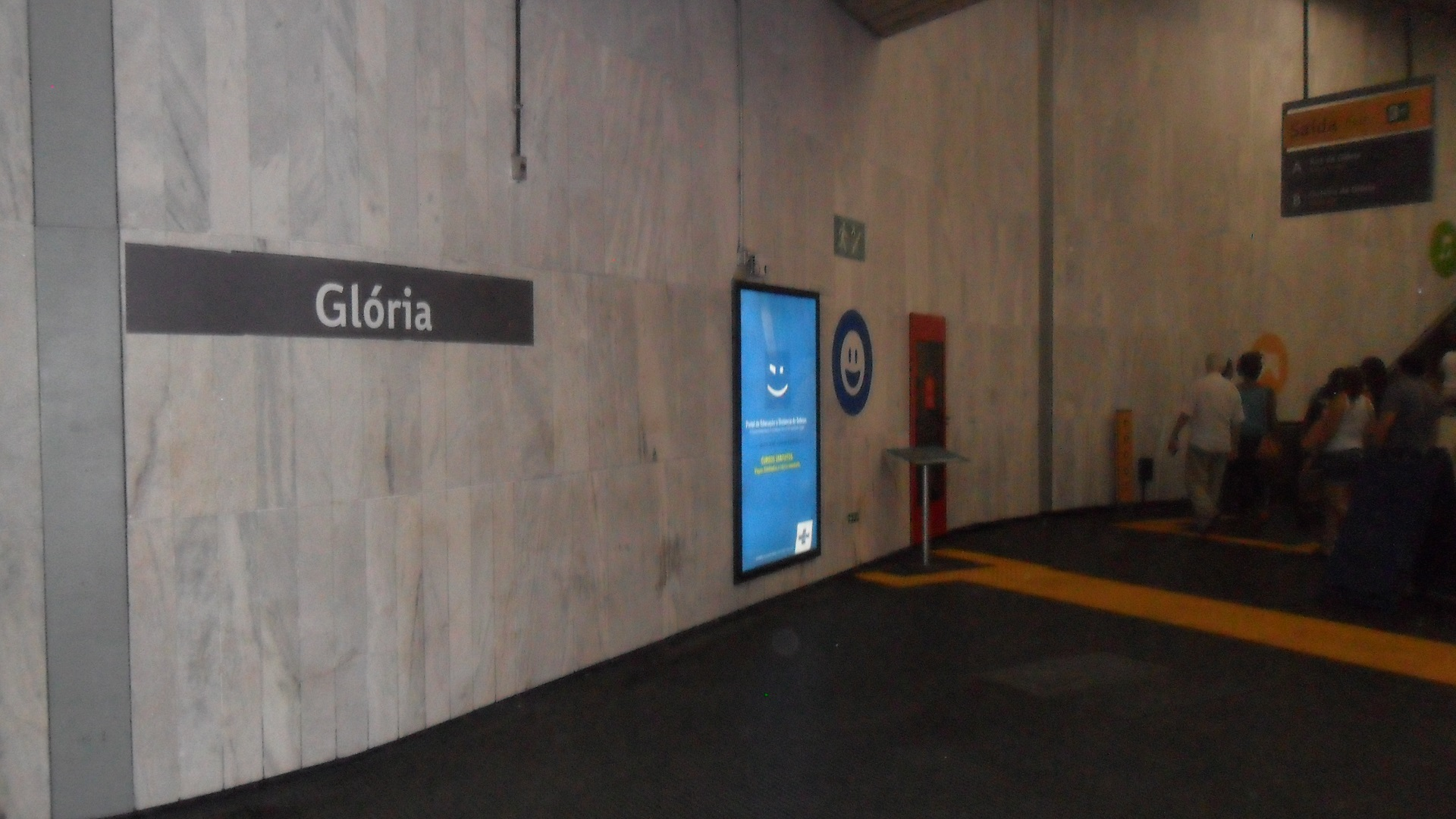
- Estação Glória

General information
- Location: Rua da Glória; Centro, Rio de Janeiro; Brazil
- Coordinates: 22.920517°S 43.176664°W
- Operator: Metrô Rio
- Lines: Line 1 Line 2

Other information
- Station code: GLR

History
- Opened: 1979; 47 years ago

Services
Preceding station	Rio de Janeiro Metro	Following station
Cinelândia towards Uruguai	Line 1	Catete towards General Osório
Cinelândia towards Pavuna	Line 2	Catete towards Botafogo
Location
- Location within Rio de Janeiro

Glória Station (Portuguese: Estação Glória) is a subway station on the Rio de Janeiro Metro that services downtown Rio de Janeiro.
