= Cinelândia Station =

Subway station in central Rio de Janeiro, Brazil

Cinelândia
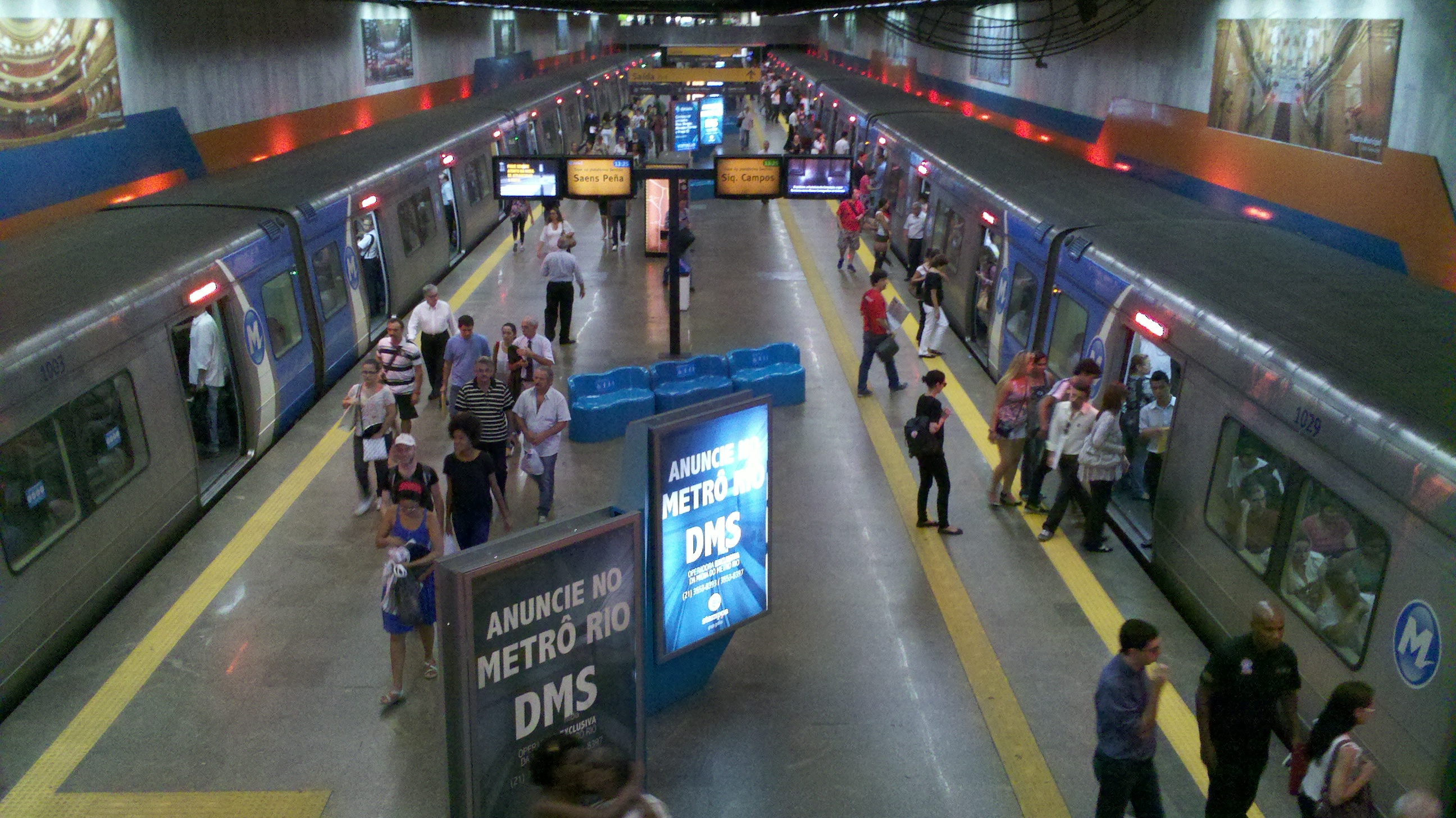
- View of platforms at Cinelândia

General information
- Location: Avenida Rio Branco; Centro, Rio de Janeiro; Brazil
- Coordinates: 22.910889°S 43.175772°W
- Operator: Metrô Rio
- Lines: Line 1 Line 2

Construction
- Structure type: Underground

Other information
- Station code: CNL

History
- Opened: 1979; 47 years ago

Services
Preceding station	Rio de Janeiro Metro	Following station
Carioca towards Uruguai	Line 1	Glória towards General Osório
Carioca towards Pavuna	Line 2	Glória towards Botafogo
Location
- Location within Rio de Janeiro

Cinelândia Station (Portuguese: Estação Cinelândia) is a station on the Rio de Janeiro Metro that services the Praça Marechal Floriano (commonly known as Cinelândia) public square in the Centro neighborhood of Rio de Janeiro, Brazil.

In 1979, the Cinelândia station was opened as one of the first five stations of the then-new metro network.

The metro station is located on the site of the former Monroe Palace, which served as home to the Brazilian Congress from 1914 to 1920, and later as home to the Brazilian Senate from the 1925 to 1960. This palace was demolished in 1976 on the order of Brazilian president Ernesto Geisel, ostensibly in order to build the metro station.
