= Thomaz Coelho Station =

Metro station in Rio de Janeiro, Brazil

Thomaz Coelho
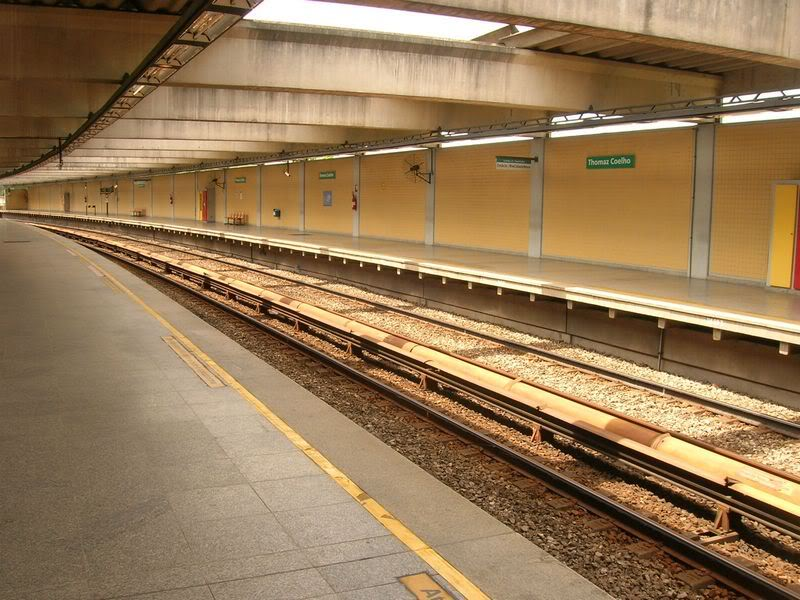

General information
- Location: Avenida Pastor Martin Luther King Jr; Tomás Coelho, Rio de Janeiro; Brazil
- Coordinates: 22.86261°S 43.3067979°W
- Operator: Metrô Rio
- Line: Line 2

Construction
- Accessible: yes

Other information
- Station code: TCL

History
- Opened: 1996; 30 years ago

Services
Preceding station	Rio de Janeiro Metro	Following station
Vicente de Carvalho towards Pavuna	Line 2	Engenho da Rainha towards Botafogo
Location
- Location within Rio de Janeiro

Thomaz Coelho Station (Portuguese: Estação Thomaz Coelho) is a subway station on the Rio de Janeiro Metro that services the Rio de Janeiro neighbourhood of Tomás Coelho.
