= Flamengo, Rio de Janeiro =

Flamengo
- Neighborhood
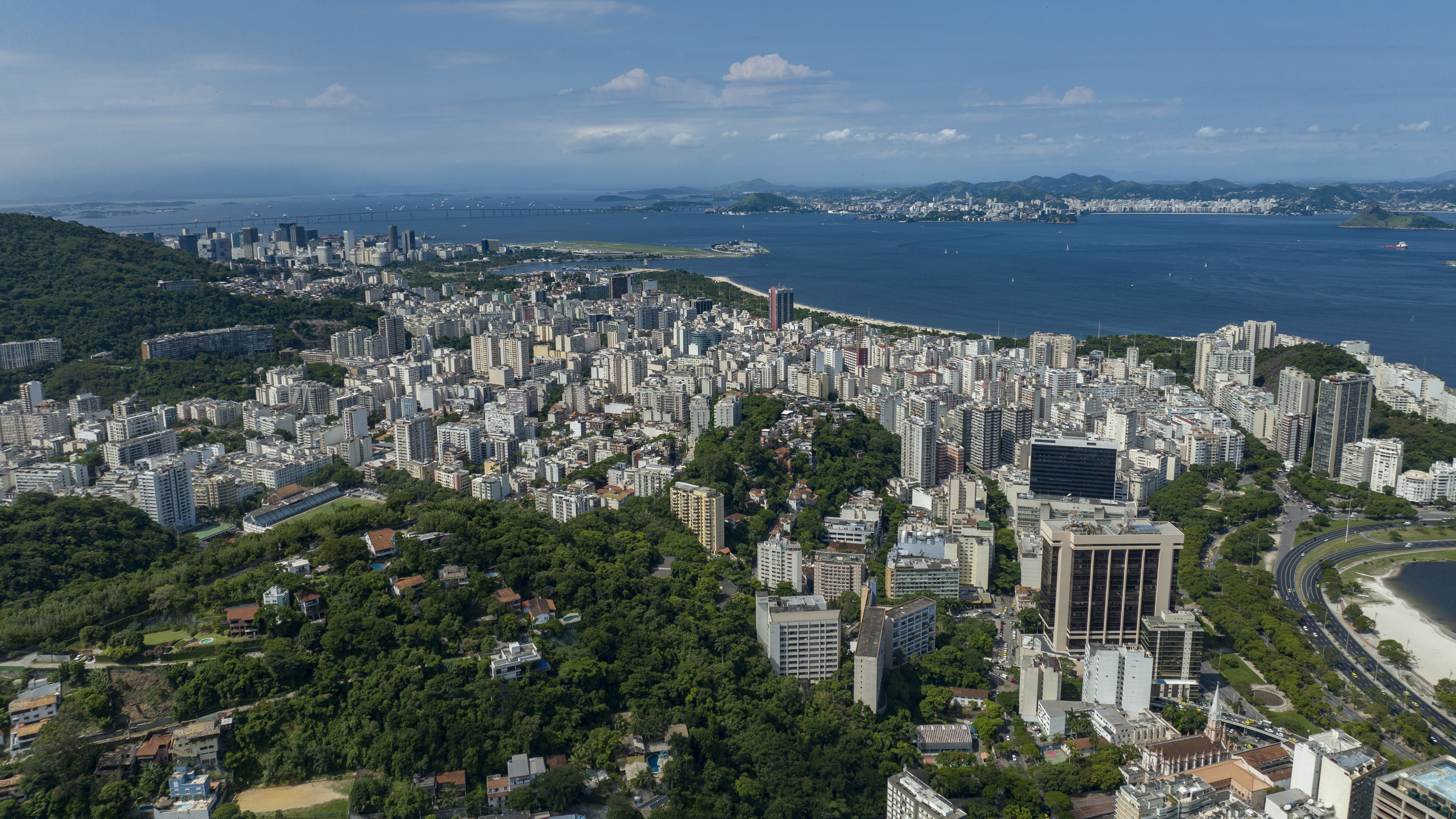

- Location in Rio de Janeiro Flamengo (Brazil)
- Coordinates: 22°56′01″S 43°10′28″W
- Country: Brazil
- State: Rio de Janeiro (RJ)
- Municipality/City: Rio de Janeiro
- Zone: South Zone

Population (2010)
  - Total: 50,043

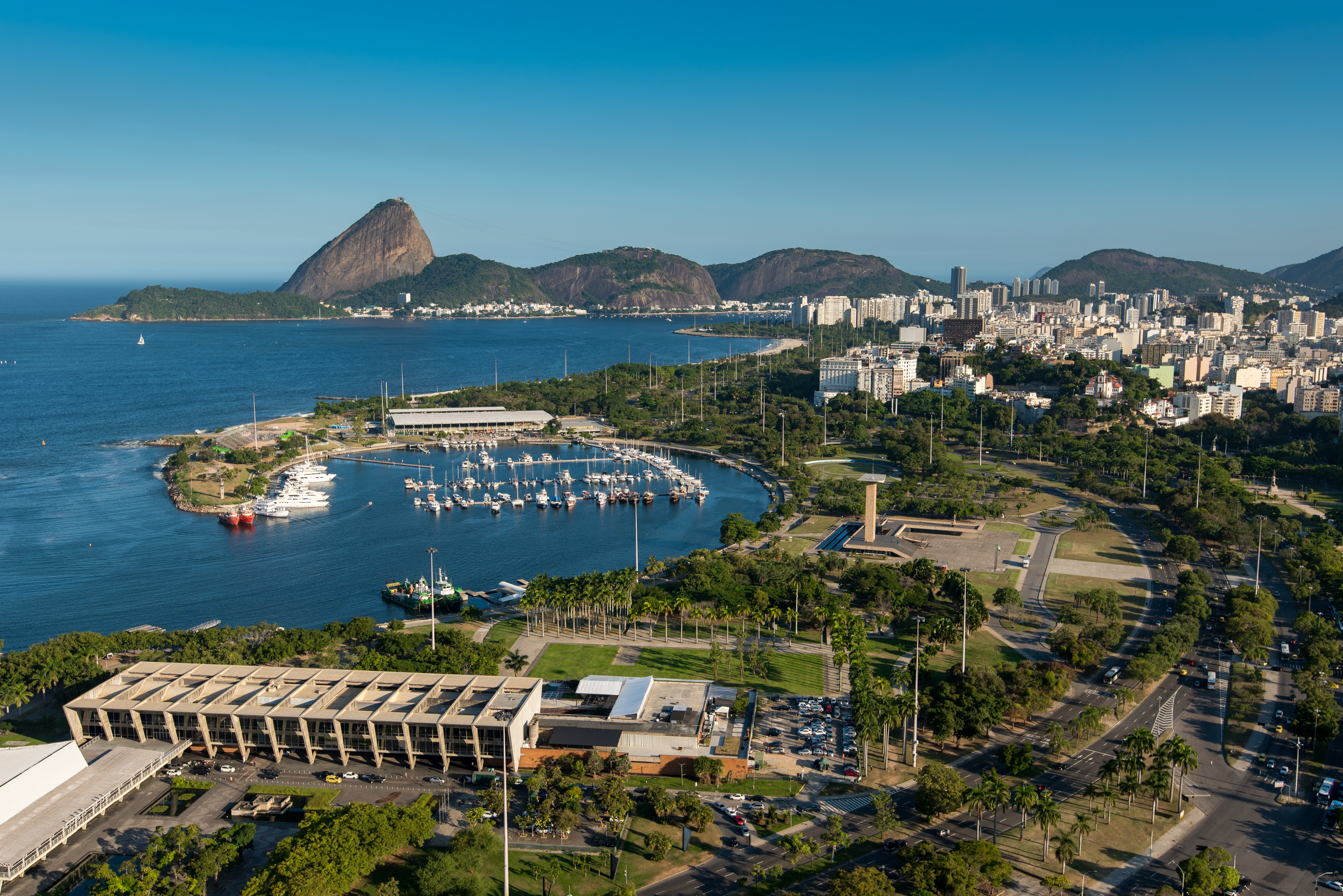
Flamengo Park and Marina da Glória.

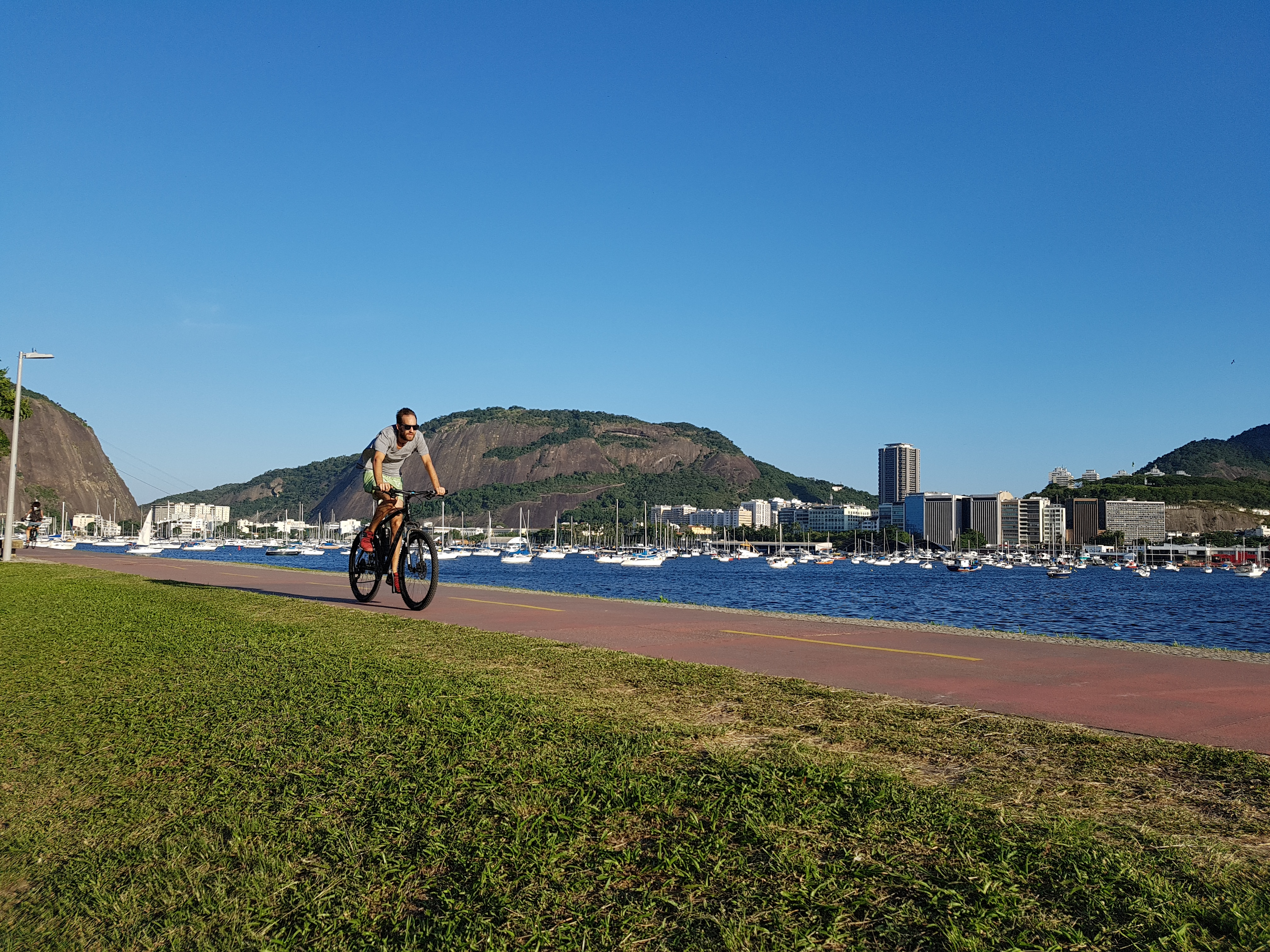
Aterro do Flamengo.

Flamengo is a neighborhood in Rio de Janeiro, Brazil.

== History ==
The name of the neighborhood comes from the nearby beach, Praia do Flamengo ("Beach of the Flemming"), so named because it was the place from where the Dutch sailor Olivier van Noort tried to invade the city in 1599. At that time, Dutchmen were called "Flemmings" by the Portuguese, regardless of whether they actually hailed from Flanders or not.

== Characteristics ==
It is located between Catete and Botafogo districts on the edge of Guanabara Bay. The beachfront area is dominated by the Brigadier Eduardo Gomes Park, also known as Aterro do Flamengo, built by Lota de Macedo Soares on nearly 300 acres (1.2 km²) of land reclaimed from the bay and completed in 1965. The park features gardens designed by well-known Brazilian landscape designer Roberto Burle Marx.

The district and surroundings are serviced by three subway stations: Flamengo, Largo do Machado and Catete, and many bus lines that link it to the rest of the city. It is fairly close to the city centre and offers excellent views of Pão de Açúcar (Sugarloaf Mountain) and the statue of Christ the Redeemer. Nowadays, it is mostly a middle-class residential neighborhood.

Its main streets are Senador Vergueiro, Marquês de Abrantes and Praia do Flamengo.

=== Destinations ===
- Carmen Miranda Museum
- Flamengo Park—Parque Brigadeiro Eduardo Gomes
- Marina da Glória
- Monument to the Dead of World War II
- Museum of Modern Art, Rio de Janeiro

== Notable residents ==
- Zózimo Bulbul, actor and filmmaker
