= Cinelândia =

Public square in central Rio de Janeiro, Brazil

Coordinates: 22°54′39.63″S 43°10′32.61″W

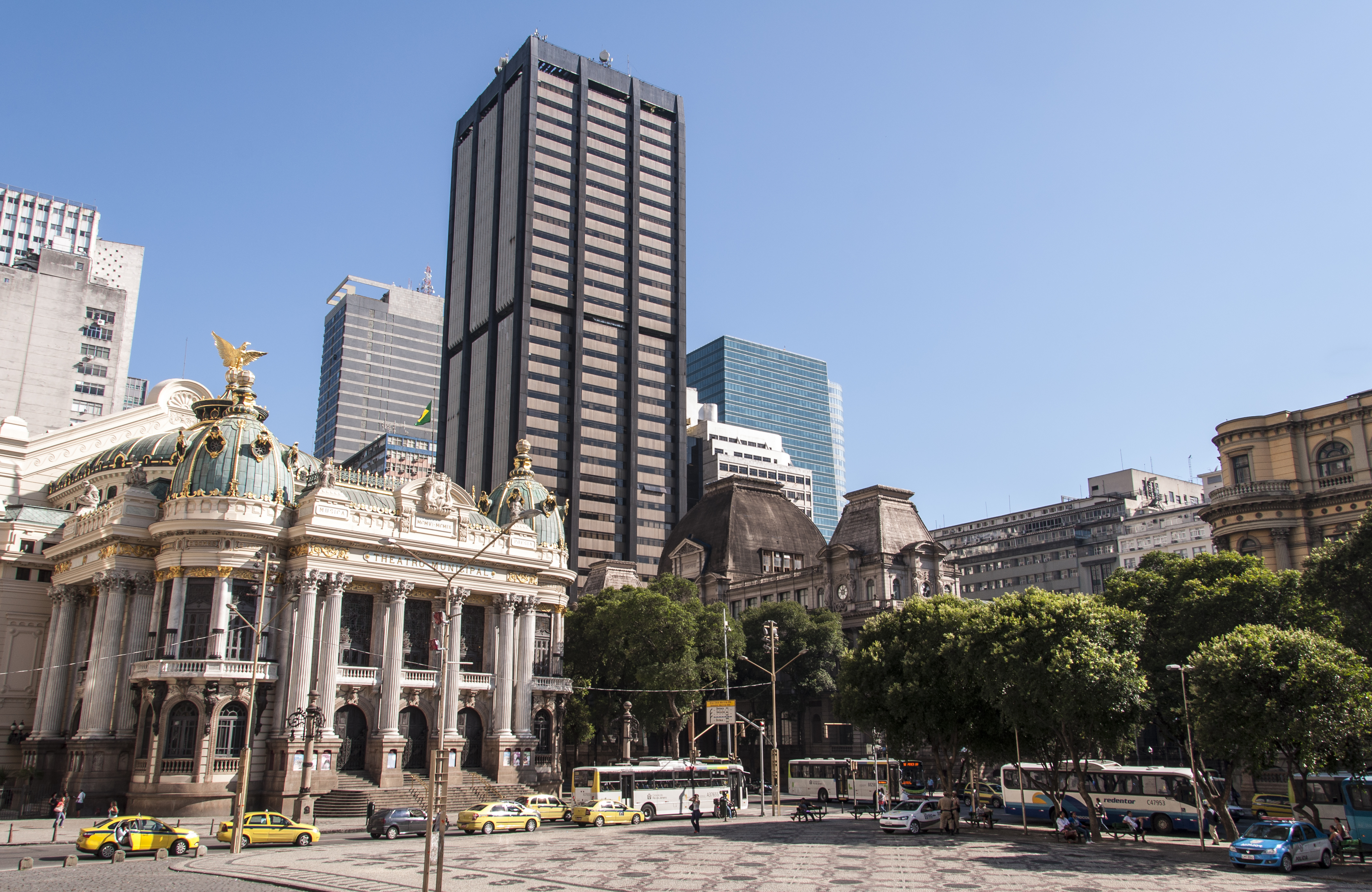
View of Cinelândia Square.

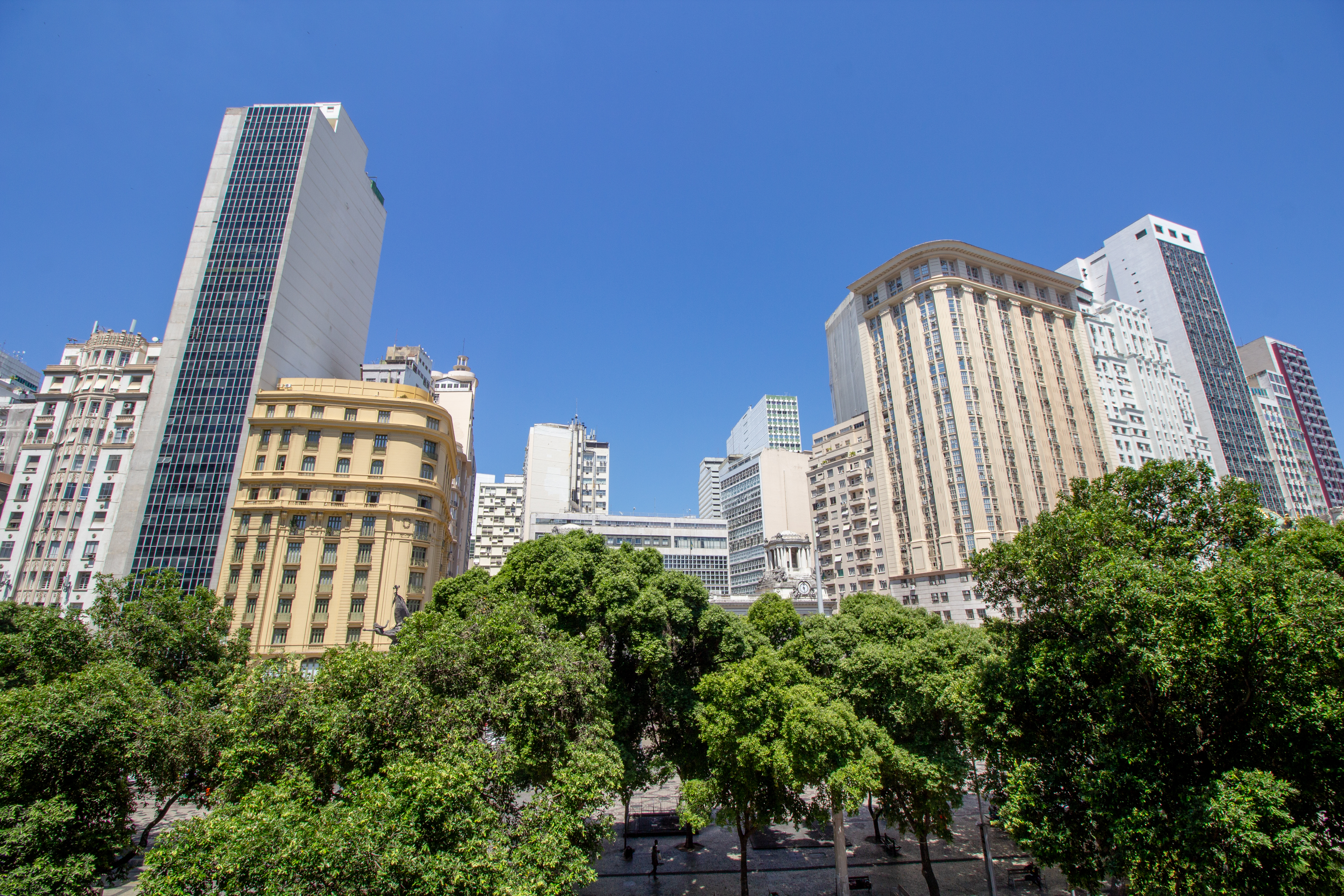
Buildings at Cinelândia.

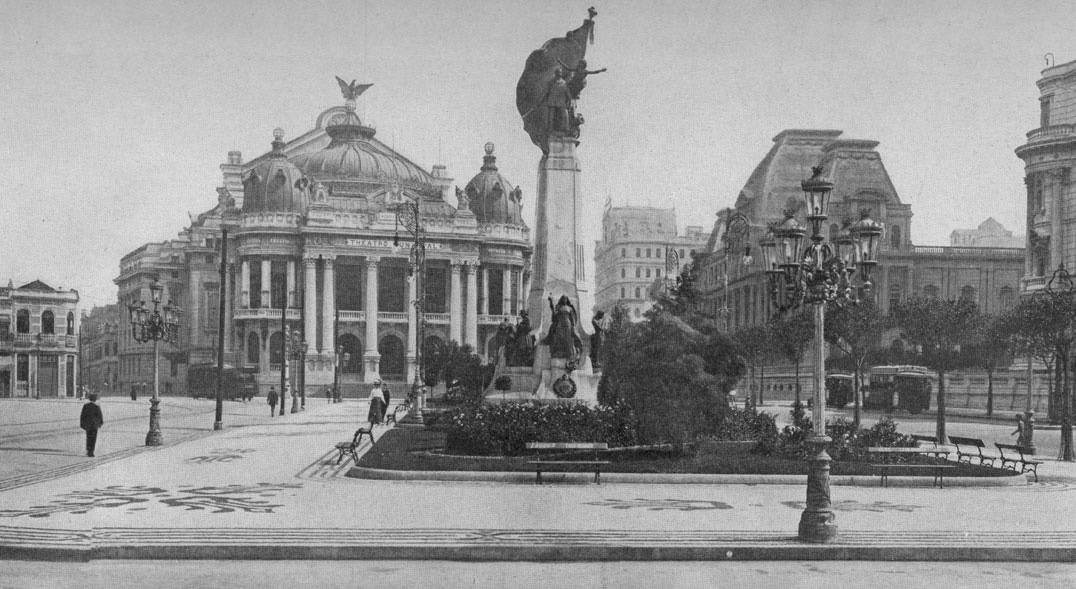
View of Cinelândia square in 1919. The monument to Floriano Peixoto is in the foreground. The Municipal Theatre is at the background left.

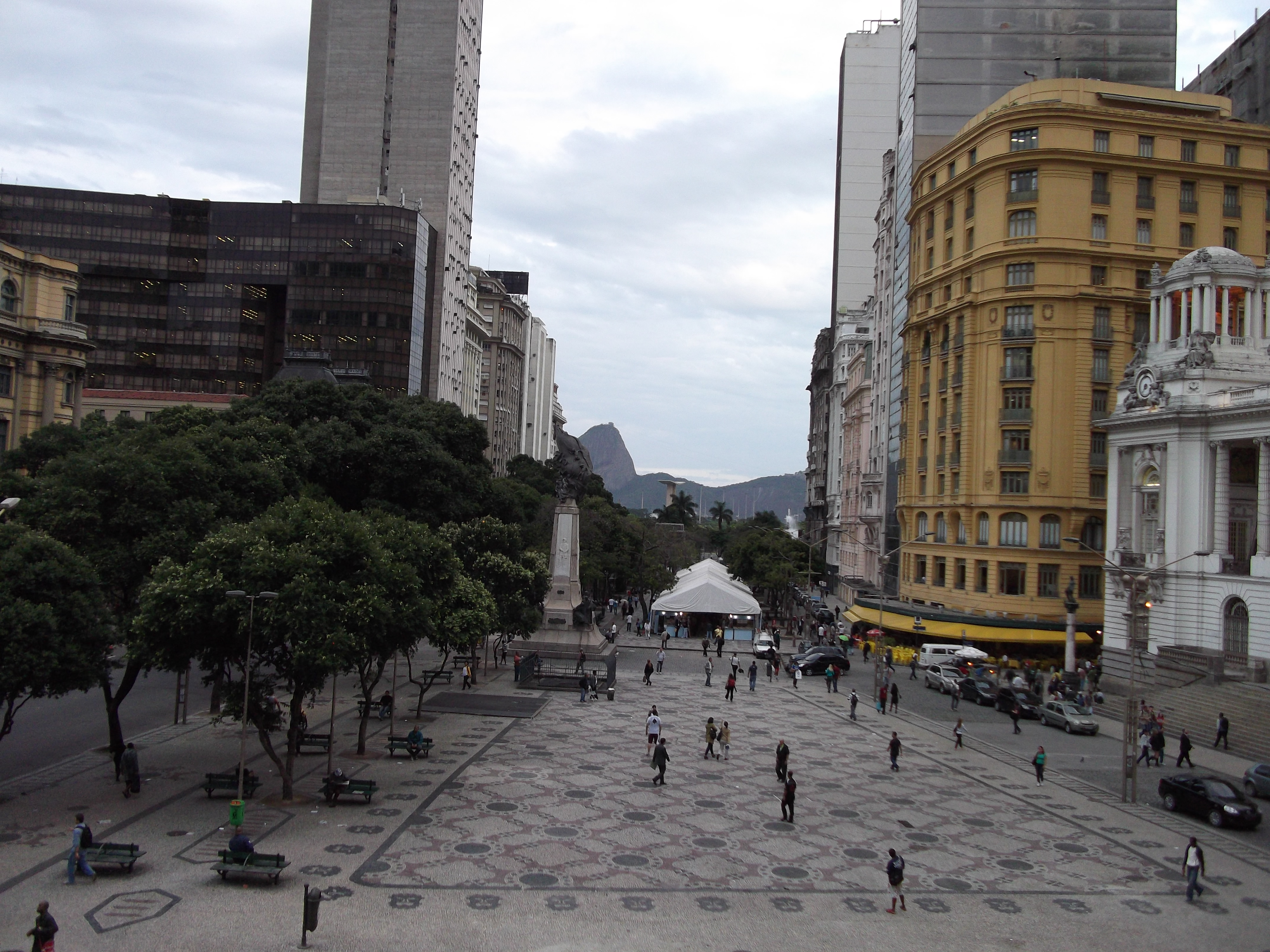
View of Cinelândia square towards Guanabara bay and the Sugar Loaf.

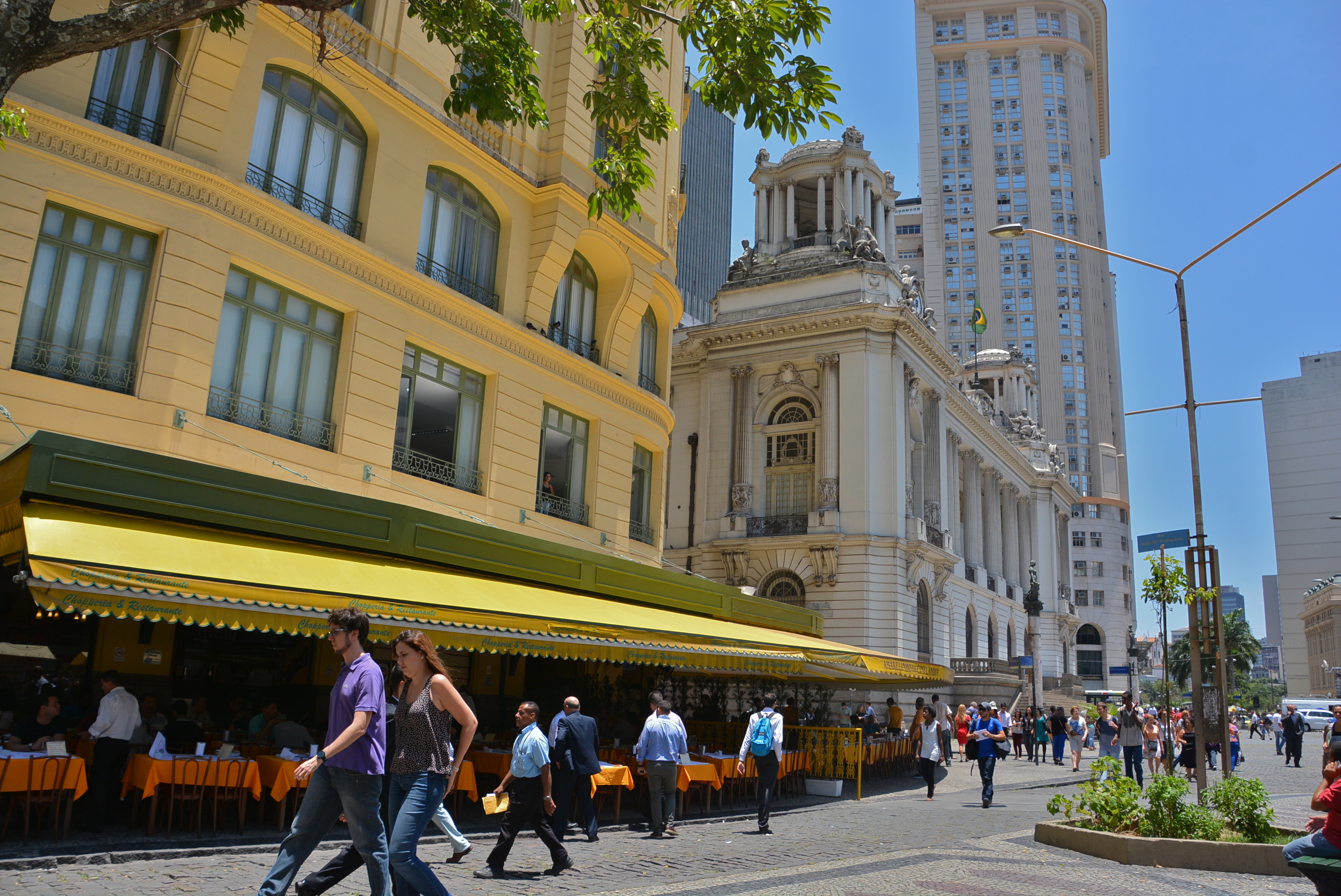
Cinelândia.

Cinelândia is the popular name of a major public square in the centre of Rio de Janeiro, Brazil. Its official name is Praça Floriano Peixoto, in honour of the second president of Brazil, Floriano Peixoto.

== History ==
In colonial times, the main structure in the Cinelândia area was the Ajuda Convent, built for women in 1750. Today's square started to gain its current shape in the early 20th century, when the Brazilian government considered that Rio de Janeiro, then the capital of the Republic, needed to be completely overhauled.

Beginning in 1904, the city centre was remodeled following the latest trends in hygiene and urbanism under the direction of mayor Francisco Pereira Passos, with particular inspiration from Haussmann's renovation of Paris. The centrepiece of the reform was a large boulevard – the Avenida Central, (later renamed Avenida Rio Branco) - which was built crossing the old city centre, passing by the Ajuda Convent. Most of the cortiços in central Rio were demolished, which helped fuel the growth of early favelas. The area in front of the Ajuda Convent was turned into a public square.

During the early decades of the 20th century a series of monumental public buildings were built facing the square. These were the Municipal Theatre, the Brazilian National Library, the Municipal Chamber of Rio de Janeiro (Pedro Ernesto Palace), the National Museum of Fine Arts, the Supreme Federal Court (which had its old building converted into the Federal Judiciary Cultural Centre after the capital of Brazil was moved to Brasília in 1960) and the Federal Senate, which had its former building controversially demolished in 1976. The square concentrated a great part of the political and cultural life of Brazil. The buildings surrounding the square, mostly following the French Beaux-Arts architectural style, were a symbol of the modernisation of the city.

In the centre of the square, a monument to Marshal Floriano Peixoto, second president of the Republic, was erected in 1910. The bronze monument, designed by sculptor Eduardo Sá and cast in France, depicts scenes of important events in Brazilian history. Another bronze statue, inaugurated in front of the Municipal Theatre, pays homage to Carlos Gomes, Brazil's foremost 19th century composer.

In 1979 a Rio de Janeiro Metro station was opened in the square. Cinelândia Station was one of the first five stations in the then-new network. A Rio de Janeiro Light Rail station was opened in 2016. At the same time, the section of Avenida Rio Branco that passes by Cinelândia was pedestrianized.

=== Cinemas ===
The old Ajuda Convent survived the initial remodeling of the square, but was finally demolished in 1911. In its place, Spanish entrepreneur Francisco Serrador built a series of tall buildings that concentrated the best cinemas of the city. It was due to these theatres that the area became popularly known as Cinelândia ("Cinema land").

Most of the cinemas are now closed, but the region around Cinelândia is still a lively spot in Rio thanks to its bars, restaurants and cultural attractions.

== See also ==
- Theatro Municipal (Rio de Janeiro)
- Fundação Biblioteca Nacional
- Museu Nacional de Belas Artes
