= Largo do Machado Station =

Metro station in Rio de Janeiro, Brazil

Largo do Machado
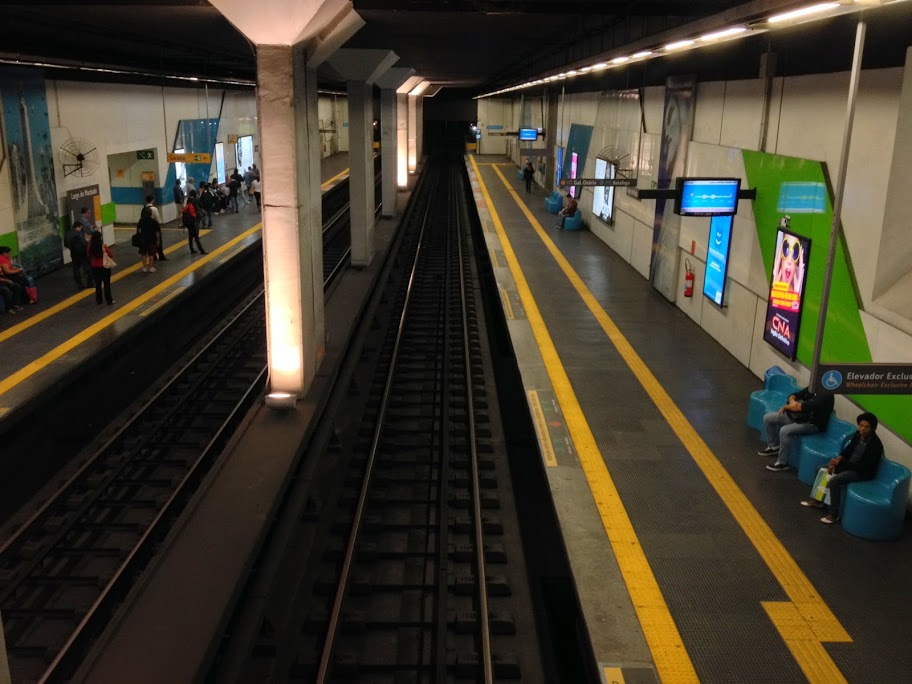

General information
- Location: Largo do Machado, 11; Catete, Rio de Janeiro; Brazil
- Coordinates: 22.930925°S 43.178286°W
- Operator: Metrô Rio
- Lines: Line 1 Line 2
- Connections: Integrated buses Expressa – 580 – Cosme Velha; Expressa – 133 – Rodoviária

Construction
- Structure type: Underground
- Accessible: yes

Other information
- Station code: LMC

History
- Opened: 1981; 45 years ago

Passengers
- 40,000 per day

Services
Preceding station	Rio de Janeiro Metro	Following station
Catete towards Uruguai	Line 1	Flamengo towards General Osório
Catete towards Pavuna	Line 2	Flamengo towards Botafogo
Location
- Location within Rio de Janeiro

Largo do Machado Station (Portuguese: Estação Largo do Machado) is an underground station on the Rio de Janeiro Metro that services the neighbourhoods of Catete, Laranjeiras, Cosme Velho and Largo do Machado in the South Zone of Rio de Janeiro. It is located near the Estádio das Laranjeiras.
