= Flamengo Station =

Metro station in Rio de Janeiro, Brazil

Flamengo
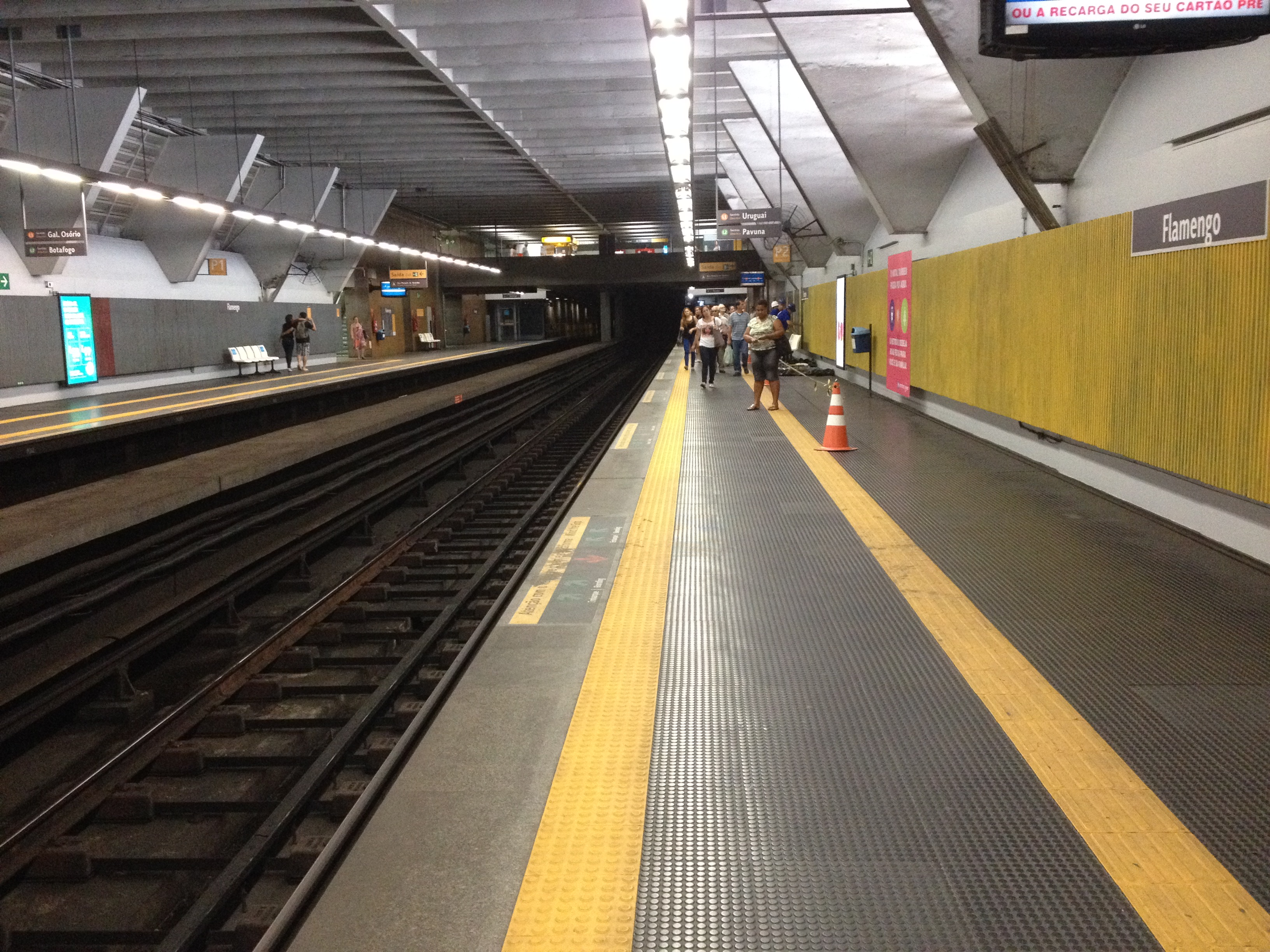
- Flamengo Station in 2014

General information
- Location: Flamengo, Rio de Janeiro; Brazil
- Coordinates: 22.9378099°S 43.1781503°W
- Operator: Metrô Rio
- Lines: Line 1 Line 2

Construction
- Accessible: yes

Other information
- Station code: FLA

History
- Opened: 1981; 45 years ago

Services
Preceding station	Rio de Janeiro Metro	Following station
Largo do Machado towards Uruguai	Line 1	Botafogo/Coca-Cola towards General Osório
Largo do Machado towards Pavuna	Line 2	Botafogo/Coca-Cola towards Botafogo
Location
- Location within Rio de Janeiro

Flamengo Station (Portuguese: Estação Flamengo) is a subway station on the Rio de Janeiro Metro that services the neighbourhood of Flamengo in the South Zone of Rio de Janeiro.

The station was opened in 1981 and was originally known as Morro Azul.
