= Catete Station =

Metro station in Rio de Janeiro, Brazil

Catete
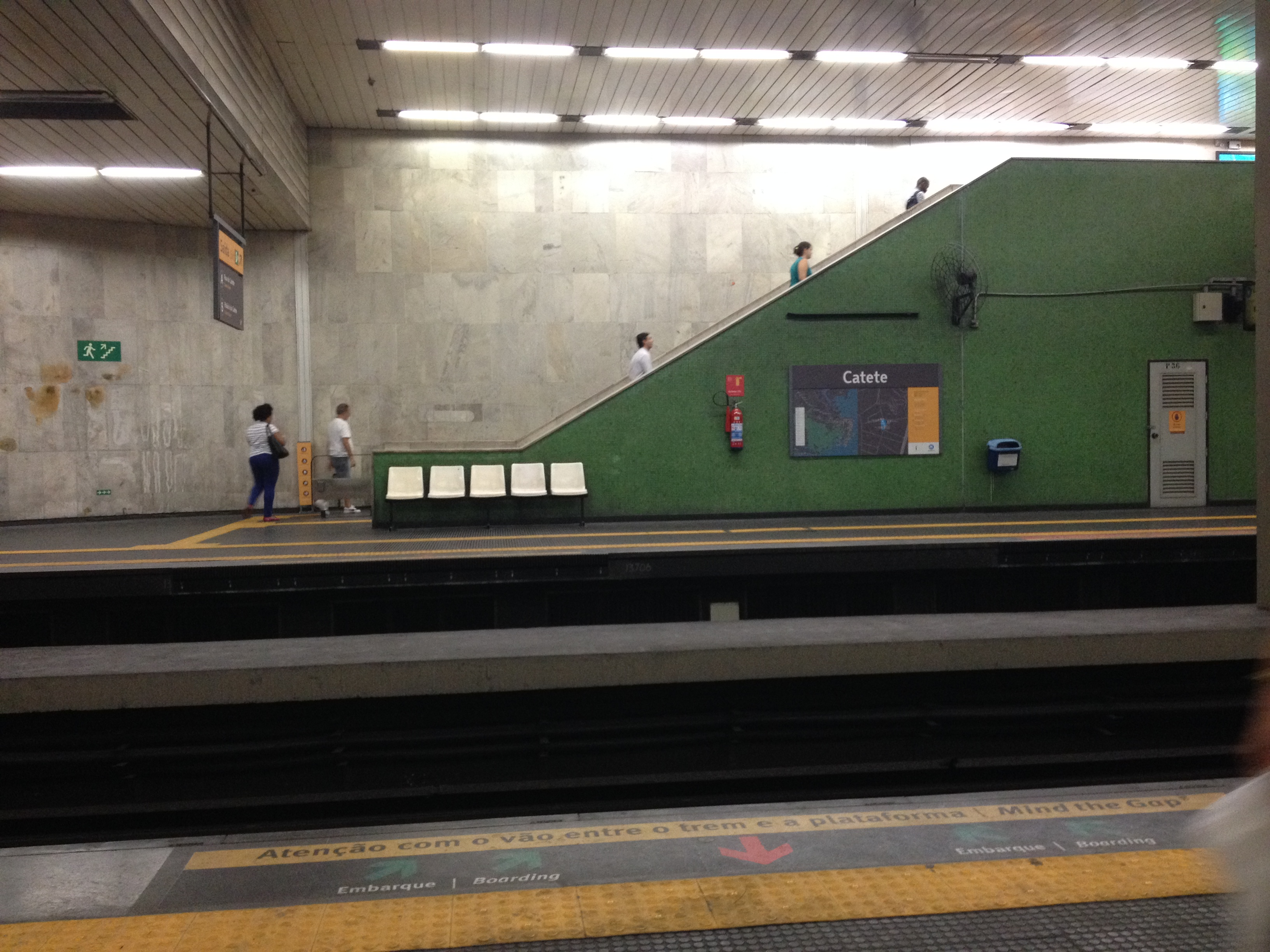

General information
- Location: Catete, Rio de Janeiro; Brazil
- Coordinates: 22.926183°S 43.176656°W
- Operator: Metrô Rio
- Lines: Line 1 Line 2

Other information
- Station code: CTT

History
- Opened: 1981; 45 years ago

Services
Preceding station	Rio de Janeiro Metro	Following station
Glória towards Uruguai	Line 1	Largo do Machado towards General Osório
Glória towards Pavuna	Line 2	Largo do Machado towards Botafogo
Location
- Location within Rio de Janeiro

Catete Station (Portuguese: Estação Catete) is a subway station on the Rio de Janeiro Metro that services the neighbourhood of Catete in the South Zone of Rio de Janeiro.
