= Tomás Coelho =

- Neighborhood
- Location in Rio de Janeiro Tomás Coelho (Brazil)
- Coordinates: 22°52′00″S 43°18′22″W
- Country: Brazil
- State: Rio de Janeiro (RJ)
- Municipality/City: Rio de Janeiro
- Zone: North Zone
- Administrative Region: Inhaúma

Population (2010)
  - Total: 22,676

Tomás Coelho is a neighborhood in the North Zone of Rio de Janeiro, Brazil.

The neighbourhood is home to the Thomaz Coelho Station on the Rio de Janeiro Metro and Thomaz Coelho Station on the SuperVia rail network.
