= Palácio Monroe =

Former monumental hall in Rio de Janeiro, Brazil (1906–76)

Monroe Palace
- Palácio Monroe
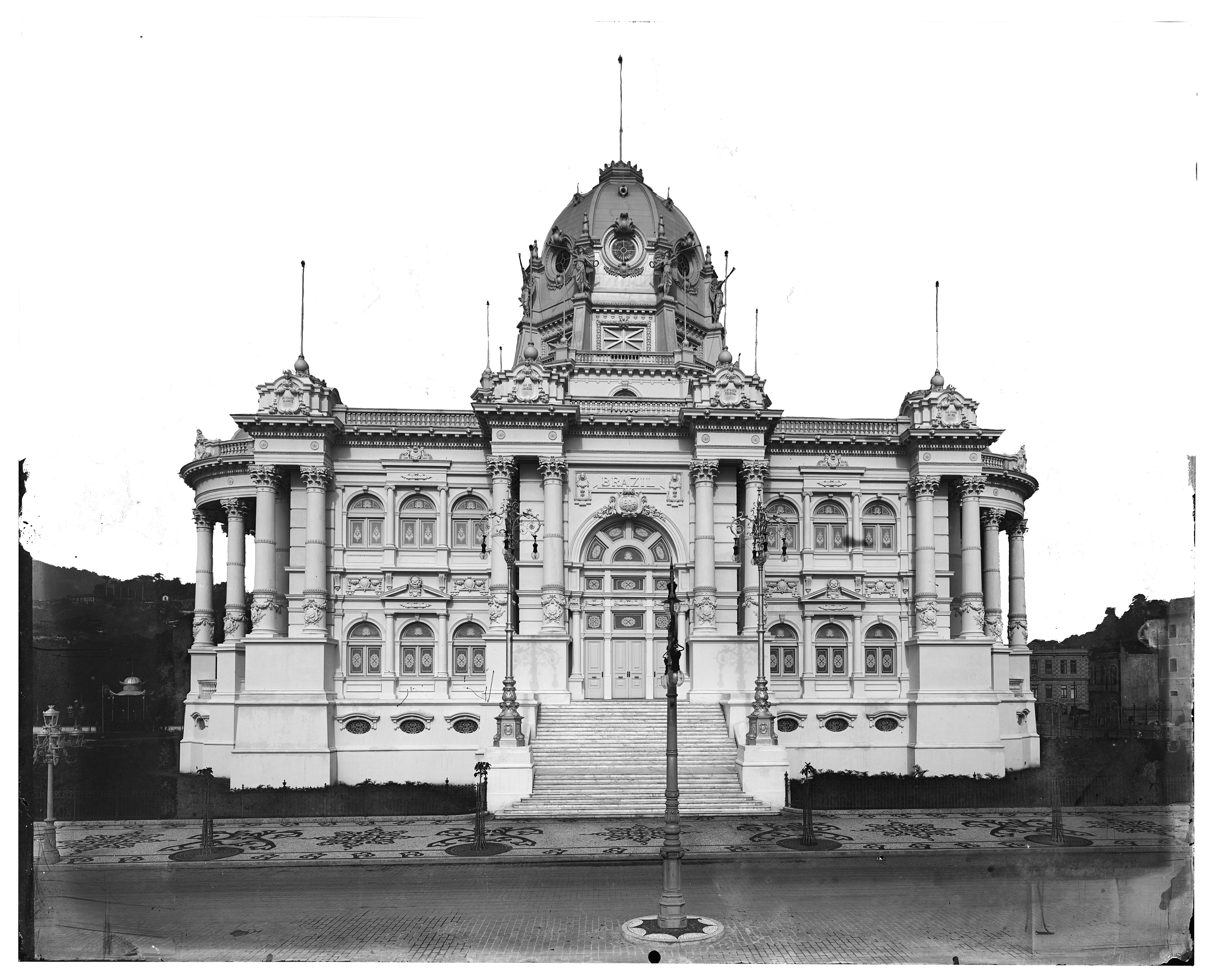
- Interactive map of the Monroe Palace area

General information
- Status: Demolished
- Type: Brazilian Congress seat (1914–1920); Brazilian Senate seat (1925–1960)
- Architectural style: Eclecticism
- Location: Praça Mahatma Gandhi, Rio de Janeiro, Brazil
- Coordinates: 22°54′44.82″S 43°10′31.62″W
- Inaugurated: 1906
- Demolished: March 1976
- Owner: Brazilian government

Technical details
- Floor area: 1,700 m^{2} (18,000 sq ft)

Design and construction
- Architect: Francisco Marcelino de Sousa Aguiar

Other information
- Public transit access: 1 2 Cinelândia; 1 3 Cinelândia

The Palácio Monroe was a monumental hall in the Centro neighborhood in Rio de Janeiro, Brazil. It was named in honor of U.S. president James Monroe. It was originally built in the U.S. city of St. Louis to act as the Brazilian Pavilion during the 1904 World's Fair. Following the World's Fair, the building was dismantled and transported in cargo ships to Rio de Janeiro, where it was rebuilt in 1906. Its grand opening at the 3rd Pan-American Conference was held on July 23, 1906. From 1914 to 1920, the palace was used as the home of the Brazilian Congress. From 1925 to 1960 it was used as the home of the Brazilian Senate.

In 1975, the architect and urban planner Lúcio Costa, who was the national chief of the National Institute of Historic and Artistic Heritage (Instituto do Patrimônio Histórico e Artístico Nacional – IPHAN), created a public controversy by refusing to sign the landmarking act of Palácio Monroe. The building was slated for demolition because of the construction of the Rio de Janeiro Metro, but in the face of public and media outcry, the construction company shifted the line to preserve the building. This effort, however, was in vain, because on October 11, 1975, the Brazilian president Ernesto Geisel authorized the building's demolition and a developer razed the building in March 1976. The decision was contrary to the State of Rio de Janeiro's decision declaring the building an Official Landmark in 1974. In 1979, the Cinelândia Station was opened as one of the first five stations of the then-new metro network, on the site of the demolished palace.

== Gallery ==
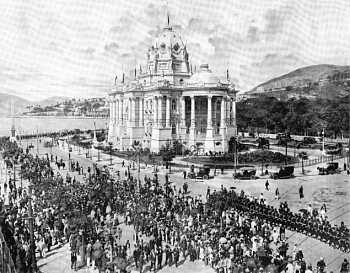
Palácio Monroe in 1910, during the funeral procession of Joaquim Nabuco.

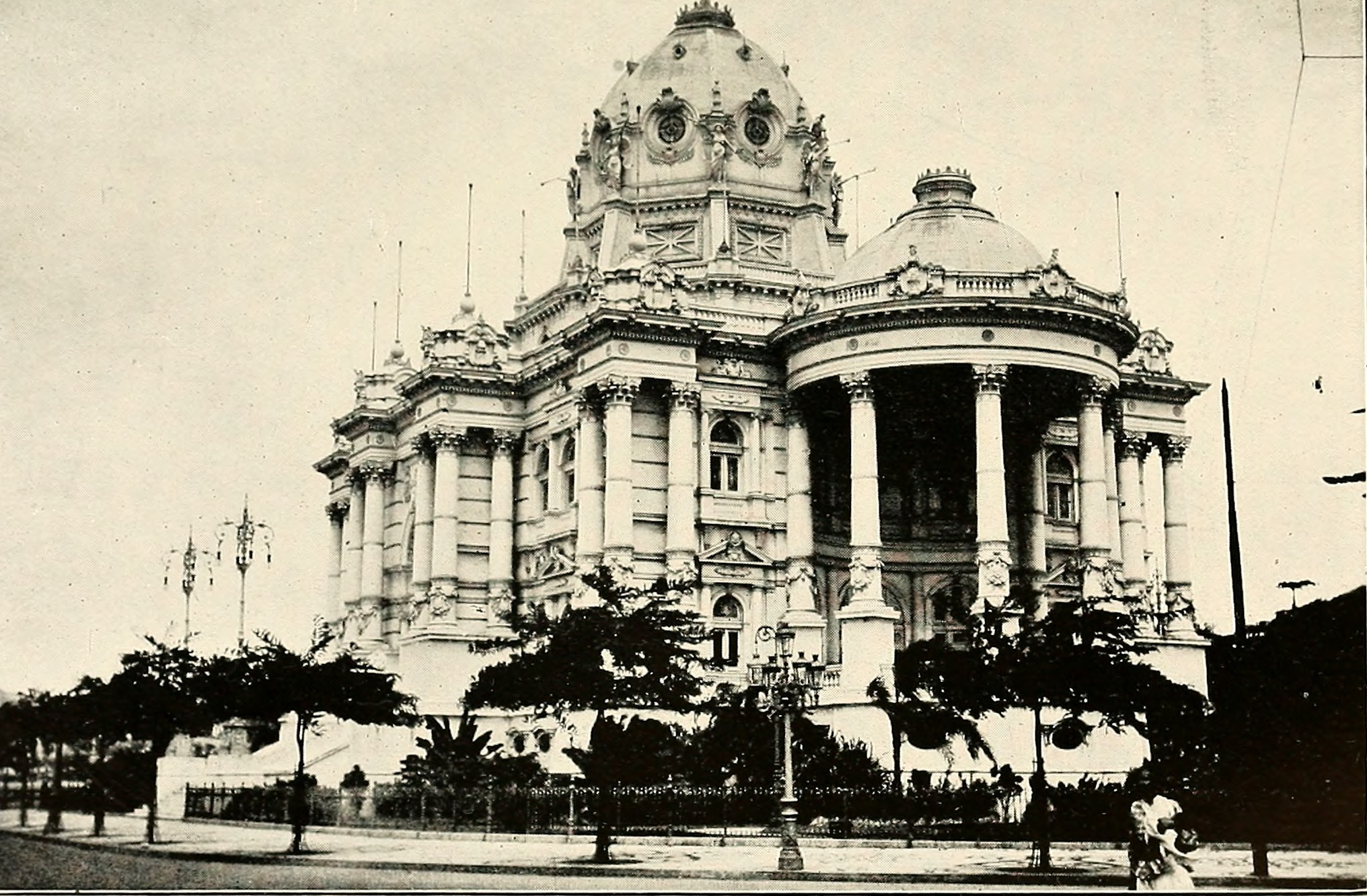
Palácio Monroe in 1912.

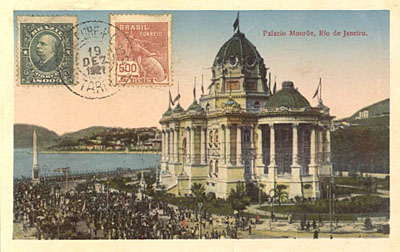
Palácio Monroe on a postcard.

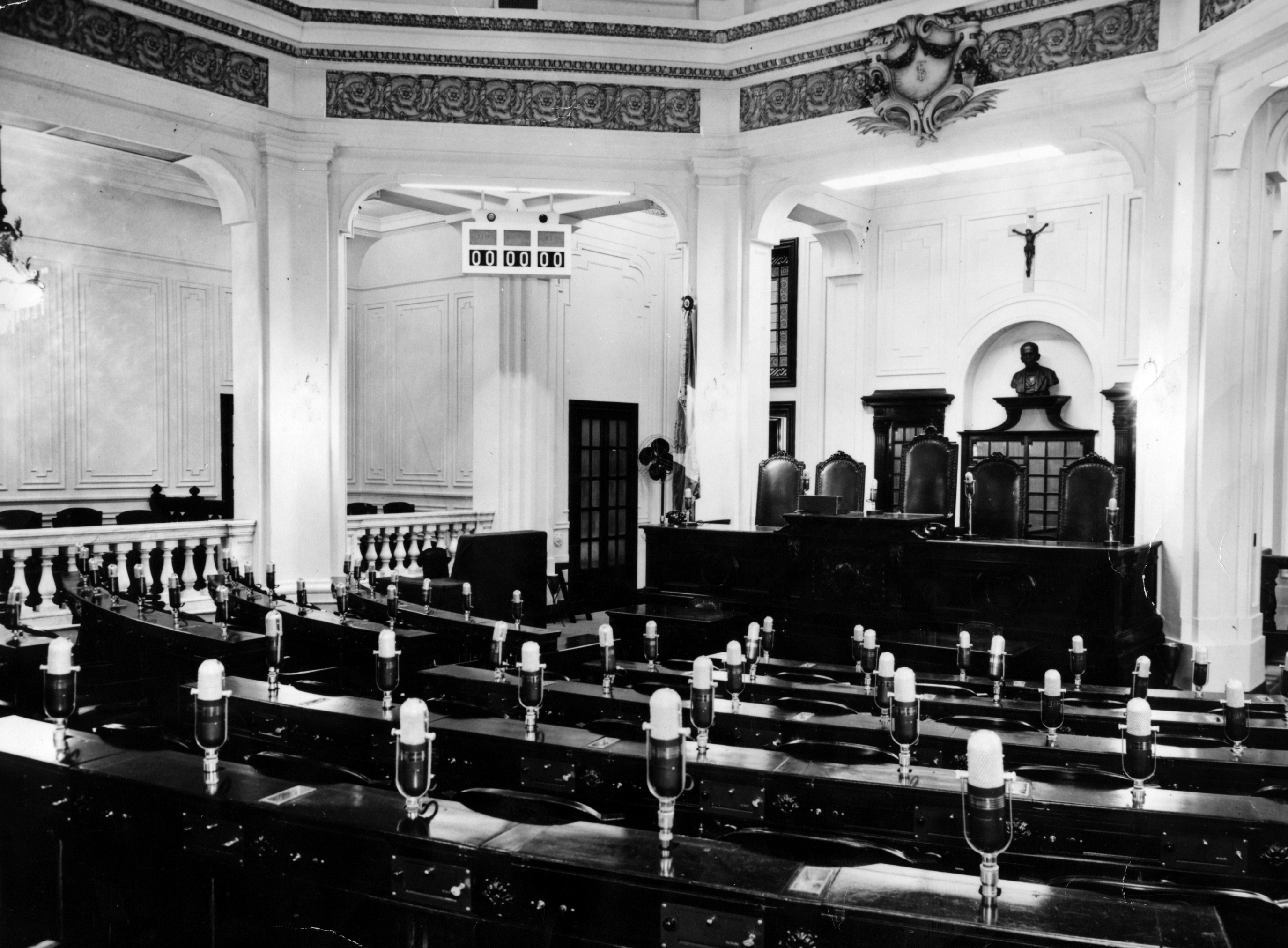
Interior of the Palácio Monroe, showing the Senate floor.

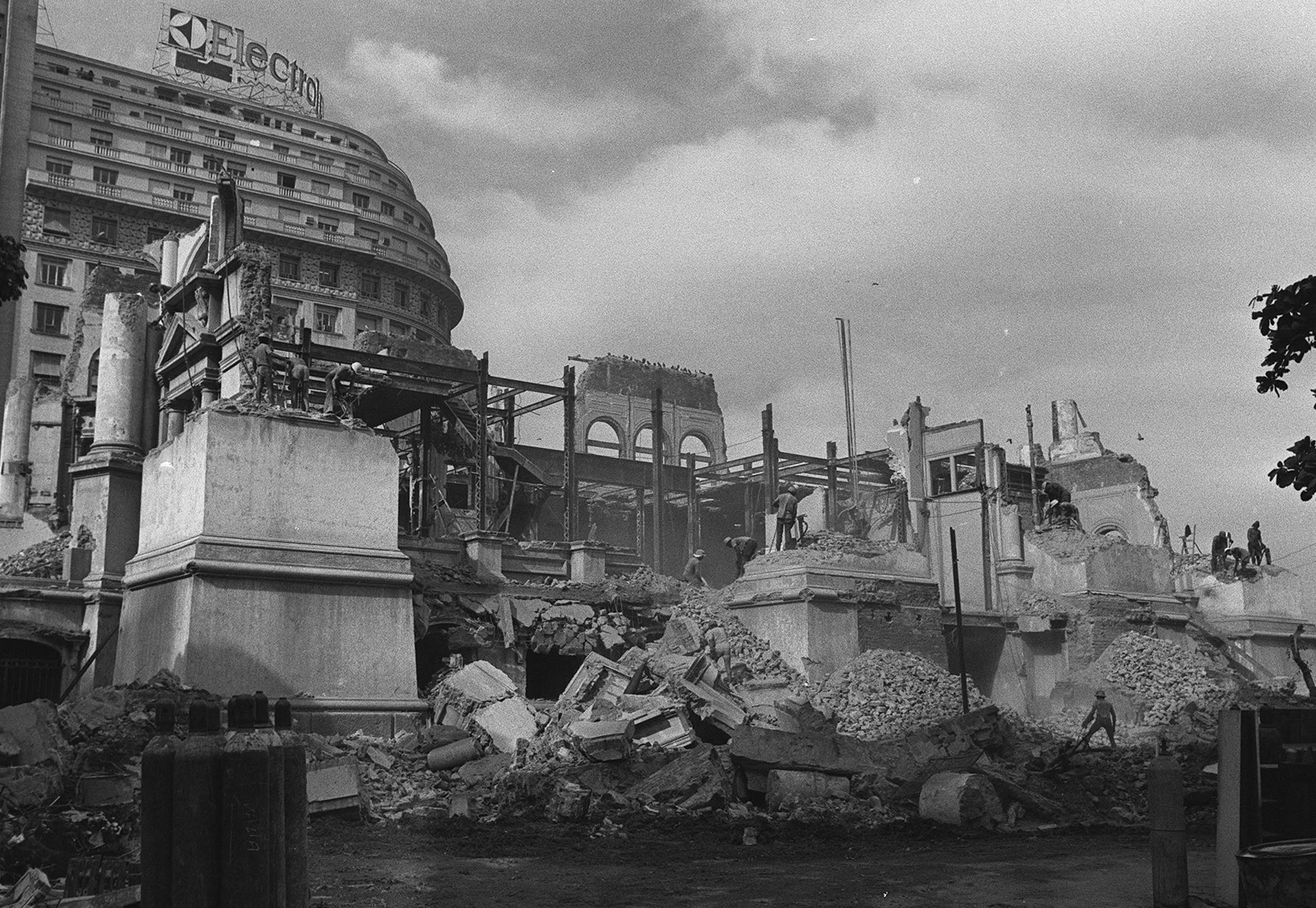
Demolition of the Palácio Monroe in 1976.

Plan of the 1st floor of the Palácio Monroe drawn in 1924, preserved in the National Archives of Brazil.
