= Catete, Rio de Janeiro =

Neighborhood in Rio de Janeiro, Brazil

Catete
- Neighborhood
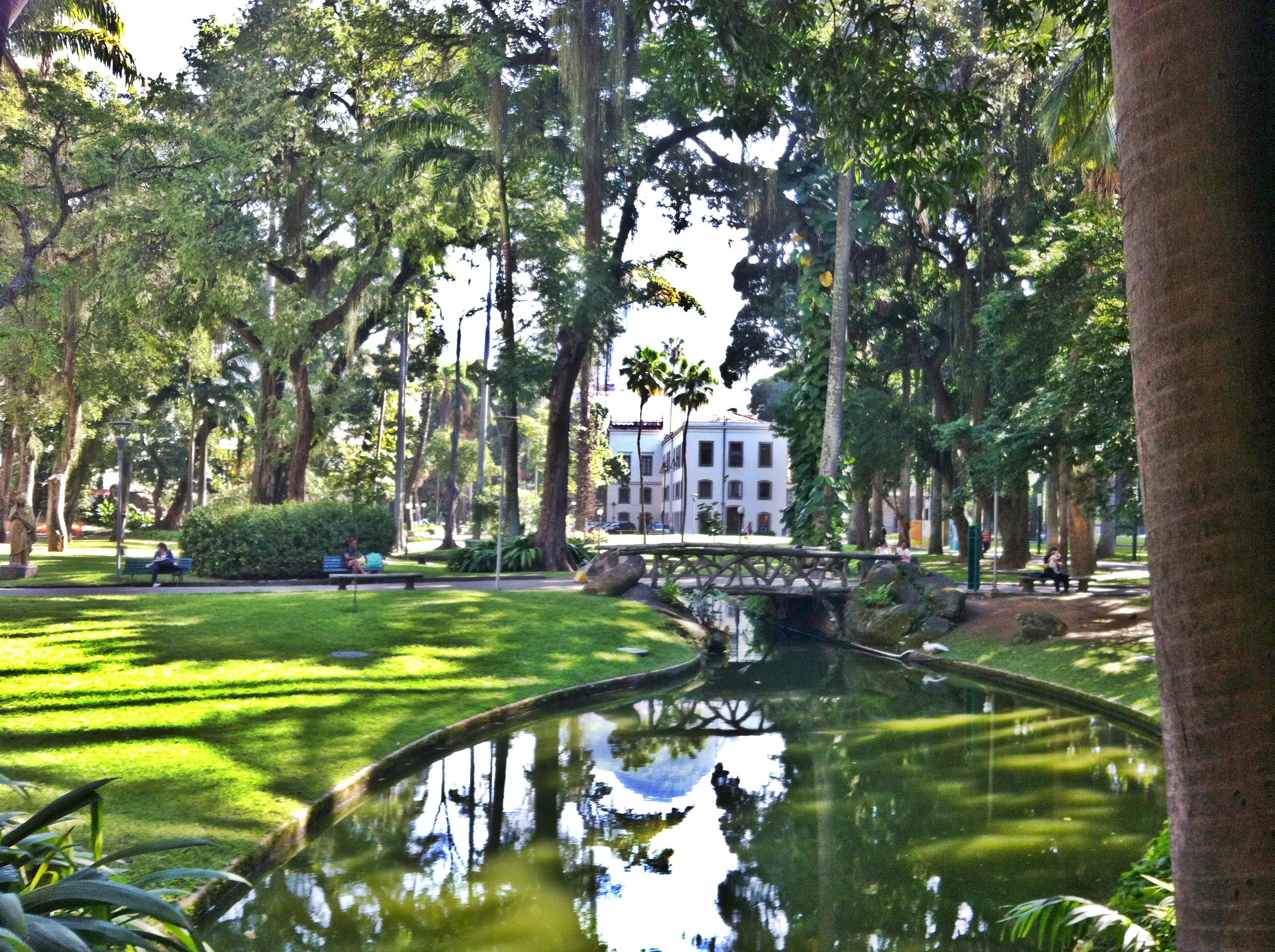
- Palácio do Catete

- Location in Rio de Janeiro Catete (Brazil)
- Coordinates: 22°55′38″S 43°10′52″W
- Country: Brazil
- State: Rio de Janeiro (RJ)
- Municipality/City: Rio de Janeiro
- Zone: South Zone
- Administrative Region: Botafogo

Area
  - Total: 68.10 ha (168.3 acres)

Population (2010)
  - Total: 24,057
  - Density: 35,330/km^{2} (91,490/sq mi)

Catete is a neighborhood in the South Zone of Rio de Janeiro, Brazil. It has strong commerce, with the majority of population being middle class.

== History ==
Catete has many historic buildings dating from the colonial period. The district was one of the noblest in Rio until the transfer of the capital city from Rio de Janeiro to Brasília, when its real estate values declined.

== Metro stations ==
Catete is served by two metro stations: Catete and Largo do Machado.
