= Capitals of Brazil =

Historical capital cities

The current capital of Brazil, since its construction in 1960, is Brasília. Rio de Janeiro was the country's capital between 1763 and 1960. The city of Salvador served as the seat for the Portuguese colonial administration in Brazil for its first two centuries and is usually called the "first capital of Brazil."

== History ==
Salvador was established in 1549 by the first Governor-General of Portuguese South America shortly after colonization began. The city became the seat of the first Catholic bishopric of Brazil in 1552 and is still the center of Brazilian Catholicism. In the 17th century, Rio de Janeiro became a far more practical export port than Salvador, and the colonial administration was moved in 1763. In 1808 the Portuguese royal family and most of the aristocracy in the Portuguese capital Lisbon fled Portugal ahead of Napoleon's invasion. The Portuguese capital was temporarily transferred from Europe to Rio de Janeiro. The city remained the capital after the independence of Brazil in 1822 and after the abolition of the monarchy in 1889.

In the 1950s plans were considered for moving the federal capital from the east coast to the interior; the interior was sparsely populated and it was hoped that moving the capital to the region would help populate the area. The new capital, Brasília, was inaugurated as the federal capital on 21 April 1960 after being purpose built for US$1.5 billion 1954 (US$17.2 billion 2023).

== National capitals of Brazil ==
- São Salvador da Bahia de Todos os Santos (1534–1763)
  - Salvador (1572–1578/1581) – capital city of the State of Maranhão
  - Salvador (1621–1640) – capital city of the State of Bahia under the Iberian Union
- São Sebastião do Rio de Janeiro (1572–1578/1581) – capital city of the State of Brazil
- Rio de Janeiro (1763–1815) – capital city of the Viceroyalty of Brazil
- Rio de Janeiro (1815–1822) – capital city of the United Kingdom of Portugal, Brazil and the Algarves
- Rio de Janeiro (1822–1889) – capital city of the Empire of Brazil
- Rio de Janeiro (1889–1960) – capital city of the Republic of the United States of Brazil
- Brasília (1960–1967) – capital city of the Republic of the United States of Brazil,
- Brasília (1967–present) – capital city of the Federative Republic of Brazil
