= Pavuna =

- Neighbourhood
- Location in Rio de Janeiro
- Coordinates: 22°49′18″S 43°20′26″W
- Country: Brazil
- State: Rio de Janeiro (RJ)
- Municipality/City: Rio de Janeiro
- Zone: North Zone

Pavuna is a neighbourhood in the North Zone of Rio de Janeiro, Brazil. It is one of the oldest places in Rio de Janeiro.

== History ==
The place was originally inhabited by native Brazilians from several Tupi tribes, one of those tribes was named Upabuna, this name being the origin of the name of the Pavuna River. During the 16th century, the Portuguese government brought enslaved Africans to the place to work in the sugarcane cultivation. In the seventeenth century, the sugarcane cultivation entered a period of decadence, only recovering a century later, and then being replaced by the coffee production. On July 23, 1981, Pavuna officially became a Rio de Janeiro neighbourhood.

== Etymology ==
Pavuna means "dark place" in the language of the local native Brazilians who inhabited the place in the past.
