= Pavuna Station =

Metro station in Rio de Janeiro, Brazil

Pavuna
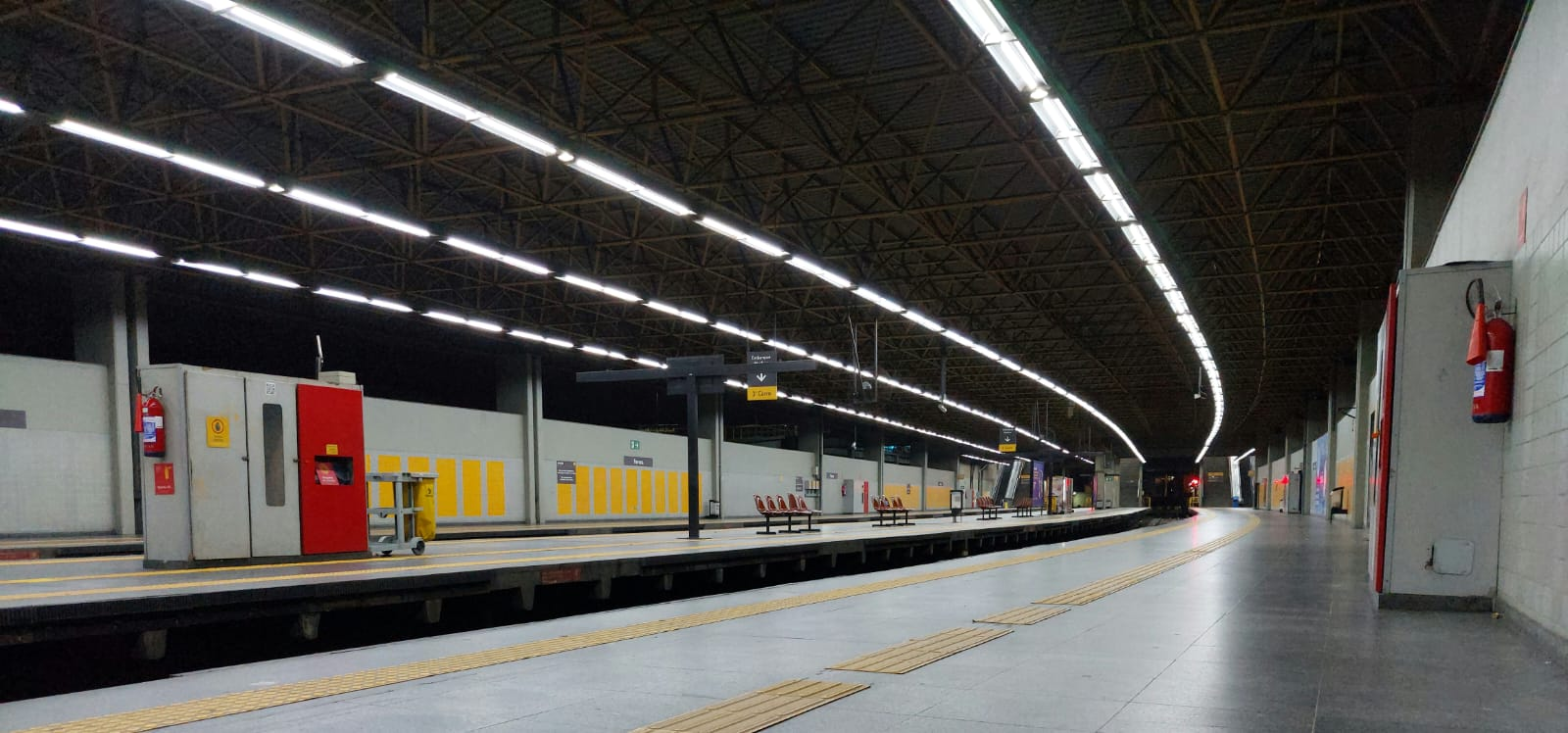

General information
- Location: Avenida Pastor Martin Luther King Jr; Pavuna, Rio de Janeiro; Brazil
- Coordinates: 22.806161°S 43.365813°W
- Operator: Metrô Rio
- Line: Line 2

Other information
- Station code: PVN

History
- Opened: 1998; 28 years ago

Services
Preceding station	Rio de Janeiro Metro	Following station
Terminus	Line 2	Engenheiro Rubens Paiva towards Botafogo
Location
- Location within Rio de Janeiro

Pavuna Station (Portuguese: Estação Pavuna) is a subway station on the Rio de Janeiro Metro that services the neighbourhood of Pavuna in the North Zone of Rio de Janeiro.
