= Botafogo Station =

Metro station in Rio de Janeiro, Brazil

Botafogo
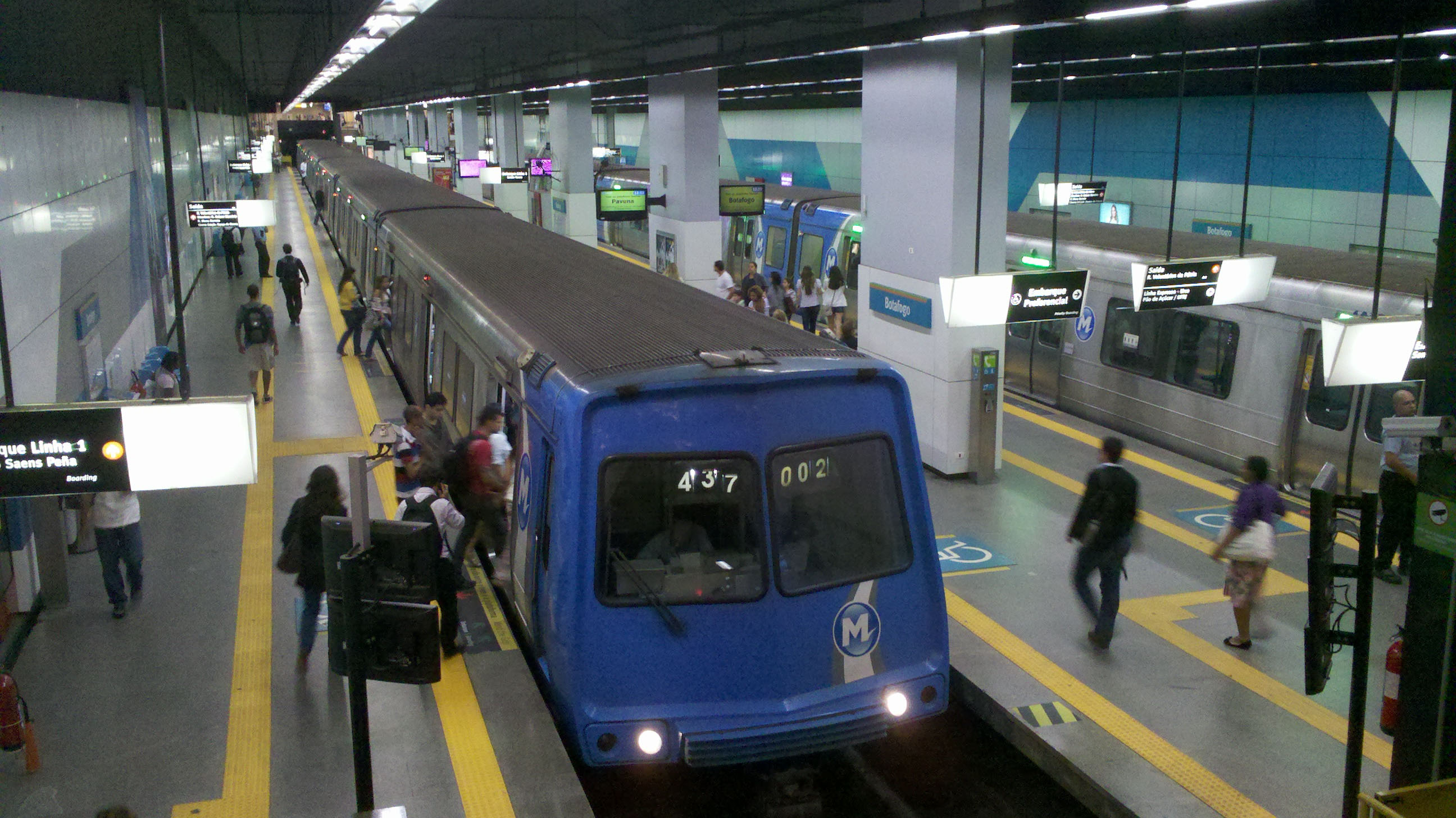
- Train at Botafogo station

General information
- Location: Rua Nelson Mandela; Botafogo, Rio de Janeiro; Brazil
- Coordinates: 22.950236°S 43.184197°W
- Operator: Metrô Rio
- Lines: Line 1 Line 2
- Connections: Metrô Na Superfície bus - Botafogo to Gavéa

Construction
- Accessible: yes

Other information
- Station code: BTF

History
- Opened: 1981; 45 years ago
- Former names: Botafogo

Services
Preceding station	Rio de Janeiro Metro	Following station
Flamengo towards Uruguai	Line 1	Cardeal Arcoverde towards General Osório
Flamengo towards Pavuna	Line 2	Terminus
Location
- Location within Rio de Janeiro

Botafogo Station (Portuguese: Estação Botafogo; previously Botafogo/Coca-Cola Station) is a subway station on the Rio de Janeiro Metro that serves the neighbourhood of Botafogo in the South Zone of Rio de Janeiro.

The station was renamed on 1 January 2021, from Botafogo Station to Botafogo/Coca-Cola Station, after a naming rights purchase by the Brazilian branch of The Coca-Cola Company. Due to the COVID-19 pandemic, Metrô Rio had been operating at a loss – in July 2020, the passenger flow was just 57% of what it had been in the same period before the pandemic, and the accumulated deficit was already at R$ 150 million. The station's naming rights sale was used as an alternate mean to generate revenue, and it was chosen for the purchase due to its proximity to Coca-Cola's headquarters, on Botafogo Beach. This change was subsequently reverted between 5 and 7 November 2022, removing the branding and restoring the station's original name.

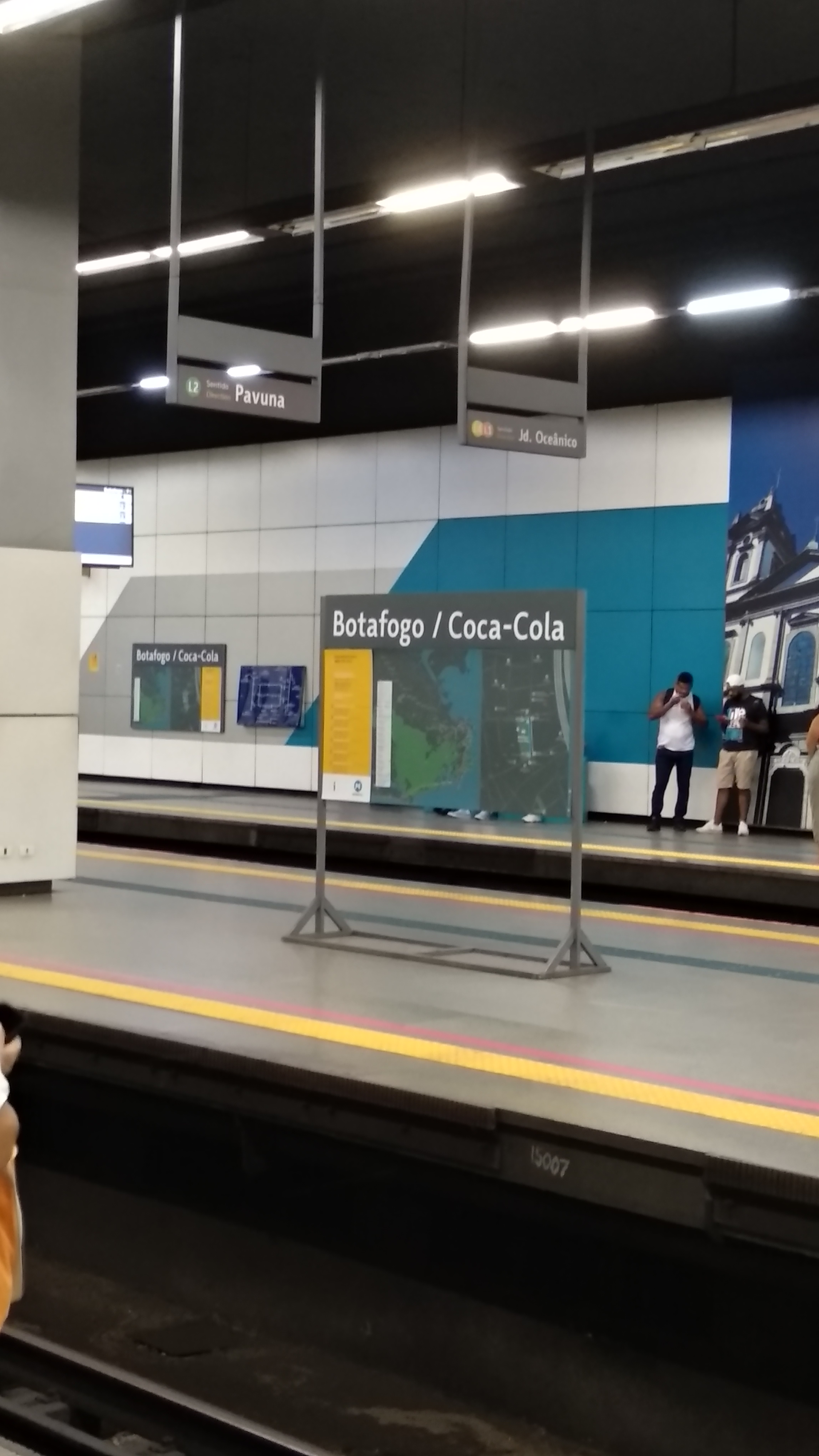
The station in March 2022, when it was still "Botafogo/Coca-Cola"

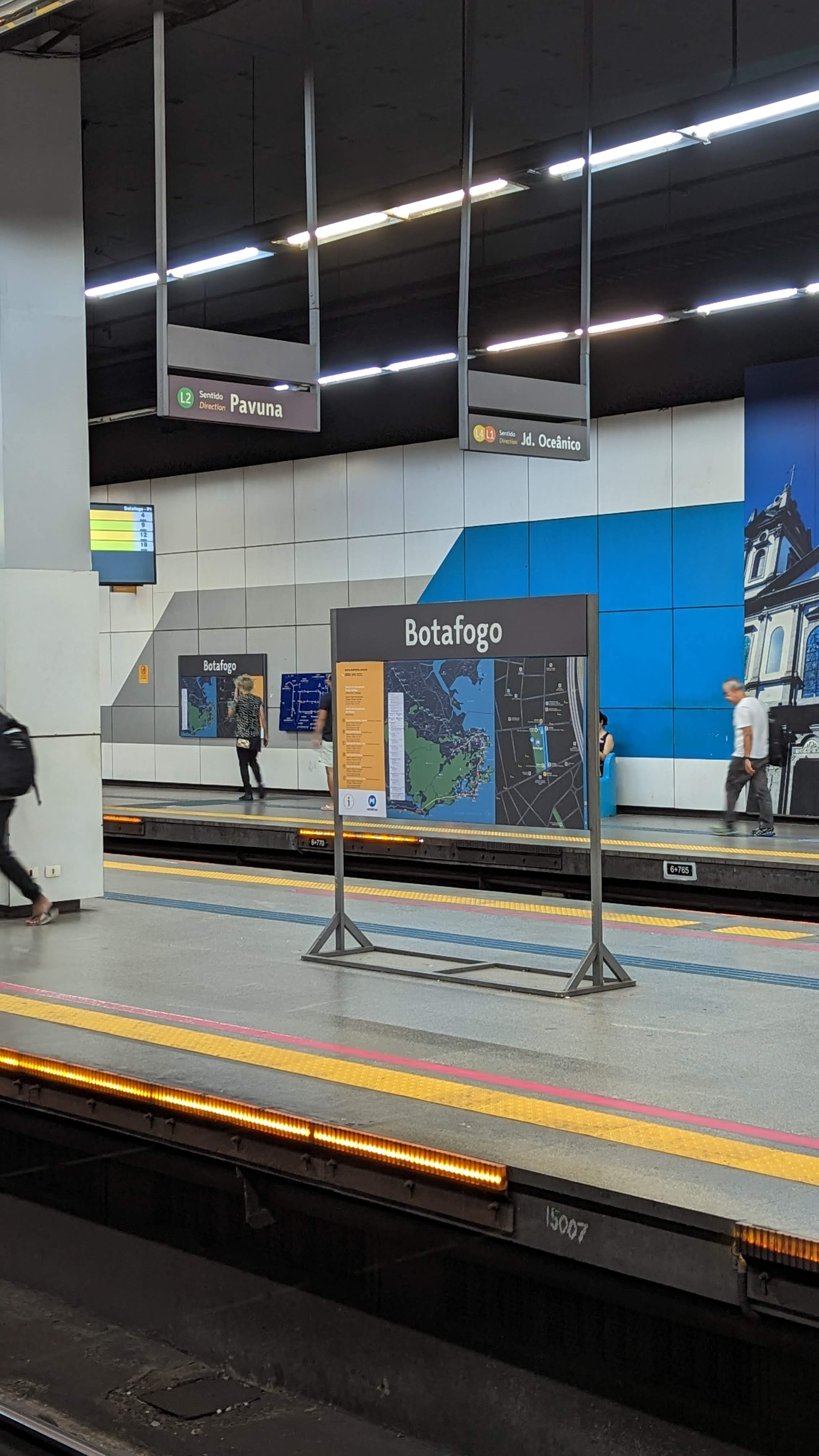
The station in February 2023, after its name was reverted to simply "Botafogo"

== Passenger traffic ==
Although the station has been in operation since 1981, passenger data is only made available from 1998 onwards.

Historical passenger traffic

Year	Passengers	±%
1998	8,484,474	—
1999	9,234,753	+8.8%
2000	9,882,302	+7.0%
2001	9,573,236	−3.1%
2002	9,666,030	+1.0%
2003	9,389,341	−2.9%
2004	9,448,144	+0.6%
2005	9,851,428	+4.3%
2006	10,271,355	+4.3%
2007	11,407,154	+11.1%
2008	12,368,386	+8.4%
2009	12,399,348	+0.3%
2010	13,487,265	+8.8%

Year	Passengers	±%
2011	14,617,633	+8.4%
2012	15,043,239	+2.9%
2013	15,693,647	+4.3%
2014	17,390,660	+10.8%
2015	18,350,472	+5.5%
2016	19,394,585	+5.7%
2017	17,767,004	−8.4%
2018	17,403,757	−2.0%
2019	17,855,069	+2.6%
2020	7,665,326	−57.1%
2021	7,926,732	+3.4%
2022	11,563,325	+45.9%

Note: This table displays the total number of passengers reportedly transported in the station in a given year.
Source: Rio de Janeiro Municipal Government.
