= Line 2 (Rio de Janeiro) =

Metro line in Rio de Janeiro

Rio de Janeiro Metro Line 2 (Green)

Overview
- Status: Operational
- Owner: Government of the State of Rio de Janeiro
- Locale: Rio de Janeiro, Brazil
- Termini: Pavuna; Botafogo
- Stations: 29

Service
- Type: Rapid transit
- System: Rio de Janeiro Metro
- Operator(s): MetrôRio

History
- Opened: 19 November 1981

Technical
- Line length: 30 km (19 mi)
- Track gauge: 1,600 mm (5 ft 3 in)
- Electrification: 750 V DC third rail
- Operating speed: 80 km/h (50 mph)

Line 2 (Green) of the Rio de Janeiro Metro serves working-class residential neighborhoods, extending from the city centre towards the North side of the city. It is a diagonal line, and almost completely above ground (mostly elevated). This line started as a light rail line, but for increasing commuters, it gradually changed to metro standards. It is elevated except for Estácio and Cidade Nova stations, which are underground and at-grade, respectively.
