= Juninho =

Juninho, Portuguese for "little Junior", is a common nickname in Brazil for those whose full name includes Júnior. It is often combined with an epithet, sometimes a demonym (a word derived from their place of origin). The following football players are known by some derivation of the name:

- Juninho Fonseca (born 1958), full name Alcides Fonseca Júnior, Brazil international centre-back
- Juninho Paulista (born 1973), full name Osvaldo Giroldo Júnior, Brazil international attacking midfielder
- Juninho da Silva (born 1974), full name Edivaldo Sarafim da Silva Júnior, Brazilian football midfielder
- Juninho Petrolina (born 1974), full name Hamilton Timbira Dias dos Santos Júnior, Brazilian attacking midfielder
- Juninho Pernambucano (born 1975), full name Antônio Augusto Ribeiro Reis Júnior, Brazil international attacking midfielder
- Juninho (footballer, born 1977), full name Carlos Alberto Carvalho dos Anjos Junior, Brazilian football striker
- Juninho Cearense (born 1980), full name Regilson Saboya Monteiro Júnior, Brazilian football midfielder
- Juninho (footballer, born April 1981), full name Renato Agostinho de Oliveira Júnior, Brazilian football centre-back
- Juninho (footballer, born May 1981), full name Fidelis Júnior Santana da Silva, Brazilian football midfielder
- Juninho (footballer, born July 1981), full name Tadeu Jesus Nogueira Júnior, Brazilian football goalkeeper
- Juninho (footballer, born July 1982), full name Osvaldo José Martins Júnior, Brazilian football midfielder
- Juninho (footballer, born September 1982), full name Anselmo Vendrechovski Júnior, Brazilian football centre-back
- Juninho (footballer, born 1983), full name Junio César Arcanjo, Brazilian football attacking midfielder
- Juninho Tardelli (born 1983), full name José Tadeu Martins Júnior, Brazilian football midfielder
- Juninho (footballer, born 1984), full name Wilson Aparecido Xavier Júnior, Brazilian football midfielder
- Juninho (footballer, born 5 April 1985), full name Júnior César Moreira da Cunha, Brazilian football forward
- Juninho (footballer, born 21 April 1985), full name Gilson Luís Pinheiro Júnior, Brazilian football midfielder
- Juninho (footballer, born July 1985), full name Jose Carlos Nogueira Junior, Brazilian football forward
- Juninho Quixadá (born 1985), full name Pedro Julião Azevedo Junior, Brazilian football forward
- Juninho (footballer, born 1986), full name Paulo Roberto Valoura Júnior, Brazilian football midfielder
- Juninho (footballer, born March 1987), full name José Artur de Melo Júnior, Brazilian football forward
- Juninho (footballer, born November 1987), full name Adilson dos Anjos Oliveira, Brazilian football defensive midfielder
- Juninho Botelho (born 1987), full name José Francisco da Silva Botelho Júnior, Brazilian football midfielder
- Juninho (footballer, born January 1989), full name Vitor Gomes Pereira Junior, Brazilian football midfielder
- Juninho (footballer, born June 1989), full name Roberto Neves Adam Júnior, Brazilian football midfielder
- Juninho (footballer, born May 1989), full name Júnior Aparecido Guimaro de Souza, Brazilian football winger
- Juninho (footballer, born January 1990), full name Evanildo Borges Barbosa Júnior, Brazilian football left-back
- Juninho (footballer, born December 1990), full name Walter Soares Belitardo Júnior, Brazilian football attacking midfielder
- Juninho Potiguar (born 1990), full name Jarlesson Inácio Júnior, Brazilian football forward
- Juninho (footballer, born 1992), full name Denilton Venturim Júnior, Brazilian football defensive midfielder
- Juninho Cabral (born 1992), full name Jacinto Júnior Conceição Cabral, Brazilian football striker
- Juninho (footballer, born 1994), full name Junior Silva Ferreira, Brazilian football midfielder
- Juninho (footballer, born February 1995), full name José Carlos Ferreira Júnior, Brazilian football centre-back
- Juninho (footballer, born September 1995), full name Eduardo José Barbosa da Silva Júnior, Brazilian football midfielder
- Juninho (footballer, born December 1995), full name Leovigildo Júnior Reis Rodrigues, Brazilian football centre-back
- Juninho (footballer, born 1996), full name Olávio Vieira dos Santos Júnior, Brazilian football forward
- Juninho Barros (born 1996), full name André Alexandre de Barros Junior, Brazilian football midfielder
- Juninho Bacuna (born 1997), Curaçao football midfielder
- Juninho Rocha (born 1997), full name Paulo Afonso da Rocha Junior, Brazilian football forward
- Juninho Capixaba (born 1997), full name Luis Antônio da Rocha Júnior, Brazilian football left-back
- Juninho (footballer, born 1999), full name Edimar Ribeiro da Costa Junior, Brazilian football forward
- Kleber Juninho (born 1999), full name Kleber Alves da Costa Junior, Brazilian football winger
- Juninho (footballer, born 2000), full name Antonio Valmor Assis Da Silva Junior, Brazilian football forward
- Juninho (footballer, born 2001), full name Alexandre de Almeida Silva Júnior, Brazilian football midfielder
- Juninho (footballer, born 2003), full name Luiz Fernando Silvestre Junior, Brazilian football midfielder

== See also ==
- Junior – also a common nickname for Brazilian footballers
- Vitor Júnior (born 1986), full name Vítor Silva Assis de Oliveira Jr., Brazilian football attacking midfielder sometimes known as Juninho
