= Itaperuna =

- Municipality
- Município de Itaperuna
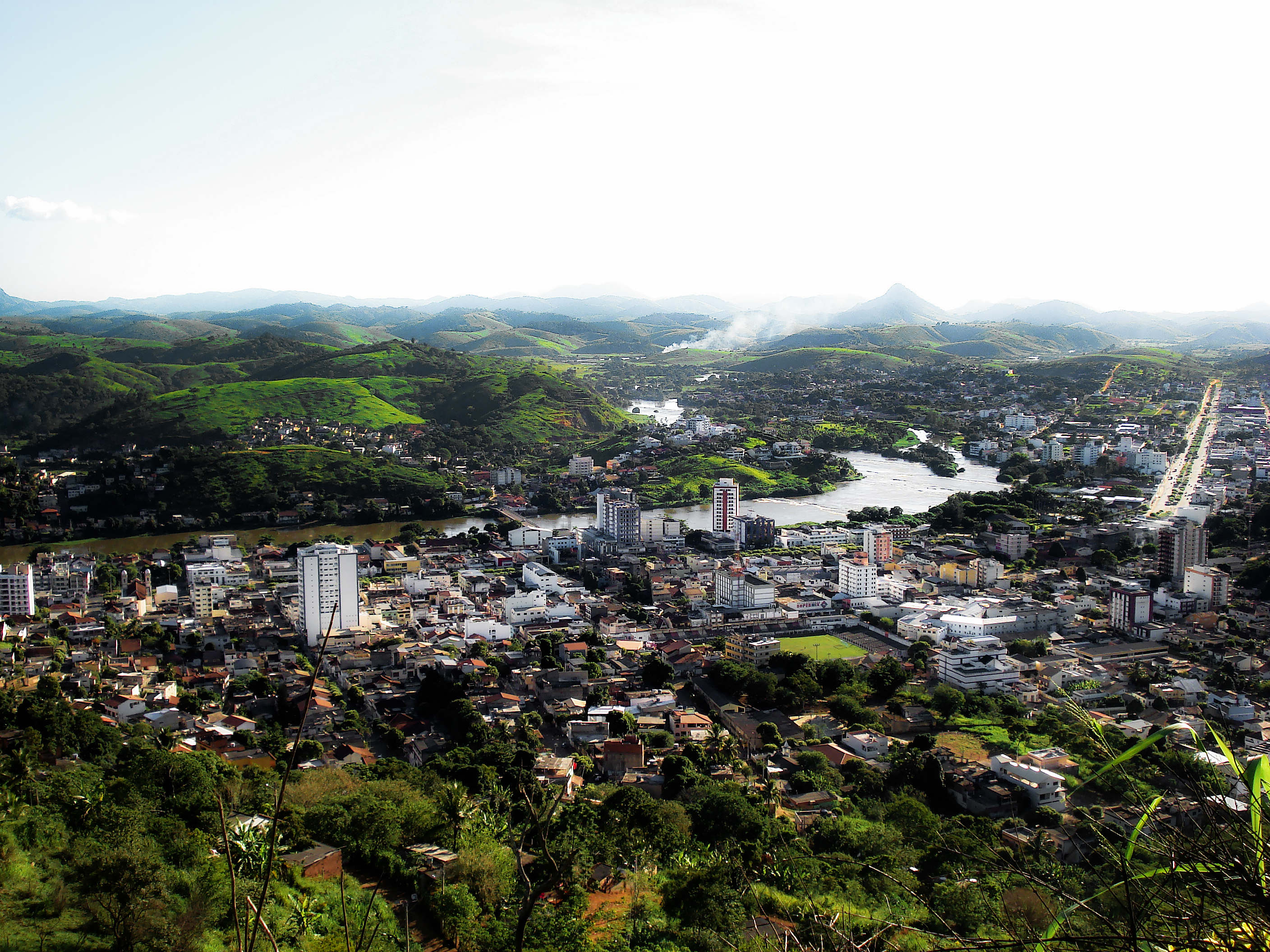

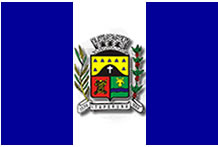
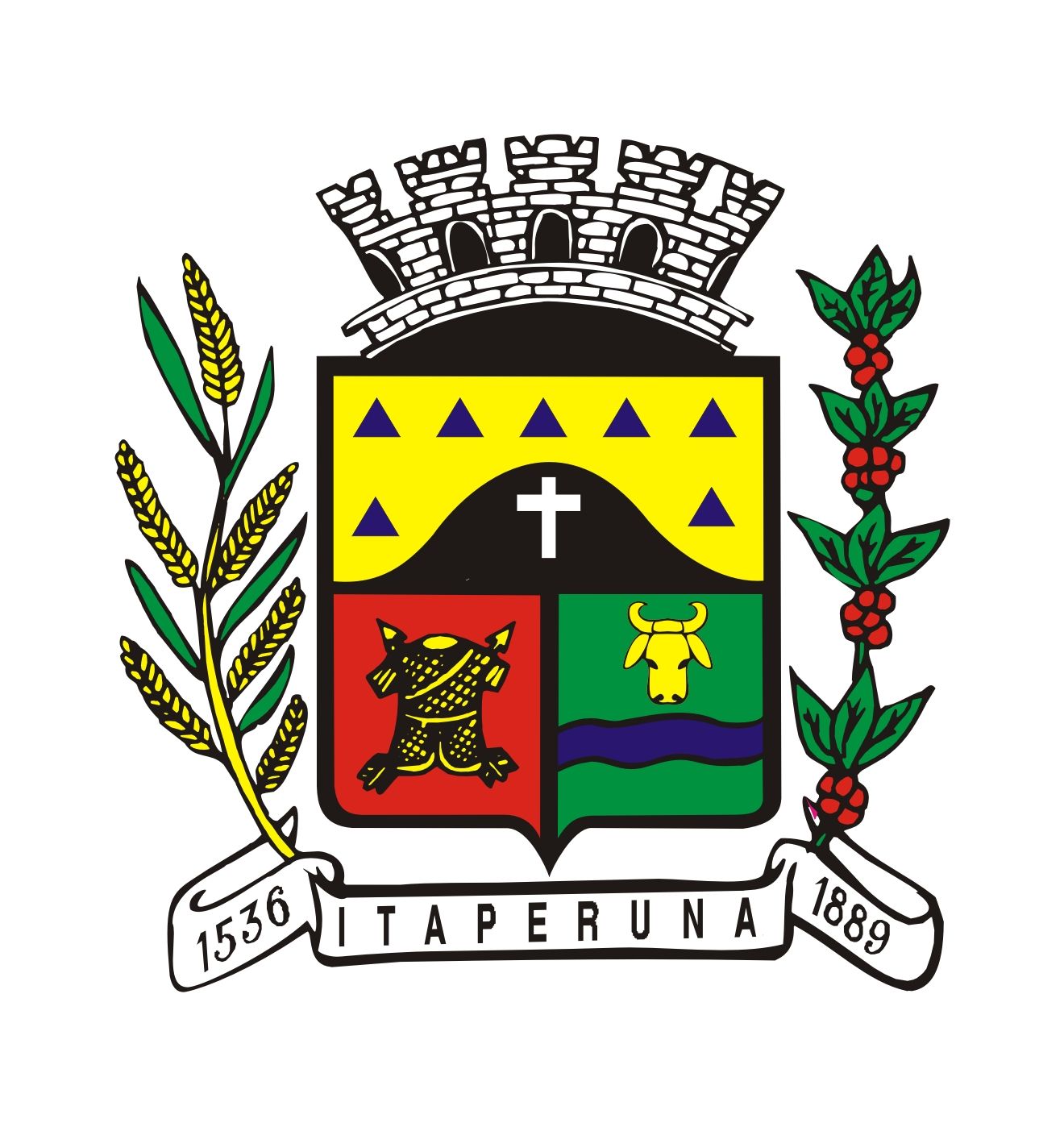
- Flag Coat of arms

- Location of Itaperuna in the state of Rio de Janeiro

- Location of Itaperuna in Brazil
- Coordinates: 21°12′18″S 41°53′16″W
- Country: Brazil
- Region: Southeast
- State: Rio de Janeiro

Government
  - Prefeito: Marcus Vinícius de Oliveira Pinto (PR)

Area
  - Total: 1,105.566 km^{2} (426.861 sq mi)
- Elevation: 108 m (354 ft)

Population (2022 Census)
  - Total: 101,041
  - Estimate (2025): 107,297
  - Density: 91.3930/km^{2} (236.707/sq mi)
- Time zone: UTC-3 (UTC-3)

Itaperuna (Portuguese pronunciation: [itapeˈɾunɐ]) is a municipality in the Brazilian state of Rio de Janeiro. It had a population of 101,041 in 2022 Census, and has an area of 1.105,3 km^{2}.

== History ==
Itaperuna was founded in 1889, after being separated from the municipality of Campos dos Goytacazes.

== Location ==
Itaperuna is located 230 km from the state capital Rio de Janeiro. Its neighbouring municipalities are:

- Bom Jesus do Itabapoana – north, northeast and east
- Campos dos Goytacazes – east
- Italva – east and southeast
- Cambuci – south
- São José de Ubá – south
- Miracema – southwest
- Laje do Muriaé – west
- Patrocínio de Muriaé – northwest
- Eugenópolis – northwest
- Antônio Prado de Minas – northwest

== Climate ==
Climate data for Itaperuna (1991–2020)
Month	Jan	Feb	Mar	Apr	May	Jun	Jul	Aug	Sep	Oct	Nov	Dec	Year
Mean daily maximum °C (°F)	33.0 (91.4)	33.5 (92.3)	32.2 (90.0)	30.6 (87.1)	28.4 (83.1)	27.8 (82.0)	27.9 (82.2)	28.8 (83.8)	29.9 (85.8)	30.7 (87.3)	30.4 (86.7)	31.8 (89.2)	30.4 (86.7)
Daily mean °C (°F)	27.0 (80.6)	27.1 (80.8)	26.3 (79.3)	24.8 (76.6)	22.2 (72.0)	21.0 (69.8)	20.9 (69.6)	21.8 (71.2)	23.2 (73.8)	24.5 (76.1)	24.9 (76.8)	26.1 (79.0)	24.2 (75.6)
Mean daily minimum °C (°F)	22.6 (72.7)	22.5 (72.5)	22.2 (72.0)	20.7 (69.3)	17.8 (64.0)	16.3 (61.3)	15.8 (60.4)	16.4 (61.5)	18.2 (64.8)	20.1 (68.2)	21.0 (69.8)	22.1 (71.8)	19.6 (67.3)
Average precipitation mm (inches)	189.9 (7.48)	120.0 (4.72)	150.7 (5.93)	68.8 (2.71)	41.5 (1.63)	21.3 (0.84)	15.4 (0.61)	21.3 (0.84)	61.3 (2.41)	89.8 (3.54)	197.1 (7.76)	227.5 (8.96)	1,204.6 (47.43)
Average precipitation days (≥ 1.0 mm)	11.1	8.0	9.5	6.3	4.7	2.5	2.6	3.1	4.7	6.9	12.5	13.8	85.7
Average dew point °C (°F)	22.3 (72.1)	22.2 (72.0)	22.2 (72.0)	21.1 (70.0)	18.8 (65.8)	17.7 (63.9)	16.8 (62.2)	16.8 (62.2)	17.8 (64.0)	19.3 (66.7)	20.7 (69.3)	22.0 (71.6)	19.8 (67.6)
Mean monthly sunshine hours	217.8	221.1	207.2	194.2	189.9	186.5	197.8	211.5	184.7	183.1	159.3	185.2	2,338.3
Source: NOAA

== Transportation ==
The city is served by Ernani do Amaral Peixoto Airport.
