= Santo Antônio de Pádua =

- Municipality
- Município de Santo Antônio de Pádua
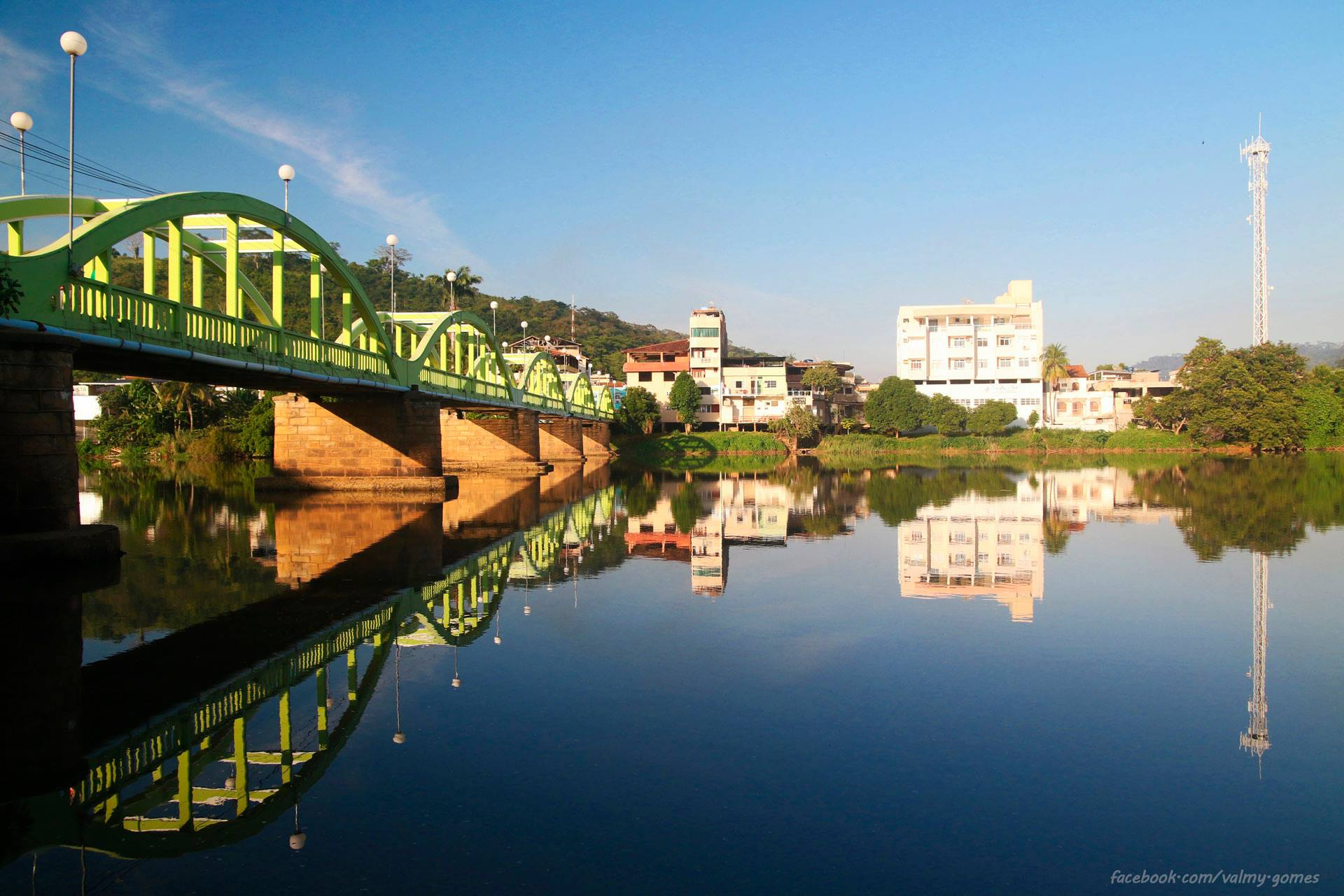
- Raul Veiga Bridge

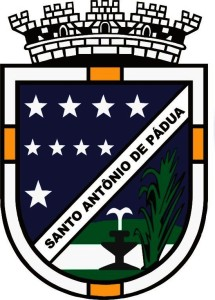
- Flag Coat of arms

- Location of Santo Antônio de Pádua in the state of Rio de Janeiro

- Location of Santo Antônio de Pádua in Brazil
- Coordinates: 21°32′20″S 42°10′48″W
- Country: Brazil
- Region: Southeast
- State: Rio de Janeiro

Government
  - Prefeito: Josias de Oliveira (PSB)

Area
  - Total: 611.981 km^{2} (236.287 sq mi)
- Elevation: 86 m (282 ft)

Population (2020)
  - Total: 42,594
- Time zone: UTC−3 (BRT)

Santo Antônio de Pádua (Portuguese pronunciation: [ˈsɐ̃twɐ̃ˈtõɲu dʒi ˈpadwɐ], Saint Anthony of Padua) is a municipality located in the northeastern part of the Brazilian state of Rio de Janeiro. Its population was 42,594 (2020) and its area is 612 km^{2}.

== Districts ==
- Santo Antônio de Pádua (seat)
- Baltazar
- Campelo
- Ibitiguaçu
- Marangatu
- Monte Alegre
- Paraoquena
- Santa Cruz

== Neighboring municipalities ==
- Miracema
- São José de Ubá
- Cambuci
- Aperibé
- Itaocara
- Pirapetinga (MG)

== Coat of arms ==
The coat of arms of Santo Antônio de Pádua features eight stars representing eight of its districts on a navy blue field of the shield with a tree on the right and a fountain in the middle. The municipality's name is centered in the shield and it runs diagonally from bottom left to top right. The shield is bordered with four orange rectangles on each side. The crown is on the top of the coat of arms.

== Climate ==
Climate data for Santo Antônio de Pádua (1981–2010)
Month	Jan	Feb	Mar	Apr	May	Jun	Jul	Aug	Sep	Oct	Nov	Dec	Year
Mean daily maximum °C (°F)	33.6 (92.5)	34.2 (93.6)	33.1 (91.6)	31.5 (88.7)	28.6 (83.5)	27.6 (81.7)	27.6 (81.7)	29.2 (84.6)	29.7 (85.5)	30.8 (87.4)	31.0 (87.8)	32.4 (90.3)	30.8 (87.4)
Daily mean °C (°F)	26.6 (79.9)	26.9 (80.4)	26.2 (79.2)	24.2 (75.6)	21.3 (70.3)	19.7 (67.5)	19.6 (67.3)	21.0 (69.8)	22.7 (72.9)	24.3 (75.7)	24.8 (76.6)	25.9 (78.6)	23.6 (74.5)
Mean daily minimum °C (°F)	22.0 (71.6)	21.9 (71.4)	21.5 (70.7)	20.0 (68.0)	16.8 (62.2)	14.7 (58.5)	14.4 (57.9)	15.2 (59.4)	17.4 (63.3)	19.4 (66.9)	20.3 (68.5)	21.5 (70.7)	18.8 (65.8)
Average precipitation mm (inches)	222.8 (8.77)	113.2 (4.46)	118.4 (4.66)	65.9 (2.59)	26.6 (1.05)	18.2 (0.72)	18.2 (0.72)	25.0 (0.98)	65.8 (2.59)	109.4 (4.31)	187.7 (7.39)	267.6 (10.54)	1,238.8 (48.77)
Average precipitation days (≥ 1.0 mm)	13	9	10	6	3	3	3	2	6	8	13	15	91
Average relative humidity (%)	75.4	74.2	76.7	78.6	79.3	80.7	78.1	72.3	70.9	71.9	76.4	77.4	76.0
Source: Instituto Nacional de Meteorologia
