= Fluminense Federal University =

Public university in Niterói, Rio de Janeiro state, Brazil

Coordinates: 22°54′15″S 43°07′00″W

Federal Fluminense University
- Universidade Federal Fluminense
- Seal of Federal Fluminense University
- Other name: UFF
- Former name: Universidade Federal do Estado do Rio de Janeiro (in English: Federal University of the State of Rio de Janeiro)
- Motto: Discere, docere, seminare
- Motto in English: Learn, teach, sow
- Type: Public
- Established: June 3, 1912 (114 years ago) (Law School); December 18, 1960 (65 years ago) (University)
- Academic affiliations: CRUB, RENEX, REARI-RJ, Utrecht Network
- Endowment: R$ 1,470 billion (2016)
- Chancellor: Antonio Claudio Lucas da Nóbrega
- Vice-Chancellor: Fabio Barboza Passos
- Head of Cabinet: Denise Aparecida de Miranda Rosas
- Academic staff: 3,249
- Administrative staff: 6,505
- Students: 66,186
- Undergraduates: 43,628
- Postgraduates: 22,168
- Other students: 390 (Elementary, Middle and High School)
- Location: Niterói, Rio de Janeiro, Brazil
- Campus: 10 cities; Angra dos Reis, Cachoeiras de Macacu, Campos dos Goytacazes, Macaé, Niterói, Nova Friburgo, Petrópolis, Rio das Ostras and Volta Redonda, in the state of Rio de Janeiro and Oriximiná, in the state of Pará.
- Language: Portuguese
- Colours: White and blue
- Nickname: UFF Ativa
- Website: www.uff.br

The Fluminense Federal University (Portuguese: Universidade Federal Fluminense, UFF, named after the state's demonym) is a Brazilian public higher education institution located mainly in Niterói and in other cities of Rio de Janeiro state. It was first established on December 18, 1960, with the name of Universidade Federal do Estado do Rio de Janeiro (UFERJ), through an integration of different academic colleges in the city of Niterói. On November 5, 1965, the current name became official.

It is considered one of the main centers of excellence in Brazil, ranked in the 17th (out of 68) national position in the Center for World University Rankings of the best universities and 889th (out of 1000) world position. UFF is among the top 25 universities in Latin America, according to research published by the Webometrics Ranking of World Universities. Besides, UFF has become the sixteenth largest university in the country, the sixth largest public university and the third largest federal university in the country. The university's Cinema and Audiovisual major is also a reference in Brazil. Created in 1968, by filmmaker Nelson Pereira dos Santos, the course is an official cultural heritage of the city of Niterói.

== History ==
UFF was established in 1960, with the name Universidade Federal do Estado do Rio de Janeiro (UFERJ). The university began with the merger of five existing federal institutions in Niterói, three state institutions and two private colleges, becoming a part of the federal government and being renamed Universidade Federal Fluminense (Federal Fluminense University).

After a rough start, with a power struggle due to the institutions’ different administrations, the military government ruling at that time imposed a model structure for the university to its units and departments. Following the country's tradition in other institutions at the time, the main aim of the university was academic training, focusing on resources to qualify citizens for professional development. Research had a more formal role, and extension programs had different functions, with the main aim to offer services to the community. Today, these remain the three pillars of the university.

In the 1990s, UFF expanded and began to offer new programs in campuses in different towns in regional areas if Rio de Janeiro state. From these programs, new departments and colleges were established. In the 2000s, these regional units were known as University Centers (Pólos Universitários da UFF).

== The University ==
=== Location (campuses) ===
Its headquarters and the major number of UFF unities are located in the city of Niterói. Besides Niterói, the university has academic unities in other cities inside the Rio de Janeiro state, being the Federal University present in the highest number of municipalities in the country.

UFF is also part of the CEDERJ Consortium, which teaches distance learning undergraduation courses through centers located in the Rio de Janeiro state.

==== In the city of Niterói (its headquarters) ====
There are three major campuses in the city: Gragoatá Campus, Praia Vermelha Campus, and Valonguinho Campus. Additionally, several courses are located off-campuses in the city of Niterói.

- Gragoatá Campus hosts the History, Anthropology, Social Sciences, Public Policies, Philosophy, Sociology, Psychology, Pedagogy, Languages (German, Spanish, French, Greek, English, Italian, Latin and Portuguese/Literatures), Social Service, Economics, Mathematics, Statistics, Hotel Management, Public Administration, Social Service, International Relations, Tourism, and Physical Education courses. The Gragoatá Campus has contributed to a change in the neighborhood where it is located, once strictly residential, to an area that has restaurants, bookstores, and cultural areas.
- Praia Vermelha Campus hosts all the Engineering courses of the university (Chemical, Civil, Electrical, Environmental and Agricultural, Environmental and Water Resources, Mechanical, Petroleum, Production, and Telecommunications) and the courses of Architecture and Urbanism, Industrial Design, Public Safety, Computational Mathematics, Computational Physics, Computer Systems, Computing Sciences, Environmental Sciences, Geophysics, and Physics.
- Valonguinho Campus is the closest to the ferry station that goes to the city of Rio de Janeiro. It hosts majors in biological sciences, chemistry, industrial chemistry, dentistry, nutrition, business administration, accounting sciences, management processes, speech therapy, and veterinary medicine.

Some schools and institutes are located outside campuses, such as the

- Institute of Art and Social Communication: publicity and advertising, arts, archival science, cinema and audiovisual studies, cultural production, journalism, library science and documentation, and media studies.
- Law School;
- Medical School: Medicine and Pharmacy;
- Nursing School;
- Biomedical Institute;
- Veterinary School; and
- Aurora de Afonso Costa Pharmacy School.

Along with teaching facilities, UFF is also in charge for the Antônio Pedro University Hospital, Veterinary Hospital, Geraldo Reis University School (Elementary and High School), UFF Arts Center (a cultural complex with art and photographies galleries, cinema, theater, string quartet and choirs and symphonic orchestra), University Pharmacy, Accessibility and Inclusion Office, University Restaurant (low-cost meals for all the students), Shuttle bus (free campus-to-campus transportation) and Kindergarten School.

==== Satellite campuses ====
Additionally, from the main campuses in Niterói, UFF is present in twelve other municipalities in the state of Rio de Janeiro and one in the state of Pará. The satellite campuses and majors offered in each are listed below:

- Campos dos Goytacazes: Economics, Social Sciences, Geography, History, Psychology, and Social Service;
- Petrópolis: Production Engineering;
- Angra dos Reis: Public Policies, Geography, and Pedagogy;
- Nova Friburgo: Biomedicine, Dentistry, and Speech Therapy;
- Rio das Ostras: Computing Sciences, Nursing, Production Engineering, Cultural Production, Psychology, and Social Service;
- Volta Redonda: Engineering (Agribusiness, Metallurgical, Mechanical, and Production), Business Administration, Public Administration, Accounting Sciences, Law, Psychology, Computational Physics, Mathematics, and Chemistry;
- Santo Antônio de Pádua: Natural Sciences, Computing Sciences, Physics, Interdisciplinary Education in the Field, Mathematics, and Pedagogy;
- Oriximiná, Pará: Advanced Unity;
- Cachoeiras de Macacu: University Farm;
- Quissamã: Tourism;
- Macaé: Business Administration, Accounting Sciences, and Law;
- Itaperuna: Business Administration;
- Miracema: Accounting Sciences.

=== UFF in numbers ===
University rankings

Global – Overall
- ARWU World: 801-900 (2023)
- CWUR World: 967 (2024)
- CWTS World: 734 (2024)
- QS World: 1001-1200 (2025)
- THE World: 1501+ (2024)
- USNWR Global: 1,153 (2024)

Regional – Overall
- QS Latin America: 45 (2024)
- THE Latin America: 36 (2023)
- USNWR Latin America: 37 (2022)

Level, Students enrolled and Number of Courses
(A) Academic Graduate Programs
Master	Professional Master	Doctorate	Total
3,601 (62 courses)	1,218 (16 courses)	2,620 (42 courses)	7,439 (120 courses)
(B) Professional Graduate Programs
On-campus	Distance Learning	Medical Residency	Total
3,021 (143 courses)	11,517 (11 courses)	191 (45 courses)	14,729 (199 courses)
(C) Undergraduate Programs
On-campus	Distance Learning		Total
34,678 (124 courses)	8,950 (6 courses)		43,628 (130 courses)
(D) Schools
Elementary School	Middle School	High School	Total
60	243	87	390

== See also ==
- List of federal universities of Brazil
