= Rodrigo Noval de Oliveira =

Brazilian military officer, poet and writer

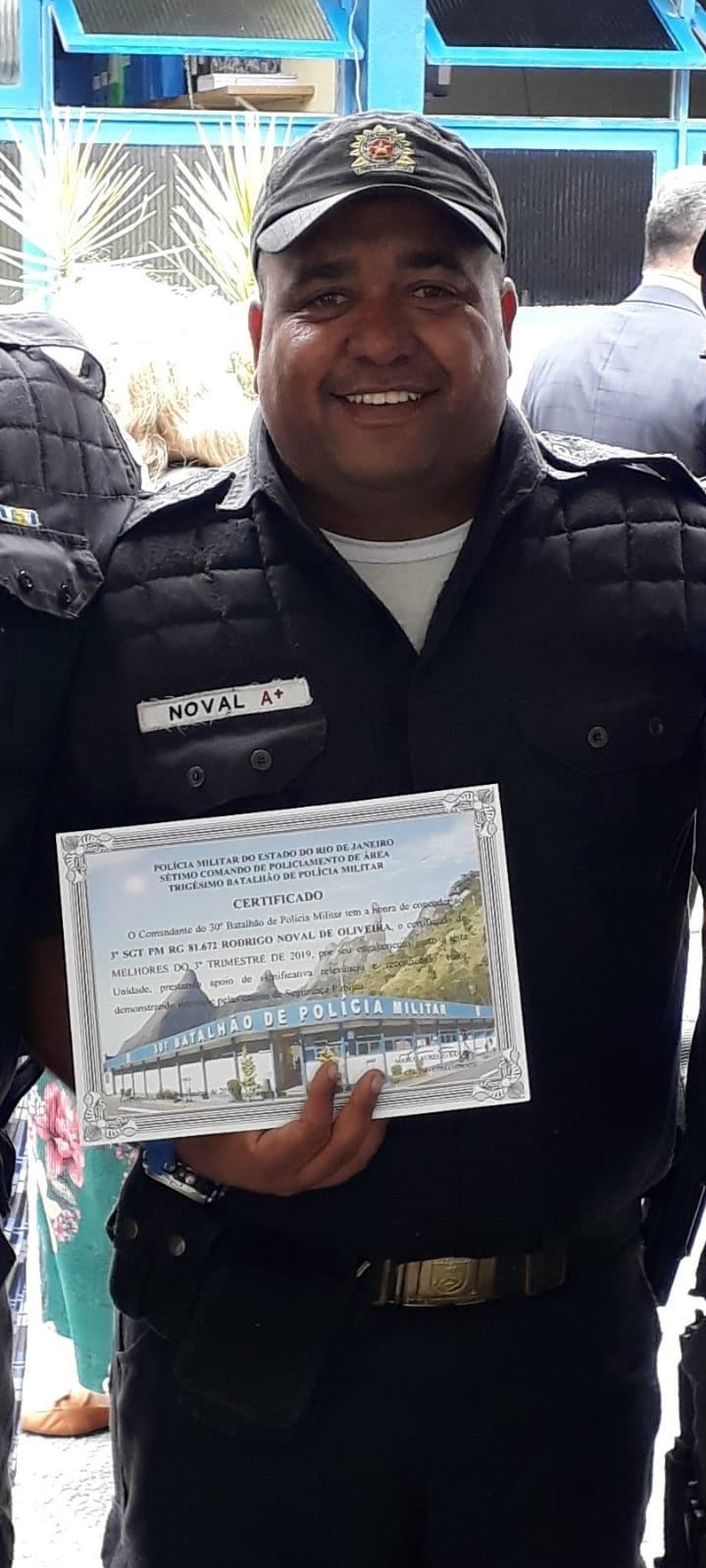
- Rodrigo Noval de Oliveira, holding the certification
- Born: September 25, 1978; Niterói
- Died: November 6, 2024 (aged 45); Tamoios, Cabo Frio
- Cause of death: shooting attack
- Citizenship: Brazilian
- Education: Rio de Janeiro State University
- Occupations: Police officer, official, writer, poet, sergeant
- Spouse: Claudia Danielle Labres Perrut

Rodrigo Noval de Oliveira (Niterói, 25 September 1978 – Cabo Frio, 6 November 2024) was a Brazilian military police officer, writer, and poet.

He distinguished himself both as a military and police officer and in literature, being honored in this capacity in 2022 by the Legislative Assembly of the State of Rio de Janeiro, among other honors. He was a member of the Friburguense Academy of Letters, in Nova Friburgo, where he lived, and was tipped to be the first black person to assume the presidency of the institution. He was shot and killed by criminals on November 6, 2024, in Cabo Frio, while visiting his son and granddaughter.

== Personal life ==
Rodrigo was born in Niterói on 25 September 1978, and has at least one sister, Valéria Noval.

He joined the Military Police of the State of Rio de Janeiro in 2005. In 2024, he was a second sergeant in the Military Police, assigned to the 30th Military Police Battalion in Teresópolis since 2017.

He had been married for the second time since 2015 to his wife Cláudia Danielle Labres Perrut Noval, leaving behind two children and two grandchildren from his first marriage.

== Literature ==
Rodrigo Noval published Chá de Poesia (Tea of Poetry) in 2011 by Livre Expressão publishing house.

He joined the Academy of Letters, Arts, and Sciences of Arraial do Cabo, being elected vice president of the institution for the 2013–2014 term.

In 2013, together with writer Marco Provazzi, he founded the first Literary Fair of Armação dos Búzios, launching his second book, Poesia Nua (Naked Poetry), here.

In 2017, he released his first book of short stories, Corpos Inversos, published by LP Books. He was working on a book titled Corações Devassos, Contos do Quotidiano, scheduled for release in November 2024, but this never happened because he was murdered.

He was a literary affiliate of writer Janaína da Cunha, great-granddaughter of Euclides da Cunha.

He joined the Friburguense Academy of Letters (AFL) in 2022 due to his works Chá de Poesia (Tea of Poetry) and Corpos Inversos (Inverse Bodies), being sworn in in April 2023 in seat number 21, patronymic of Inglês de Souza, previously occupied by Father João Martins Evangelho. Noval was the second black person to hold a seat at this institution in its nearly 76-year history. In 2024, he was first secretary of the AFL administration.

== Murder ==
On the night of 6 November 2024, in the Lakes Region, in Cabo Frio, district of Tamoios, Rodrigo Noval, driving a Fiat Siena, was intercepted on Tubarão Street, in the Aquarius neighborhood, by criminals who recognized him while he was visiting his daughter and grandson, and he was subsequently shot and killed. The criminals took Noval's car, which was located and recovered shortly afterwards.

Noval was buried on 8 November at the Trilha do Céu cemetery in the Conselheiro Paulino district of Nova Friburgo.

== Tributes ==
In 2022, he was recognized by the Nova Friburgo City Council for "his professionalism in the military and literary fields".

On 8 March of the same year, he was honored with a motion of Applause and Congratulations by the Legislative Assembly of the State of Rio de Janeiro (AELRJ) "for his outstanding services in the course of his military career and as a writer".

He was awarded for his book Chá de Poesia (Tea of Poetry) by Sapere publishing house, in an award ceremony for poets from Portugal, Brazil, and Mozambique.

On 22 November 2024, during a match against Fortaleza, Fluminense FC, the club of which Noval was a fan and supporter, posthumously honored the military man and writer by displaying his name on the electronic scoreboard at Maracanã Stadium.
