= Cardoso Moreira =

- Municipality
- Município de Cardoso Moreira
- Flag Coat of arms

- Location of Cardoso Moreira in the state of Rio de Janeiro

- Location of Cardoso Moreira in Brazil
- Coordinates: 21°29′16″S 41°36′57″W
- Country: Brazil
- Region: Southeast
- State: Rio de Janeiro

Government
  - Prefeito: Gilson Nunes Siqueira (PP)

Area
  - Total: 514.882 km^{2} (198.797 sq mi)
- Elevation: 27 m (89 ft)

Population (2020)
  - Total: 12,821
- Time zone: UTC-3 (UTC−3)

Cardoso Moreira (Portuguese pronunciation: [kɐʁˈdozu moˈɾe(j)ɾɐ]) is a municipality located in the Brazilian state of Rio de Janeiro. Its population was 12,821 (2020) and its area is 515 km^{2}.

== History ==
In 1672, Franciscan friars founded their first indigenous settlement in Cachoeiro, on the right bank of the Muriaé River. The Puris Indians, remnants of the Goitacá, who had been pursued by the Portuguese, are believed to have escaped successive migrations across the Muriaé River and taken shelter in the mission of the Franciscan priests. The foundation of the village, however, turned out to be fruitless, as it came to be affected by an epidemic fever.

At another time, by the end of 1700, more than 20 engenhos had already been installed in Cachoeiras do Muriaé (name by which the current municipality of Cardoso Moreira was called at that time). These mills used to grind sugar cane, process sugar and aguardente. These farmers needed a way to transport their production. In this way, they organized themselves for the construction of a railroad branch to Carangola, Minas Gerais.

Commander José Cardoso Moreira, in addition to making large investments in his lands, also made, as was customary at the time, several contributions to benefit the locality, becoming a major railroad shareholder. Probably due to the volume of its investments, the local station ended up being named after him, and later, so did the municipality.

=== Emancipation ===
With the emancipation of its former district neighbor, Italva, which also belonged to the municipality of Campos dos Goytacazes. The development brought about by the autonomy of its former neighboring district was witnessed, and in Cardoso Moreira, an emancipationist movement emerged, made official in 1986.

On July 31, 1988, the referral plebiscite finally reached the population of Cardoso Moreira, at the time called as "Dia do Sim". The final result of the election was mostly favorable to emancipation. This was made official on November 30, 1989 with the signing of State Law No. 1577, by the then Governor of the State of Rio de Janeiro Antônio Wellington Moreira Franco. Only in January 1993, however, did Cardoso Moreira finally achieve full autonomy with the end of the process against his emancipation.

== Sports ==
Founded in 1935, Cardoso Moreira Futebol Clube is the main sports team from the city. They played in the first division of the Campeonato Carioca only once, in 2008, being relegated at the end of the competition. Today, the club is licensed from professional football.
