= Ayrton Moreira =

Brazilian footballer and manager (1917-1975)

Personal information
- Full name: Ayrton Moreira
- Date of birth: 31 December 1917
- Place of birth: Miracema, Brazil
- Date of death: 22 November 1975 (aged 57)
- Place of death: Belo Horizonte, Brazil
- Position: Centre back

Senior career*
Years	Team	Apps	(Gls)
- Bonsucesso
1939	Atlético Mineiro		
- Aeroporto
- Botafogo
- Náutico

Managerial career
- 1946–1947: Metalusina
- 1948–1949: Bangu
- 1949: Atlético Mineiro
- Sport Juiz de Fora
- 1954: Villa Nova
- 1954–1955: Tupi
- 1956: América Mineiro
- 1957: Cruzeiro
- 1959: Atlético Mineiro
- 1964–1967: Cruzeiro
- 1968: Atlético Mineiro
- Bela Vista-MG
- Valeriodoce
- 1972: Vila Nova
- 1975: Cruzeiro (assistant)
- * Club domestic league appearances and goals

Ayrton Moreira (31 December 1917 – 22 November 1975), sometimes called Aírton Moreira, was a Brazilian football manager and former player who played as a central defender.

== Career ==
Born in Rio de Janeiro, Moreira made his senior debut with Bonsucesso before being sold to Atlético Mineiro in 1939. He subsequently played for Sport Club Aeroporto, Botafogo and Náutico before retiring in the 1940s.

Moreira began his career with Metalusina in 1946, before being named manager of Bangu for the 1948 season. In 1949, he also had a short stint at Atlético Mineiro before working at local sides Sport Juiz de Fora, Villa Nova and Tupi.

Moreira was in charge of América Mineiro in 1956, before taking over Cruzeiro in the following year. He returned to Atlético for a brief period in 1959, and subsequently worked at Cruzeiro in several roles.

In 1964, after the club dismissed Marão, Moreira was named manager of Cruzeiro's first team. He led the club to the 1966 Taça Brasil win over Pelé's Santos, but had to step down in November 1967 due to illness.

In 1968, Moreira was named Atlético Mineiro manager for a third period. He was subsequently in charge of Bela Vista-MG, Valeriodoce and Vila Nova before returning to Cruzeiro in 1975, but now as an assistant.

== Death ==
In November 1975, Moreira was hospitalized due to a hypertension which compromised his kidneys. He died on 22 November due to a intracerebral hemorrhage at the Hospital Felício Rocho in Belo Horizonte.

== Personal life ==
Moreira's older brothers Zezé and Aymoré were both footballers and managers. One of his other brothers, Aderbal, was a musician.

== Honours ==
=== Player ===
Atlético Mineiro

- Campeonato Mineiro: 1939

=== Manager ===
Cruzeiro

- Campeonato Mineiro: 1965, 1966, 1967
- Taça Brasil: 1966
