= Conselheiro Paulino =

Conselheiro Paulino is the 6th district of the municipality of Nova Friburgo in the state of Rio de Janeiro.

The district is made up of several neighborhoods, such as Alto do Catete, Fazenda da Laje, Floresta, Jardim Califórnia, Jardinlândia, Prado, Santa Teresinha, Santo André, São Jorge, and others.

== Name ==
The district was named in honor of Paulino José Soares de Sousa, known as Paulino de Sousa.

== History ==
Conselheiro Paulino was formed from lands carved out of the 1st, 2nd, and 4th districts and was established by Governor Amaral Peixoto through Law No. 1428 of January 1952; until then, it had been known as Fazenda da Ponte de Tábuas.

Conselheiro Paulino once had an extensive rail network that connected Nova Friburgo to the capital of Rio de Janeiro, the cities of Cantagalo and Itaocara, and the state of Minas Gerais. It was decommissioned in 1964.

== Economy ==
The top employer of this district is the Stam Metalúrgica. The company has more than 1,500 employees.

== Tourism ==
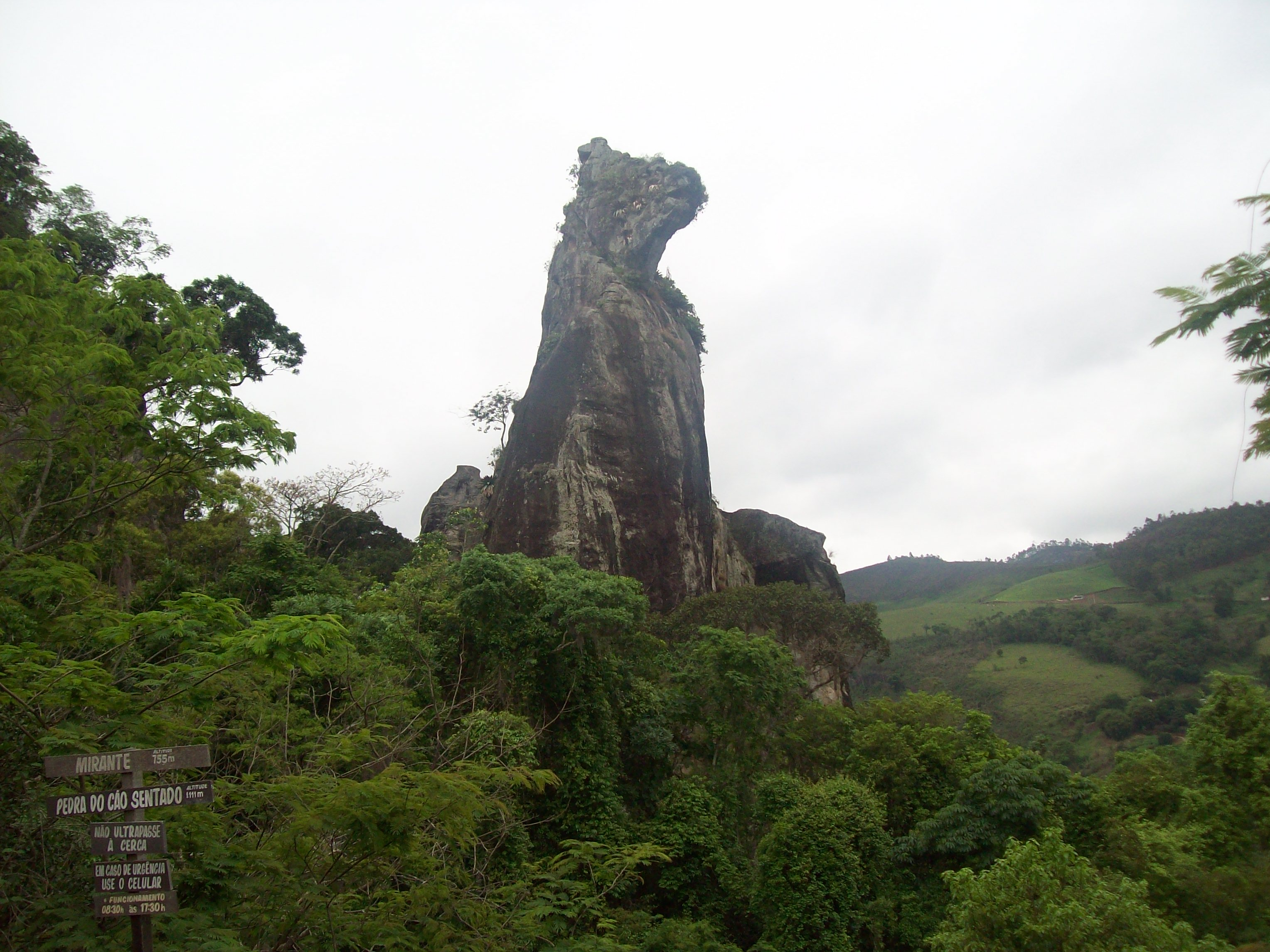
Pedra do Cão Sentado

The district is home to its main tourist attraction, the Cão Sentado, considered a symbol of the city of Nova Friburgo. Is located along the highway connecting Nova Friburgo to the municipality of Bom Jardim, with a height of 111 meters.
