= Aperibeense Futebol Clube =

Aperibeense
- Full name: Aperibeense Futebol Clube
- Founded: May 7, 1951 (73 years ago)
- Ground: Estádio José Gonçalves Brandão, Aperibé, Rio de Janeiro state, Brazil
- Capacity: 15,000
Home colours	Away colours

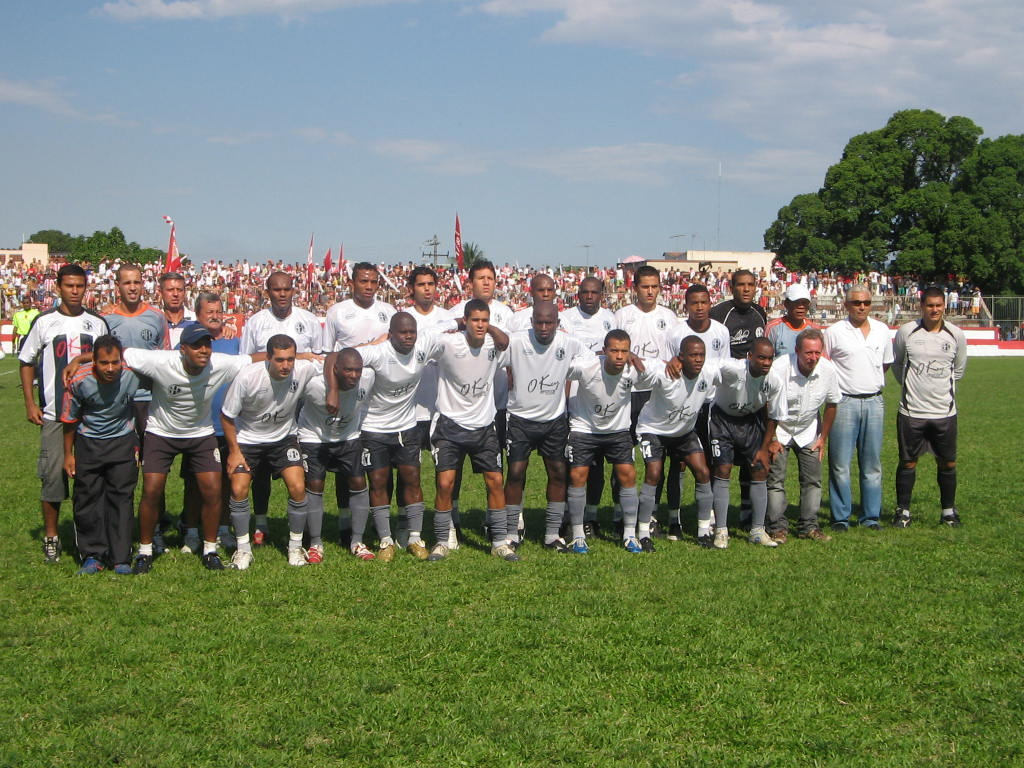
Team photo from the 2008 season

Aperibeense Futebol Clube, commonly known as Aperibeense, is a Brazilian football club based in Aperibé, Rio de Janeiro state.

== History ==
The club was founded on May 7, 1951. Aperibeense professionalized its football department in 2007, finished as the runners-up in the Campeonato Carioca Third level in the same year, losing the competition to Sendas Pão de Açúcar.

== Stadium ==
Aperibeense Futebol Clube play their home games at Estádio José Gonçalves Brandão. The stadium has a maximum capacity of 15,000 people.
