= São Sebastião do Alto =

- Municipality
- Município de São Sebastião do Alto
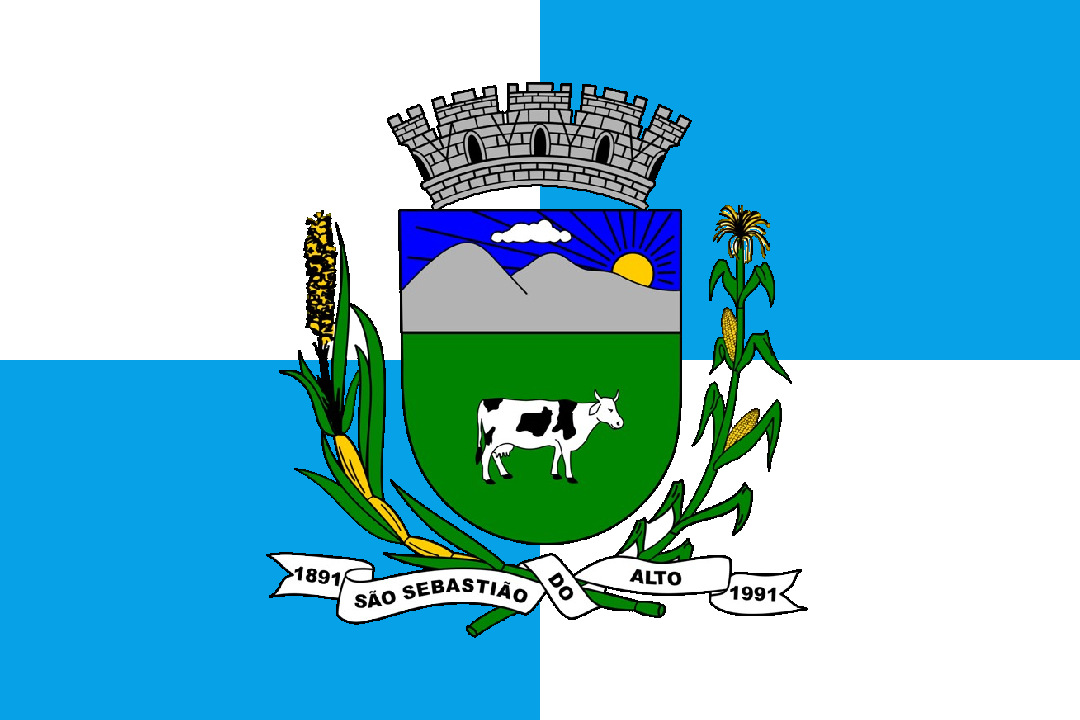
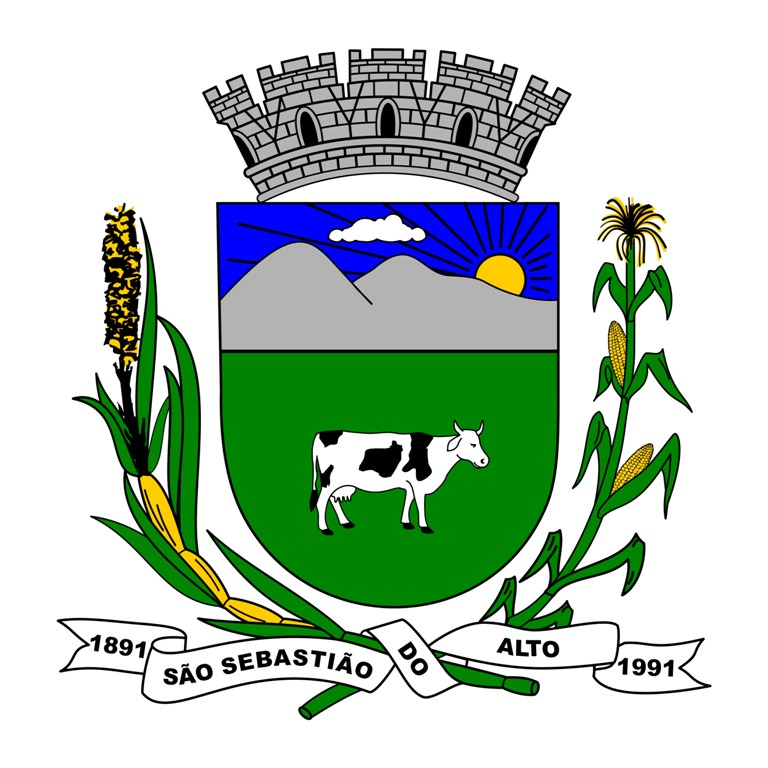
- Flag Coat of arms

- Location of São Sebastião do Alto in the state of Rio de Janeiro

- Location of São Sebastião do Alto in Brazil
- Coordinates: 21°57′25″S 42°08′06″W
- Country: Brazil
- Region: Southeast
- State: Rio de Janeiro

Government
  - Prefeito: Rosangela Pereira Borges do Amaral (PMDB)

Area
  - Total: 397.180 km^{2} (153.352 sq mi)
- Elevation: 575 m (1,886 ft)

Population (2020)
  - Total: 9,387
- Time zone: UTC−3 (BRT)

São Sebastião do Alto (Portuguese pronunciation: [sɐ̃w sebastʃiˈɐ̃w du ˈawtu]) is a municipality located in the Brazilian state of Rio de Janeiro. Its population was 9,387 (2020) and its area is 397 km^{2} (153 sq mi).
