= Tanguá =

- Municipality
- Município de Tanguá
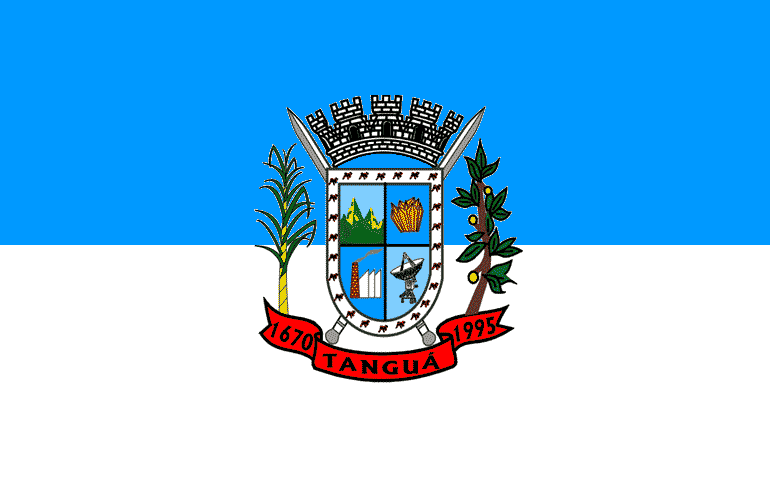
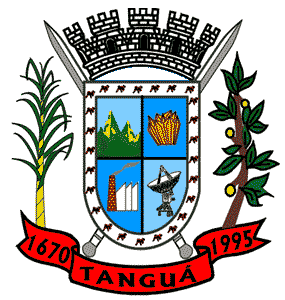
- Flag Coat of arms
- Nickname: Capital Pioneira das Telecomunicações
- Location of Tanguá in the state of Rio de Janeiro

- Location of Tanguá in Brazil
- Coordinates: 22°43′48″S 42°42′50″W
- Country: Brazil
- Region: Southeast
- State: Rio de Janeiro

Government
  - Prefeito: Anderson Pereira de Oliveira (Coroné Anderson)

Area
  - Total: 145,503 km^{2} (56,179 sq mi)
- Elevation: 20 m (66 ft)

Population (2020)
  - Total: 34,610
- Time zone: UTC−3 (BRT)

Tanguá (Portuguese pronunciation: [tɐ̃ˈgwa]) is a municipality located in the Brazilian state of Rio de Janeiro. It covers an area of 145.5 km^{2} (56.2 sq mi).

Its population is relatively stable, with 29,481 in 2005 and 30,732 in 2010, most of them urban. This equates to a population density of 211 inhabitants per km^{2}.

The municipality contains part of the Central Rio de Janeiro Atlantic Forest Mosaic of conservation units, created in 2006. It contains the 878 hectares (2,170 acres) Serra do Barbosão Municipal Nature Park, created in 2007 to protect an area of Atlantic Forest.
