= Juninho (footballer, born 21 April 1985) =

Brazilian footballer

Personal information
- Full name: Gilson Luís Pinheiro Júnior
- Date of birth: 21 April 1985 (age 41)
- Place of birth: Curitiba, Brazil
- Height: 1.80 m (5 ft 11 in)
- Position: Defensive midfielder

Team information
- Current team: FC Serrières

Youth career
- Corinthians

Senior career*
Years	Team	Apps	(Gls)
200?–2003	Corinthians		
2004–2006	FC Chiasso	61	(13)
2007	Perugia		
2008	FC Winterthur	6	(0)
2008	FC Kreuzlingen	5	(3)
2009	SC Zofingenn	10	(5)
2009–2010	FC Winterthur	13	(1)
2010–2011	FC Solothurn	17	(2)
2012–	FC Serrières		
- * Club domestic league appearances and goals as of 12 December 2011

Gilson Luís Pinheiro Júnior (born 21 April 1985), known as Juninho, is a Brazilian footballer who plays as midfielder for FC Serrières in the Swiss 2. Liga Interregional.

He replaced Juninho Santana and took his no.10 shirt at Swiss club FC Winterthur in January 2008.

He is the brother of Paquito.
