= Rio das Flores =

- Municipality
- Município de Rio das Flores
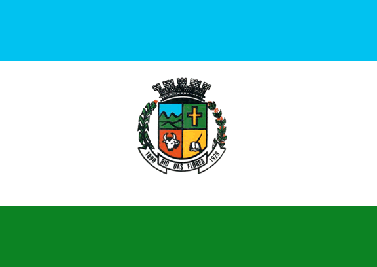
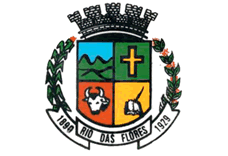
- Flag Coat of arms

- Location of Rio das Flores in the state of Rio de Janeiro

- Location of Rio das Flores in Brazil
- Coordinates: 22°10′04″S 43°35′09″W
- Country: Brazil
- Region: Southeast
- State: Rio de Janeiro

Government
  - Prefeito: Vicente de Paula de Souza Guedes (PPS)

Area
  - Total: 477.662 km^{2} (184.426 sq mi)
- Elevation: 525 m (1,722 ft)

Population (2020)
  - Total: 9,344
- Time zone: UTC−3 (BRT)
- Website: www.riodasflores.rj.gov.br

Rio das Flores (Portuguese pronunciation: [ˈʁi.u dɐs ˈfloɾis]) is a municipality located in the Brazilian state of Rio de Janeiro. Its population was 9,344 (2020) and its area is 478 km^{2}.

== History ==
Before the arrival of the first Portuguese settlers in the 16th century, the region was inhabited by the Purí people. The region began to be colonized more intensively on the 19th century, during the “Coffee cycle”. In 1851, a chapel was built dedicated to Santa Teresa, establishing the Parish of Santa Teresa of Valenca. With the coffee plantation, the region began to become very prosperous, to the point that in 1882, a railway station was opened in Rio das Flores to serve the coffee farms.

In 1890, the district emancipated from city of Valencia, becoming the village of Santa Teresa. In 1929 the village was elevated to city status and in 1943, was renamed "City of Rio das Flores." Currently, it has its economy based on agriculture and tourism.

== Tourism in Rio das Flores ==
- Historic Coffee Farms: In the early 19th century, the Paraiba Valley and Rio das Flores was just becoming a centerpiece of what has come to be known in Brazilian history as the “coffee cycle”. Visiting a historical coffee farm you will hear about powerful barons, strong slaves and demanding ladies in their beautiful homes. You can have lunch in a farm built in the early 1800s and visit the a historic farm with over 300 windows.
- Eco-tourism: The beautiful mountains in the Rio das Flores region is a sideshow, with waterfalls, flora and fauna, unique landscapes, plus the Fazenda do Bananal beautiful trails into the tropical forest where you can see toucans, parrots and other exotic birds as well as the native fauna.
- Cultural Festivals: Culinary, history and culture come together in Coffee, Cachaça and Chorinho annual festival and tour of attractions in the Paraiba River Valley in Rio de Janeiro State.
- Sports Tourism: Besides exploring the local historic attractions, Rio das Flores hosts and sponsors several Sports Events that has achieved regional and national reputation such as Copa Rio das Flores de Futebol, Copa Vale do Café de Motocross, Motorcycle Annual Meeting and other.
