= Iguaba Grande =

- Municipality
- Município de Iguaba Grande
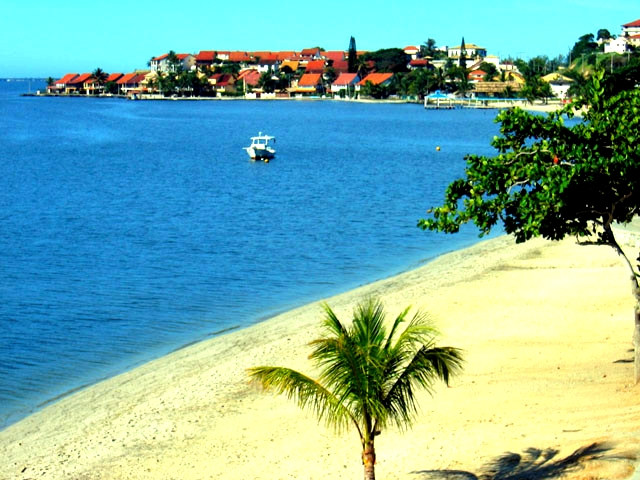
- Araruama Lagoon

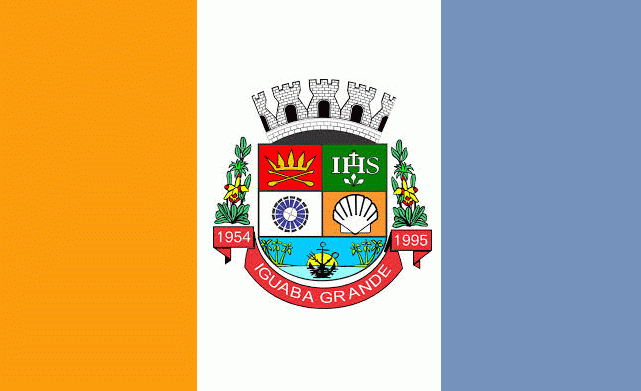
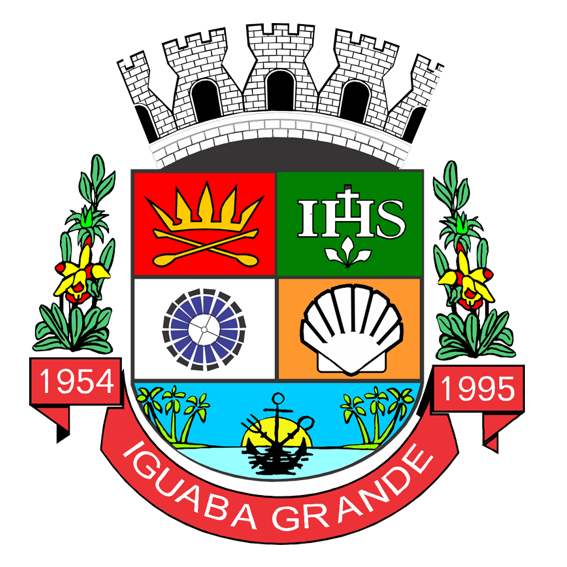
- Flag Coat of arms
- Motto: "A melhor cidade para todas as idades"
- Location of Iguaba Grande in the state of Rio de Janeiro

- Location of Iguaba Grande in Brazil
- Coordinates: 22°50′20″S 42°13′44″W
- Country: Brazil
- Region: Southeast
- State: Rio de Janeiro

Government
  - Mayor: Fabinho (2025-2028)(Cidadania)

Area
  - Total: 53.601 km^{2} (20.695 sq mi)
- Elevation: 18 m (59 ft)

Population (2020)
  - Total: 28,837
- Time zone: UTC-3 (UTC-3)

Iguaba Grande (Portuguese pronunciation: [iˈgwabɐ ˈgɾɐ̃dʒi]) is a municipality located in the Brazilian state of Rio de Janeiro. Its population was 28,837 (2020) and its area is 54 km^{2} (21 sq mi).

== Climate ==
Climate data for Iguaba Grande (1991–2020)
Month	Jan	Feb	Mar	Apr	May	Jun	Jul	Aug	Sep	Oct	Nov	Dec	Year
Mean daily maximum °C (°F)	31.5 (88.7)	32.2 (90.0)	30.9 (87.6)	29.4 (84.9)	27.0 (80.6)	26.4 (79.5)	26.0 (78.8)	26.5 (79.7)	26.8 (80.2)	27.9 (82.2)	28.5 (83.3)	30.3 (86.5)	28.6 (83.5)
Daily mean °C (°F)	26.6 (79.9)	27.0 (80.6)	26.2 (79.2)	25.0 (77.0)	22.6 (72.7)	21.8 (71.2)	21.5 (70.7)	21.9 (71.4)	22.4 (72.3)	23.5 (74.3)	24.3 (75.7)	25.8 (78.4)	24.1 (75.4)
Mean daily minimum °C (°F)	23.3 (73.9)	23.7 (74.7)	23.1 (73.6)	21.7 (71.1)	19.3 (66.7)	18.3 (64.9)	17.8 (64.0)	18.3 (64.9)	19.2 (66.6)	20.5 (68.9)	21.2 (70.2)	22.6 (72.7)	20.8 (69.4)
Average precipitation mm (inches)	103.6 (4.08)	61.0 (2.40)	109.4 (4.31)	65.3 (2.57)	74.8 (2.94)	40.6 (1.60)	52.8 (2.08)	35.5 (1.40)	62.0 (2.44)	64.6 (2.54)	112.1 (4.41)	111.6 (4.39)	893.3 (35.17)
Average precipitation days (≥ 1.0 mm)	8	6	8	6	7	5	6	5	7	8	10	9	85
Average relative humidity (%)	75.6	73.9	77.3	78.0	78.3	77.6	76.8	75.4	75.9	76.6	78.1	77.7	76.8
Mean monthly sunshine hours	234.1	237.1	218.3	212.8	195.1	197.1	203.6	210.5	176.6	185.3	175.4	205.5	2,451.4
Source: Instituto Nacional de Meteorologia
