= Macuco =

- Municipality
- Município de Macuco
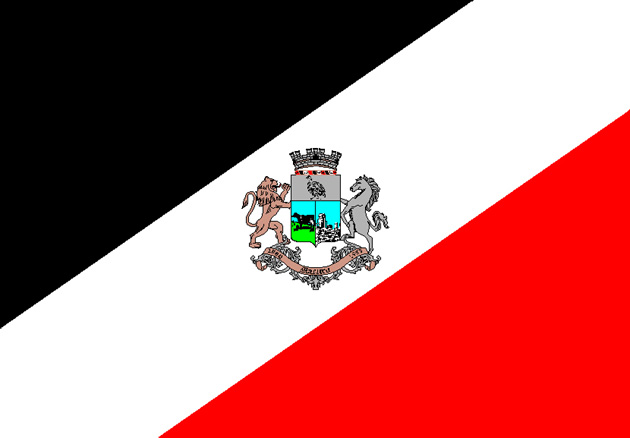
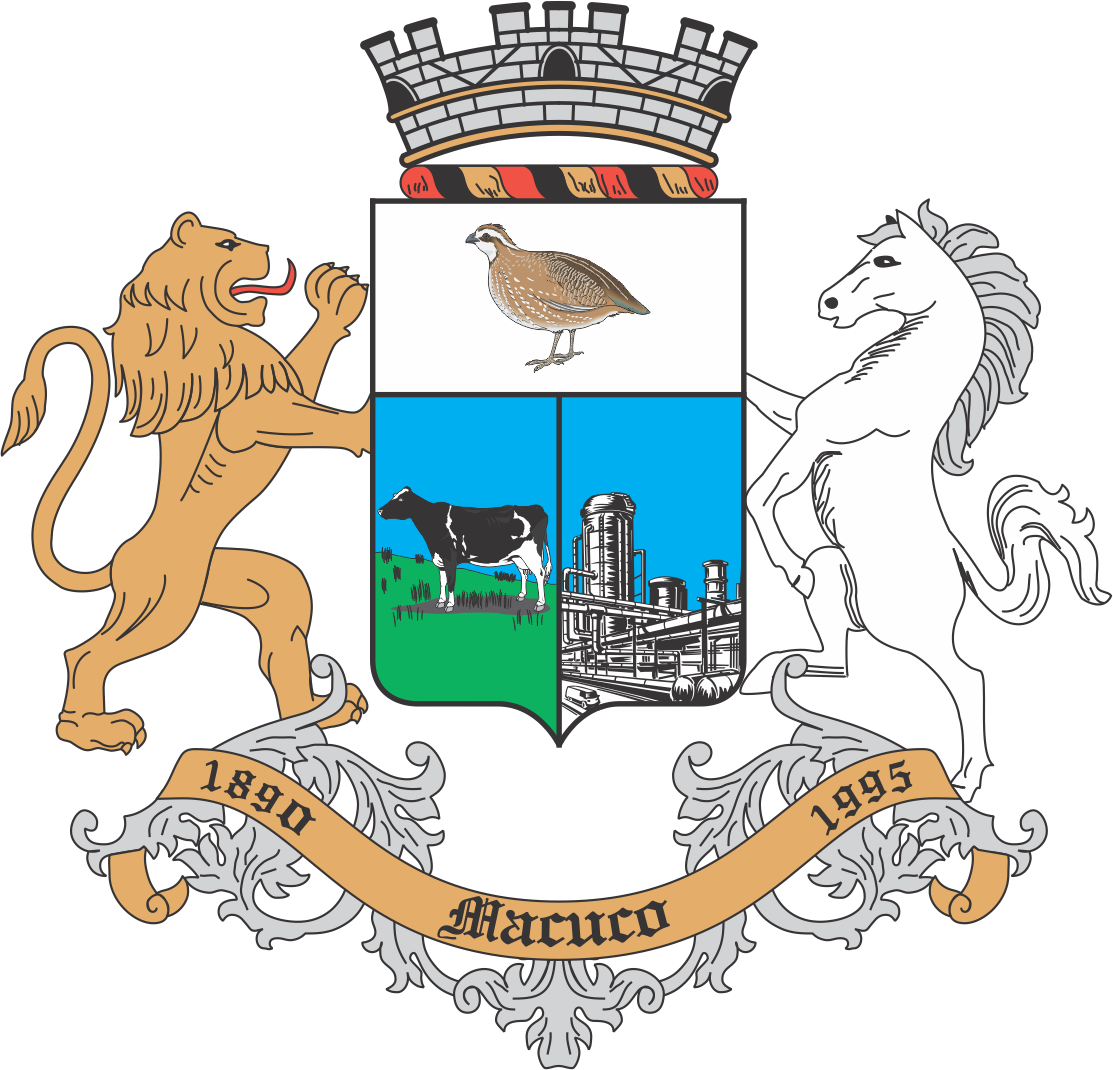
- Flag Coat of arms
- Nicknames: Highland princess Milk capital
- Location of Macuco in the state of Rio de Janeiro

- Location of Macuco in Brazil
- Coordinates: 21°59′02″S 42°15′10″W
- Country: Brazil
- Region: Southeast
- State: Rio de Janeiro

Government
  - Prefeito: Bruno Boaretto (PHS)

Area
  - Total: 77.080 km^{2} (29.761 sq mi)
- Elevation: 266 m (873 ft)

Population (2020)
  - Total: 5,623
- Time zone: UTC-3 (UTC-3)

Macuco (Portuguese pronunciation: [mɐˈkuku]) is a municipality located in the Brazilian state of Rio de Janeiro. Its population was 5,623 (2020) and its area is 77 km^{2} (30 sq mi).
