= Aymoré Moreira =

Brazilian footballer and manager (1912-1998)

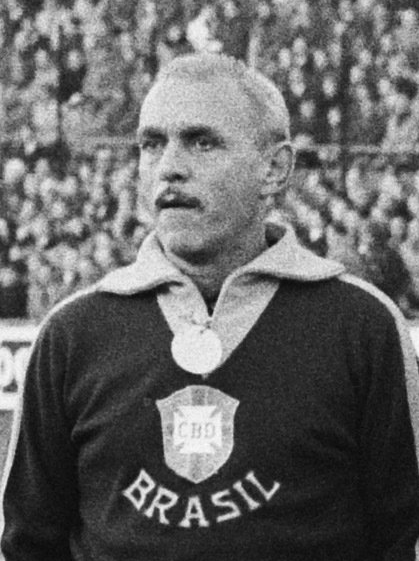
- Aymoré Moreira, May 1963

Personal information
- Date of birth: 24 April 1912
- Place of birth: Miracema, Brazil
- Date of death: 26 July 1998 (aged 86)
- Place of death: Salvador Bahia, Brazil
- Height: 1.72 m (5 ft 8 in)
- Position: Goalkeeper

Senior career*
Years	Team	Apps	(Gls)
1932–1933	América (RJ)		
1934–1935	Palestra Itália		
1936–1941	Botafogo	412	(0)
1941	Fluminense		
1941–1946	Botafogo		

International career
1932–1942	Brazil	32	(0)

Managerial career
- 1948–1949: Olaria
- 1950: Bangu
- 1951: São Cristóvão
- 1951–1952: Palmeiras
- 1952: Santos
- 1953: Portuguesa
- 1953: São Paulo
- 1953: Brazil
- 1954–1957: Palmeiras
- 1961–1963: Brazil
- 1962: São Paulo
- 1962–1966: Portuguesa
- 1966–1967: São Paulo
- 1967: Palmeiras
- 1967–1968: Flamengo
- 1967–1968: Brazil
- 1968: Corinthians
- 1969–1970: Portuguesa
- 1970–1971: Corinthians
- 1972–1974: Boavista
- 1974–1975: Porto
- 1975–1976: Panathinaikos
- 1977: Botafogo
- 1977: Ferroviária
- 1977–1978: Cruzeiro
- 1979: Vitória
- 1981–1982: Bahia
- 1983: Galícia
- 1984: Catuense
Medal record
Representing Brazil (As manager)
FIFA World Cup
Winner	1962 Chile
- * Club domestic league appearances and goals

Aymoré Moreira (24 April 1912 – 26 July 1998) was a Brazilian football player and coach, who played as a goalkeeper. He was a brother of Zezé Moreira and Ayrton Moreira, both of whom were also successful coaches in Brazilian football.

== Career ==
Moreira was born in Miracema, Rio de Janeiro. He began his career as a right-winger, but soon he changed to become a goalkeeper, playing for América, Palestra Itália and Botafogo, where he remained from 1936 to 1946 and earned call-ups to the Brazil national team, the "Canarinho" (Portuguese of Little Canary).

After his retirement as a player, he became a successful coach, leading Brazil to its second FIFA World Cup in 1962. In the first match against Mexico, Pelé assisted on the first goal and scored the second one, later injuring himself while attempting a long-range shot against Czechoslovakia. This kept him out of the remainder of the tournament and forced Moreira to make his only lineup change of the tournament; bringing in Amarildo. The replacement duly scored in the final, a rematch against Czechoslovakia. Garrincha starred in the 3–1 win.

Moreira managed Brazil national team for 61 matches, with 37 wins, 9 draws and 15 losses. Besides winning the World Cup, he led the "Canarinha" to win the Taça Oswaldo Cruz in 1961 and 1962, Taça Bernardo O'Higgins in 1961 and 1966, Roca Cup in 1963 and Taça Rio Branco in 1967.

Among the clubs he coached were Bangu, Palmeiras, Portuguesa, Botafogo, São Paulo, Galícia and Panathinaikos.

Moreira died in Salvador, Bahia, aged 86.

== Managerial statistics ==
Team	Nation	From	To	Record				
Team	Nation	From	To	G	W	D	L	Win %
Brazil	Brazil	1 March 1953	1 April 1953	7	4	0	3	57.14
Palmeiras	Brazil	1954	1957	124	61	25	38	49.19
Brazil	Brazil	30 April 1961	22 May 1963	40	25	5	10	62.5
São Paulo	Brazil	1962	1962	37	21	9	7	56.76
Portuguesa	Brazil	1963	1966	118	49	32	37	41.53
Brazil	Brazil	25 June 1967	1 July 1967	3	0	3	0	0
Flamengo	Brazil	1967	1968	20	7	3	10	35
Corinthians	Brazil	1968	1968	42	24	6	12	57.14
FC Porto	Portugal	August 1974	March 1975	27	15	4	8	55.56
Panathinaikos	Greece	May 1975	May 1976	37	18	11	8	48.65
Vitória	Brazil	1979	1979	58	30	14	14	51.72
Total				513	274	112	147	53.41

== Honours ==
=== Player ===
Palmeiras

- Campeonato Paulista: 1934

Botafogo

- Torneio Início Carioca: 1938

=== Manager ===
Palmeiras

- Torneio Roberto Gomes Pedrosa: 1967

Corinthans

- Torneio do Povo: 1971

Brazil

- FIFA World Cup: 1962
- Taça Oswaldo Cruz: 1961, 1962
- Taça Bernardo O'Higgins: 1961, 1966
- Copa Roca: 1963
- Taça Rio Branco: 1967
