= Mendes, Rio de Janeiro =

Mendes
- Municipality
- Município de Mendes
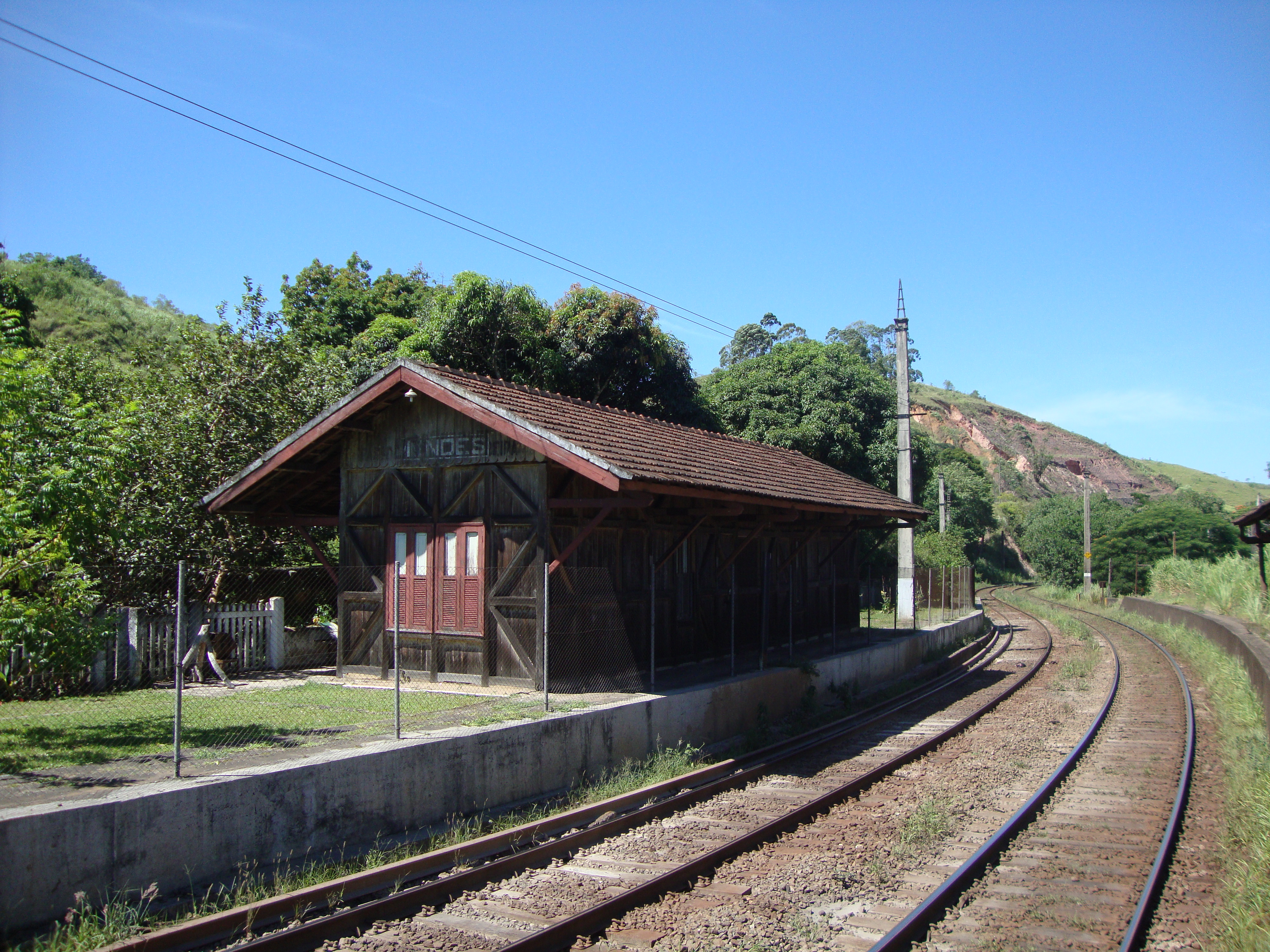
- Railway Station

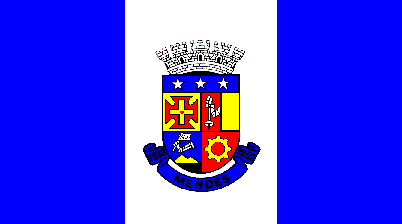
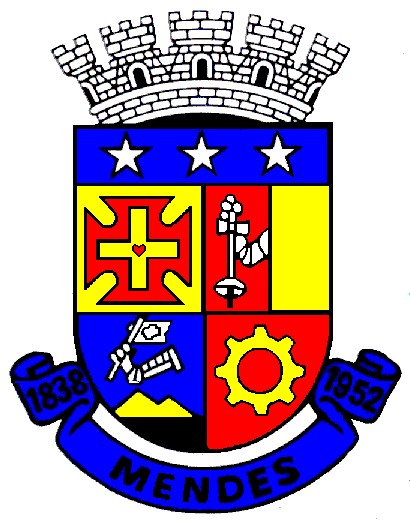
- Flag Coat of arms

- Location of Mendes in the state of Rio de Janeiro

- Location of Mendes in Brazil
- Coordinates: 22°31′37″S 43°43′58″W
- Country: Brazil
- Region: Southeast
- State: Rio de Janeiro

Government
  - Prefeito: Rogério Riente (PP)

Area
  - Total: 96.300 km^{2} (37.182 sq mi)
- Elevation: 395 m (1,296 ft)

Population (2020)
  - Total: 18,648
- Time zone: UTC-3 (UTC-3)

Mendes (Portuguese pronunciation: [ˈmẽdʒis]) is a municipality located in the Brazilian state of Rio de Janeiro. Its population was 18,648 (2020) and its area is 96 km^{2} (37 sq mi).
