= List of municipalities in Rio de Janeiro =

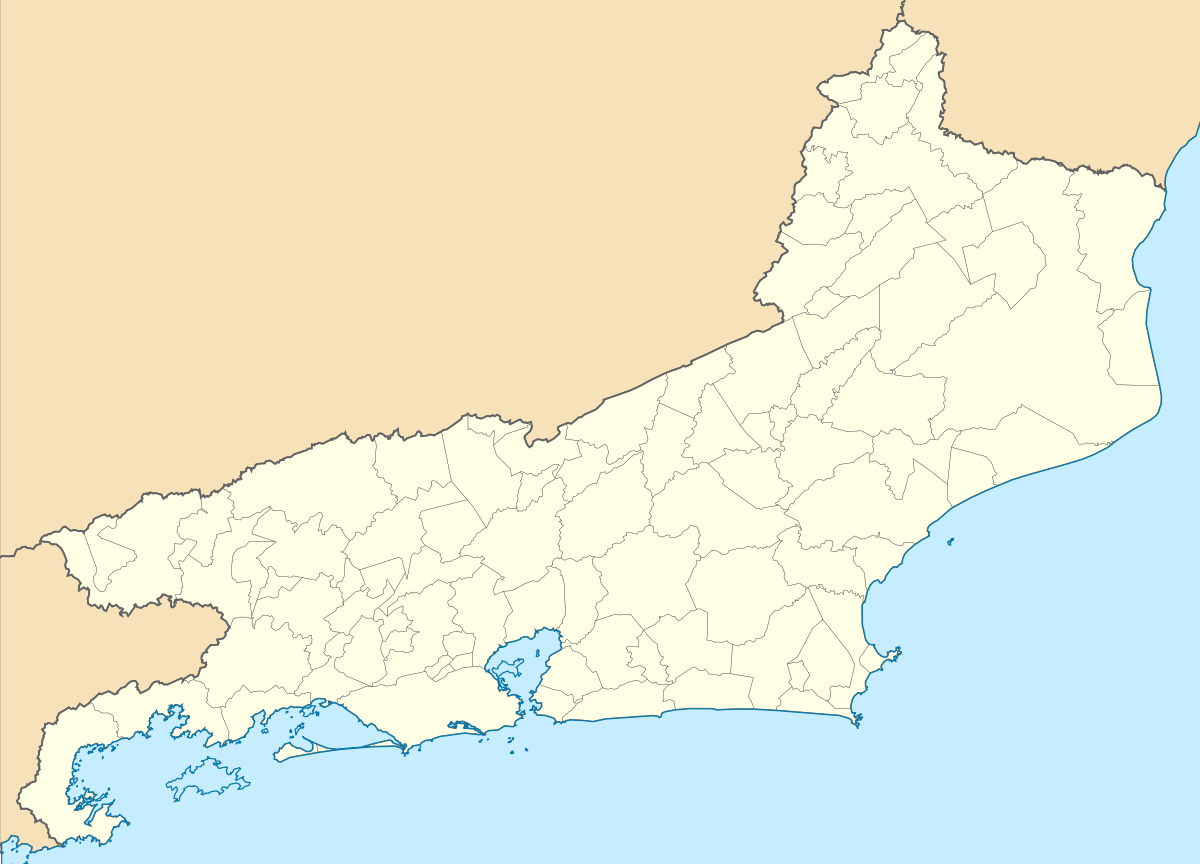
Municipalities of Rio de Janeiro, Brazil. See table for key. (Note: The map excludes Mesquita, which is north of Nilópolis (46))

Rio de Janeiro is a state in southeast Brazil that is divided into 92 municipalities. According to the 2022 IBGE Census, it is the third most populous state with 16,055,174 inhabitants and the twenty-fourth smallest by land area spanning 43,750.424 square kilometres (16,892.133 sq mi).

Each municipalities has its own seat, called a city, and may also be divided into smaller units called districts, whose seats are called towns. Municipalities enjoys political autonomy and are governed by an organic law; however, unlike the federal government and the states, they don't have a judicial branch, and are governed solely by a mayor and a city council, which constitute the executive and legislative branches, respectively.

The largest municipality by population is the state capital Rio de Janeiro, with 6.211.223 residents, while the smallest is Macuco with 5.415 residents. The largest municipality by land area is Campos dos Goytacazes which spans 4,032.49 km^{2} (1,556.95 sq mi) and the smallest is Nilópolis with 19.39 km^{2} (7.49 sq mi) The newest municipality is Mesquita, established in 2001.

== List ==
Mesoregion	Microregion	Municipality	Population (2022)	Area (km²)
Baixadas	Bacia de São João	Casimiro de Abreu	46,110	462
Baixadas	Bacia de São João	Rio das Ostras	156,491	228
Baixadas	Bacia de São João	Silva Jardim	21,352	937
Baixadas	Lagos	Araruama	129,671	633
Baixadas	Lagos	Armação dos Búzios	40,006	70
Baixadas	Lagos	Arraial do Cabo	30,986	152
Baixadas	Lagos	Cabo Frio	222,161	410
Baixadas	Lagos	Iguaba Grande	27,920	53
Baixadas	Lagos	São Pedro da Aldeia	104,029	332
Baixadas	Lagos	Saquarema	89,559	352
Centro Fluminense	Cantagalo-Cordeiro	Cantagalo	19,390	747
Centro Fluminense	Cantagalo-Cordeiro	Carmo	17,198	305
Centro Fluminense	Cantagalo-Cordeiro	Cordeiro	20,783	113
Centro Fluminense	Cantagalo-Cordeiro	Macuco	5,415	78
Centro Fluminense	Nova Friburgo	Bom Jardim	28,102	382
Centro Fluminense	Nova Friburgo	Duas Barras	10,980	379
Centro Fluminense	Nova Friburgo	Nova Friburgo	189,939	935
Centro Fluminense	Nova Friburgo	Sumidouro	15,206	413
Centro Fluminense	Santa Maria Madalena	Santa Maria Madalena	10,232	810
Centro Fluminense	Santa Maria Madalena	São Sebastião do Alto	7,750	397
Centro Fluminense	Santa Maria Madalena	Trajano de Morais	10,302	591
Centro Fluminense	Três Rios	Areal	11,828	110
Centro Fluminense	Três Rios	Comendador Levy Gasparian	8,741	108
Centro Fluminense	Três Rios	Paraíba do Sul	42,063	571
Centro Fluminense	Três Rios	Sapucaia	17,729	540
Centro Fluminense	Três Rios	Três Rios	78,346	322
Metropolitana do Rio de Janeiro	Itaguaí	Itaguaí	116,841	282
Metropolitana do Rio de Janeiro	Itaguaí	Mangaratiba	41,220	367
Metropolitana do Rio de Janeiro	Itaguaí	Seropédica	80,596	265
Metropolitana do Rio de Janeiro	Macacu-Caceribu	Cachoeiras de Macacu	56,943	954
Metropolitana do Rio de Janeiro	Macacu-Caceribu	Rio Bonito	56,276	459
Metropolitana do Rio de Janeiro	Rio de Janeiro	Belford Roxo	483,087	78
Metropolitana do Rio de Janeiro	Rio de Janeiro	Duque de Caxias	808,161	467
Metropolitana do Rio de Janeiro	Rio de Janeiro	Guapimirim	51,696	358
Metropolitana do Rio de Janeiro	Rio de Janeiro	Itaboraí	224,267	429
Metropolitana do Rio de Janeiro	Rio de Janeiro	Japeri	96,289	81
Metropolitana do Rio de Janeiro	Rio de Janeiro	Magé	228,127	390
Metropolitana do Rio de Janeiro	Rio de Janeiro	Maricá	197,277	261
Metropolitana do Rio de Janeiro	Rio de Janeiro	Nilópolis	146,774	19
Metropolitana do Rio de Janeiro	Rio de Janeiro	Niterói	481,749	133
Metropolitana do Rio de Janeiro	Rio de Janeiro	Mesquita	167,127	41
Metropolitana do Rio de Janeiro	Rio de Janeiro	Nova Iguaçu	785,867	520
Metropolitana do Rio de Janeiro	Rio de Janeiro	Queimados	140,523	75
Metropolitana do Rio de Janeiro	Rio de Janeiro	Rio de Janeiro (State Capital)	6,211,223	1200
Metropolitana do Rio de Janeiro	Rio de Janeiro	São Gonçalo	896,744	248
Metropolitana do Rio de Janeiro	Rio de Janeiro	São João de Meriti	440,962	35
Metropolitana do Rio de Janeiro	Rio de Janeiro	Tanguá	31,086	143
Metropolitana do Rio de Janeiro	Serrana	Petrópolis	278,881	791
Metropolitana do Rio de Janeiro	Serrana	São José do Vale do Rio Preto	22,080	220
Metropolitana do Rio de Janeiro	Serrana	Teresópolis	165,123	773
Metropolitana do Rio de Janeiro	Vassouras	Engenheiro Paulo de Frontin	12,242	139
Metropolitana do Rio de Janeiro	Vassouras	Mendes	17,502	95
Metropolitana do Rio de Janeiro	Vassouras	Miguel Pereira	26,933	287
Metropolitana do Rio de Janeiro	Vassouras	Paracambi	41,375	190
Metropolitana do Rio de Janeiro	Vassouras	Paty do Alferes	29,619	314
Metropolitana do Rio de Janeiro	Vassouras	Vassouras	33,976	536
Noroeste Fluminense	Itaperuna	Bom Jesus do Itabapoana	35,173	596
Noroeste Fluminense	Itaperuna	Italva	14,073	291
Noroeste Fluminense	Itaperuna	Itaperuna	101,041	1106
Noroeste Fluminense	Itaperuna	Laje do Muriaé	7,336	253
Noroeste Fluminense	Itaperuna	Natividade	15,074	387
Noroeste Fluminense	Itaperuna	Porciúncula	17,288	291
Noroeste Fluminense	Itaperuna	Varre-Sai	10,207	201
Noroeste Fluminense	Santo Antônio de Pádua	Aperibé	11,034	94
Noroeste Fluminense	Santo Antônio de Pádua	Cambuci	14,616	558
Noroeste Fluminense	Santo Antônio de Pádua	Itaocara	22,919	433
Noroeste Fluminense	Santo Antônio de Pádua	Miracema	26,881	303
Noroeste Fluminense	Santo Antônio de Pádua	Santo Antônio de Pádua	41,325	603
Noroeste Fluminense	Santo Antônio de Pádua	São José de Ubá	7,070	249
Norte Fluminense	Campos dos Goytacazes	Campos dos Goytacazes	483,540	4032
Norte Fluminense	Campos dos Goytacazes	Cardoso Moreira	12,958	522
Norte Fluminense	Campos dos Goytacazes	São Fidélis	38,961	1034
Norte Fluminense	Campos dos Goytacazes	São Francisco de Itabapoana	45,059	1118
Norte Fluminense	Campos dos Goytacazes	São João da Barra	36,573	452
Norte Fluminense	Macaé	Carapebus	13,847	304
Norte Fluminense	Macaé	Conceição de Macabu	21,104	338
Norte Fluminense	Macaé	Macaé	246,391	1216
Norte Fluminense	Macaé	Quissamã	22,393	719
Sul Fluminense	Baía da Ilha Grande	Angra dos Reis	167,434	813
Sul Fluminense	Baía da Ilha Grande	Paraty	45,243	924
Sul Fluminense	Barra do Piraí	Barra do Piraí	92,883	584
Sul Fluminense	Barra do Piraí	Rio das Flores	8,954	478
Sul Fluminense	Barra do Piraí	Valença	68,088	1300
Sul Fluminense	Vale do Paraíba Fluminense	Barra Mansa	169,894	547
Sul Fluminense	Vale do Paraíba Fluminense	Itatiaia	30,908	241
Sul Fluminense	Vale do Paraíba Fluminense	Pinheiral	24,298	82
Sul Fluminense	Vale do Paraíba Fluminense	Piraí	27,474	490
Sul Fluminense	Vale do Paraíba Fluminense	Porto Real	20,373	50
Sul Fluminense	Vale do Paraíba Fluminense	Quatis	13,682	284
Sul Fluminense	Vale do Paraíba Fluminense	Resende	129,612	1099
Sul Fluminense	Vale do Paraíba Fluminense	Rio Claro	17,401	846
Sul Fluminense	Vale do Paraíba Fluminense	Volta Redonda	261,563	182

== See also ==
- Geography of Brazil
- List of cities in Brazil
- Gallery of flags of municipalities of Rio de Janeiro
