= Itaperuna Airport =

Ernani do Amaral Peixoto Airport Aeroporto Ernani do Amaral Peixoto

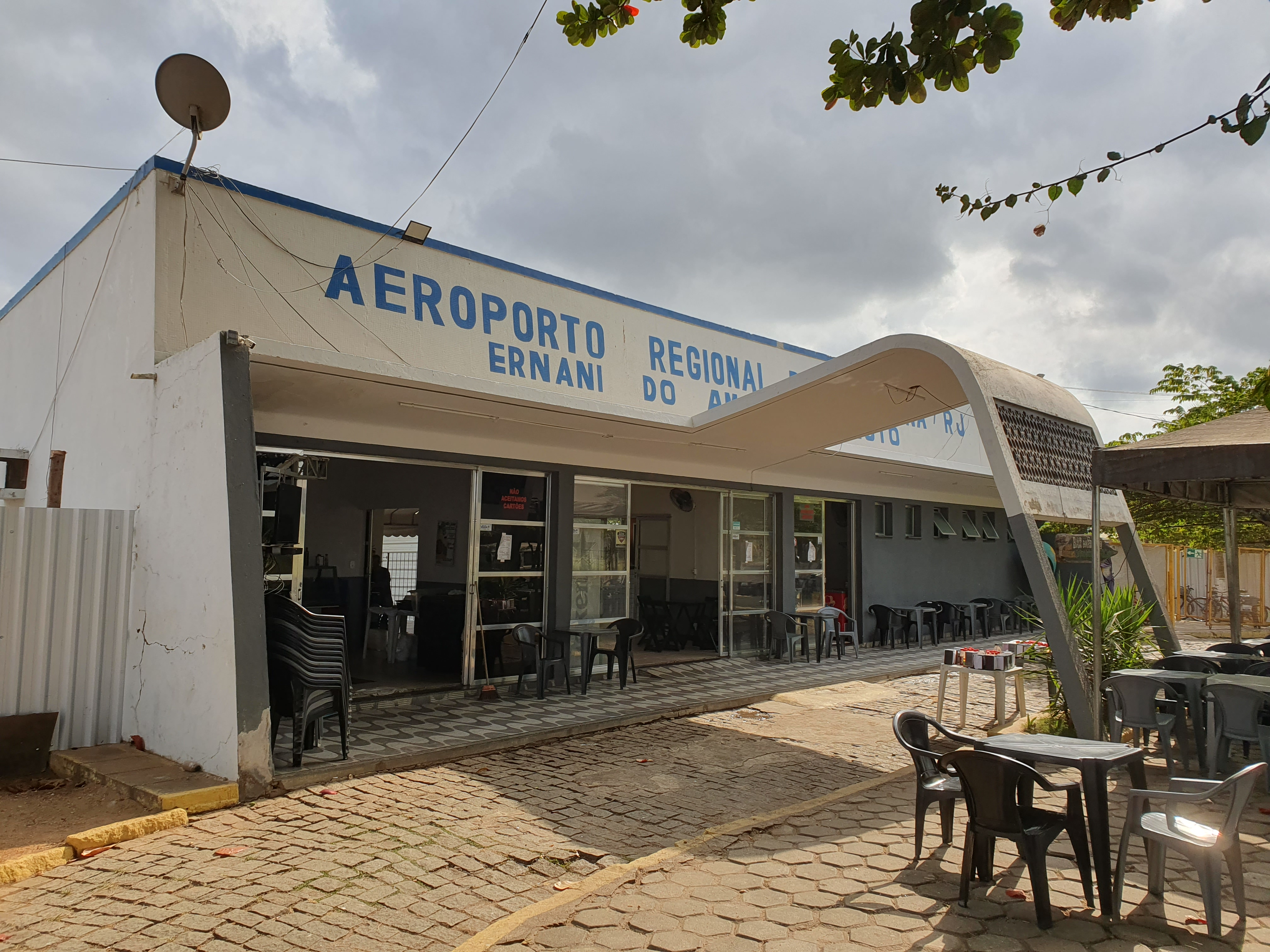
- Itaperuna airport landside in 2024
- IATA: ITP; ICAO: SDUN; LID: RJ0008

Summary
- Airport type: Public
- Operator: Infraero (2024–present)
- Serves: Itaperuna
- Opened: 8 August 1954; 72 years ago
- Time zone: BRT (UTC−03:00)
- Elevation AMSL: 110 m (360 ft)
- Coordinates: 21°13′09″S 041°52′33″W
- Website: www4.infraero.gov.br/aeroporto-de-itaperuna/

Map
- Location in Brazil ITP (Brazil)

Runways
| Direction | Length | | Surface |
| Direction | m | ft | Surface |
|---|---|---|---|
| 06/24 | 1,200 | 3,937 | Asphalt |

Statistics (2025)
- Passengers: 583
- Aircraft Operations: 461
- Metric tonnes of cargo: 0
- Statistics: Infraero; Sources: Airport Website, ANAC, DECEA

Ernani do Amaral Peixoto Airport (IATA: ITP, ICAO: SDUN), is the airport serving Itaperuna, Brazil.

It is operated by Infraero.

== History ==
The airport was commissioned on August 8, 1954. Previously, the area was occupied by an air-club.

On January 2, 2024, the Municipality of Itaperuna signed a contract of operation with Infraero.

== Access ==
The airport is located 4 km (2 mi) from downtown Itaperuna.

== Gallery ==
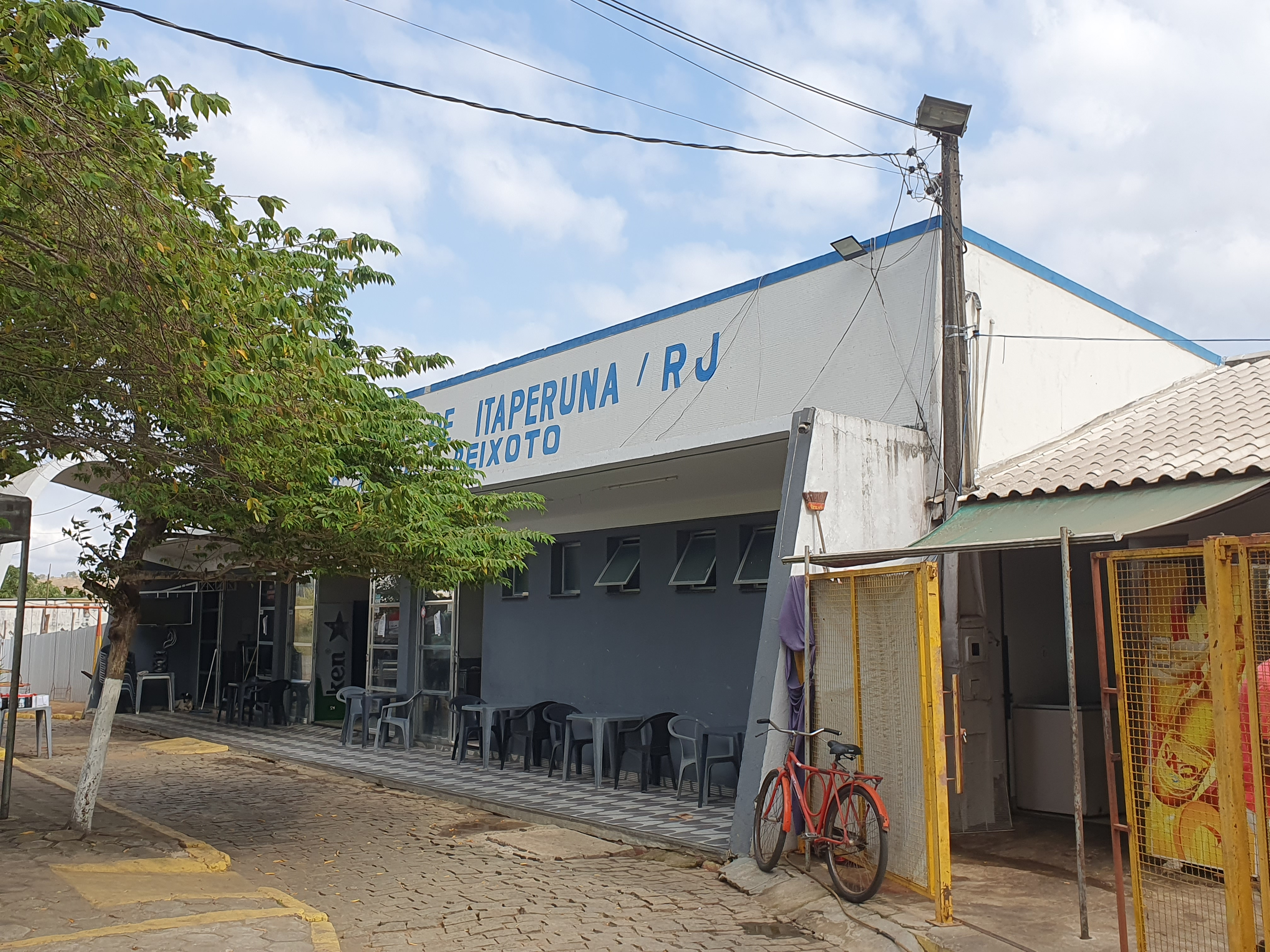
Itaperuna Airport terminal landside

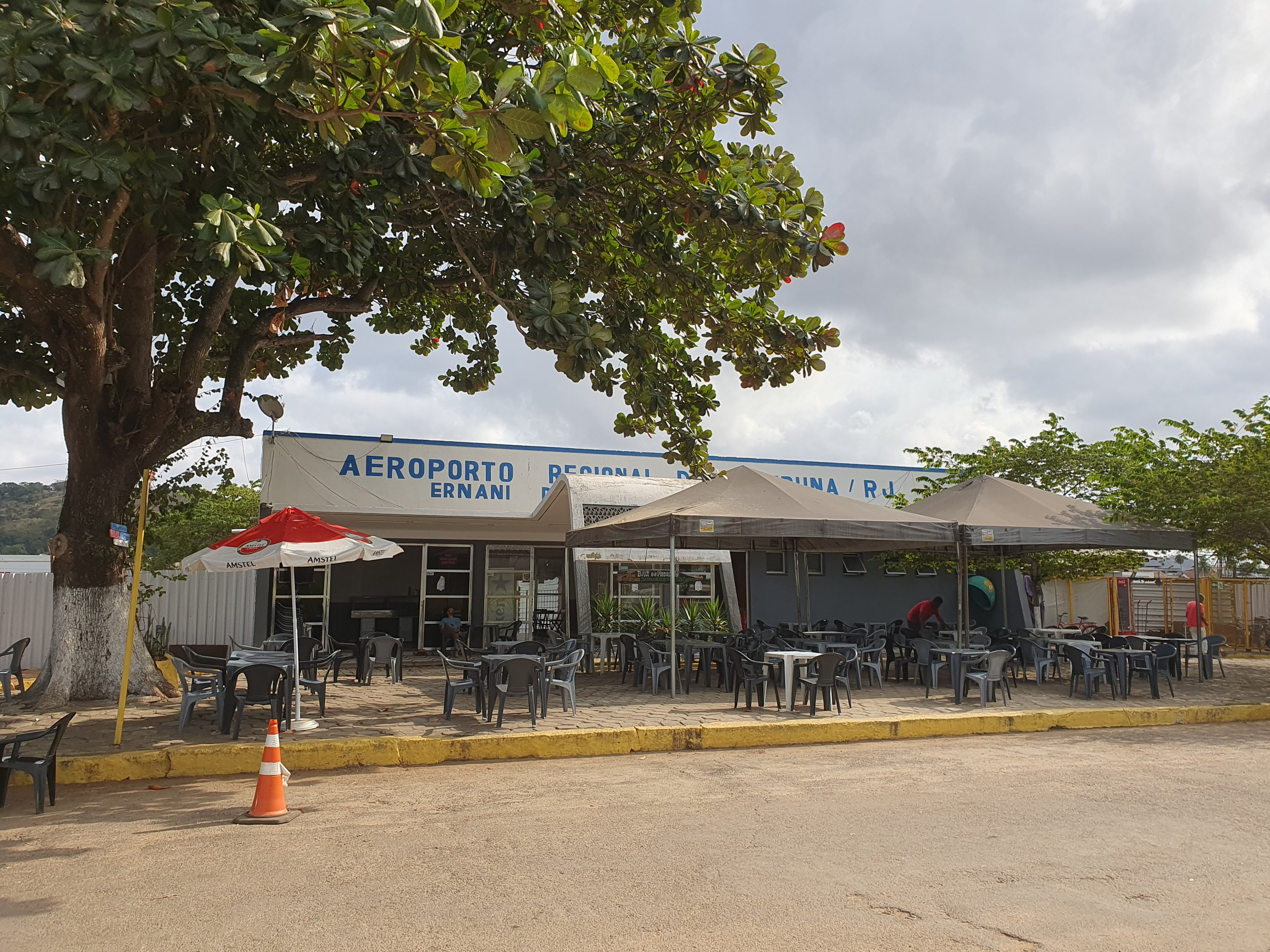
Itaperuna Airport terminal landside

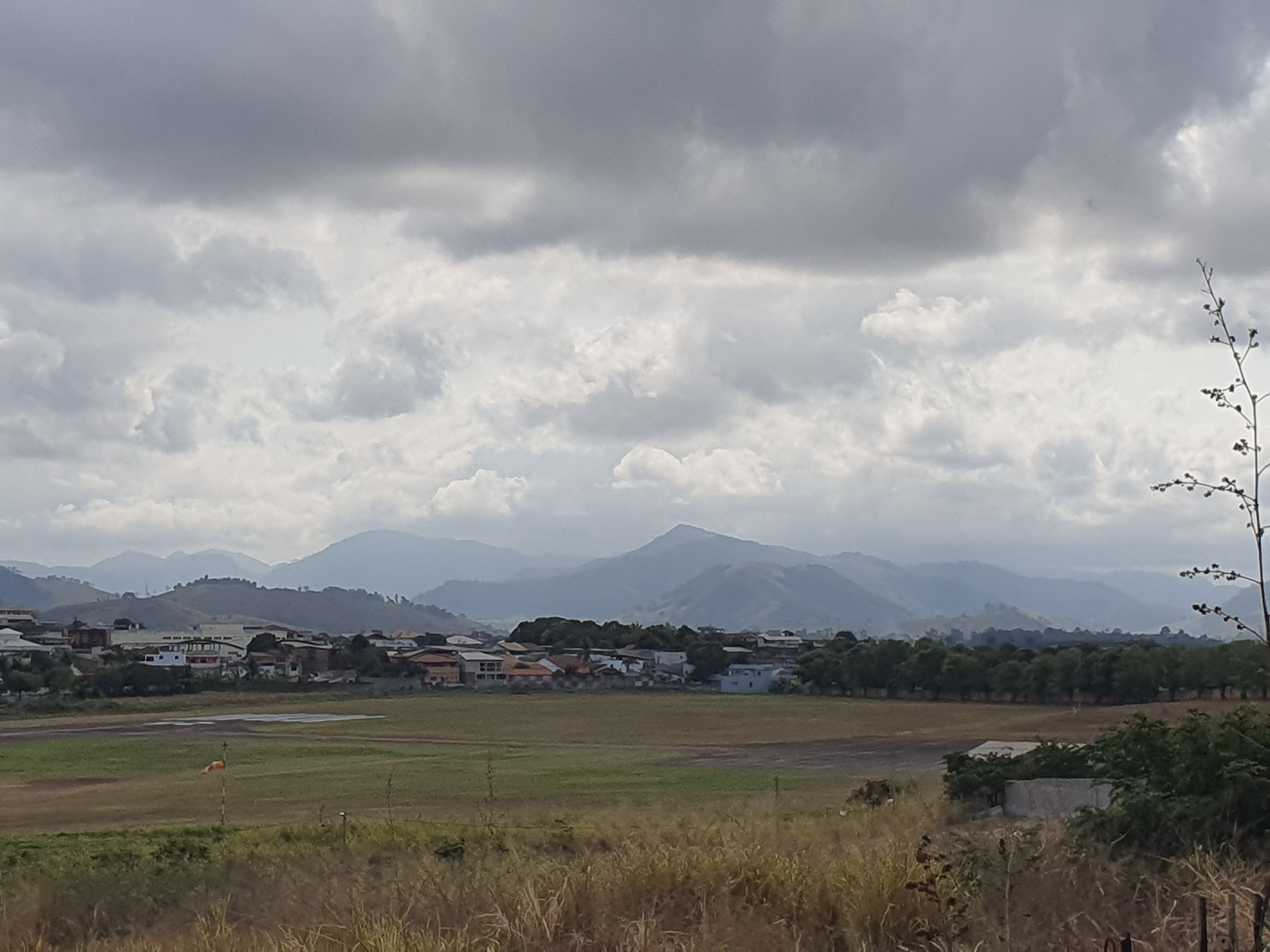
Itaperuna Airport panoramic view

== See also ==
- List of airports in Brazil
