= Zezé Moreira =

Brazilian footballer and manager (1907-1998)

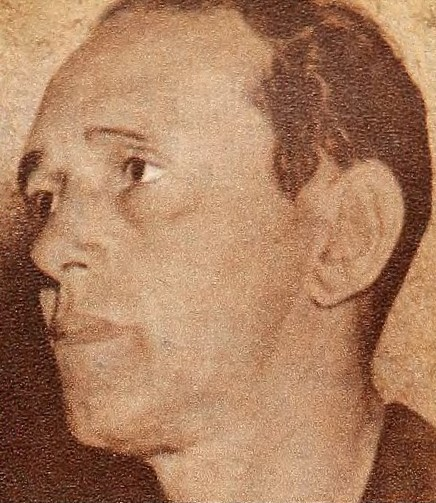

Personal information
- Full name: Alfredo Moreira Júnior
- Date of birth: 16 October 1907
- Place of birth: Miracema (RJ), Brazil
- Date of death: 10 April 1998 (aged 90)
- Place of death: Rio de Janeiro (RJ), Brazil

Senior career*
Years	Team	Apps	(Gls)
1933	Flamengo		
1935	Palestra Itália		
1935–1943	Botafogo		
1944–1945	America		

Managerial career
- 1948–1949: Botafogo
- 1951–1954: Fluminense
- 1952: Brazil
- 1954–1955: Botafogo
- 1954–1955: Brazil
- 1955–1956: Botafogo
- 1958–1962: Fluminense
- 1963: Palestino
- 1964: Nacional
- 1965–1966: Vasco da Gama
- 1966–1967: Corinthians
- 1967: Sport
- 1968–1969: Nacional
- 1970: São Paulo
- 1971–1972: Belenenses
- 1973: Fluminense
- 1975: Bahia
- 1975–1977: Cruzeiro
- 1978–1981: Bahia
- 1981: Canto do Rio
- * Club domestic league appearances and goals

Alfredo Moreira Júnior (16 October 1907 – 10 April 1998), usually known as Zezé Moreira, was a Brazilian football player and manager who coached Brazil at the 1954 FIFA World Cup. He has the most coaching appearances in Fluminense's history, with 467 managed matches for the Tricolor. His brothers also had a singular taste for football: Aymoré Moreira, winner of the 1962 FIFA World Cup and Ayrton Moreira, both of them successful coaches in the Brazilian football. In 1976, as Cruzeiro's manager, he won the Copa Libertadores.

== Career ==
Zezé Moreira was born in Miracema, Rio de Janeiro, Brazil.

As a footballer, he played for Sport Club Brasil, Palestra Itália (nowadays Palmeiras), Flamengo and Botafogo.

Zezé Moreira managed several clubs, like Fluminense, Botafogo, Cruzeiro, Sport Recife and Nacional of Uruguay. He was also the Brazil national team manager in 1952, 1954 and 1955.

== Managerial statistics ==
Team	Nation	From	To	Record							
Team	Nation	From	To	G	W	D	L	F	A	GD	Win %
Botafogo	Brazil	1948	1949	50	32	10	8	129	67	+63	64
Fluminense	Brazil	1951	1954	103	64	16	23	230	129	+101	62.14
Brazil	Brazil	1952	1952	5	4	1	0	14	2	+2	80
Botafogo	Brazil	1954	1956	89	42	16	31	162	127	+35	47.19
Brazil	Brazil	1954	1955	11	7	3	1	25	11	+14	63.64
Fluminense	Brazil	1957	1962	166	103	33	29	331	158	+175	62.05
Nacional	Uruguay	1963	1963	39	30	4	5	83	22	+61	76.92
Palestino	Chile	1964	1964	34	10	5	19	44	68	-24	29.41
Vasco da Gama	Brazil	1965	1966	42	21	6	15	67	52	+15	50
Corinthians	Brazil	1966	1967	50	30	9	11	99	61	+38	60
Sport	Brazil	1967	1967	16	10	2	4	25	18	+7	62.5
Nacional	Uruguay	1968	1969	59	35	17	7	107	30	+77	59.32
São Paulo	Brazil	1970	1970	34	15	8	11	43	35	+8	44.12
Belenenses	Portugal	1971	1972	34	14	7	13	41	37	+4	41.18
Fluminense	Brazil	1973	1973	52	21	17	14	60	41	+19	40.38
Bahia	Brazil	1975	1975	21	11	10	0	29	10	+19	52.38
Cruzeiro	Brazil	1975	1977	126	73	31	22	225	98	+127	57.94
Bahia	Brazil	1978	1981	174	86	49	39	242	133	+109	49.43
Total				1,104	609	243	252	1,956	1,099	+847	55.16

As of 13 July 2023

== Honours ==
=== Player ===
Flamengo

- Campeonato Carioca: 1925, 1927

Palmeiras

- Campeonato Paulista: 1934

=== Manager ===
Botafogo

- Campeonato Carioca: 1948

Fluminense

- Campeonato Carioca: 1951, 1959
- Copa Rio: 1952

Brazil

- Panamerican Championship: 1952

Vasco da Gama

- Torneio Rio-São Paulo: 1966

São Paulo

- Campeonato Paulista: 1970

Cruzeiro

- Campeonato Mineiro: 1975
- Copa Libertadores: 1976

Bahia

- Campeonato Baiano: 1978, 1979

Nacional

- Uruguayan Primera División: 1963, 1969

== See also ==
- List of football managers with the most matches
