= Max Lemos =

Brazilian politician (born 1966)

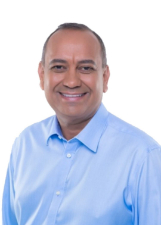
- Lemos in 2022

Member of the Chamber of Deputies
- Incumbent
- Assumed office 1 February 2023
- Constituency: Rio de Janeiro

Personal details
- Born: 17 January 1966 (age 60)
- Party: Democratic Labour Party (since 2023)

Max Rodrigues Lemos (born 17 January 1966) is a Brazilian politician serving as a member of the Chamber of Deputies since 2023. From 2019 to 2022, he was a member of the Legislative Assembly of Rio de Janeiro. From 2009 to 2016, he served as mayor of Queimados.
