= Queimados =

- Municipality
- Município de Queimados
- Flag Coat of arms

- Location of Queimados in the state of Rio de Janeiro

- Location of Queimados in Brazil
- Coordinates: 22°42′57″S 43°33′18″W
- Country: Brazil
- Region: Southeast
- State: Rio de Janeiro

Government
  - Prefeito: Carlos Vilella (PMDB)

Area
  - Total: 75.701 km^{2} (29.228 sq mi)
- Elevation: 29 m (95 ft)

Population (2022 Census)
  - Total: 140,523
  - Estimate (2025): 149,135
  - Density: 1,856.3/km^{2} (4,807.8/sq mi)
- Time zone: UTC−3 (BRT)

Queimados (Portuguese pronunciation: [kejˈmadus]) is a municipality located in the Brazilian state of Rio de Janeiro. It is located at 22º42'58" south latitude and 43º33'19" west longitude, at an altitude of 29 meters. Its population was 140,523 (2022 Census) and its area is 75 km^{2}. The city is divided into 37 districts.

== History ==
On March 29, 1858, the imperial family, aboard the first train of the Estrada de Ferro D. Pedro II, went on a special mission to inaugurate the 48 km stretch between Campo Station and Queimados. The population of the village, who attended the ceremony, felt honored by the Emperor's visit and understood that moment as the official inauguration of the town of Queimados. In the 18th century, the location where the Municipality of Queimados is located was part of the lands of the parish of Nossa Senhora da Conceição de Marapicu. This was the last of the parishes of the then Municipality of Iguassu, which was still made up of the parishes of Nossa Senhora da Piedade do Iguassu, Santo Antonio da Jacutinga, Nossa Senhora do Pilar and São João de Meriti. The Parish of Nossa Senhora do Marapicu, due to its economic importance, ended up receiving the title of Perpetual Parish. With the expansion of the coffee economy in the mid-19th century, the D. Pedro II Railway was built, bringing greater prosperity to the region. The initial project for this railway envisaged extending the tracks to the parish of Nossa Senhora de Belém e Menino Deus, now Jacutinga, which even built a building to house the station. However, thousands of Chinese workers who built the railway fell victim to malaria and cholera epidemics, which devastated the entire colony in 1855.

== Politics ==
=== Mayors ===
1993 - 1996 - Jorge Cesar Pereira da Cunha 1997 - 2000 - Azair Ramos da Silva 2001 - 2004 - Azair Ramos da Silva 2005 - 2008 - Carlos Rogério dos Santos - "Roger Hall" 2009 - 2012 - Max Lemos 2013 - 2016 - Max Lemos

=== Presidents of the Chamber of Aldermen ===
1993 - 1996 - Albino Carlos Pires de Andrade 1997 - 2000 - Milton Antonio Campos 2001 - 2004 - Max Lemos 2005 - 2008 - Milton Antonio Campos 2009 - current - Milton Antonio Campos

=== Alderman ===
1993 - 1996

Azair Ramos da Silva Albino Carlos Pires de Andrade Geraldo Ramos da Costa - "Geraldão" Gilberto de Oliveira Peres - "Gil's Glory" Jorge dos Santos Nascimento José Alves de Carvalho - "Dequinha" Jose Carlos Nunes de Paula - "Zé Carlos" Milton Antonio Campos Pedro Pereira Portes

1997 - 2000

Adir Antonio Loredo - "Didi Loredo" Carlos Rogério dos Santos - "Roger Hall" Delson de Oliveira Matos Galba Tavares Geraldo Ramos da Costa - "Geraldão" Gilberto de Oliveira Peres - "Gil's Glory" José Alves de Carvalho - "Dequinha" Jose Bittencourt Filho - "Zuzinha" Jose Carlos Nunes de Paula - "Zé Carlos" Jose Dantas - "Pastor Dantas" Luciano Luis Moreyra - "Luciano Gomes" Manoel Soares Belchior Milton Antonio Campos Moacir Algusto Hosea Moreira dos Santos

==== Substitutes ====
Itamar Rose Rodrigues Geraldo Dias da Silva Pedro Pereira Portes Leda Ferreira da Silva Gonçalves

2001 - 2004

Adir Antonio Loredo - "Didi Loredo" Carlos Roberto de Moraes - "Bald" Carlos Rogério dos Santos - "Roger Hall" Delso de Oliveira Matos Ismael Lopes de Oliveira Jairo da Costa Lima - "Jairinho" Jose Carlos Nunes de Paula - "Zé Carlos" Luciano Luiz Moreira - "Luciano Gomes" Max Lemos Milton Antonio Campos Neli Nery Fraga da Silva - "Lica São Roque" Ozéias Moreira dos Santos Paulo Bernardo da Silva - "Paul Witch" Paulo Roberto da Silva - "Pastor Paulinho" Sampaio Wilson - "Wilson's Three Fountains"

==== Substitutes ====
Moacir Augusto Jose Dantas - "Pastor Dantas" Robson de Souza Silva

2005 - 2008

Adir Antonio Loredo - "Didi Loredo" Carlos Roberto de Moraes - "Bald" Gilmar Ferreira de Novais - "Gil São Roque" Jefferson Dias da Silva John the Baptist Scoponi José Alves de Carvalho - "Dequinha" Milton Antonio Campos Nilton Moreira Cavalcanti Paulo César Pires de Andrade - "Paulinho See Everything" Robson Chedid - "Conspiracy of Binho" Robson de Souza Silva

2009 - 2012

Carlos Machado de Oliveira - "Axe" Carlos Roberto de Moraes - "Bald" Sender Carlos dos Santos - "Carlão Water is Life" David Brazil Caetano - "David Brazil" Elton Teixeira da Silva Rosa Jairo da Costa Lima - "Jairinho" Jefferson Dias da Silva Julio Alves Goes - "Dr Julius Goes" Milton Antonio Campos - "Milton Fields" Paulo César Pires de Andrade - "Paulinho See Everything" Sampaio Wilson - "Wilson's Three Fountains"

==== Substitutes ====
Robson Chedid - "Conspiracy of Binho" Fatima Cristina Dias Sanches - "Dr Fatima"

2012 - 2016

Fatima Cristina Dias Sanches - "Dr Fatima" Sampaio Wilson - "Wilson's Three Fountains" Carlos Roberto de Moraes - "Bald" Lucio Mauro Lima Castro - "Lucio Mauro" Elton Teixeira Rosa da Silva - "Elton Teixeira" Getulio de Moura - "Getulio tutu" Elerson Leandro Alves - "Elerson" Antonio Almeida Silva - "Anthony Almeida" Paulo César Pires de Andrade - "Paulinho See Everything" Milton Antonio Campos - "Milton Fields" Nilton Moreira Cavalcanti - "Professor Nilton Moreira" Adriano Morie - "Morie" Leandro Silveira War - "War Léo"

==== Substitutes ====
Carlos Machado de Oliveira - "Machado Laz" MARCOS ALVES VALÉRIO ROSA - "MARQUINHO massive package" José Alves de Carvalho - "Dequinha" Martchellos de Almeida Parreiras Fuli - "Martchello" Chrispe Antonio de Oliveira - "Tuninho Vira Virou" Marcelo Leyed Miranda - "Marcelo Picciani" Marcelo de Jesus Teixeira Lessa - "Marcelo Lessa"

== Infrastructure ==
=== Transportation ===
Queimados has two bus companies that make municipal paths: Gardel Fazeni Tourism and Transport and Tourism; Five Companies make Intermunicipal Paths: Linave Transport, Transport Blanco, Gardel Tourism, Transport and Tourism and Fazeni Nilopolitana Cavalcanti and Co. A Train Station Meets Extension of Japeri SuperVia, Burnley Station References
