= Paquito (footballer, born 1981) =

Brazilian footballer

Personal information
- Full name: Anderson Luiz Pinheiro
- Date of birth: 13 December 1981 (age 44)
- Place of birth: Curitiba, Brazil
- Height: 1.75 m (5 ft 9 in)
- Position: Midfielder

Senior career*
Years	Team	Apps	(Gls)
2000	Juventus (SP)		
2000–2001	Napoli		
2001	→ Ravenna (loan)		
2001–2003	Cosenza		
2002	→ Juventus (SP) (loan)		
2003–2005	Chiasso		
2005–2006	Crotone		
2006	Chiasso		
2006–2009	Luzern		
2007–2008	→ Enosis Neon Paralimni (loan)		
2009	OFI		
2010–2011	Yverdon-Sport		
- * Club domestic league appearances and goals as of 7 October 2011

Anderson Luiz Pinheiro (born 13 December 1981), known as Paquito, is a Brazilian footballer.

== Club career ==
Born in Curitiba, Brazil, Paquito started his European career since arrived at Napoli in July 2000. In January 2001, his left for Serie B side Ravenna. On 1 July 2001, he was signed by Cosenza. He spent 2002–03 season on loan to Brazil and then left for Challenge League side Chiasso. In 2005–06 season, he played the round 1 match for Chiasso on 16 July 2005, but signed by Crotone soon after. In January 2006 he return to Chiasso, from Italian speaking region Ticino. In the next season he was signed by Swiss Super League side Luzern. He was out-favoured in the 2007–08 season, he left for Enosis Neon Paralimni then played with the Luzern B. In January 2009 he left for OFI.

After a year without a club, he returned to Switzerland for Yverdon-Sport.

== Privates ==
He also holds an Italian passport and is the brother of Juninho.
