= Stam Metalúrgica =

- Industry: Metallurgy
- Founded: March 1, 1971; 55 years ago in Nova Friburgo, Rio de Janeiro
- Key people: Helena Herdy Faria
- Products: Padlocks, locks, and hinges
- Website: stam.com.br

Stam Metalúrgica is a Brazilian manufacturer of padlocks, locks, and hardware, headquartered in the Conselheiro Paulino district of Nova Friburgo, in the state of Rio de Janeiro. Founded in 1971, it is considered the largest manufacturer in the industry in Brazil and has one of the most modern industrial complexes in Latin America, with approximately 40,000 square meters of floor space.

The company has more than 1,500 employees.

== History ==
The business was founded in March 1, 1971 by Francisco Faria, starting in a small family-run shed. Initially, Stam broke new ground by using Zamac in the production of its products, which allowed it to offer competitive prices compared to the market leaders at the time. After the founder's death, management passed to his wife, Helena Herdy Faria, and his son, Rogério Faria.

In 2025, on its 54th anniversary, the company reached the milestone of 1,500 employees, with more than 93% of its workforce consisting of residents of Nova Friburgo. Stam exports to countries such as Bolivia, Paraguay, Uruguay, Peru, and Ecuador.

== Awards ==
In 2025, the company received the Anamaco Award. It also received international recognition through the 2025 iF Design Award.

== Social Projects ==
Since 2006, the company has been running the Gol de Placa project, a nonprofit organization that serves approximately 200 children and teenagers in Nova Friburgo through sports.
