= Kleber Juninho =

Brazilian footballer

Personal information
- Full name: Kleber Alves da Costa Junior
- Date of birth: 31 May 1999 (age 27)
- Place of birth: Americana, Brazil
- Height: 1.73 m (5 ft 8 in)
- Position: Right winger

Youth career
- 2018: União Barbarense
- 2018–2020: Internacional

Senior career*
Years	Team	Apps	(Gls)
2018	União Barbarense	2	(0)
2020	Rio Claro	3	(0)
2020–2021	União Barbarense	7	(0)
2021	Rio Branco-VN	0	(0)
2021–2022	Hirnyk-Sport Horishni Plavni	9	(0)
- * Club domestic league appearances and goals as of 25 September 2022

Kleber Alves da Costa Junior (born 31 May 1999), known as Kleber Juninho, is a Brazilian professional footballer who plays as a right winger.
