= Juninho (footballer, born 1992) =

Brazilian footballer

Personal information
- Full name: Denilton Venturim Júnior
- Date of birth: 5 August 1992 (age 34)
- Place of birth: Presidente Bernardes (SP), Brazil
- Position: Midfielder

Team information
- Current team: ND Gorica

Youth career
- 2011: Paulista FC

Senior career*
Years	Team	Apps	(Gls)
2012–2013	Palmeiras B		
2013–2014	Lumezzane	0	(0)
2014	→ Ivinhema (loan)		
2014	→ Paulista FC (loan)		
2014–2015	Gorica	8	(0)
- * Club domestic league appearances and goals

Denilton Venturim Júnior (born 5 August 1992), known as his diminutive name Juninho, is a Brazilian footballer.

== Biography ==
Juninho is a youth product of São Paulo club Paulista F.C. He was a player for Palmeiras B in 2012 Campeonato Paulista Série A2 and 2013 Campeonato Paulista Série A3 (second and third division of São Paulo state). He also played for Palmeiras B in 2012 Copa Paulista.

=== Europe ===
In summer 2013 he was signed by Italian third division club Lumezzane. He was transformed from defensive midfielder to centre-back in pre-season camp. In January 2014 he was loaned back to Brazil for Ivinhema. Later that year he returned to Paulista F.C.

In July 2014 Juninho returned to Italy for Lumezzane. He was a player in pre-season friendlies. In mid-August 2014 he was linked to Padova. On 29 August 2014 Juninho was signed by Slovenian club ND Gorica in a 2-year contract. The deal was completed on 2 September and announced on 4 September. He was excluded from the squad on 22 January 2015, despite his contract was not yet terminated.
