= Juninho (footballer, born May 1981) =

Brazilian footballer

Personal information
- Full name: Fidelis Júnior Santana da Silva
- Date of birth: May 14, 1981 (age 45)
- Place of birth: Rio de Janeiro, Brazil
- Position: Midfielder

Senior career*
Years	Team	Apps	(Gls)
200?–2004	Friburguense		
2005–2007	FC Winterthur		
2007	Floresta		
2008	Salgueiro		
2009	Sinop		
2009	Aperibeense		
- * Club domestic league appearances and goals

Juninho realname Fidelis Júnior Santana da Silva (born 14 May 1981 in Rio de Janeiro) is a Brazilian footballer who played as an attacking midfielder.

He also played for Friburguense and Swiss club FC Winterthur.

He signed a contract until the end of 2007 on 3 August 2007 for Floresta.

He was released in December 2007. After not played in state league, he signed a contract with Salgueiro of Brasileiro Série C until end of season.
