= Laje do Muriaé =

- Municipality
- Município de Laje do Muriaé
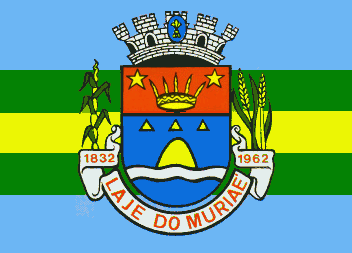
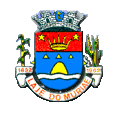
- Flag Coat of arms

- Location of Laje do Muriaé in the state of Rio de Janeiro

- Location of Laje do Muriaé in Brazil
- Coordinates: 21°12′21″S 42°07′22″W
- Country: Brazil
- Region: Southeast
- State: Rio de Janeiro

Government
  - Prefeito: Rivelino da Silva Bueno (PSC)

Area
  - Total: 387.073 km^{2} (149.450 sq mi)
- Elevation: 221 m (725 ft)

Population (2022)
  - Total: 15,074
  - Density: 38.944/km^{2} (100.86/sq mi)
- Time zone: UTC-3 (UTC-3)

Laje do Muriaé ([ˈlaʒi du ˌmuɾjɐˈɛ]) is a municipality located in the Brazilian state of Rio de Janeiro. Its population was 15,074 (2022) and its area is 387 km^{2} (149 sq mi).
