= Juninho Barros =

Brazilian footballer

Personal information
- Full name: André Alexandre de Barros Junior
- Date of birth: 21 March 1996 (age 30)
- Place of birth: Recife, Brazil
- Height: 1.72 m (5 ft 8 in)
- Position: Midfielder

Team information
- Current team: Afogados da Ingazeira

Youth career
- Santa Cruz
- Náutico
- Sport

Senior career*
Years	Team	Apps	(Gls)
2015	Vera Cruz	0	(0)
2016	Fortaleza		
2017	Marília		
2017–2018	Dornbirn 1913	26	(2)
2018–2019	Austria Lustenau II	1	(0)
2018–2019	Austria Lustenau	3	(1)
2021–	Afogados da Ingazeira	2	(0)
- * Club domestic league appearances and goals as of 21:14, 3 April 2021 (UTC)

André Alexandre de Barros Junior (born 21 March 1996), known simply as Juninho Barros, is a Brazilian footballer who plays as a midfielder for Afogados da Ingazeira.

== Career statistics ==
=== Club ===
As of 10 December 2018

Appearances and goals by club, season and competition
Club	Season	League			Cup		Continental		Other		Total	
Club	Season	Division	Apps	Goals	Apps	Goals	Apps	Goals	Apps	Goals	Apps	Goals
Vera Cruz	2015	–			0	0	–		1 (Note: Appearances in the Campeonato Pernambucano)	0	1	0
Dornbirn 1913	2017–18	Regionalliga West	26	2	1 (Note: Appearances in the Austrian Cup)	0	–		0	0	27	2
Austria Lustenau	2018–19	2. Liga	1	0	1	0	–		0	0	2	0
Career total			27	2	2	0	0	0	1	0	30	2
