= Cambuci, Rio de Janeiro =

Cambuci
- Municipality
- Município de Cambuci
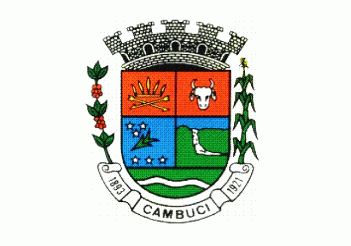
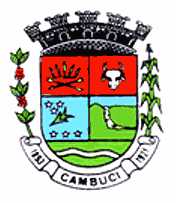
- Flag Coat of arms

- Location of Cambuci in the state of Rio de Janeiro

- Location of Cambuci in Brazil
- Coordinates: 21°34′30″S 41°54′39″W
- Country: Brazil
- Region: Southeast
- State: Rio de Janeiro

Government
  - Prefeito: Agnaldo Vieira Mello (PMDB)

Area
  - Total: 561.739 km^{2} (216.889 sq mi)
- Elevation: 221 m (725 ft)

Population (2020)
  - Total: 15,514
- Time zone: UTC-3 (UTC-3)

Cambuci (Portuguese pronunciation: [kɐ̃buˈsi], Cambuci Berry) is a municipality located in the Brazilian state of Rio de Janeiro. Its population was 15,514 (2020) and its area is 562 km^{2} (217 sq mi). The calculated population for 2009 was 18,256. It is a popular destination for tourists.
