= Aperibé =

- Municipality
- Município de Aperibé
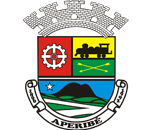
- Flag Coat of arms

- Location of Aperibé in the state of Rio de Janeiro

- Location of Aperibé in Brazil
- Coordinates: 21°37′15″S 42°06′10″W
- Country: Brazil
- Region: Southeast
- State: Rio de Janeiro

Government
  - Prefeito: Ronald de Cássio Daibes Moreira (PSD)

Area
  - Total: 88.780 km^{2} (34.278 sq mi)
- Elevation: 221 m (725 ft)

Population (2020)
  - Total: 11,901
- Time zone: UTC-3 (UTC-3)

Aperibé (Portuguese pronunciation: [ɐpeɾiˈbɛ], [apɛɾiˈbɛ]) is a municipality located in the Brazilian state of Rio de Janeiro. Its population was 11,901 (2020) and its area is 89 km^{2} (34 sq mi).

Location of Aperibé within Rio de Janeiro state
