= Italva =

- Municipality
- Município de Italva
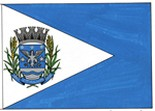
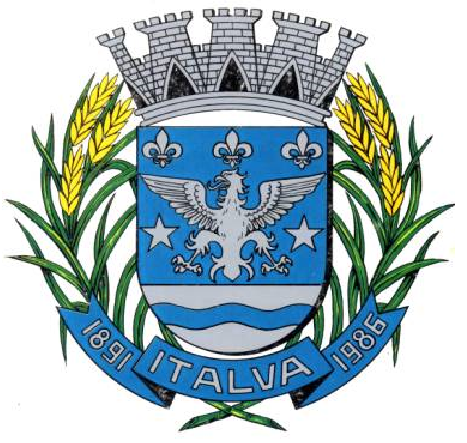
- Flag Coat of arms

- Location of Italva in the state of Rio de Janeiro

- Location of Italva in Brazil
- Coordinates: 21°25′15″S 41°41′27″W
- Country: Brazil
- Region: Southeast
- State: Rio de Janeiro

Government
  - Prefeito: Léo Pelanca (PL)

Area
  - Total: 291.193 km^{2} (112.430 sq mi)
- Elevation: 36 m (118 ft)

Population (2022)
  - Total: 14,073
  - Density: 48.329/km^{2} (125.17/sq mi)
- Time zone: UTC-3 (UTC-3)

Italva (Portuguese pronunciation: [iˈtawvɐ]) is a municipality located in the Brazilian state of Rio de Janeiro. Its population was 14,073 (2020) and its area is 291 km^{2} (112 sq mi).
