= Itaocara =

- Municipality
- Município de Itaocara
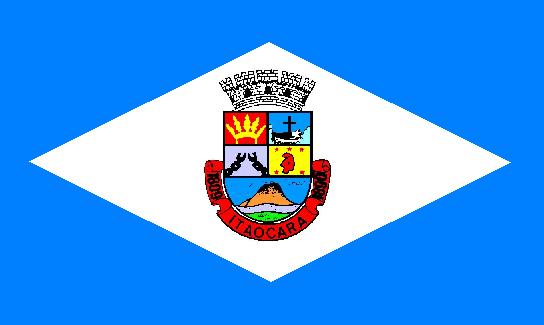
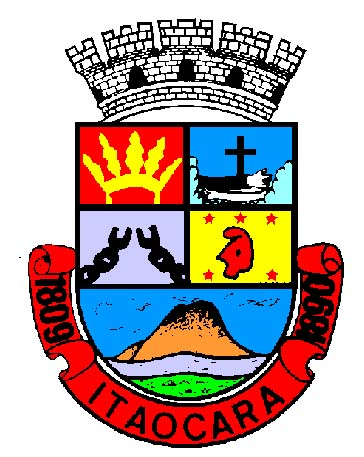
- Flag Coat of arms

- Location of Itaocara in the state of Rio de Janeiro

- Location of Itaocara in Brazil
- Coordinates: 21°40′44″S 42°04′55″W
- Country: Brazil
- Region: Southeast
- State: Rio de Janeiro

Government
  - Prefect: Geyves Maia Vieira (Cidadania)

Area
  - Total: 428.440 km^{2} (165.422 sq mi)
- Elevation: 60 m (200 ft)

Population (2020)
  - Total: 23,222
- Time zone: UTC-3 (UTC-3)

Itaocara (Portuguese pronunciation: [iˌtaoˈkaɾɐ], [itɐwˈkaɾɐ]) is a municipality located in the Brazilian state of Rio de Janeiro. Its population is 23,222 (2020) and its area is 428 km^{2} (165 sq mi).
