= São José de Ubá =

- Municipality
- Município de São José de Ubá
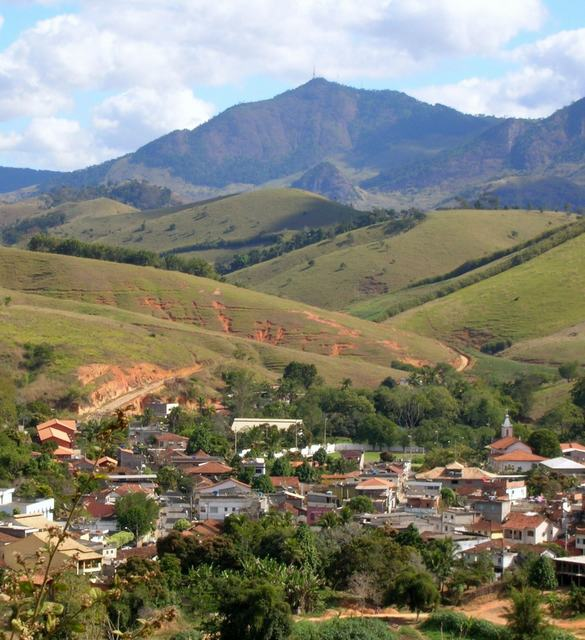
- Skyline

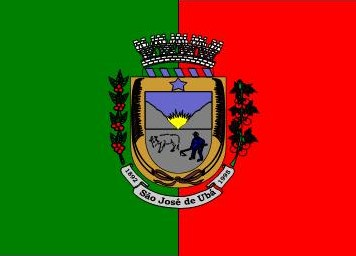
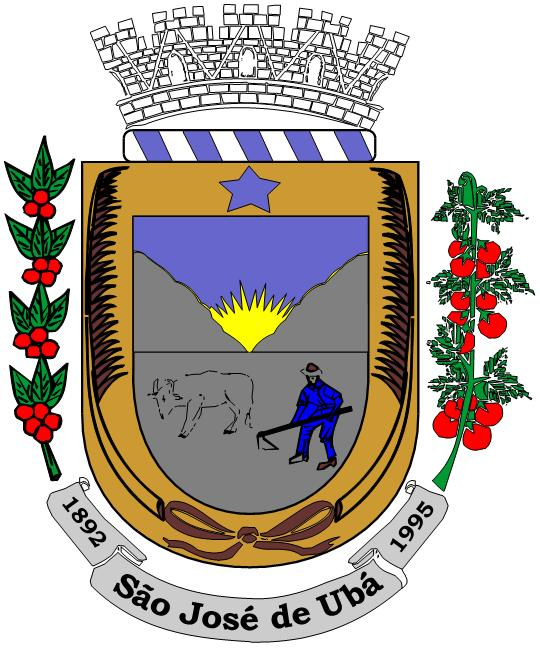
- Flag Coat of arms
- Nickname: Tomatoland
- Location of São José de Ubá in the state of Rio de Janeiro

- Location of São José de Ubá in Brazil
- Coordinates: 21°21′28″S 41°56′34″W
- Country: Brazil
- Region: Southeast
- State: Rio de Janeiro

Government
  - Mayor: Marcionílio Botelho Moreira (PP)

Area
  - Total: 249.688 km^{2} (96.405 sq mi)
- Elevation: 95 m (312 ft)

Population (2022)
  - Total: 7.070
- Time zone: UTC−3 (BRT)
- Website: Official website

São José de Ubá (Portuguese pronunciation: [ˈsɐ̃w ʒuˈzɛ dʒ(j)uˈba]) is a municipality located in the Brazilian state of Rio de Janeiro.

== Demography ==
In 2022, the population was 7.070 inhabitants. In 2026, the population was estimated at 7.328.

== Geography ==
According to the Brazilian Institute of Geography and Statistics (IBGE), the municipality covers an area of 249,688 km², of which 0,96 km² is urban.

=== Climate ===
The climate in São José da Vitória is tropical (Köppen: Aw). Its average temperature is 22,5 °C.
