= Miracema =

- Municipality
- Município de Miracema
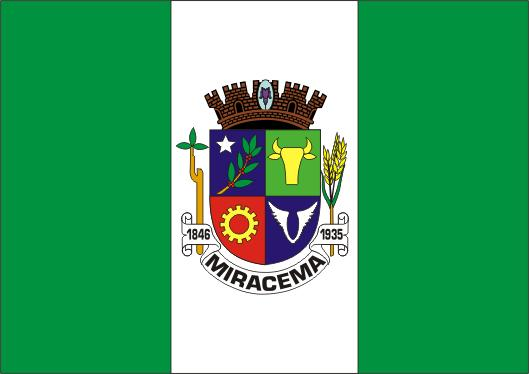
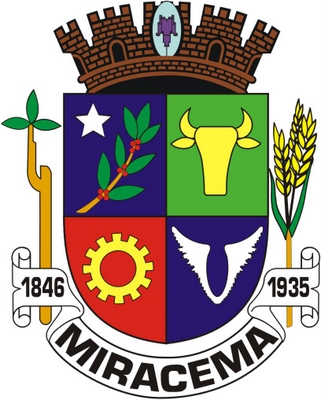
- Flag Coat of arms

- Location of Miracema in the state of Rio de Janeiro

- Location of Miracema in Brazil
- Coordinates: 21°24′43″S 42°11′49″W
- Country: Brazil
- Region: Southeast
- State: Rio de Janeiro

Government
  - Prefeito: Clovis Tostes de Barros (PP)

Area
  - Total: 303.353 km^{2} (117.125 sq mi)
- Elevation: 137 m (449 ft)

Population (2020)
  - Total: 27,154
- Time zone: UTC-3 (UTC-3)

Miracema (/ˌmiːrəˈsɛmə/ MEE-rə-SEH-mə; Portuguese pronunciation: [miɾɐˈsemɐ]) is a municipality located in the Rio de Janeiro state's northwestern region, bordering Minas Gerais state, Brazil and with a population of 27,154 inhabitants living in an area of 302.5 km^{2}. Its main economic activities are agriculture and milk production.

== History ==
In the early 20th century, coffee was the city's most important economic activity, and Rio de Janeiro state was the greatest coffee producer of the country.

== Sports ==
Brazilian football manager Aymoré Moreira, and his brothers, Zezé Moreira and Ayrton Moreira, who were also managers, were born in the city. Miracema Futebol Clube is a city's football club.
