= Paraíba Valley =

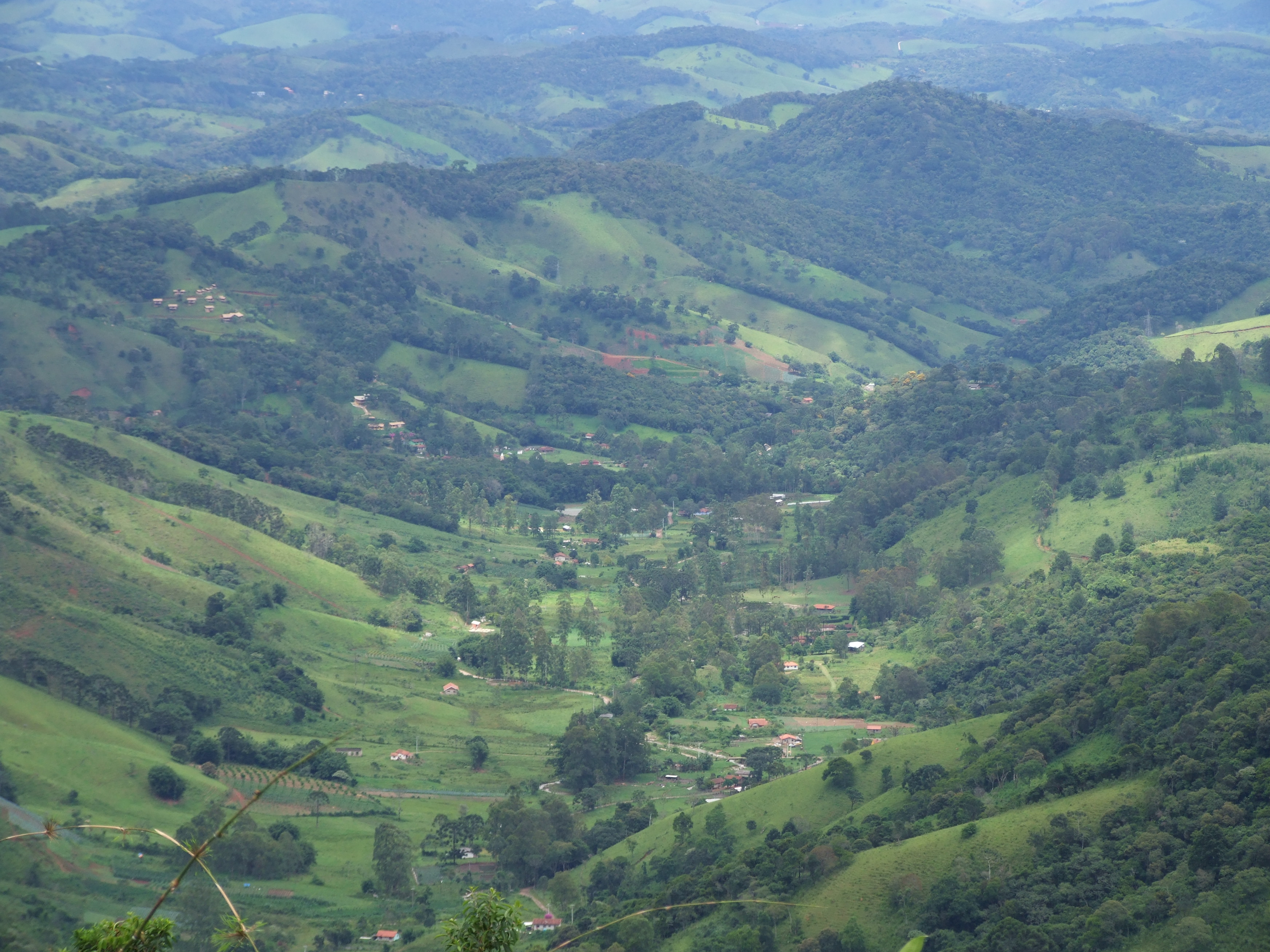
View of the valley from the Campos do Jordão mountains, SP

The Paraíba Valley (Portuguese: Vale do Paraíba) is a landform that encompasses the regions: Paraíba Valley Metropolitan Region and Northern Coast, in the state of São Paulo and Sul-Fluminense Region, in the state of Rio de Janeiro, which stands out for concentrating a considerable portion of the Brazilian economy.

The name is due to the fact that the region is part of the Paraíba do Sul river basin, since this river extends from the São Paulo and along almost the entire length of the state of Rio de Janeiro and a small southern part of the Minas Gerais state.

In the strict sense, the name "Vale do Paraíba", "Paraíba Valley" in English, should only be used to refer to a region with a certain geographical feature. Therefore, this is not an official IBGE Region, Mesoregion or Microregion.

== Location ==
It is located on the banks of the Presidente Dutra highway (BR-116), exactly between the cities of Rio de Janeiro and São Paulo, within the metropolitan complex formed by the two capitals and with its main urban axis following the Via Dutra route. Although highly urbanized and industrialized, the region also has important nature reserves, such as the Serra da Mantiqueira, on the border with Minas Gerais, one of the highest points in Brazil, and that of Bocaina, an Atlantic Forest stronghold that also includes small towns and farms of historical and architectural interest.

=== Municipalities of the region ===
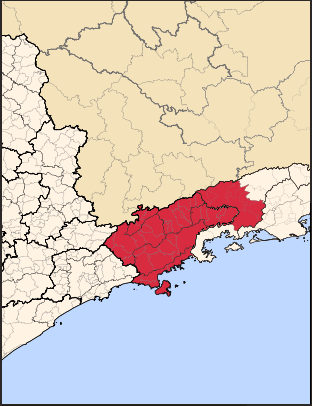
The Mesoregion of the São Paulo side of Paraíba Valley and the Microregion side of Rio de Janeiro side of the Paraíba Valley.

The total population of all municipalities in the region is almost 3.3 million, equivalent to the population of the Uruguay.

The most important cities in the region are:

- On Rio's Side: Volta Redonda, Resende, Barra Mansa and Barra do Piraí;
- On São Paulo's Side: São José dos Campos, Taubaté, Jacareí, Caçapava, Pindamonhangaba, Guaratinguetá, Lorena, Caraguatatuba and Cruzeiro. Beside those cities, Aparecida and Cachoeira Paulista, have great national prominence due to religious tourism.

Other cities in the region are:

- Rio's Side: Itatiaia, Pinheiral, Piraí, Quatis, Rio Claro, Valença, Rio das Flores, Porto Real and Paraty.
- São Paulo's Side: Arapeí, Areias, Bananal, Campos do Jordão, Canas, Cunha, Igaratá, Ilhabela, Jambeiro, Lagoinha, Lavrinhas, Monteiro Lobato, Natividade da Serra, Paraibuna, Piquete, Potim, Queluz, Redenção da Serra, Roseira, Santa Branca, São José do Barreiro, São Luiz do Paraitinga, São Sebastião, Silveiras, Tremembé and Ubatuba.

== Demography ==
The history of the Paraíba Valley is closely linked to the coffee cycle, a period of opulence that gave the region prestige and political power. Despite the city of Lorena that began its development with the gold cycle in the 1700s due to the passage through the Paraíba do Sul River.

At the beginning of the twentieth century, a group of Trappist religious settled in the Maristela farm in Tremembé, and introduced rice cultivation in the Paraíba do Sul river floodplains, as well as new planting and irrigation techniques.

Construction of the Companhia Siderúrgica Nacional – CSN, in 1941.

Milk production was introduced with the decay of coffee, which occurred after the world economic crisis of 1929.

The industrialization of the Paraíba Valley began in the 1940s during the Estado Novo, a set of new politics implemented at the time, following a diplomatic agreement made between Brazil and the United States, which envisaged an ambitious project: the construction of a steel mill that would supply the demand for steel from the Allied Countries during the Second World War and aid in the development of Brazil. In 1946, one of the largest steel complexes in the world and the largest in Latin America was inaugurated, Companhia Siderúrgica Nacional – CSN, located in Volta Redonda. The start of steel production at CSN served as the basis for the industrialization of the country and, especially, of Paraíba Valley, with the arrival of steel companies in the region, as well as the automotive and aerospace industry.

=== Economy ===
==== Agriculture and Livestock ====
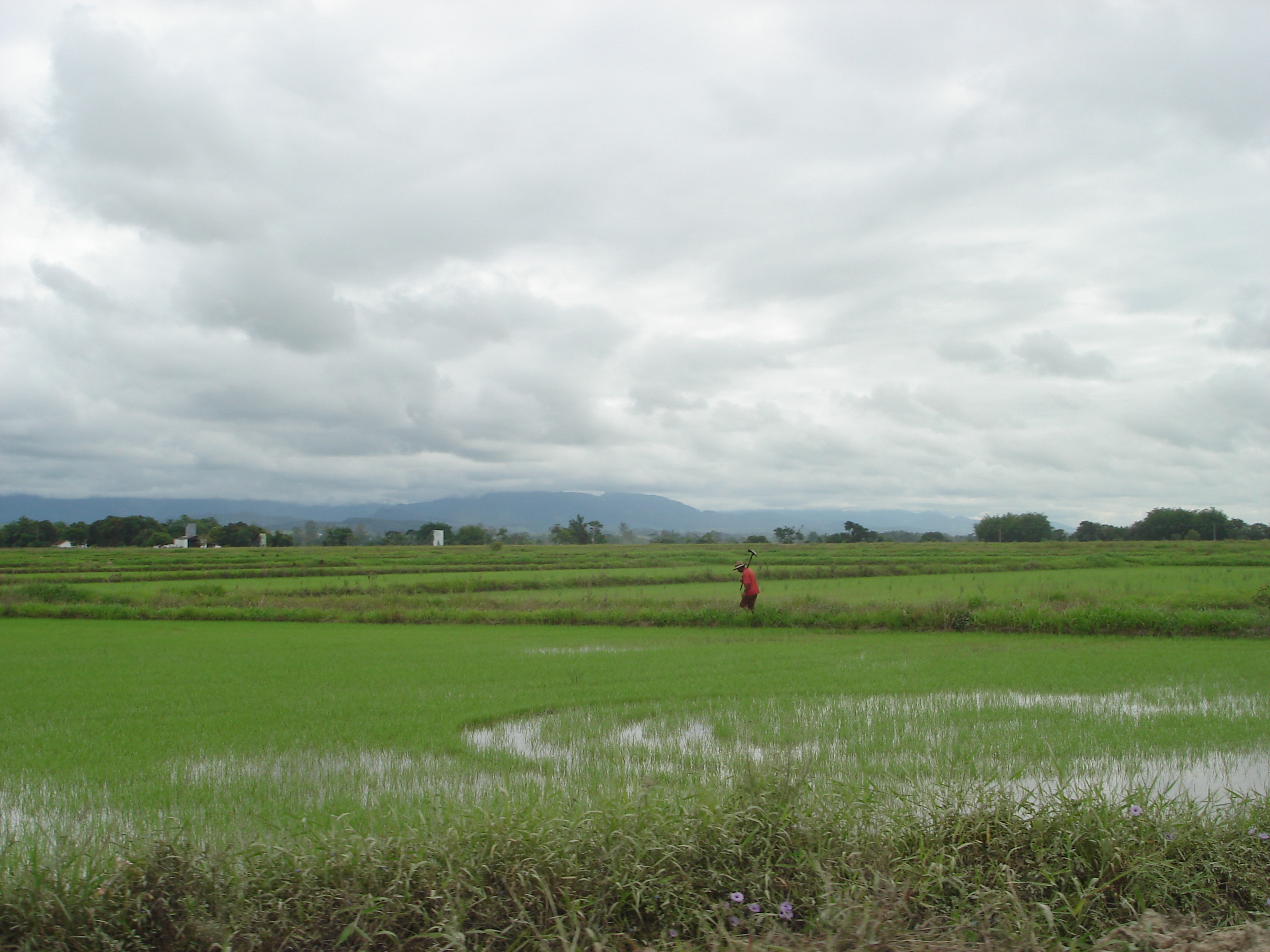
Rice Plantation in Pindamonhangaba.

Farming is still vital to several municipalities in this region, being the main source of revenue and taxes in some cities.

Vale do Paraíba is the second largest milk producer in the country. For cyclical reasons, milk production is in decline, but still sustains a large part of the rural population of small municipalities.

Rice is one of the most important agricultural products of the region reaching in the 2002/2003 harvest, the mark of 850 thousand bags of 60 kg.

Other diversified crops are being tried by some producers in these floodplains.

The current land structure of the Paraíba Valley is the result of significant changes in the form of land distribution that occurred after coffee decay, when large farms began to be shredded in family shares and inheritances. This process multiplied as the generations went on, resulting in a region punctuated by small properties and markedly familiar agricultural production.

==== Industry ====
In the 1950s, the region rapidly industrialized. At this time, in São Paulo, the creation of the Aeronautical Technological Institute, the consequent installation of the aeronautical industry with Embraer, the largest aerospace complex in Latin America, as well as the automakers Volkswagen, Ford, GM, Chery, LG and Ericsson, as well as Alstom and Usiminas, among others. In Rio de Janeiro, CSN attracted other mining and steel companies. Other industrial complexes include Coca-Cola, Nissan, Jaguar Land Rover, PSA Peugeot Citroën, MAN Trucks and Buses and Hyundai Heavy Industries, as well as Guardian do Brasil, ArcelorMittal Siderurgica Barra Mansa, Brazil's Nuclear Industries (INB), Michelin, White Martins, the National Rolled Steel Industry (INAL), the Brazilian Stannifer Company (CESBRA), S / A Tubonal, Saint-Gobain Channeling, among others.

=== Education ===
==== High school and Trade Education ====
The Paraíba Valley is a region that has several ETECs, a vocational school, present in the following cities ETEC Machado de Assis (Caçapava), ETEC Marcos Uchôas dos Santos Penchel (Cachoeira Paulista), ETEC Professor José Santana de Castro (Cruzeiro), ETEC Professor Alfredo de Barros Santos (Guaratinguetá), ETEC Canon José Bento (Jacareí), ETEC Father Carlos Leôncio da Silva (Lorena), ETEC João Gomes de Araújo (Pindamonhangaba), ETEC São José dos Campos (São José dos Campos), and ETEC Doctor Geraldo José Rodrigues Alckmin (Taubaté). In Rio de Janeiro jurisdiction, are the Federal Institute of Education, Science and Technology of the State of Rio de Janeiro, better known as the Federal Institute of Rio de Janeiro – IFRJ, being the second largest federal technical education network in the country, present in Pinheiral, as well as the Technical School Support Foundation – FAETEC, which has two teaching centers, located in Barra Mansa and Volta Redonda.

All cities in the Paraíba Valley have at least one school from the SENAR, SENAC, SESC, SESCOOP, SENAI, SESI, SEST, SENAT, SEBRAE Education System, among others that focus in vocational and trade studies.

São José dos Campos has the Embraer Juarez Wanderley High School, which despite being considered a private school is totally free, it serves 600 students in the three high school grades, full-time (10 hours / day – 6,000 class hours). in 3 years).

The cities of Lorena and Guaratinguetá also have technical colleges, also offering high school, linked to universities. In Lorena, is the Technical College of Lorena "Professor Nelson Pesciotta" (COTEL), which is linked to USP and offers full-time chemistry course. In Guaratinguetá, the Guaratinguetá Industrial Technical College "Prof. Carlos Augusto Patrício Amorim" (CTIG), linked to UNESP, offers 4 courses, Electronics, Electro-electronics, Mechanics and Informatics, all full-time. In both colleges, for the student to receive the degree of technician, there is the condition that the student must complete a supervised internship.

Guaratinguetá also opened E.E.A.R – School of Aeronautics Specialists, technical education unit of the Brazilian Air Force responsible for the training of Sergeants Specialists.

==== Higher Education ====
The Paraíba Valley is a region with a large concentration of higher education institutions. Among the public ones are: FATEC (Cruzeiro, Guaratinguetá, Pindamonhangaba, Taubaté, Jacareí and São José dos Campos), ITA (in São José dos Campos), UERJ (campus in Resende), UFF (campus in Volta Redonda), Unesp ( campus in São José dos Campos – Environmental Dentistry and Engineering and campus in Guaratinguetá), Unifesp (campus in São José dos Campos), USP (campus in Lorena) and UNITAU (campus in Taubaté).

In the region are also located the UFF School of Engineering (in Volta Redonda), the INPG College undergraduate and with MBA courses, a UNIP campus, the University of Vale do Paraíba (Univap, in São José dos Campos), Anhanguera Educacional (Taubaté, Pindamonhangaba, São José dos Campos and Jacareí, in Roseira), a Unisal campus (in Lorena), Fatea also in Lorraine, FCN (Canção Nova College, in Cachoeira Paulista), FARO (Roseira College), FAPI (Pindamonhangaba College), UNESA and Dom Bosco Colleges in Resende, CEDERJ centers, ETEP Faculties (São José dos Campos and Taubaté), Bilac College, FACIC (Faculty of Humanities of Cruise), ESC (Higher School of Cruise) with graduation courses in Nursing, Physical Therapy and Bachelor of Physical Education, Bachelor and Degree, UBM (University of Barra Mansa), FAETERJ (Rio de Janeiro State College of Technological Education, linked to the Technical School Support Foundation, FAETEC) located in Barra Mansa, UNIFOA, Geraldo Di Biase University Center (UGB) and the FASF (Faculty Sul Fluminense) in Volta Redonda.

== See also ==
- São Paulo
- Rio de Janeiro
- Taubaté Basin
- Tremembé Formation
