= Barra Mansa =

- Municipality
- Municipality of Barra Mansa
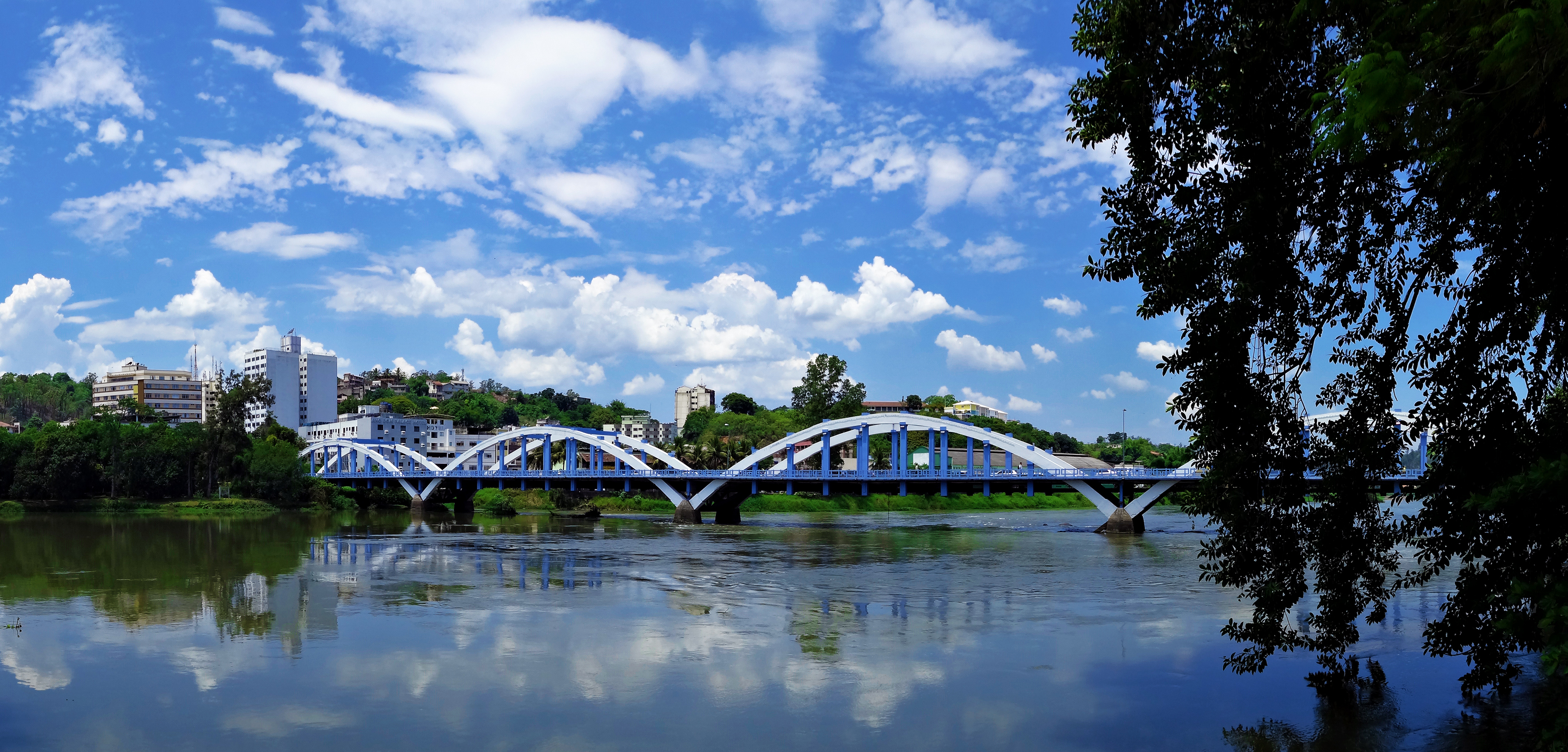
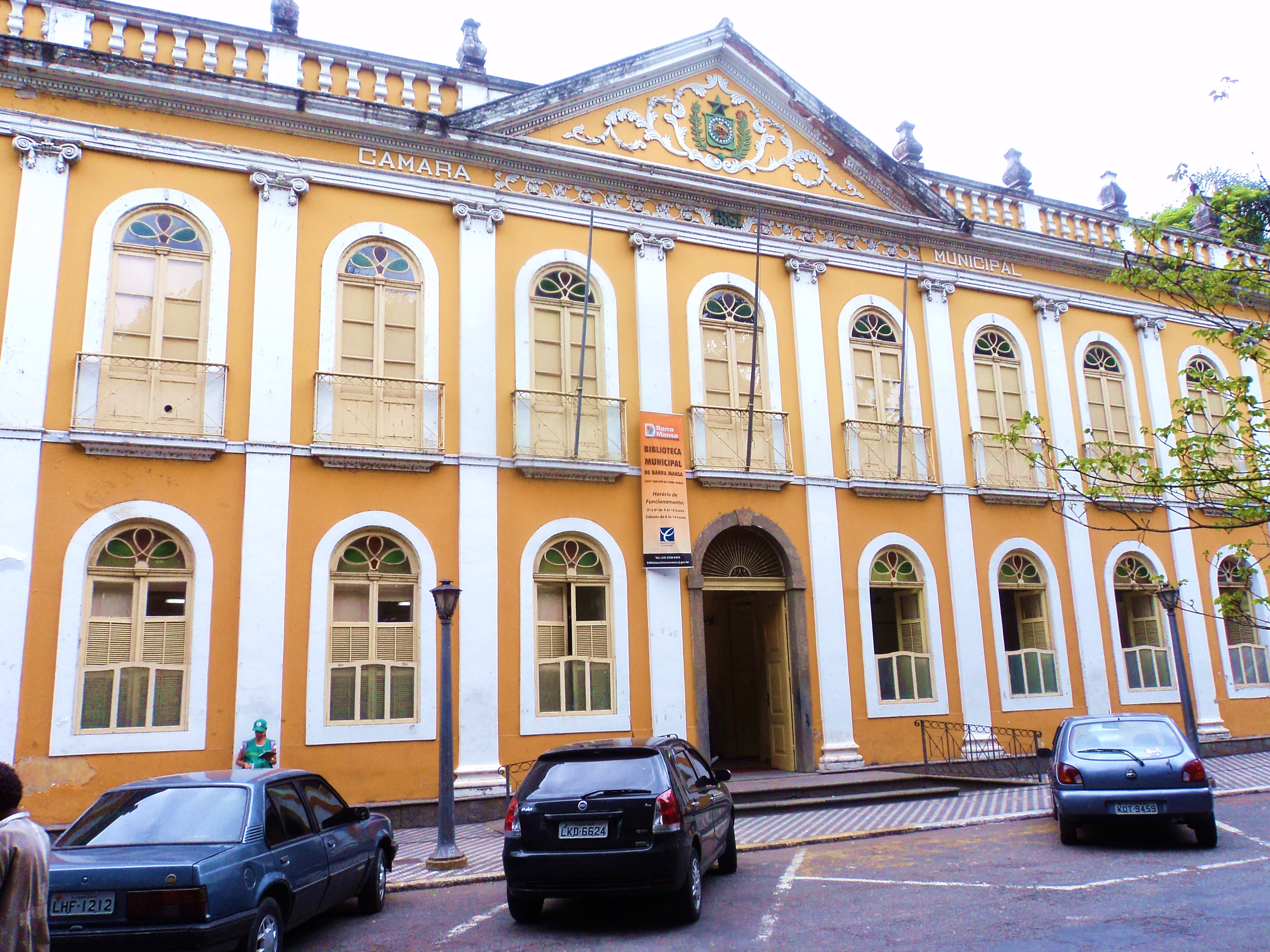
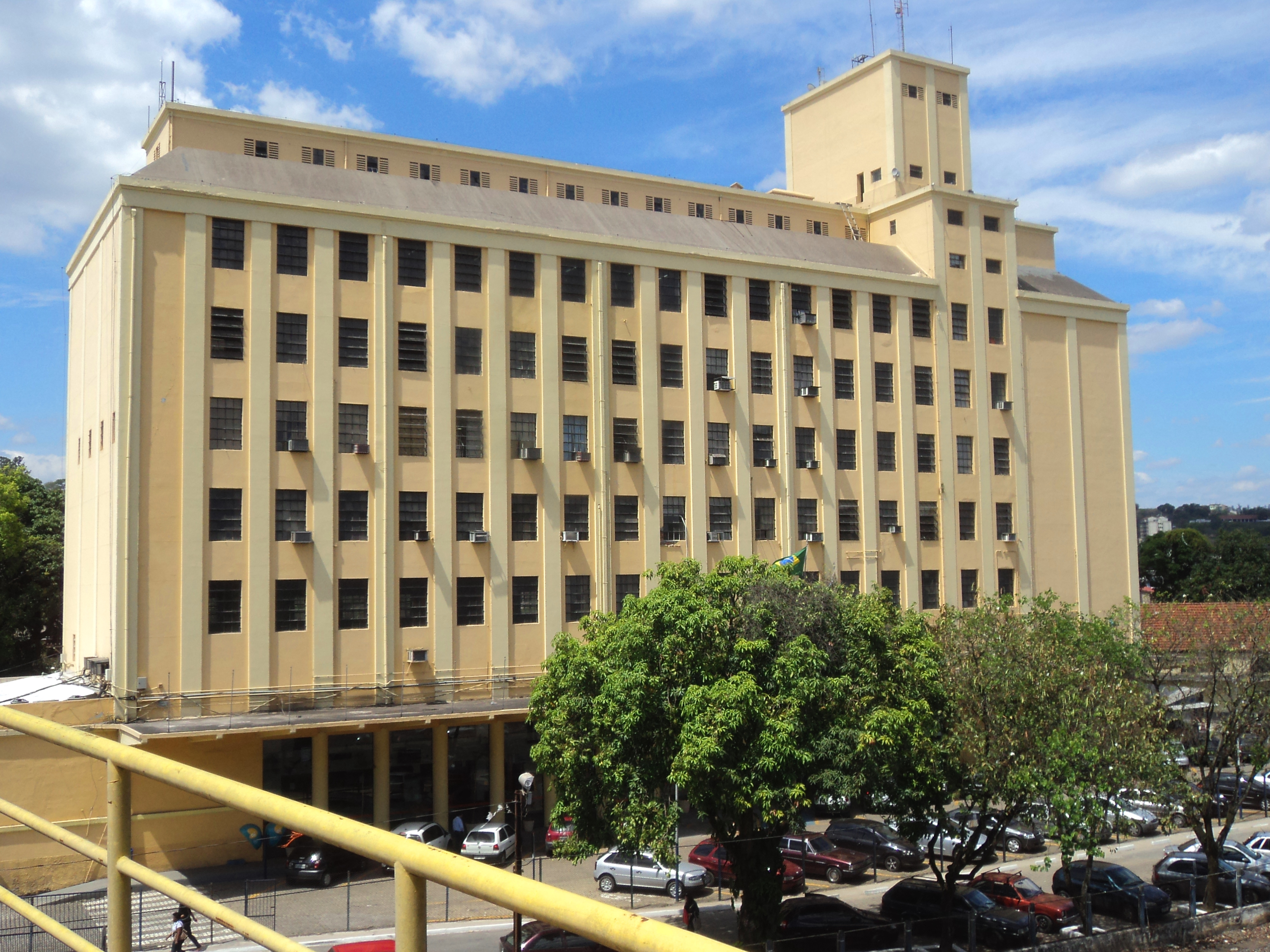
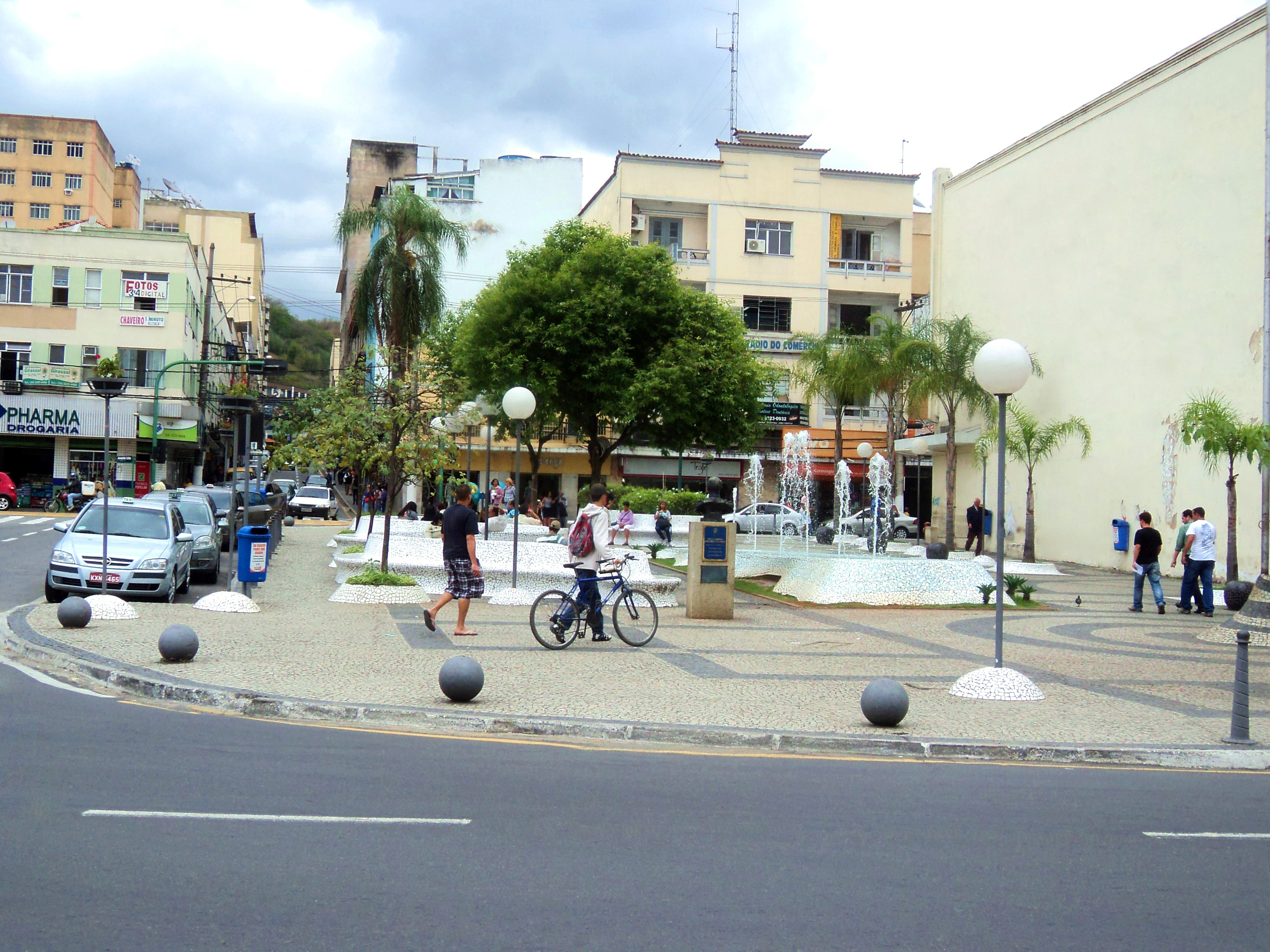
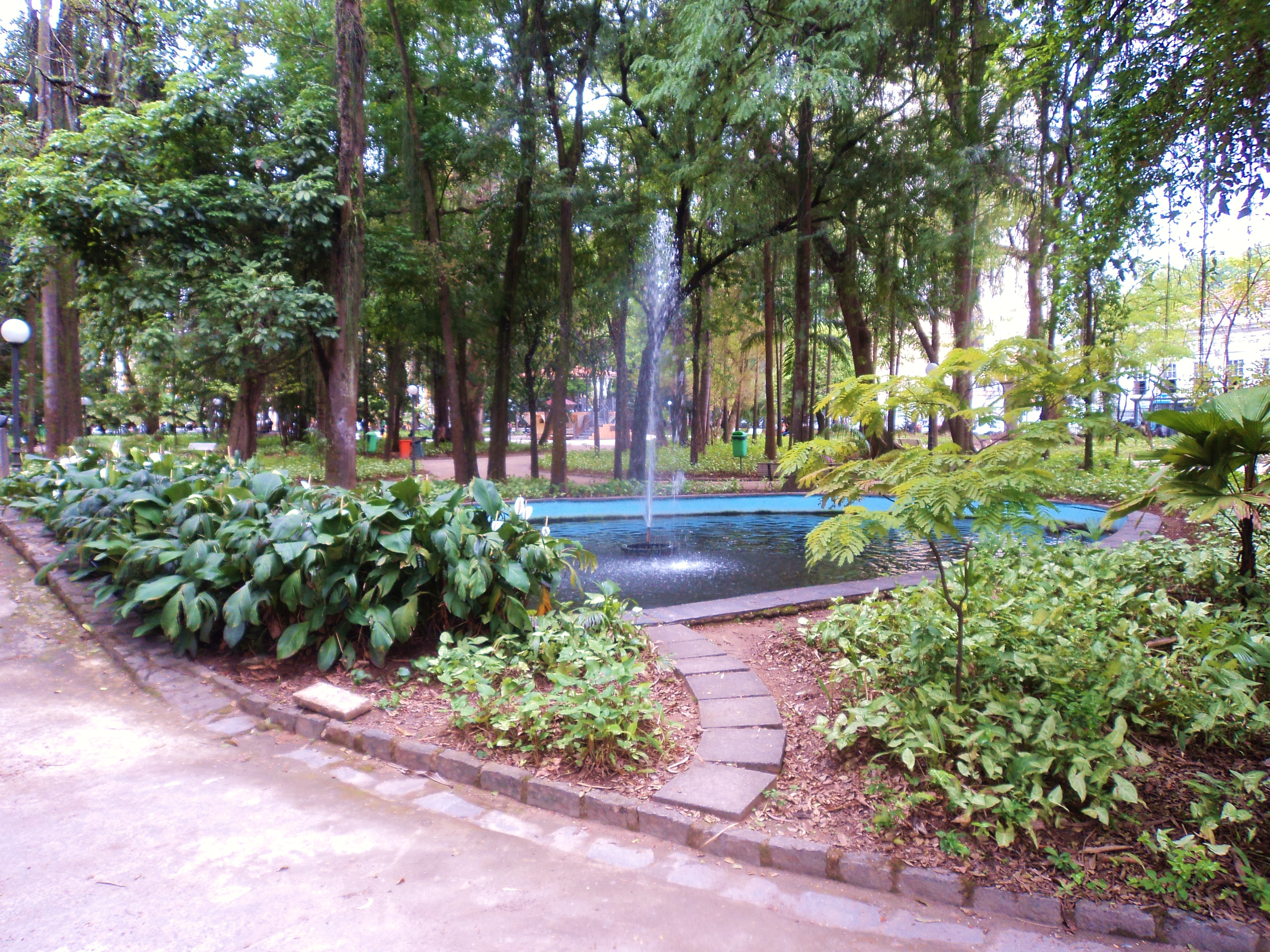
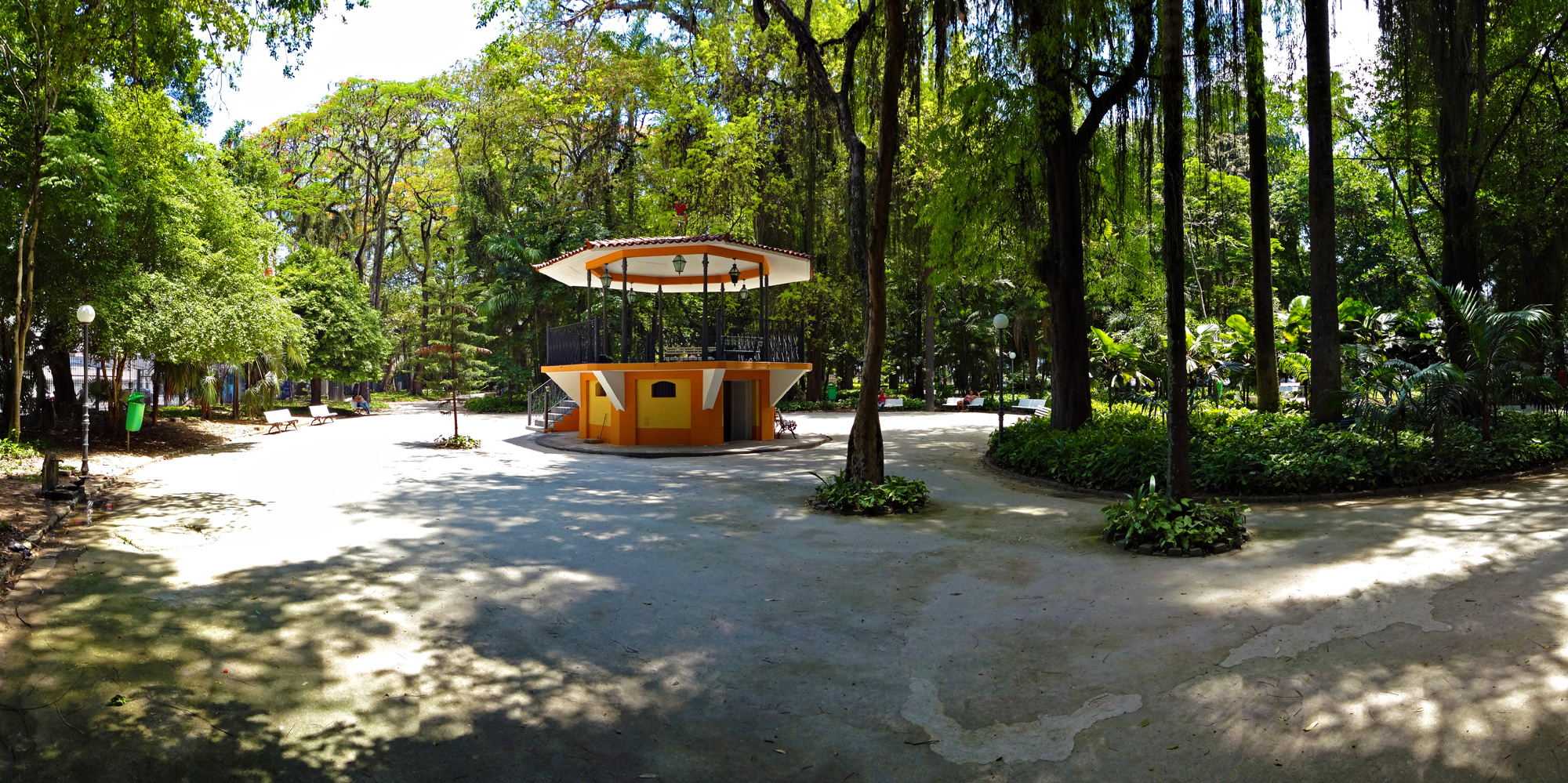

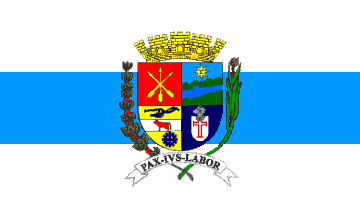
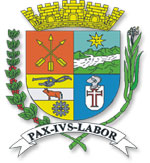
- Flag Coat of arms

- Location in Rio de Janeiro
- Coordinates: 22°32′38″S 44°10′15″W
- Country: Brazil
- Region: Southeast
- State: Rio de Janeiro
- Founded: 1832

Area
  - Total: 547.133 km^{2} (211.249 sq mi)
- Elevation: 389 m (1,276 ft)

Population (2022 Brazilian Census)
  - Total: 169,894
  - Estimate (2025): 181,679
  - Density: 310.517/km^{2} (804.235/sq mi)
- Time zone: UTC-3 (UTC-3)
  - Summer (DST): UTC-2 (UTC-2)
- Postal Code: 27355
- Area code: +55 24
- HDI (2010): 0.729 – high

Barra Mansa is a municipality located in the Brazilian state of Rio de Janeiro.

It is in the microregion of the Paraíba Valley, within the mesoregion of the South Fluminense. It is located at latitude 22º32'39 "south, longitude 44º10'17" west and altitude of 381 meters. Its estimated population in the 2022 Census was of 169,894 inhabitants, forming a conurbation with the cities of Volta Redonda and Pinheiral with a population of more than 450 thousand inhabitants. It has an area of 548.9 km^{2}.

The administrative and legislative center is in the Centro district. In it are located the city hall and the City Hall). The judicial center is the Barbará neighborhood, where the municipal forum is located.

In 1954 the district of Volta Redonda was emancipated and, in 1991, it was Quatis's turn, taking with him the districts of Ribeirão de São Joaquim and Falcão. In 1993 Antônio Rocha was elevated to the condition of district, as well as the district Santa Rita de Cássia, in 2006.

The population of Barra Mansa is made up of descendants of European immigrants (mainly Portuguese, Italian, and Spanish), but also French and German, as well as a dynamic Syrian-Lebanese colony, as well as Amerindians and African descendants.

The municipality has the second largest population of the South Fluminense mesoregion, has more than 528 industrial units, a large rail, road and river junction. It is located in a privileged area, close to the two largest Brazilian cities: Rio de Janeiro and São Paulo. It is also close to regional economic centers such as São José dos Campos, Juiz de Fora and Volta Redonda. Barra Mansa has a per capita income above the national average of R $13,956.15 [5], and has a Human Development Index (HDI) considered high by the United Nations Development Program (UNDP) of 0.806 (year 2000). It is sixth in the ranking of best Human Development Index (HDI-M) among the municipalities of Rio de Janeiro.

Barra Mansa has a strong and traditional shopping center, vital to the municipality's economy.

Around 1700, arriving in São Paulo was an almost impossible task, because of the natural barrier created by the Serra do Mar. But for the trip to become faster, the governor Luís Vaía Monteiro ordered a way through the Itaguaí mountain range.

After completing the route, several incursions were made to the Paraíba do Sul River, but without the commitment to form villages or towns. These incursions were almost always made up of adventurers looking for gold. The first clue to settlement occurred in 1764 when Francisco Gonçalves de Carvalho obtained with the viceroy D. Antônio Álvares da Cunha a sesmaria to found a farm of cattle and supplies (Fazenda da Posse) between the Paraíba River of the South and the river Bananal, exactly in the place where there was a stream called Barra Seca or Barra Mansa.

In 1764, the Vice King of Brazil, Antônio Álvares da Cunha, granted a sesmaria to the farmer Francisco Gonçalves de Carvalho. Thus was born in these lands the first building of the Vila de São Sebastião da Barra Mansa. Built on the banks of the Barra Mansa River and the Paraíba do Sul River, the Posse farm, dating from 1768.

The Barão de Guapi Palace is a historical building of Barra Mansa that received illustrious people like the Princess Isabel. Already hosted the City Hall and the City Hall. It currently houses the Library. In 1765, José Alberto Monteiro also obtained from the viceroy a sesmaria on the bank of the Paraíba River, where it is today the city of Volta Redonda. Over the years, these sesmarias were changed owners, until, around 1827, they arrived, by inheritance, at the hands of Colonel Custódio Ferreira Leite, the Baron of Aiuruoca, founder of the municipality. From there, the site became the obligatory point of passage of troops of travelers on the way to seaports. In 1800, in the lands of Henrique Magalhães, very near the mouth of the river Barra Mansa, already existed a mill and a chapel. Gradually, a small population nucleus began to emerge and the beginning of the settlement encouraged Colonel Custódio Ferreira Leite, who had another chapel built on the right bank of the Paraíba, also dedicated to São Sebastião, located almost in front of Fazenda Ano Bom, on the opposite bank of the river.

The small village grew and on October 3, 1832, thanks to a letter addressed to the General Legislative Assembly of the Empire, the village of São Sebastião de Barra Mansa was created, becoming part of the village dismembered lands of the neighboring Resende, Valença and St. John Mark. In 1954, due to a political maneuver, it had emancipated the until then district of Santo Antônio de Volta Redonda and in 1991 the districts of Quatis, Falcão and Ribeirão de São Joaquim.

== Geography ==
The municipality of Barra Mansa covers an area of 548.90 km^{2} (211.93 sq mi) and is located on the banks of the Paraíba do Sul River, in the Médio Vale do Paraíba region of Rio de Janeiro, between the Serra do Mar and Serra da Mantiqueira mountains.

Barra Mansa borders 8 municipalities, one of which is in the state of São Paulo

- Valença - North
- Quatis - North and West
- Resende - West
- Porto Real - West
- Bananal, in São Paulo - South
- Rio Claro - South
- Volta Redonda - East
- Barra do Piraí - East

According to the Brazilian Institute of Geography and Statistics - IBGE, the population censused in 2022 was 169,899 inhabitants.

The largest steel mill in Latin America, Companhia Siderúrgica Nacional (CSN), is in its conurbation, located in the municipality of Volta Redonda.

The municipality has a significant river basin and is served by the country's most important railway line (MRS Logística and VLI Logística). In addition, it has an excellent road system, which connects it to the main capitals and cities in the Southeast Region. The Presidente Dutra highway (BR-116) is its central axis.

The municipality has a central geographical position, located 120 kilometers from the city of Rio de Janeiro, 300 kilometers from São Paulo, 460 kilometers from Belo Horizonte, 650 kilometers from Espírito Santo, 85 kilometers from the port of Angra dos Reis and 90 kilometers from the port of Sepetiba, in the municipality of Itaguaí.

== Chronology of historical events ==
- In 1768, the construction of the first construction of Barra Mansa is made the farm of the Posse;
- In 1860, Barra Mansa was the largest producer of coffee in the country;
- In 1861, the Barão do Guapi Palace was erected;
- In 1874, the Barão do Guapi Palace won a large garden that is now the Centennial Park;
- Around 1870, the Barao do Guapi Palace was considered the best chamber in the entire province;
- In 1871, Barra Mansa was visited by Princess Isabel daughter of D. Pedro II, and also her husband Conde d'Eu for the Inauguration of the Railway Station;
- In 1908, Barra Mansa set up the first soccer club in the region, the Barra Mansa Futebol Clube;
- In 1911, Barra Mansa Futebol Clube became the first professional club in Brazil;
- In the 1930s, Barra Mansa was the country's largest milk producer, with five hundred thousand liters;
- In 1937, Barra Mansa inaugurated the first two metallurgical industries of the region: Siderúrgica de Barra Mansa and Companhia Metallurgica de Barbará;
- In 1946, Barra Mansa was the first city in southern Rio to encourage basketball, thanks to the encouragement of Nelson Geraidine, the founder of the court of the Baron de Aiuruoca school;
- In 1962, Barra Mansa was the fourth largest dairy producer in the world
