= Volta Redonda =

- Municipality
- Municipality of Volta Redonda
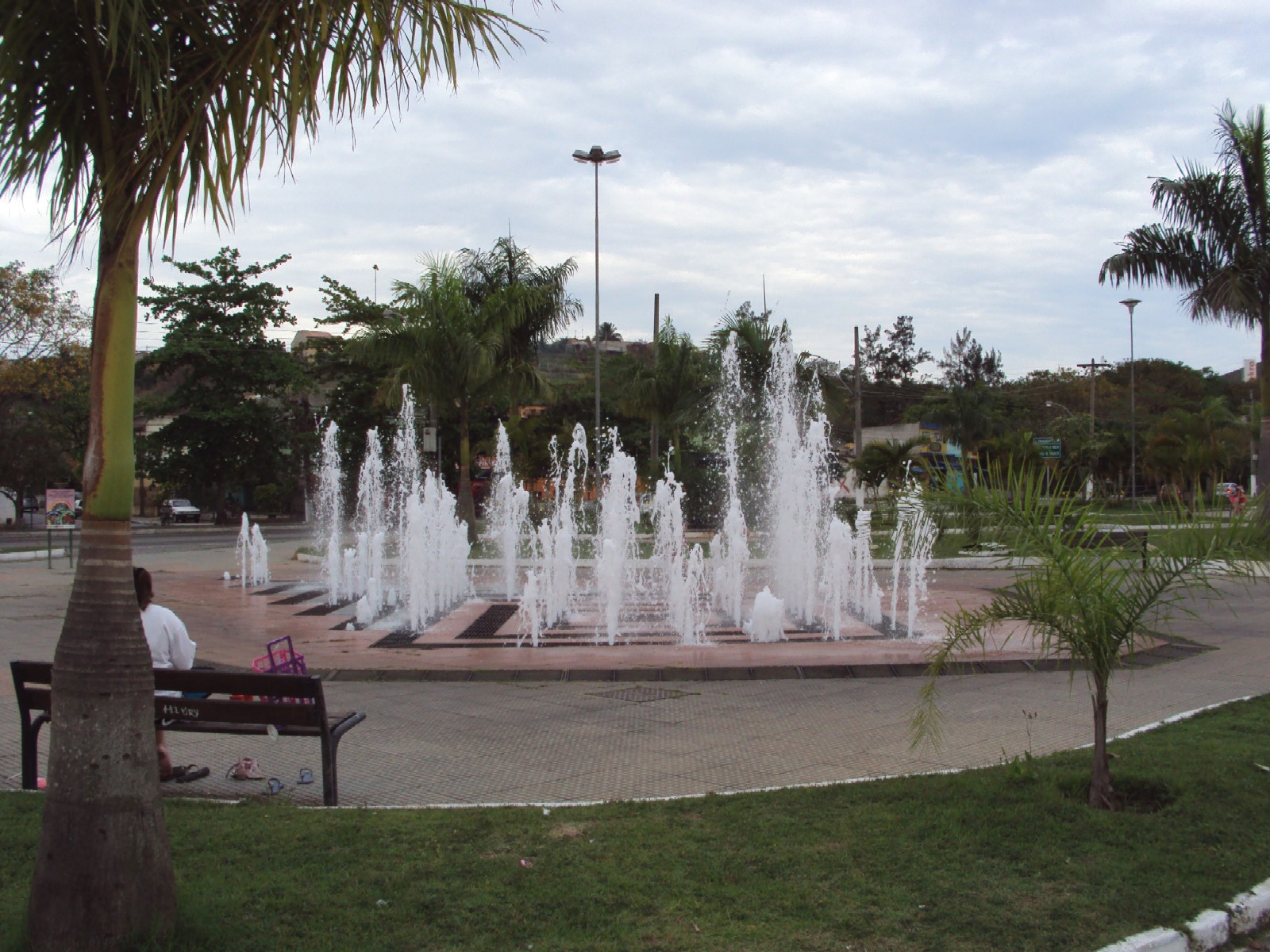
- Oscar Cardoso square

- Flag Coat of arms
- Nickname: Cidade do Aço ("City of Steel")
- Motto: Flumen Fulmini Flexit ("The River Bent Before the Lightning")
- Coordinates: 22°31′22″S 44°06′14″W
- Country: Brazil
- Region: Southeast
- State: Rio de Janeiro
- Founded: July 17, 1954

Government
  - Mayor: Antônio Francisco Neto (Progressistas) (2025–2029)

Area
  - Total: 182.483 km^{2} (70.457 sq mi)
- Elevation: 390 m (1,280 ft)

Population (2022 Brazilian census)
  - Total: 261,563
  - Estimate (2025): 279,971
  - Density: 1,433.36/km^{2} (3,712.37/sq mi)
- Time zone: UTC-3 (UTC-3)

Volta Redonda (Portuguese pronunciation: [ˈvɔwtɐ ʁeˈdõdɐ]) is a municipality in the Rio de Janeiro state of Brazil with an area of 182.81 km^{2}, located from 350m to 707m above the sea level (22°31'23" S, 44°06'15" W) and with a population of 261,563 inhabitants (2022 census). The area around the city has nearly 700,000 km^{2}. Its name (which is Portuguese for Round Turn) is due to the round shape of a curve in the Paraíba do Sul river around which the city was built.

Situated in Volta Redonda is Companhia Siderúrgica Nacional (CSN), Brazil's second largest steel producer. Today its economy, despite still being based on industry, is quite diverse, and largely focused on the areas of services and trade. Due to this, Volta Redonda is worldly known as Cidade do Aço (which is Portuguese for City of Steel).

The city borders with the municipalities of Barra Mansa (north, northwest, west and southwest), Barra do Piraí (northeast), Pinheiral, Piraí (south and east), and Rio Claro (south) and is 130 km from the city of Rio de Janeiro.

Along with the municipalities of Barra Mansa and Pinheiral, it is a conurbation of over 500,000 inhabitants, according to the IBGE estimates for 2008, and the state's largest urban spot outside the metropolitan region of Rio de Janeiro.

Economical center of the South Fluminense region, Volta Redonda is a strategic area, close to major hub cities in other regional states, such as Juiz de Fora (190 kilometers) and Sao Jose dos Campos (220 kilometers).

== History ==
In 1744, the first explorers named the curious curve of the Paraíba do Sul river "Volta Redonda". Big farms were installed in the region and nowadays some farm names are the names of some districts.

Between the years of 1860 and 1870, the navigation through the Paraíba do Sul river had its golden period between the cities of Resende and Barra do Piraí and at the same time the railroad D. Pedro II was built in Barra do Piraí and Barra Mansa.

With this, in 1875, the village of Santo Antonio de Volta Redonda started to have great impulse, but with the freedom of slaves in 1888, the decay of the Vale do Paraíba became visible, destroying the agriculture, which would never recover in a very satisfactory way.

Ceremony of installation of the Municipality of Volta Redonda, 1955. National Archives of Brazil.

This situation would be reversed in 1941, when the cycle of industrialization of Volta Redonda began. Chosen as site for installing the Companhia Siderúrgica Nacional (CSN) steel mill in the middle of World War II, it marked the base of Brazilian industrialization. Laborers from diverse regions of the country came to Volta Redonda to work in the mill. When it opened in 1946, it was the first steel mill in South America.

A symbol of national pride, the Volta Redonda mill embodied the protectionist policies that prevailed in Latin American economies between World War II and the Latin American debt crisis in the 1980s. Since its 1993 privatization, however, the mill — now known as the Presidente Vargas Steelworks — has transcended its dirigiste origins to become one of the world's most efficient steel production facilities. Due to its extensive refinement of steel and other minerals, the city is globally nicknamed "Cidade do Aço" (literal Portuguese for "City of Steel").

== Politics and government ==
Volta Redonda's mayor (Portuguese: prefeito) is currently Antônio Francisco Neto of the Progressistas party, elected in 2020 to serve a four-year term. The 21-member council (Portuguese: Câmara Municipal) was elected at the same time.

== Geography ==
According to the regional division in force since 2017, established by the IBGE, the municipality belongs to the Intermediate and Immediate Geographic Regions of Volta Redonda-Barra Mansa. Until then, with the divisions into microregions and mesoregions in force, it was part of the microregion of Vale do Paraíba Fluminense, which in turn was included in the mesoregion of Sul Fluminense.

The city is bordered by the municipalities of Barra Mansa (North, Northwest, West and Southwest), Barra do Piraí (Northeast), Pinheiral and Piraí (Southeast and East), and Rio Claro (South). Together with the municipalities of Barra Mansa (7 km away) and Pinheiral (15 km away), it constitutes an agglomeration with over 460 thousand inhabitants, according to estimates by the Brazilian Institute of Geography and Statistics for 2009.

== Education ==
In the second half of the 20th century, the city received the boost of technological and higher educational development when in 1961 the Industrial Engineering and Metallurgical Volta Redonda of Fluminense Federal University who later brought more courses the city with the Institute of Exact Sciences and Institute Humanities and Social Sciences, or also higher education institutions University Center or Geraldo Di Biase - UGB, University Centre of Barra Mansa - UBM and University Center of Volta Redonda - UniFOA was created. In the 2000s, the Federal Institute of Rio de Janeiro was launched with technological and industrial emphasis.

== Sports ==
Volta Redonda Futebol Clube is the most important football club of the city, playing its home matches at Estádio Raulino de Oliveira, which is also located in the city downtown.
