= Mesoregion =

Mesoregion is a unit of intermediate territorial subdivision, between "microregion" and "macroregion". The term may refer to:

- Mesoregion (Brazil), a statistical subdivision of Brazil
- Mesoregion (geomorphology), a geomorphological unit
- Mesoregion (geography), a geographical unit
- Mesoregions of Mexico
