= Pereira Passos =

Brazilian politician and engineer (1836–1913)

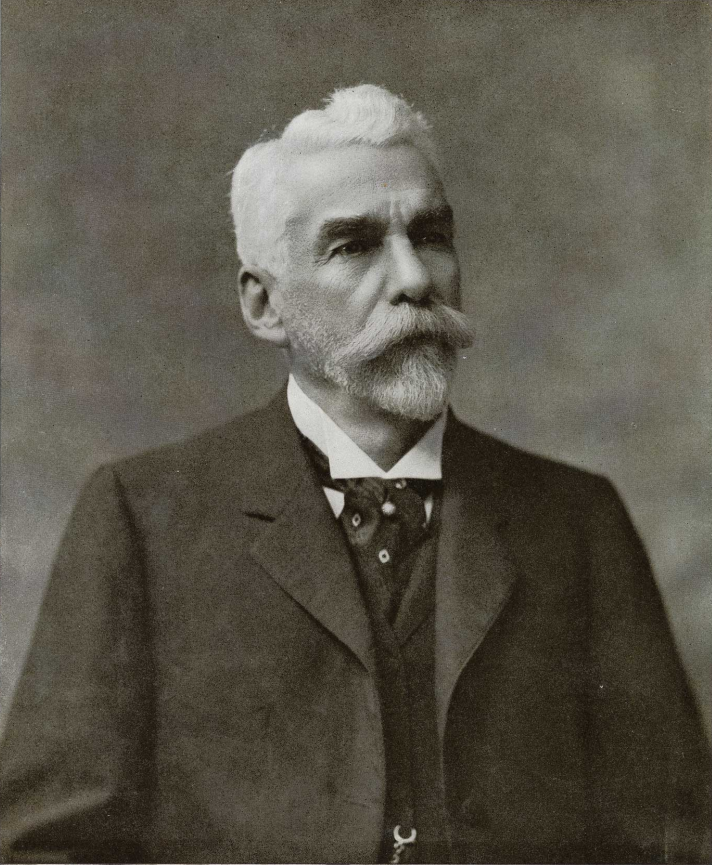

Mayor of the Federal District
- In office 30 December 1902 – 16 November 1906
- Preceded by: Carlos Leite Ribeiro
- Succeeded by: Sousa Aguiar

Personal details
- Born: Francisco Pereira Passos; 29 August 1836 São João Marcos, Rio de Janeiro, Brazil
- Died: 12 March 1913 (aged 76) Rio de Janeiro, Federal District, Brazil
- Spouse: Maria Rita César de Andrade (m. 1865; died 1912)
- Children: 4
- Education: Military School; École des ponts et chaussées
- Profession: Civil engineer

Francisco Pereira Passos (29 August 1836 – 12 March 1913) was a Brazilian civil engineer and politician. He was mayor of the Federal District of Brazil from 1902 to 1906, nominated by President Rodrigues Alves. During his tenure, Pereira Passos promoted a large-scale urban renewal plan for Rio, inspired by Georges-Eugène Haussmann's renewal of Paris.

== Biography ==
Passos was son of Antônio Pereira Passos, Barão de Mangaratiba, and Clara Oliveira. Until the age of fourteen he was raised at the Bálsamo Farm, in São João Marcos, currently Rio Claro district, in the state of Rio de Janeiro. In March 1852 he joined the then Military School, now the Polytechnic School of the Federal University of Rio de Janeiro — former University of Brazil where he graduated in 1856 as a Bachelor in Physical and Mathematical Sciences, which gave him the Diploma of civil engineer. He was a classmate of Benjamin Constant.

He studied in France from 1857 to the end of 1860, where he attended the urban reform of Paris promoted by Georges-Eugène Haussmann. His stay in Paris had a profound influence on Passos, who was to devote himself to railway engineering and urban planning.

On his return to Brazil in 1860, Pereira Passos dedicates himself to the construction and expansion of the Brazilian railway network, under the demand of the coffee economy. He participated in the construction of the Santos–Jundiaí Railroad (1867), the extension of the D. Pedro II Railroad to the São Francisco River (1868), and technical consultant to the Ministry of Agriculture and Public Works (1870).

He returned to Europe in 1871, in the company of the Baron of Mauá, as inspector of the Imperial Government. In Europe, he studied European rail systems and was inspired by the Swiss railroad which climbed Mount Righi with slopes of up to 20%, to run the railway extension to Petrópolis. System that would still be used later in the first tourist railrway of Brazil, Corcovado Railway. He directed at the same time the Arsenal of Ponta da Areia, at the invitation of the Baron of Mauá, producing rails and wagons.

He was appointed engineer of the Ministry of the Empire in 1874, and it is up to Pereira Passos to accompany all the works of the imperial government. He was part of the commission that was to present the city's overall urban reform plan, including widening streets, building major avenues, channeling rivers among other urban and sanitary measures. The survey carried out from 1875 to 1876 would be the basis of the future master plan of the city, put into practice in the administration of Passos as mayor.

He returned to Europe in 1880 and remained in Paris until 1881. In the meantime he attended courses at the Sorbonne and the Collège de France, visiting factories, steel mills, transport companies and public works in Europe. Still in 1881 he became a consultant for Compagnie Générale de Chemins de Fer Brésiliens, to accompany the construction of a railway line in Paraná, linking the Port of Paranaguá to Curitiba.

On his return to Brazil, he moved to Paraná and only after the railroad was inaugurated in 1882, he returned to the capital. On his return, he assumed the chairmanship of Companhia Ferro-Carril de São Cristóvão, replacing the Viscount of Taunay. After restructuring the company, in 1884, Pereira Passos proposes to the shareholders the acquisition of the Italian project Giuseppe Fogliani, for the construction of a great avenue. Despite the shareholders' approval and the construction license obtained, the project did not go out of print. However, this would be more an anticipation of what would come to occur in his management as mayor 20 years later: the opening of Avenida Central.

== Mayor ==
Appointed mayor by President Rodrigues Alves, Pereira Passos promoted a great urban reform in the city, with the goal of transforming it into a modern French-style capital, a "Tropical Paris".

Inspired by the Haussmann reforms, in four years Pereira Passos transformed the city's appearance: the "cortiços" (insalubrious tenements) and the narrow, dark streets, were demolished, with large boulevards and buildings in their place. Some of the works made in his tenure are the opening of Avenida Central (currently Avenida Rio Branco), Avenida Beira-Mar and Avenida Atlântica, the modernizing of the Port of Rio de Janeiro and the beginning of the construction of the Municipal Theater. Passos' reforms and demolitions became known as the "Bota Abaixo" (Knock-it-down).

=== Social aspects ===
Despite improvements in sanitation and urban development, Pereira Passos's plan entailed a high social cost, with the beginning of formation of favelas in the city.

The reform promoted a great valorization of the soil in the central area, still partially occupied by the low income population. About 1,600 old residential buildings were demolished. As a result of these demolitions, the poor population of the city center was forced to live with other families, to pay high rents or to move to the suburbs, since the popular housing constructed to replace the demolished ones was insufficient. A large part of the immense population affected by the remodeling remained in the region and the hills located in the center of the city - Providência, Santo António, among others - once little inhabited, suffer a rapid occupation of the proletarian housing. The favelas appear, that would mark the configuration of the city until the present day.

== Death ==
Pereira Passos died on March 12, 1913, boarding the ocean liner Araguaia, on a trip to France.
