= Historical region =

Historical regions (or historical areas) are geographical regions that had a cultural, ethnic, linguistic, or political significance as distinct entities at some point in recorded history, regardless of latter-day borders and administrative divisions. There are some historical regions that can be considered as "active", for example: Moravia, which is held by the Czech Republic, is both a recognized contemporary region of the country as well as a historical one. They are used as delimitations for studying and analysing social development of period-specific cultures without any reference to contemporary political, economic or social organisations.

The fundamental principle underlying this view is that older political and mental structures exist which exercise greater influence on the spatial-social identity of individuals than is understood by the contemporary world, bound to and often blinded by its own worldview - e.g. the focus on the nation-state.

Definitions of regions vary, and regions can include macroregions such as Europe, territories of traditional sovereign states or smaller microregional areas. Geographic proximity is generally the required precondition for the emergence of a regional identity. In Europe, regional identities are often derived from the Migration Period but for the contemporary era are also often related to the territorial transformations that followed World War I and those that followed the Cold War.

Some regions are entirely invented, such as the Middle East, which was popularised in 1902 by a military strategist, Alfred Thayer Mahan, to refer to the area of the Persian Gulf.

== See also ==
- Ancient regions of Anatolia
- List of regions of ancient Armenia
- Presidencies and provinces of British India
- List of historical regions of Central Europe
- Greece (Ancient / Geographic)
- List of historical states of Italy
- Polish historical regions
- Borders of the Roman Empire
- Historical regions of Romania
- Historical regions in present-day Ukraine
- Historical regions of the United States
