= Cultural regions of Belarus =

Map of the cultural regions of Belarus (following Tsitou's ideas), superimposed over the administrative Regions of Belarus

The cultural regions of Belarus are historical and ethnographic areas that are located within the boundaries of what is now Belarus and are distinguished by a set of ethnocultural features: ethnic history, settlement pattern, economic activities and tools used, folk architecture, arts and crafts, traditional clothing, folklore, and local dialect.

According to Viktor Tsitou, these are the ethnographic regions of Belarus:

- Belarusian Dvina Region (Belarusian: Паазер’е, romanized: Paazierje, or Belarusian: Падзвінне, romanized: Padźvińnie)
- Belarusian Dnieper Region (Belarusian: Беларускае Падняпроўе, romanized: Biełaruskaje Padniaproŭje)
- Central Belarus (Belarusian: Цэнтральная Беларусь, romanized: Centralnaja Biełaruś)
- Upper Neman Region (Belarusian: Панямонне, romanized: Paniamońnie)
- Western Polesie and Eastern Polesie (Belarusian: Заходняе Палессе, romanized: Zachodniaje Paleśsie and Belarusian: Усходняе Палессе, romanized: Uschodniaje Paleśsie, respectively)

Researchers contest the definitions of these regions. In the case of Padzvinne, Belarusian historian Vladzimir Auseichyk disputes its existence as a unified region, arguing instead that there are two distinct regions in that area.
