= National Civil Aviation Agency of Brazil =

Brazilian civil aviation authority

Agência Nacional de Aviação Civil

Agency overview
- Formed: September 2005, 27; 21 years ago
- Preceding agency: Civil Aviation Department
- Jurisdiction: Brazil
- Headquarters: Edificio Parque Cidade Corporate Setor Comercial Sul Quadra 9 Asa Sul, Brasília, Brazil, 70308-200
- Agency executive: Tiago Chagas Faierstein, President-Director
- Parent agency: Ministry of Ports and Airports
- Website: www.gov.br/anac/pt-br

The National Civil Aviation Agency (Portuguese: Agência Nacional de Aviação Civil, ANAC) is the Brazilian civil aviation authority, created in 2005. It is headquartered in the Edifício Parque Cidade Corporate in Brasília. A part of the Brazilian Secretariat of Civil Aviation, the agency raised from the former Department of Civil Aviation (DAC) and the Civil Aviation Certification Division (Aeronautical Technical Center - CTA), the Brazilian aircraft certification authority. ANAC is responsible for regulating and overseeing civil aviation activities, aeronautics and aerodromes infrastructure.

== History ==
In practical terms, much of what is now ANAC, especially in the cities of Rio de Janeiro and São José dos Campos, was formed from several organisms belonging to the Aeronautics Command: the Department of Civil Aviation (DAC) and its Services (SERAC), the Institute of Sciences of the Physical Activity of the Aeronautics (ICAF), the Institute of Civil Aviation (IAC) and the division of Civil Aviation Certification of the Institute of Development and Industrial Coordination.

The agency was created by Federal Law No. 11,182 of September 27, 2005 and instantiated through Federal Decree No. 5,731 of March 20, 2006.

Since its inception in 2005, the agency has had six presiding directors:

- pt:Milton Zuanazzi (20 Mar 2006-31 Oct 2007),
- pt:Denise Abreu,
- Solange Paiva Vieira (11 Dec 2007-17 Mar 2011),
- Carlos Eduardo Pellegrino (interim),
- Marcelo Pacheco dos Guaranys,
- José Ricardo Botelho (August 2015).

== Legal status and organisation ==
The ANAC is a federal regulatory agency. The body has the legal status of special autarchy, linked to the Ministry of Transport, Ports and Civil Aviation, which means that, legally, the body has more administrative and financial autonomy than a body directly linked to the direct administration of the federal government.

One of its prerogatives is to regulate itself internally, setting its own organization chart autonomously.

The ANAC is organized from a Collegiate Board of Directors with four Directors and one Chief Executive Officer. Its members are nominated periodically to serve a normally five-year term. Linked to the Board of Executive Officers there are advisors and superintendencies that regulate activities essential to the operation of the agency.

The superintendencies related to the organisational areas of the agency are those that effectively perform the regulation, and are each linked to one of the four Directors: the Superintendency of Operational Standards, the Superintendency of Airport Infrastructure, the Airworthiness Superintendency and the Superintendency of Economic Regulation and Market Monitoring. The first three perform technical regulation; the latter, economic regulation.

In terms of physical structure, ANAC has several buildings spread throughout Brazil, mainly its headquarters in Brasília - DF, and the four regional units: Rio de Janeiro, São Paulo, Porto Alegre and Recife. It also has a unit in São José dos Campos, a training center at Jacarepaguá Airport and a civil aviation office in Curitiba.

== Responsibilities ==
The Brazilian civil aircraft fleet is one of the largest around the world, with more than 10,000 units flying. The executive helicopters fleet is the second one, most of them operating in the city of São Paulo. ANAC is the agency that regulates their concessions and operations. ANAC also regulates the concessions of Brazilian airlines, such as TAM Airlines, VRG Airlines (which includes the brands Gol Airlines and Varig), Azul Brazilian Airlines, Avianca Brasil, TRIP Linhas Aéreas, Passaredo Linhas Aéreas, among others.

ANAC also regulates the maximum number of operations (slots) in some airports due to capacity limitations. Presently they are:

- São Paulo-Congonhas Airport with 30 operations an hour
- São Paulo/Guarulhos-Gov. Franco Montoro International Airport with 45 operations an hour.
- Rio de Janeiro-Galeão/Antonio Carlos Jobim Internanational Airport
- Rio de Janeiro-Santos Dumont Airport
- Brasília-Pres. Juscelino Kubitschek International Airport

On March 16, 2010, ANAC announced that similar slot restrictions, particularly on peak hours will be implemented in 2010 at the following airports:

- Belo Horizonte/Confins-Pres. Tancredo Neves International Airport
- Brasília-Pres. Juscelino Kubitschek International Airport (Implemented)
- Campinas-Viracopos Airport
- Cuiabá-Marechal Rondon International Airport
- Fortaleza-Pinto Martins International Airport
- Salvador-Dep. Luís Eduardo Magalhães International Airport

== Significant events ==
The 2006–07 Brazilian aviation crisis embroiled the ANAC, and the courts subsequently condemned it along with seven other parties.

On 17 June 2007, pt:Voo TAM 3054 crashed with all humans lost. pt:Denise Abreu was then the head of the ANAC, and as such was constituted by the court a civil party, due in part to the autonomous legal status of the ANAC.

In May 2009, Air France Flight 447 was lost at sea. ANAC was the Brazilian agency to which fell the investigation.

On 27 November 2016, ANAC did not approve the flight plan proposed by the Bolivian company Lamia to transport The Chapecoense Brazilian football team in a direct chartered flight from Brazil to Medellín. ANAC based its decision on the international aeronautical legislation, according to which a chartered flight must be operated by a company based either in the country of origin or the country of destiny of the flight intended. The soccer team reached Bolivia via a regular commercial flight, and then departed to Medellín from the Viru Viru Airport, in Bolivia, in a flight operated by Lamia. There was a crash with 71 dead and only 6 survivors.

In 2017, ANAC authorized the airlines to charge for the transportation of passengers' luggage under the promise that such a measure would reduce ticket prices. However, in the period immediately following the release of the charge, between June and September 2017, prices were increased by 35.9%, according to FGV data. According to IBGE survey, however, the increase was more moderate, from 16.9%.

== See also ==
- Brazilian Organization for the Development of Aeronautical Certification
