= Brazilian Organization for the Development of Aeronautical Certification =

The Brazilian Organization for the Development of Aeronautical Certification (Organização Brasileira para o Desenvolvimento da Certificação Aeronáutica, DCA-BR) is a nonprofit organization (Organização da Sociedade Civil de Interesse Público, OSCIP), of public interest, regulated by Brazilian Law number 9.790 as of March 23, 1999, and registered at the Brazilian Ministry of Justice on November 28, 2006.

== Organization ==
DCA-BR, organized as an OSCIP (Civil Society Organization of Public Interest), officially started its activities on June 26, 2006. It can firm up partnership agreements with government and private entities, with national and foreign organizations.

DCA-BR activities range from training, professional qualification, consultancy, regulation, acting with aerospace authorities, manufacturers, agents and users of the Civil and Military aviation sectors.

Its activity encompasses, among others, the evaluation and orientation of aeronautical projects, since the conceptual design, through the airworthiness aspects, up to its certification, following the entire life cycle, into the operational phase with the Continued Airworthiness and Operational Safety, including yet questions related to noise, emissions and environmentally sustainable operations.

Among its goals, can be highlighted those related to the acquisition and dissemination of the knowledge and the experience accumulated in the process of implementing aeronautical and space certification systems, with international recognition, in emergent countries from Latin America and Asia, notably in Brazil.

DCA-BR also acts in support activities and consultancy for the implementation of Continued Safety Management Systems and individual and institutional delegation systems.

== Structure ==
DCA-BR is managed by a Board of Associated Members, distributed in the categories: Founders (signatories of the DCA-BR Act of Incorporation), Effective Members (the ones that plead for admission) and Honorary Members (personalities having public and official recognition for relevant services rendered to the Brazilian Aviation. Those however, do not have voting right).

DCA-BR is structured as follows:

General Board of Associates: Constituted by the associates having statutory voting rights, with decision power for election and destitution of positions like the managing directors, fiscal counseling and eventual alterations of the association by-laws.

Fiscal Counseling: Composed by three associates, with the main scope of analyzing the financial statements, balance sheets, and related activities.

Executive Directorate: The Executive Directorate is composed of three directors: a general director, a technical director and a financial and administrative director.

== Headquarters ==
DCA-BR has its headquarters in São José dos Campos, Brazilian main aeronautics and space center.

== Mission ==
The DCA-BR mission is to contribute for the development, disseminating and maintenance of knowledge acquired in certification, flight safety and environment protection, in the aeronautical and space fields.

Its objective is to preserve the knowledge obtained in the certification of aeronautical products in the last decades.

== Vision ==
The DCA-BR vision is to be recognized as a national and international reference as possessing and disseminating knowledge related to certification, flight safety and environmental protection, in the aeronautical and space fields, developing its activities in an autonomous and sustainable manner.

DCA-BR proposes to be a responsible organization for the preservation of the aeronautical certification knowledge, achieved through the support to the Brazilian aeronautical industry in the last decades. Moreover, the continuous development of DCA-BR may contribute as a strategic agent in the implementation and development of the Brazilian aeronautical complex.

== Performance areas ==
DCA-BR operates in many areas related to aeronautical certification.

=== Aeronautical certification consultancy ===
DCA-BR does not hold certification authority or delegation. Such activity is of exclusive responsibility of the Country's primary airworthiness authorities (in Brazil, ANAC for civil aviation, and CTA/IFI for the military and defense sectors). The organization's role is to perform consultancy on aeronautical products and projects, orienting aircraft and equipment certification, compliance methods and airworthiness regulations. It also offers advice on flight tests, experimental projects and is capable of addressing aircraft's performance aspects and aircraft's systems safety assessment.

DCA-BR offers consultancy on Brazilian Supplemental Type Certificate (STC) projects and the validation of foreign STCs in Brazil, besides Light-Sport Aircraft (LSA) projects.

DCA-BR also promotes the foment of the Unmanned Aerial Vehicles (UAVs) certification, through the promotion of discussion panels and advising manufacturers and government organizations.

=== Continued airworthiness ===
DCA-BR supports the development of maintenance programs, reliability and control programs, aircraft's systems safety assessment, spare parts provisioning programs and support to the preparation of company's certification manuals. Furthermore, it provides advice on packing and dangerous goods transportation.

=== Other consultancy ===
DCA-BR offers consultancy on many aeronautical subjects to private companies, governmental organizations and civil aviation authorities in Brazil and other countries.

Among various disciplines, are the design and operating requirements of Unmanned Aerial Vehicles (UAVs), Safety Management System (SMS), State Safety Program (SSP), Environmental Control Management, Quality Management Systems and production.

=== Training ===
DCA-BR performs trainings focusing several matters related to aviation, including courses such as aeronautical familiarization, aeronautical certification regulations and standards, predictive maintenance systems, aircraft systems, propulsion, structures and material fatigue, composite materials, aero elasticity, system safety assessment, aeronautical quality management, inspection, airworthiness certification, planning and organization of OJT (On-the-job training) systems.

=== Environment ===
DCA-BR collaborates with the Brazilian Technical Standards Association ABNT, in dedicated committees, aiming at the elaboration of NBR standards, issued by this ABNT, for the control and management of Greenhouse Effect Gases (GEG) by aircraft and in airports, advises on Clean Development Mechanisms for the replacement of fossil fuels with biofuels, performs GEG inventories and studies techniques for GEG emissions monitoring. The organization also dedicates itself to the study of renewable energy sources use in aviation. It is capable of preparing environment impact reports for airport installations.

As an organization dedicated to promote studies and discussions concerning the impact of aviation on the environment, it organizes Seminars and Workshops covering relevant environmental aspects for the aeronautical sector.

=== Quality and production ===
DCA-BR is able to provide aircraft inspection during production phases, performing quality audit, acceptance and airworthiness visits of new aircraft on behalf of purchasers, First Article Inspections (FAI) and other related inspection as an independent auditor. It offers technical advice regarding the import and export of aircraft and other aeronautical products.

It also provides audits upon suppliers, quality systems of production processes and witnesses acceptance tests.

== Employees ==
DCA-BR keeps in its ranks experienced professionals in subjects related to aerospace certification, airworthiness, operational safety management and environment protection. Most of them came from ANAC, EMBRAER, airlines and from the 'Instituto de Fomento e Coordenação Industrial'.

Having those specialists, engineers and instructors as its most important asset, DCA-BR is strongly committed with the operational safety and with the environment preservation in aviation, a commitment that it responds through the acquisition, maintenance and dissemination of knowledge and practices towards airworthiness, safety and environmental control management.

== Main customers and partners ==
The main customer of DCA-BR, currently, is ANAC, consisting fundamentally of the technical training and development of new and old Agency's employees, besides the specialized technical consultancy in products certification, operational safety and airworthiness regulation

DCA-BR undertakes negotiations with private companies and organizations of the public administration (Federal administration and local States), aiming at new partnerships and long-term, autonomous existence. Among on-going business, it can be mentioned several advisory for air transport companies, aircraft design offices, maintenance shops, training, and organization of specific workshops.

DCA-BR has been rendering advice to the organization of foreign certification authorities, having performed related activities in South Korea.

== Promoted events and training courses ==
=== History ===
DCA-BR has organized or assisted on the organization of many Seminars and specialized training courses. The organization of Workshops and training sessions is a continued activity for DCA-BR. Below, some among the most important events organized by DCA-BR.

- November 2007 – X Seminário de Representantes Credenciados da Autoridade Aeronáutica (Designated Representatives of Aeronautical Authority) – São José dos Campos - São Paulo
- June 2008 – UAV Regulations Panel - São José dos Campos - São Paulo
- June 2008 – UAV Seminar - São José dos Campos - São Paulo
- June 2008 – Aircraft Carbon Emissions Seminar – São José dos Campos - São Paulo
- July 2008 – Aircraft Major Modifications Seminar 2008 – São José dos Campos - São Paulo
- April 2009 – Treinamento Inicial para candidatos a Representantes Credenciados da Autoridade Aeronáutica (Initial training for applicant to Designated Representatives of Aeronautical Authority)– São José dos Campos – São Paulo
- April 2009 – Safety Assessment of Aircraft Systems Course - São José dos Campos – São Paulo
- June 2009 – Technical Meeting between IPEN and DCA-BR – Interaction Opportunities between Regulatory Agencies – São Paulo – São Paulo
- June 2009 –RTCA DO-178B and RTCA DO-254 Standards Application Course - São José dos Campos – São Paulo
- July 2009 – Aircraft Major Modifications Talk – EAB 2009 São José dos Campos – São Paulo
- July 2009 – Light Sport Aircraft (LSA) Talk – EAB 2009 - São José dos Campos – São Paulo
- July 2009 – Greenhouses Gases Emissions Reduction Initiatives Talk – AEB 2009 - São José dos Campos – São Paulo
- July 2009 – 2nd Flight Safety Symposium, together with the Divisão de Ensaios em Voo from Comando-Geral de Tecnologia Aeroespacial (CTA) – São José dos Campos - São Paulo
- September/2009 – Aircraft Major Modifications Seminar 2009 – São José dos Campos – São Paulo

=== Contests ===
DCA-BR seeks to promote the discussion and the interest of high school and college students towards aviation relevant subjects. One way to incentive students to develop knowledge in those areas, is the promotion of Contests, offering special Awards to the best works.

In 2009, DCA-BR is promoting two Contests, where the final results will be published on the indicated dates:

- December 2009 – UAV Research Prize - São José dos Campos - São Paulo
- December 2009 – 1st College Students Contest about Environmental Impact Reductions Initiatives in the Aerospace Sector – São José dos Campos - São Paulo

== Associations ==
DCA-BR is associated to the following organizations:

- ASTM International
- RTCA – Radio Technical Commission for Aeronautics
- SAE – Society of Automotive Engineers International
- ABNT – Associação Brasileira de Normas Técnicas
- UVS International

== See also ==
- Organização da Sociedade Civil de Interesse Público
- Agência Nacional de Aviação Civil
