= Solange Paiva Vieira =

Brazilian economist

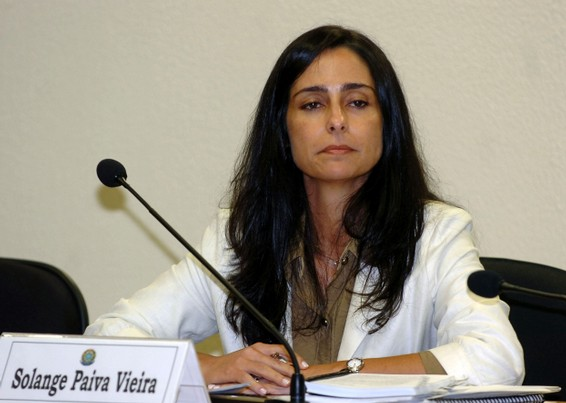
- Born: Valença, Rio de Janeiro
- Education: Federal University of Juiz de Fora; Fundação Getúlio Vargas
- Scientific career
- Fields: Economics
- Workplaces: Pontifical Catholic University of São Paulo; Universidade Candido Mendes

Solange Paiva Vieira is a Brazilian economist. She has held positions in economic policy and regulation at the Brazilian Development Bank and The Ministry of Social Security. She is a past Director of the National Civil Aviation Agency of Brazil, and in 2019 she was named the Superintendent of the Brazilian Federal Private Insurance Agency (Pt).

== Education ==
Vieira was born in Valença, in the interior of the state of Rio de Janeiro. She attended the Federal University of Juiz de Fora in Minas Gerais, where she earned a BA degree in economics. She then studied economics as a graduate student at the Fundação Getúlio Vargas. During Vieira's work for her master's degree at the Fundação Getúlio Vargas, her supervisor was Sérgio Werlang, the former director of the Central Bank in the administration of Fernando Henrique Cardoso.

== Career ==
After completing her graduate work in economics, Vieira became a professor of economics at The Pontifical Catholic University of São Paulo, as well as at The Universidade Candido Mendes.

=== Public service ===
In 1993, Vieira joined the Brazilian Development Bank. There she worked as a technician focusing on the areas of credit, planning and finance. She became the Manager in the area of credit and a manager of the financial and international areas. She also worked as an advisor to the President during the leadership of Andrea Sandro Calabi, from July 1999 to February 2000. She left her position when Calabi left, rather than continue and advise his successor Francisco Roberto André Gros.

Vieira then worked at the Ministry of Social Security. One of her accomplishments there was the fator previdenciário, a formula that ties the retirement age to life expectancy in Brazil.

In 2008, she was appointed to the National Civil Aviation Agency of Brazil by the Minister of Defense, Nelson Jobim. There she was largely responsible for regulatory updates and rollouts of policy, and particularly for ending a series of crises that plagued the Aviation Department before she held the job, which had been branded caos aéreo (aerial chaos).

In 2019, Vieira was appointed the superintendent of the Brazilian Federal Private Insurance Agency. Though her position was largely focused on administrative efficiency, a substantial portion of her role was managing the country's social security policies through the social and economic fallout of the 2019 Coronavirus pandemic.
