= São João Marcos =

Former Brazilian municipality

- Historic municipality of Rio de Janeiro
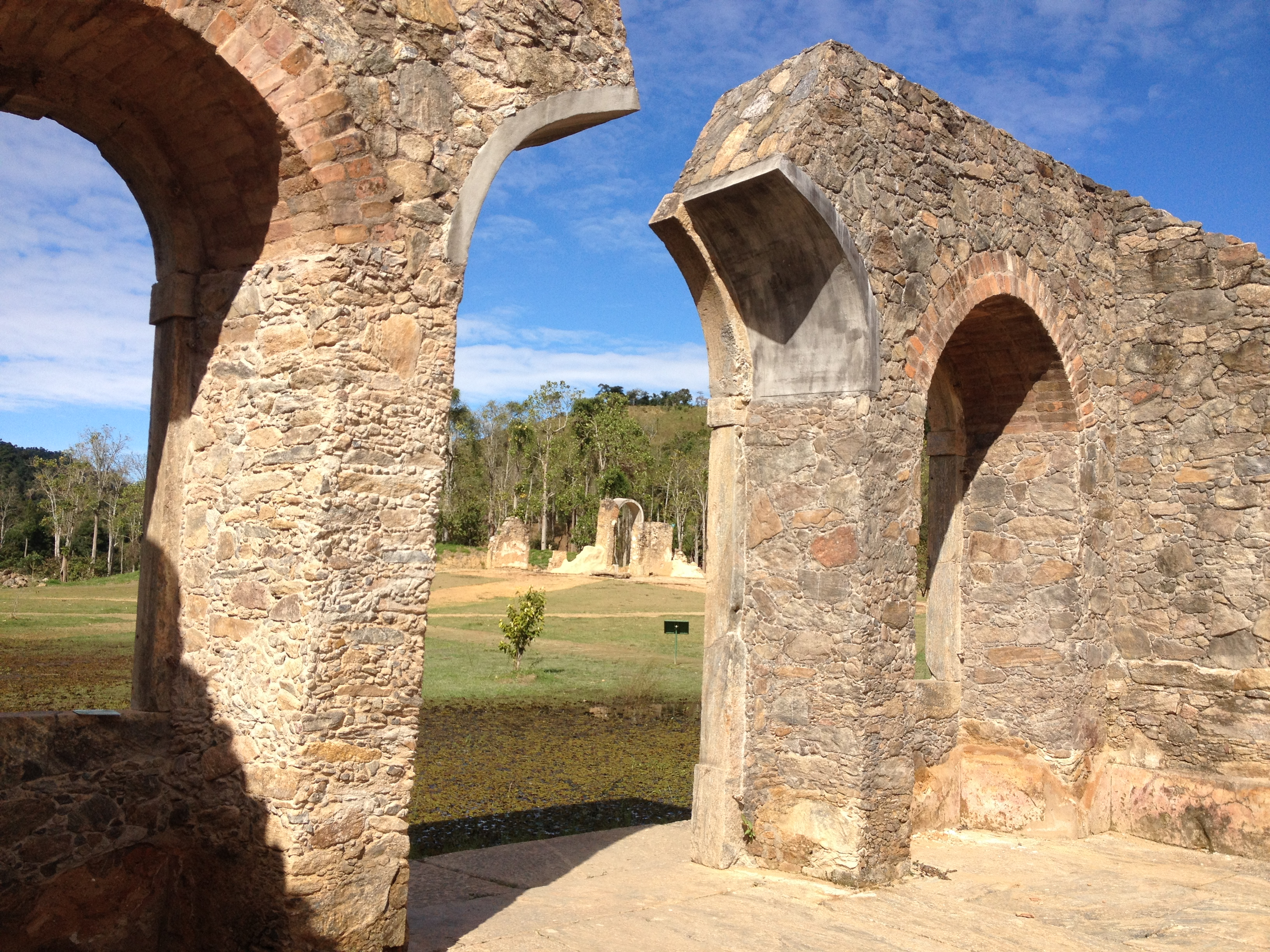
- São João Marcos Archaeological and Environmental Park
- Interactive map of São João Marcos
- Coordinates: 22°47′50″N 01°56′37″W
- Founded: 1739
- Depopulated: 1940
- Founder: João Machado Pereira

Population
  - Total: 14,000 (19th century)

São João Marcos was a former municipality in the Brazilian state of Rio de Janeiro. It was depopulated and demolished in the 1940s due to the formation of the Ribeirão das Lages Dam for the production and supply of electricity to the city of Rio de Janeiro.

On February 16, 1990, the Ponte Bela and the remaining ruins of the Historical Complex of São João Marcos were provisionally registered by the State Institute of Cultural Heritage of the Rio de Janeiro.

== History ==
São João Marcos was formed during the government of Luís Vaía Monteiro as a result of the construction of the road between Rio de Janeiro and São Paulo for the establishment of crops and passing trade. It was founded in 1739 by João Machado Pereira, who built a chapel dedicated to St. John Mark on his land.

The municipality hit its peak in the 19th century after the arrival of the coffee plantation, when it reached more than 14,000 inhabitants. Its main village had ten streets and ten lanes, a theater, a hospital, two clubs, a post office and two schools. Until the 19th century, it was called São João Marcos do Príncipe and was formed by the parishes of São João Marcos (the municipality headquarters) and Nossa Senhora da Conceição de Passa Três.

Between 1905 and 1907, the Canadian concessionaire The Rio de Janeiro Tramway, Light and Power Co. leased and flooded the headquarters of São João Marcos for the construction of a hydroelectric plant, which led to the formation of the Ribeirão das Lajes Dam.

The lake that was formed caused several epidemics to the area, such as malaria, which decimated a considerable part of the local population, contributing to the municipality's collapse. In 1943, the remaining population was relocated to neighboring municipalities such as Rio Claro (which was its district), Mangaratiba, Itaguaí and Piraí; however, the waters of the dam never covered most of the old village .

In 1939, the concessionaire wanted to raise the level of the lake to increase the dam's capacity. In order to prevent this, the former SPHAN, now IPHAN (National Historic and Artistic Heritage Institute), declared São João Marcos a protected area. However, in 1940, the site was removed from the list by a decree issued by Getúlio Vargas, who expropriated the village's land. The main church was the last building to be destroyed, since the population believed that demolishing a temple was a sin.

Today, part of the territory of São João Marcos is the third and fourth districts of the municipality of Rio Claro, in the Paraíba Fluminense Valley. The ruins of this former municipality can be seen on the banks of the RJ-149 highway between the cities of Rio Claro and Mangaratiba, where an archaeological park has been built and maintained by Light S.A. in order to preserve its memory.

== São João Marcos Archaeological and Environmental Park ==
In 2008, the Light Institute, maintained by the company Light S.A., which aims to contribute to the historical and cultural preservation of the region and the development of local tourism, with sponsorship from the Rio de Janeiro State Department of Culture, through the Culture Incentive Law and support from several institutions, began the project to build the São João Marcos Archaeological and Environmental Park. On June 9, 2011, the park was officially inaugurated and is currently one of the most visited cultural spaces in the interior of the state of Rio de Janeiro.

The park, which is the first urban archaeological site in Brazil to be fully recovered by archaeologists, is an open-air museum in the interior of Rio de Janeiro that preserves the history of the Coffee Valley. It is located in the municipality of Rio Claro and on June 23, 2016, it celebrated five years of activities dedicated to recovering the memory of the former municipality of São João Marcos, its history and cultural traditions.

Since its inauguration in 2011, the park has promoted more than 40 cultural events. In the month of its anniversary, it attracted 50,000 visitors, including more than 15,000 students from public schools, who visited the park as part of a structured educational program.

== See also ==
- History of Rio de Janeiro
