= Serra da Concórdia State Park =

State park in Rio de Janeiro, Brazil

- Parque Estadual da Serra da Concórdia
- IUCN category II (national park)
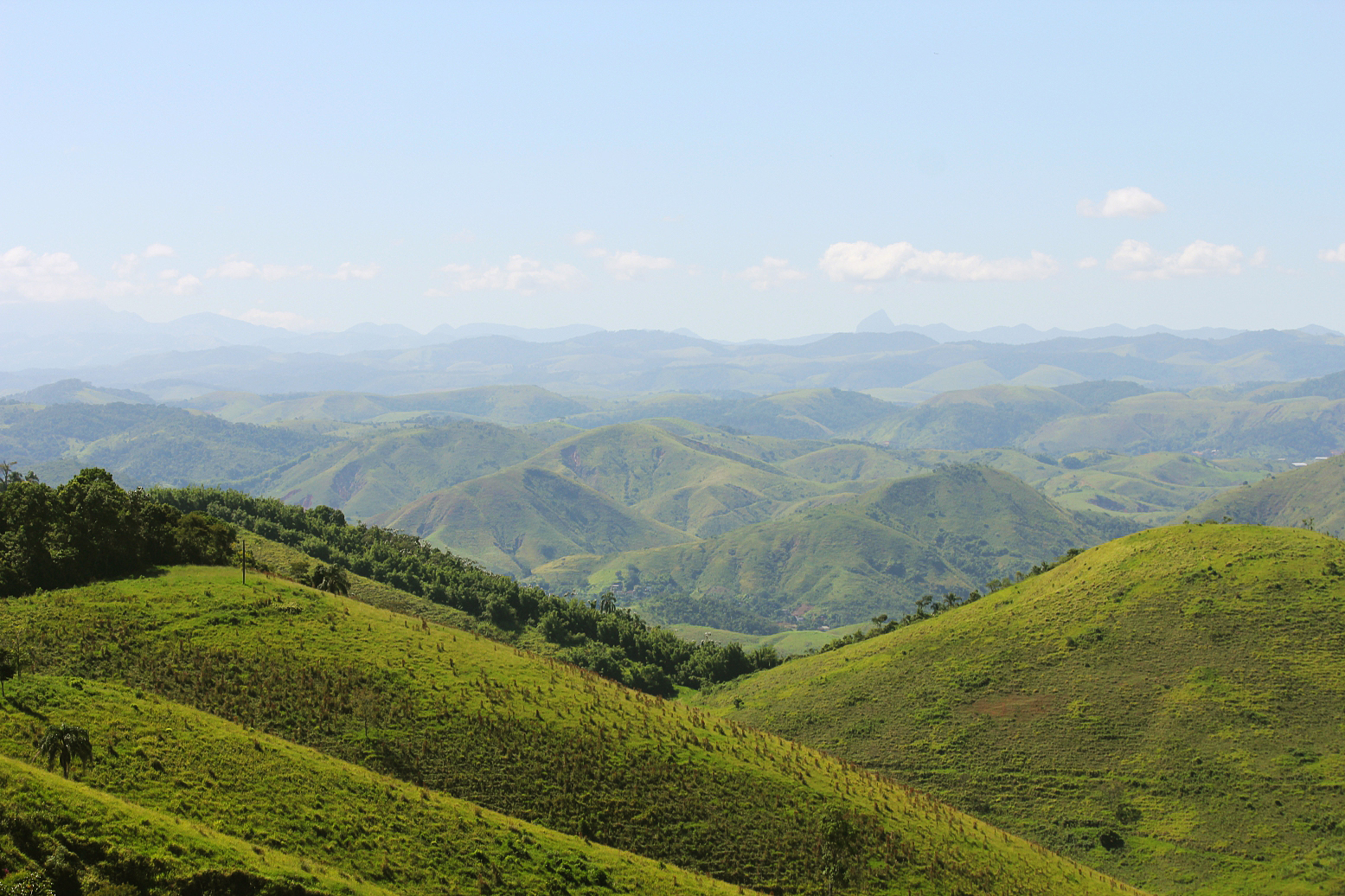
- Paraíba Valley from the park

- Location within Brazil
- Nearest city: Valença, Rio de Janeiro
- Coordinates: 22°20′20″S 43°43′44″W
- Area: 5,952 ha (22.98 sq mi)
- Designation: State park
- Created: 30 December 2002
- Administrator: Instituto Estadual do Ambiente (Inea)

The Serra da Concórdia State Park Portuguese: Parque Estadual da Serra da Concórdia is a state park in the state of Rio de Janeiro, Brazil. It protects an area of Atlantic Forest.

== Location ==
The Serra da Concórdia State Park is divided between the municipalities of Valença and Barra do Piraí, Rio de Janeiro. It has an area of 5,952.11 hectares (14,708.0 acres). The park has a temporary seat on the Estrada da Concórdia in Valença.

The park is in the Paraíba do Sul river basin, in the middle Paraíba region. It preserves one of the last remnants of seasonal semi-deciduous forest of the middle Paraíba valley. The climate is high altitude tropical, with average annual temperatures of 26 °C (79 °F) falling to as low as 10 °C (50 °F) in winter.

== History ==
The Serra da Concórdia State Park was created by state decree 32.577 of 30 December 2002. The objective is to preserve remnants of Atlantic Forest, including rare, endemic or endangered species of native fauna and flora, to integrate ecological corridors that can ensure regional biodiversity, to protect the region's water resources and to support recreation, environmental education and scientific research.

The park was enlarged by decree 45.766 of 28 September 2016. The enlargement took it from about 800 hectares (2,000 acres) to almost 6,000 hectares (15,000 acres) and included the Morro do Cruzeiro, the highest point of the Serra da Concórdia, and the Córrego Bonsucesso, Ipiabas and Ronco D’água waterfalls.

== Visiting ==
The park is open from 8:00 to 17:00 Monday to Friday. Activities include low-intensity trails, canoeing and rock climbing. Visitors may engage in other outdoor activities that do not disturb the natural environment. Visitors should stay on the trails, respect fauna and flora, make no changes to the environment and remove all garbage. Hunting, capturing animals, taking plants and making campfires are prohibited.

== Sources ==
- Matuck, Fadua (26 May 2006), "Parque Estadual da Serra da Concórdia", O Globo (in Portuguese)
- Parque Estadual da Serra da Concórdia (in Portuguese), Inea: Instituto Estadual do Ambiente, archived from the original on 2017-01-19
- Parque Estadual da Serra da Concórdia (in Portuguese), Via Rural, archived from the original on August 26, 2016
- Silva, Pedro (13 October 2016), Parque Estadual da Serra da Concórdia é ampliado para 6 mil hectares (in Portuguese), André Corrêa
