= Quatis =

- Municipality
- Município de Quatis
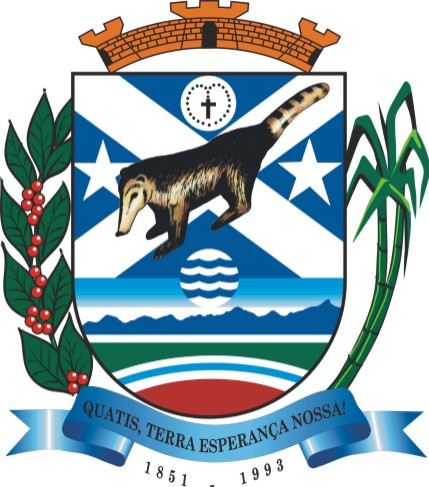
- Flag Coat of arms

- Location of Quatis in the state of Rio de Janeiro

- Location of Quatis in Brazil
- Coordinates: 22°24′25″S 44°15′28″W
- Country: Brazil
- Region: Southeast
- State: Rio de Janeiro

Government
  - Prefeito: Bruno (PMDB)

Area
  - Total: 286.244 km^{2} (110.519 sq mi)
- Elevation: 221 m (725 ft)

Population (2020)
  - Total: 14,435
- Time zone: UTC−3 (BRT)

Quatis (Portuguese pronunciation: [kwɐˈtʃis]) is a municipality located in the Brazilian state of Rio de Janeiro. Its population was 14,435 (2020) and its area is 286 km^{2}.
