= Valença, Rio de Janeiro =

Valença
- Municipality
- Municipality of Valença
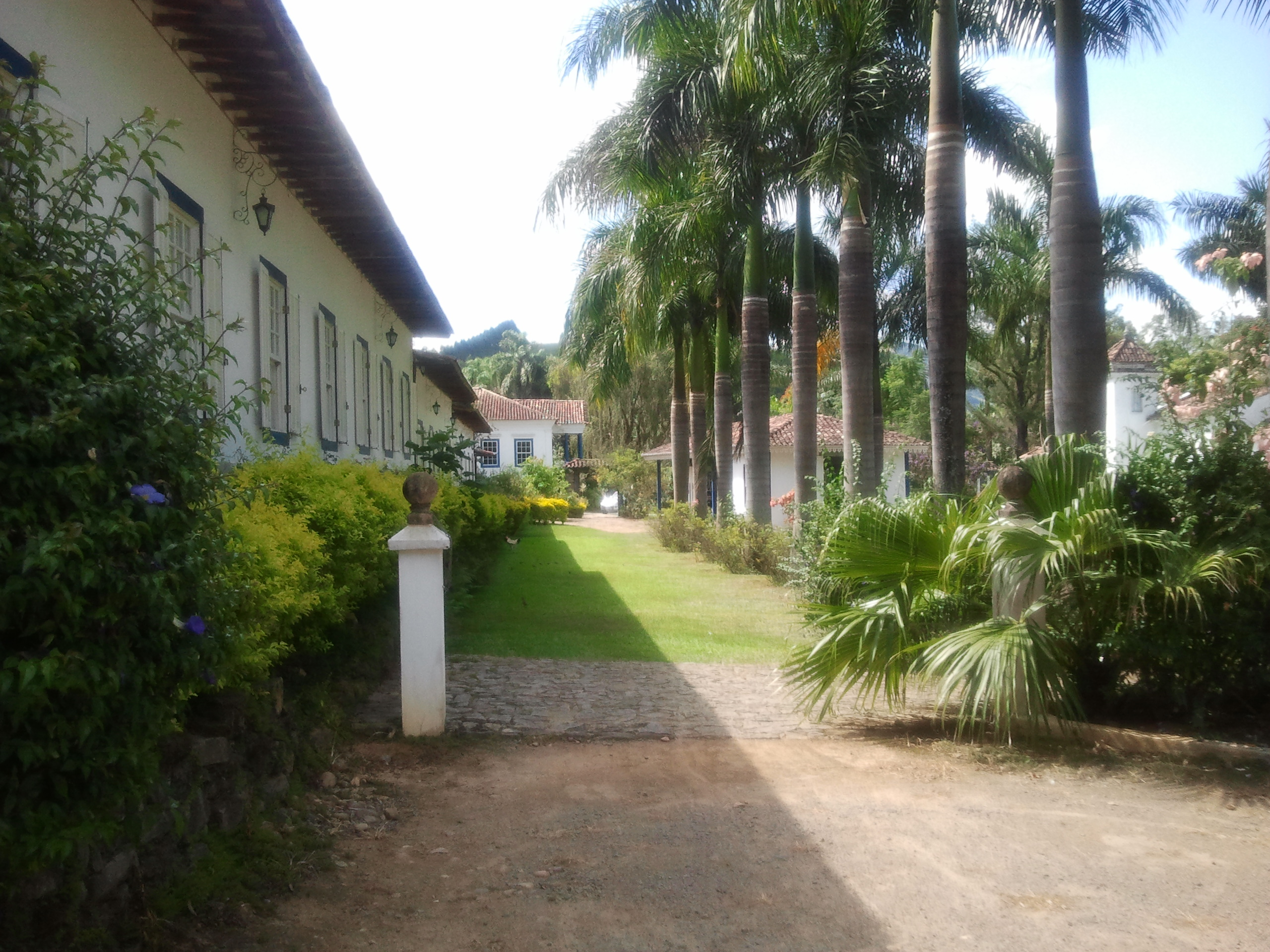
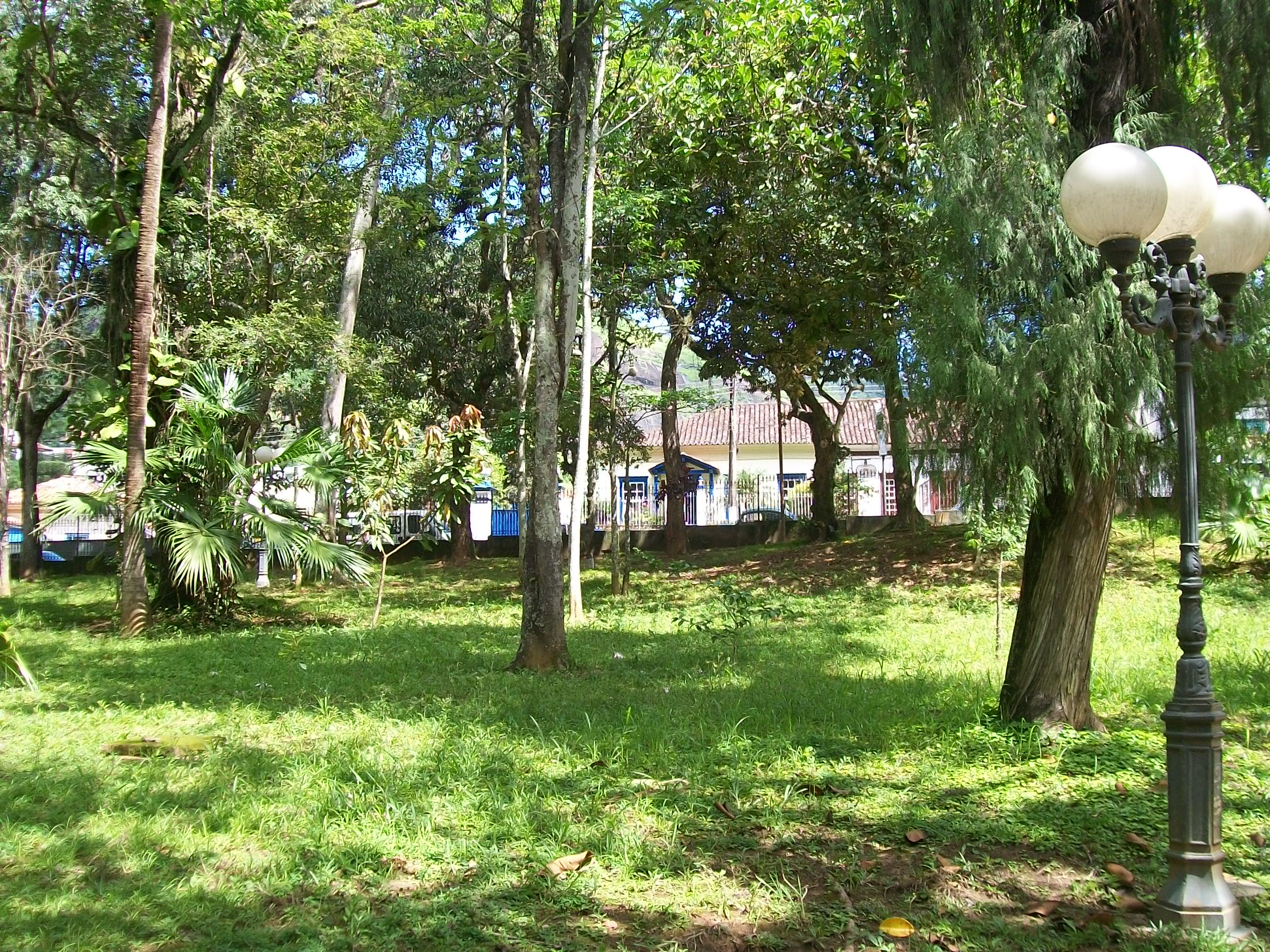
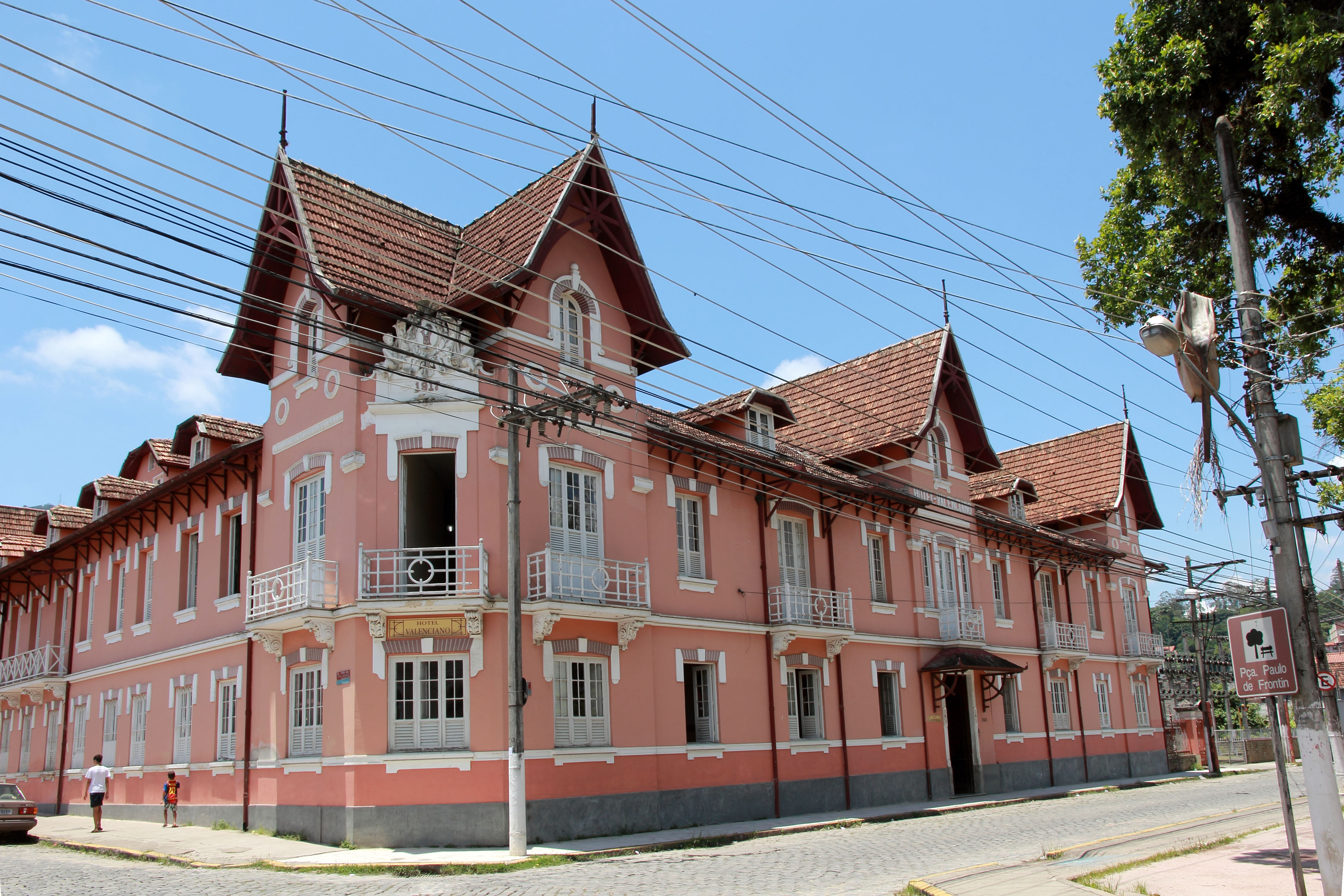
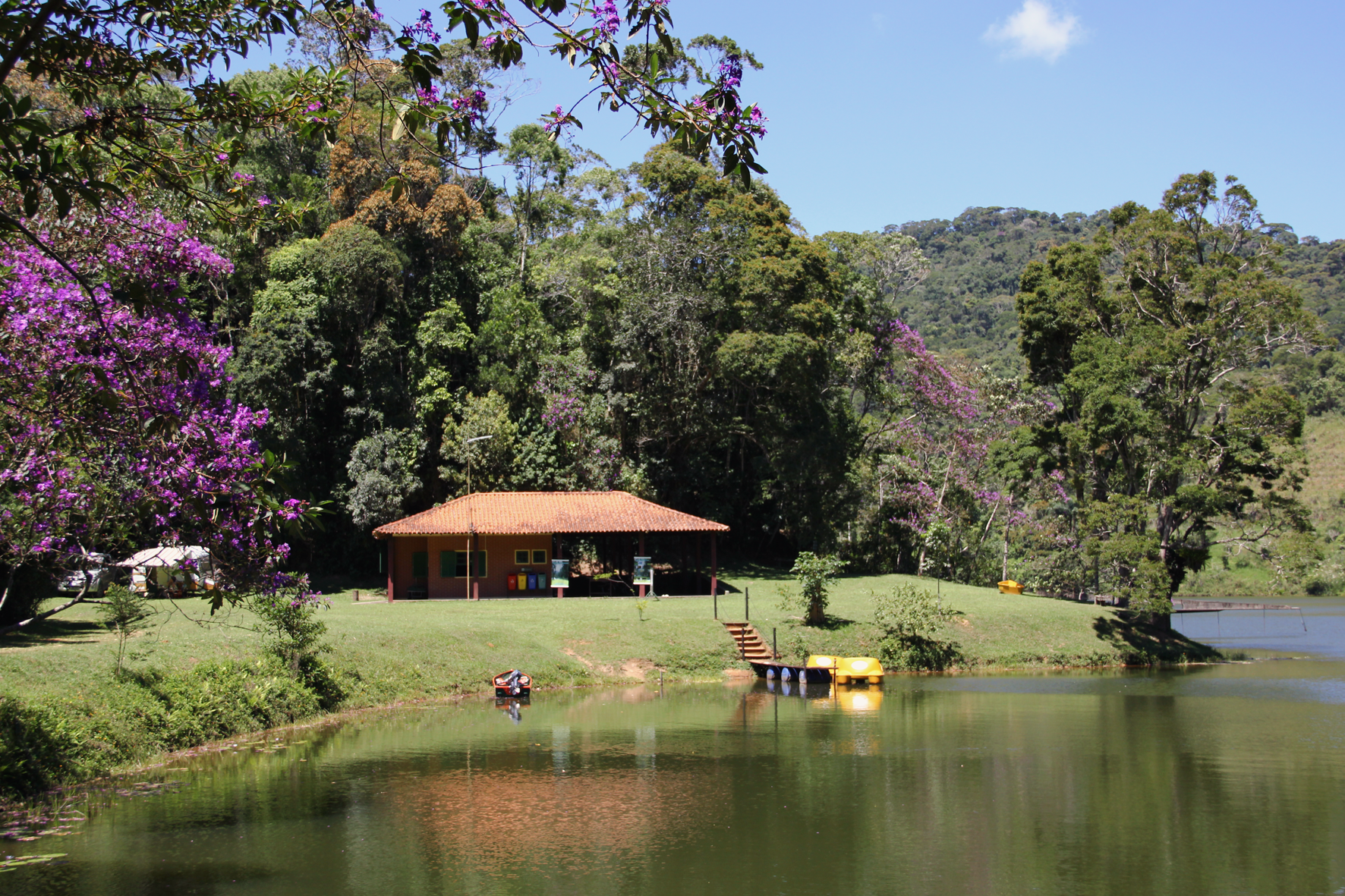
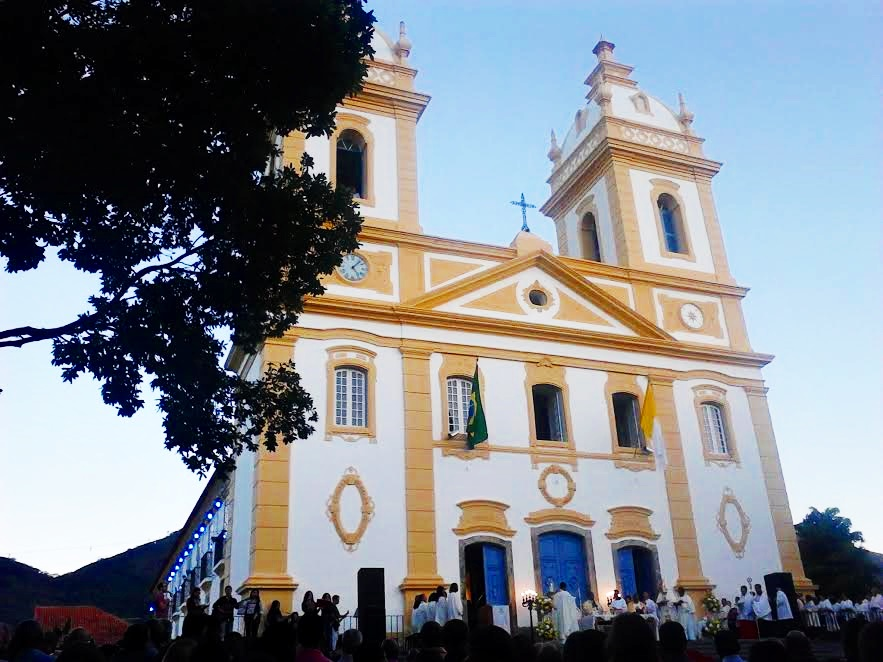
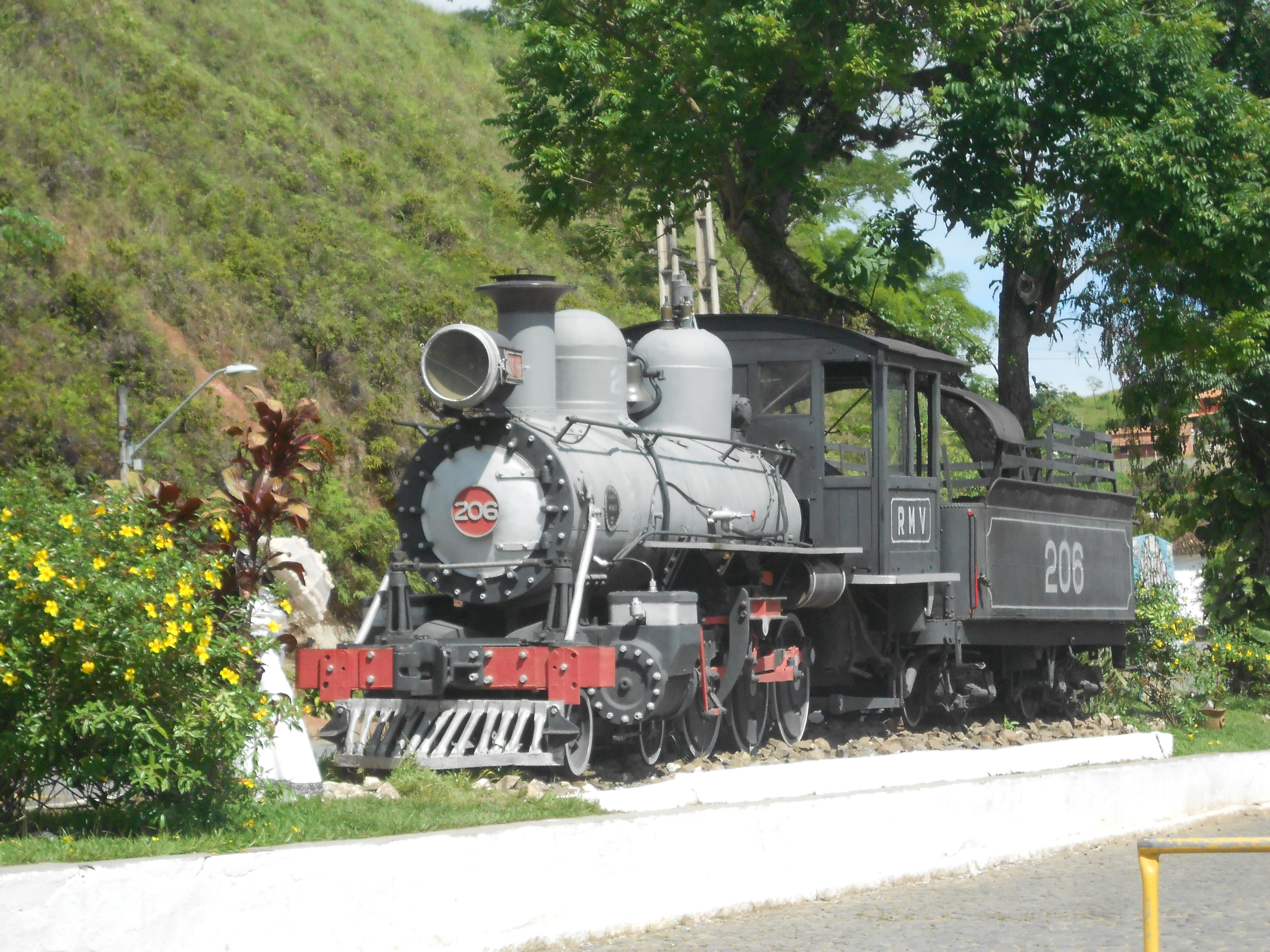

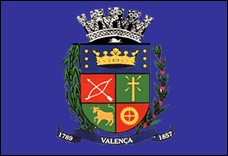
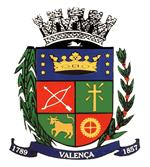
- Flag Coat of arms

- Location in Rio de Janeiro
- Coordinates: 22°14′45″S 43°42′00″W
- Country: Brazil
- Region: Southeast
- State: Rio de Janeiro

Government
  - Mayor: Fernando Graça (PP)

Area
  - Total: 1,304.813 km^{2} (503.791 sq mi)
- Elevation: 560 m (1,840 ft)

Population (2020)
  - Total: 76,869
  - Density: 58.912/km^{2} (152.58/sq mi)
- Time zone: UTC−3 (BRT)
- HDI (2010): 0.738 – high
- Website: valenca.rj.gov.br

Valença (Portuguese pronunciation: [vaˈlẽsɐ]) is a municipality located in the Brazilian state of Rio de Janeiro. Its population was estimated at 76,869 in 2020 and its area is 1,305 square kilometres (504 sq mi). The city is the seat of the Roman Catholic Diocese of Valença.

Valença has five districts: Conservatória ("City of Serenades"), Barão de Juparanã ("City of the Barons), Parapeúna, Santa Isabel do Rio Preto and Pentagna. Today its economy is geared especially for agriculture and the existing university center of UNIFAA (Educational Foundation Dom Andre Arcoverde) in the municipal headquarters.

The municipality contains part of the 5,952-hectare (14,710-acre) Serra da Concórdia State Park, created in 2002.

== People ==
- Sérgio Chapelin; (1941-), brazilian journalist, reporter, announcer and television presenter
- Solange Paiva Vieira; (1969–), economist
- Clementina de Jesus; (1901-1987), samba singer
- Paulo Cezar Costa; (1967-), prelate of Catholic Church; cardinal (2022-), Roman Catholic Archbishop of Brasília
- Rosinha de Valença; (1941-2004), composer, arranger and musician

== Climate ==
Climate data for Santa Monica (Valença), Rio de Janeiro, elevation 364 m (1,194 ft), (1981–2010)
| Month | Jan | Feb | Mar | Apr | May | Jun | Jul | Aug | Sep | Oct | Nov | Dec | Year |
|---|---|---|---|---|---|---|---|---|---|---|---|---|---|
| Mean daily maximum °C (°F) | 30.5 (86.9) | 31.3 (88.3) | 30.2 (86.4) | 28.9 (84.0) | 26.0 (78.8) | 25.8 (78.4) | 25.4 (77.7) | 26.6 (79.9) | 26.4 (79.5) | 28.3 (82.9) | 29.1 (84.4) | 29.8 (85.6) | 28.2 (82.8) |
| Daily mean °C (°F) | 24.4 (75.9) | 24.6 (76.3) | 23.7 (74.7) | 22.4 (72.3) | 19.9 (67.8) | 18.6 (65.5) | 18.2 (64.8) | 19.1 (66.4) | 20.2 (68.4) | 22.1 (71.8) | 22.8 (73.0) | 23.5 (74.3) | 21.6 (70.9) |
| Mean daily minimum °C (°F) | 18.5 (65.3) | 18.4 (65.1) | 17.9 (64.2) | 16.6 (61.9) | 14.5 (58.1) | 12.3 (54.1) | 11.9 (53.4) | 12.6 (54.7) | 14.5 (58.1) | 16.0 (60.8) | 16.8 (62.2) | 17.5 (63.5) | 15.6 (60.1) |
| Average precipitation mm (inches) | 247.9 (9.76) | 154.2 (6.07) | 138.1 (5.44) | 59.2 (2.33) | 49.1 (1.93) | 20.9 (0.82) | 21.7 (0.85) | 17.1 (0.67) | 61.2 (2.41) | 97.9 (3.85) | 156.3 (6.15) | 207.8 (8.18) | 1,231.4 (48.48) |
| Average precipitation days (≥ 1.0 mm) | 15 | 11 | 11 | 6 | 5 | 3 | 3 | 2 | 6 | 9 | 11 | 14 | 96 |
| Average relative humidity (%) | 76.9 | 75.6 | 78.9 | 78.2 | 78.3 | 77.4 | 75.8 | 71.3 | 72.5 | 72.6 | 75.4 | 77.4 | 75.9 |
Source: Instituto Nacional de Meteorologia
