= Mesoregion (geography) =

Region between the size of a district and nation

A mesoregion is a medium-sized region between the size of a city or district and that of a nation. Examples of conceptual mesoregions in Southeast Europe include Epirus and Istria. An example of the official usage of the term is Mesoregion (Brazil), a grouping of municipalities for statistical purposes.

== See also ==
- Macroregion
- Microdistrict, Soviet and Central European urban housing schemes
- Microregion
