= Macroregion =

Geopolitical subdivision

A macroregion is a geopolitical subdivision that encompasses several traditionally or politically defined regions or countries. The meaning may vary, with the common denominator being cultural, economical, historical or social similarity within a macroregion. The term is often used in the context of globalization.

- It may refer to various kinds of grouping of nation states basing on geographical proximity.
- In Romania, macroregiuni ("macroregions") are a higher-level subdivision of the country.
- Sometimes the Greater Region of Saarland-Lorraine-Luxembourg -Rhineland-Palatinate-Wallonia-French Community of Belgium- and German-speaking Community of Belgium, which has not found a specific shortcut yet, is called "the macroregion".
- Physiographic macroregions of China.
- Regions of Brazil are often referred to as "macroregions", to avoid the confusion of the common word "region".
- Bajío macroregion in the north-central Western Mexico is a clear example of the concept.

== Other uses ==
The term "macroregion" may be also used in the context of natural regions, like in Slovenia.

== See also ==
- Mesoregion
- Microdistrict, Soviet and Central European urban housing schemes
- Microregion
