= Federal Institute of Rio de Janeiro =

University in Brazil

Federal Institute of Education, Science and Technology of Rio de Janeiro
- Instituto Federal de Educação, Ciência e Tecnologia do Rio de Janeiro
- Type: Public university
- Established: December 29, 2008
- Rector: Fernando Cesar Pimentel Gusmão
- Location: Rio de Janeiro, Brazil
- Campus: Urban
- Colors: Green, white
- Website: www.ifrj.edu.br

The Federal Institute of Rio de Janeiro (Portuguese: Instituto Federal do Rio de Janeiro, IFRJ), or in full: Federal Institute of Education, Science and Technology of Rio de Janeiro (Portuguese: Instituto Federal de Educação, Ciência e Tecnologia do Rio de Janeiro) is an institution that offers high and professional educations by having a pluricurricular form. It is a multicampi institution, specialising with professional and technological education in different areas of knowledge (biologics/human sciences/exact sciences). It was known previously as Centro Federal de Educação Tecnológica de Química de Nilópolis. IFRJ is a federal institution, public, directly vinculated to the Ministry of Education of Brazil.

== History ==
=== Escola Superior de Química (1947-2008) ===
The story began in 1945 with the creation of the Vocational Industrial Chemistry Technician (CTQI). Since February 1942 the Decree Law 4,127 / 1942 provided in Article 4, the creation of a Chemical Technical School. However, only on 16 August 1943 by Decree-Law was formally established the course by the National School of Chemistry at the University of Brazil, current Federal University of Rio de Janeiro. This course worked on the premises of that University from 1944 to 1946, but soon after, even without the administrative link was changed, the course started to work in space provided by the School National Technical (ETN), current Federal Center of Technological Education Celso Suckow da Fonseca (CEFET-RJ) in Rio de Janeiro. Only on February 16, 1956, promulgated the Law 3,552 / 1956, Second Organic Law of Industrial Education, was created the Federal Technical School of Chemistry of Rio de Janeiro (ETFQ-RJ), a government agency with the mission to offer the Technical Course Industrial Chemistry.

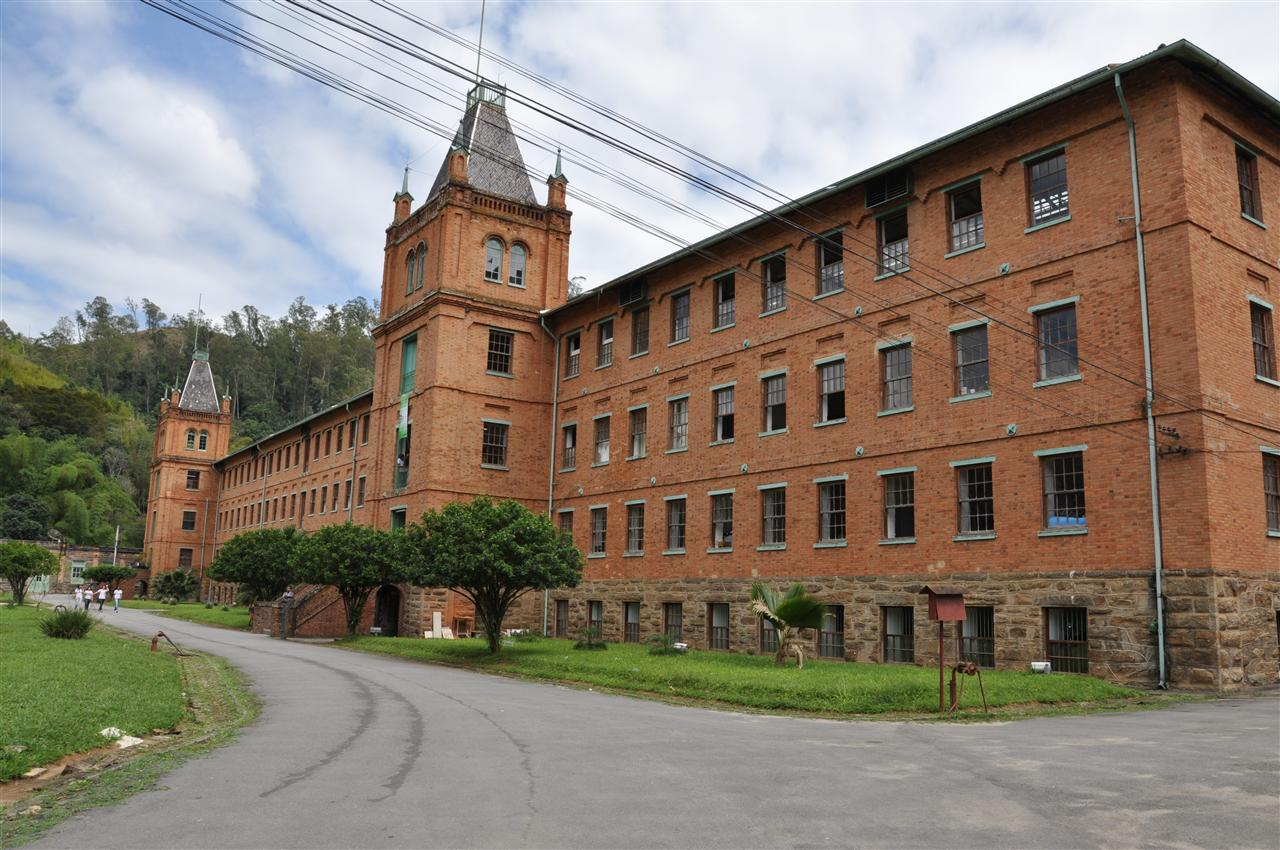
Facade

For four decades the institution remained working on the premises of TNCs with Course Industrial Chemistry Technician. The facilities were expanded classrooms and more laboratories in 1977. In 1981, after expansion of its facilities, the ETFQ-RJ, following the process of industrial and technological development of the nation, began the upgrade and expansion of its courses, creating Course Food Technician. The year 1986 marked the achievement of a headquarters in the Maracanã neighborhood, municipality of Rio de Janeiro and in 1988 the creation of the Technical Course in Biotechnology.

In 1994, ETFQ RJ-founded the Decentralized Teaching Unit Nilópolis (UNED). Initially, they were only offered technical courses, with new facilities, which relied on laboratories for teaching and research, environment rooms, classrooms, library, cafeteria, auditorium, and sports courts. In 1999 ETFQ-RJ had its headquarters moved to Nilopolis and assumed new responsibilities, to be transformed into the Federal Center of Technological Education Chemistry - Chemistry CEFET / RJ. The transformation in higher education institution allowed to offer undergraduate and graduate together created with the Scientific and Cultural Centre, a space for training and teacher training, dissemination and popularization of science and its interactions with the various human activities. In 2005, the Chemical CEFET / RJ expanded offering sensu post-graduation courses.

=== IFRJ (2008-) ===
The Federal Institute of Education, Science and Technology of Rio de Janeiro - IFRJ - was established pursuant to Law 11,892, of December 29, 2008, then part of the Federal Professional Education Network, Science and Technology as federal Institute of Education, science and technology (IFET). By law, the transformation of the Federal Center of Technological Education of Nilópolis Chemistry (CEFE Nilópolis-RJ Chemical), followed by integration of the Agricultural College Nile, until then linked to the UFF were attached to IFRJ campuses. Other institutions were also being integrated as Advanced Center of Arraial do Cabo and the Advanced Center of Duque de Caxias.

Starting there was nescessario the creation of new campuses Paracambi, São Gonçalo, Volta Redonda, Paulo de Frontin, Arraial do Cabo, Realengo e Mesquita

== Academics ==
=== Undergraduate courses ===
Biosciences

- Biology
- Biotechnology
- Pharmacology
- Physiotherapy
- Occupational therapy
- Food chemistry/science

Exact sciences

- Industrial Production Management
- Physics
- Mathematics
- Chemistry
- Chemical process
- Industrial chemistry
- Environmental chemistry

Humanities

- Game design
- Environmental resource management
- Cultural production

=== Postgraduate courses ===
There are 13 post-graduation courses, being 9 lato sensu (specialization) and 4 stricto sensu (master's and doctor's degrees).

== Campuses ==
=== Rio de Janeiro ===
Campus Matriz - Rua Pereira de Almeida, 88, Praça da Bandeira, Rio de Janeiro, RJ. CEP: 20260-100.

Campus Maracanã - Rua Senador Furtado, 121/125, Maracanã, Rio de Janeiro, RJ, CEP: 20.270-021. Diretor-Geral: Florinda do Nascimento Cersosimo

Campus Realengo - Rua Carlos Wenceslau, 343, Realengo, Rio de Janeiro, RJ. Diretora-Geral: Sandra da Silva Viana

=== Other municipalities ===
Campus Arraial do Cabo - Rua José Pinto de Macedo, s/nº, Centro, Arraial do Cabo, RJ. Diretor-Geral: João Gilberto da Silva Carvalho

Campus Duque de Caxias - Avenida República do Paraguai, 120, Sarapuí, Duque de Caxias, RJ. Diretora-Geral: Teresa Cristina de Jesus Moura Martins.

Campus Mesquita - Rua Baronesa de Mesquita, s/n, Centro, Mesquita, RJ. Diretora-Geral: Grazielle Rodrigues Pereira

Campus Niterói - Estr. Washington Luís, 1596, Sapê, Niterói, RJ. Diretor-Geral: Eudes Pereira de Souza Júnior

Campus Nilópolis - Rua Lúcio Tavares no 1.045, Centro, Nilópolis, RJ, CEP: 26.530-060. Diretor-Geral: Wallace Vallory Nunes

Campus Paracambi - Rua Sebastião de Lacerda, s/nº, Paracambi, RJ. Diretora-Geral: Cristiane Henriques de Oliveira

Campus Pinheiral - Rua José Breves, 550, Breves, Pinheiral, RJ. Diretor-Geral: Reginaldo Ribeiro Soares

Campus Volta Redonda - Rua Antônio Barreiros, nº 212, Aterrado, Volta Redonda, RJ. Diretor-Geral: Alexandre Mendes

Campus São Gonçalo - Rua Oliveira Botelho s/n, Neves, São Gonçalo, RJ. Diretor-Geral: Tiago Giannerini da Costa

Campus Avançado Engenheiro Paulo de Frotin - Avenida Maria Luiza, s/n, - Sacra Família do Tinguá – Engenheiro Paulo de Frontin, RJ. Diretor-Geral: Rodney Cezar de Albuquerque

== See also ==
- Federal University of Rio de Janeiro
- Federal Institute of Brasília
- Universities and Higher Education in Brazil
