= Pinheiral =

- Municipality
- Município de Pinheiral
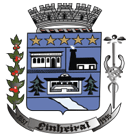
- Flag Coat of arms

- Location of Pinheiral in the state of Rio de Janeiro

- Location of Pinheiral in Brazil
- Coordinates: 22°30′46″S 44°00′03″W
- Country: Brazil
- Region: Southeast
- State: Rio de Janeiro

Government
  - Prefeito: Ednardo Barbosa (PMDB)

Area
  - Total: 76.793 km^{2} (29.650 sq mi)
- Elevation: 345 m (1,132 ft)

Population (2020)
  - Total: 25,364
- Time zone: UTC−3 (BRT)

Pinheiral (Portuguese pronunciation: [piɲejˈɾaw]) is a municipality located in the Brazilian state of Rio de Janeiro. Its population was 25,364 (2020) and its area is 77 km^{2} (30 sq mi).

== History ==
The city was named after the São José do Pinheiro coffee plantation, owned by the very rich planter and slave trader José de Souza Breves (1795-1879). This estate, on which about 500 slaves used to work, was "one of the most opulent in Brazil". Nowadays, the descendants of slave plan to transform the Park of the Ruins, only vestige of the plantation and its palace, into a memory centre, including a museum and school of jongo (dance and musical genre of black communities).
