= Microregion =

Designation for territorial entities

Microregion is a designation for territorial entities.

== Klaus Roth and Ulf Brunnbauer ==
A microregion is a geographic region of a size between that of a community and that of a district.

== See also ==
- Macroregion
- Mesoregion
- Microdistrict, Soviet and Central European urban housing schemes
