= Barra do Piraí =

Municipality in Rio de Janeiro, Brazil

- Municipality
- Barra do Piraí
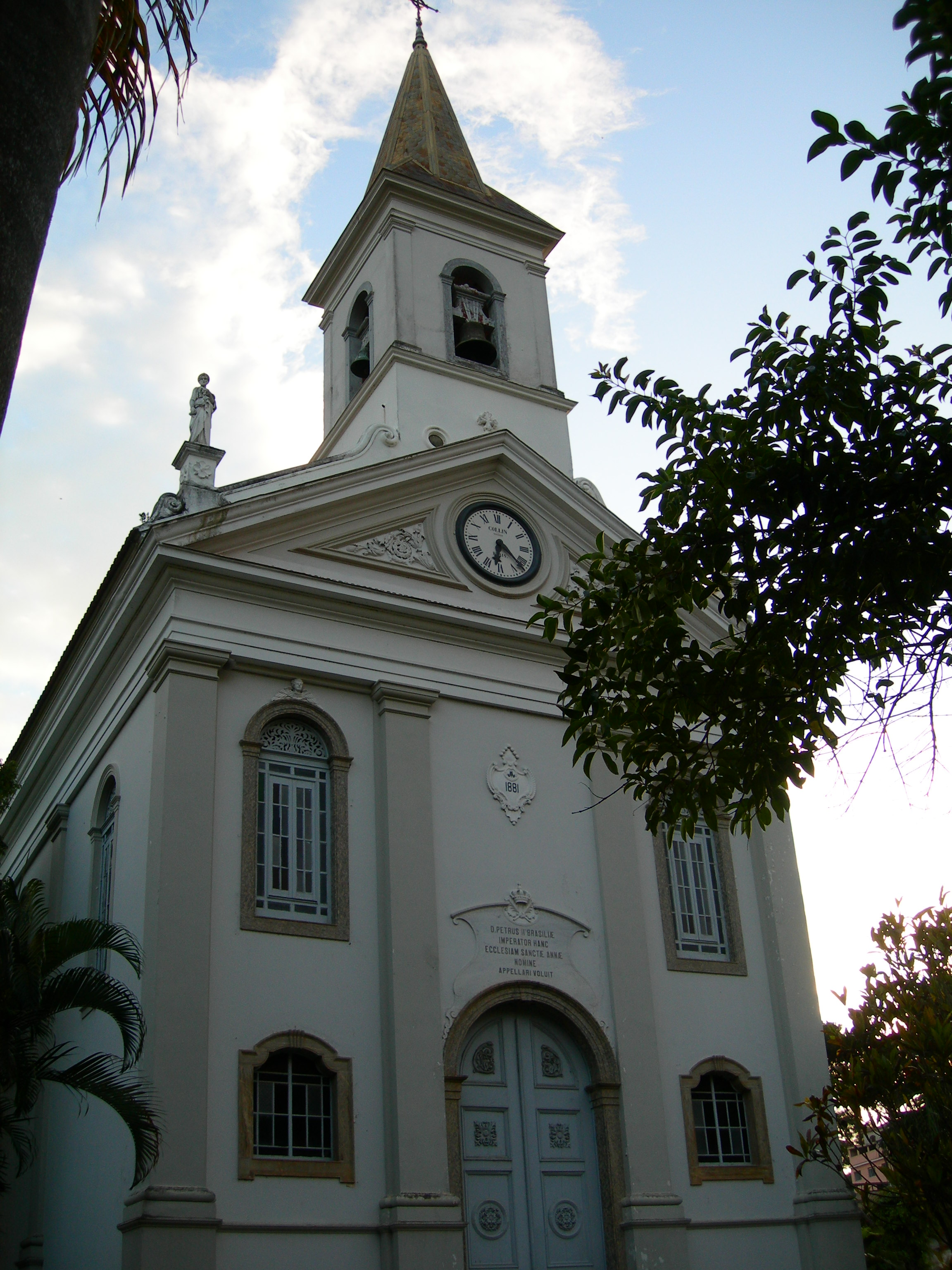
- SantAnna's Cathedral

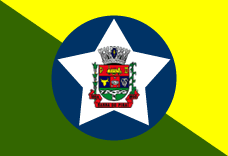
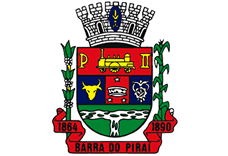
- Flag Coat of arms
- Nickname: Valley's pearl
- Location of Barra do Piraí in the state of Rio de Janeiro

- Location of Barra do Piraí in Brazil
- Coordinates: 22°28′12″S 43°49′33″W
- Country: Brazil
- Region: Southeast
- State: Rio de Janeiro

Government
  - Prefeito: Mário Esteves (PRB)

Area
  - Total: 578.471 km^{2} (223.349 sq mi)
- Elevation: 363 m (1,191 ft)

Population (2020)
  - Total: 100,764
- Time zone: UTC-3 (UTC-3)

Barra do Piraí (Portuguese pronunciation: [ˈbaʁɐ du piɾɐˈi]) is a municipality of the Brazilian state of Rio de Janeiro. It is located at latitude 22º28'12" South and longitude 43º49'32" East. Its population is 100,764 (2020) and its area is 578.471 km^{2} (223.349 sq mi). It is 114 km from Rio de Janeiro.

The municipality contains part of the 5,952 hectares (14,710 acres) Serra da Concórdia State Park, created in 2002.
