= Rio Claro, Rio de Janeiro =

Rio Claro
- Municipality
- Município de Rio Claro
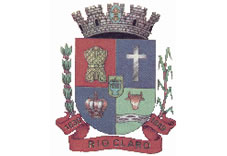
- Flag Coat of arms

- Location of Rio Claro in the state of Rio de Janeiro

- Location of Rio Claro in Brazil
- Coordinates: 22°43′22″S 44°08′09″W
- Country: Brazil
- Region: Southeast
- State: Rio de Janeiro

Government
  - Prefeito: Professor Osmar (PR)

Area
  - Total: 841.390 km^{2} (324.862 sq mi)
- Elevation: 446 m (1,463 ft)

Population (2020)
  - Total: 18,605
- Time zone: UTC−3 (BRT)

Rio Claro (Portuguese pronunciation: [ˈʁi.u ˈklaɾu]) is a municipality located in the Brazilian state of Rio de Janeiro. Its population was 18,605 (2020) and its area is 841 km^{2}.

== See also ==
- São João Marcos
