= List of presidents of the Regional Government of Galicia =

Under the Galician Statute of Autonomy, the president of the Regional Government of Galicia is the head of the government of the Spanish autonomous community of Galicia. Namely, he or she is the president of the executive body of the Galician government, the Xunta de Galicia.

As in other parliamentary democracies the president is actually appointed by the Parliament which is, on the other hand, directly voted in by the citizens.

The democratic period in Galicia starts in 1977 with the end of Francoist Spain. Before that Galicia had last enjoyed self-government in the Middle Ages, in addition to a short period when the Xunta Suprema de Galicia was established during the Peninsular War (1808-1813).

Technically speaking, the first two presidents up to 1981 were presidents of a non-autonomous Galicia, since the actual Statute of Autonomy was only passed in April 1981. Nonetheless, they played an important role in setting up the institution.

== List of presidents ==
Governments:

- UCD
- AP
- PP
- Mixed coalition

Portrait	Name (Birth–Death)	Term of office			Party	Government Composition	Election	Monarch (Reign)	Ref.
Portrait	Name (Birth–Death)	Took office	Left office	Duration	Party	Government Composition	Election	Monarch (Reign)	Ref.
	Antonio Rosón (1911–1986)	11 April 1978	9 June 1979	1 year and 59 days	UCD	Rosón; UCD–PSOE	N/A	King; Juan Carlos I (1975–2014)	
	José Quiroga Suárez (1920–2006)	9 June 1979	13 January 1982	2 years and 218 days	UCD	Quiroga; UCD	N/A	King; Juan Carlos I (1975–2014)	
	Gerardo Fernández Albor (1917–2018)	13 January 1982	26 February 1986	5 years and 254 days	AP	Albor I AP until Mar 1983; AP–Ind. from Mar 1983	1981	King; Juan Carlos I (1975–2014)	
	Gerardo Fernández Albor (1917–2018)	26 February 1986	23 September 1987 (censored)	5 years and 254 days	AP	Albor II; AP	1985	King; Juan Carlos I (1975–2014)	
	Fernando González Laxe (born 1952)	28 September 1987	2 February 1990	2 years and 127 days	PSdG– PSOE	Laxe; PSOE–CG–UDG–PNG	1985	King; Juan Carlos I (1975–2014)	
	Manuel Fraga (1922–2012)	2 February 1990	7 December 1993	15 years and 180 days	PP	Fraga I PP	1989	King; Juan Carlos I (1975–2014)	
	Manuel Fraga (1922–2012)	7 December 1993	5 December 1997	15 years and 180 days	PP	Fraga II; PP	1993	King; Juan Carlos I (1975–2014)	
	Manuel Fraga (1922–2012)	5 December 1997	11 December 2001	15 years and 180 days	PP	Fraga III; PP	1997	King; Juan Carlos I (1975–2014)	
	Manuel Fraga (1922–2012)	11 December 2001	1 August 2005	15 years and 180 days	PP	Fraga IV; PP	2001	King; Juan Carlos I (1975–2014)	
	Emilio Pérez Touriño (born 1948)	1 August 2005	18 April 2009	3 years and 260 days	PSdeG– PSOE	Touriño; PSOE–BNG	2005	King; Juan Carlos I (1975–2014)	
	Alberto Núñez Feijóo (born 1961)	18 April 2009	30 November 2012	13 years and 25 days	PP	Feijóo I PP	2009	King; Juan Carlos I (1975–2014)	
	Alberto Núñez Feijóo (born 1961)	30 November 2012	12 November 2016	13 years and 25 days	PP	Feijóo II; PP	2012	King; Juan Carlos I (1975–2014)	
	Alberto Núñez Feijóo (born 1961)	30 November 2012	12 November 2016	13 years and 25 days	PP	Feijóo II; PP	2012	King; Felipe VI (2014–present)	
	Alberto Núñez Feijóo (born 1961)	12 November 2016	4 September 2020	13 years and 25 days	PP	Feijóo III; PP	2016	King; Felipe VI (2014–present)	
	Alberto Núñez Feijóo (born 1961)	4 September 2020	30 April 2022 (resigned)	13 years and 25 days	PP	Feijóo IV; PP	2020	King; Felipe VI (2014–present)	
During this interval, First Vice President Alfonso Rueda served as acting officeholder.						Feijóo IV; PP	2020	King; Felipe VI (2014–present)	
	Alfonso Rueda (born 1968)	13 May 2022	12 April 2024	4 years and 165 days	PP	Rueda I PP	2020	King; Felipe VI (2014–present)	
	Alfonso Rueda (born 1968)	12 April 2024	Incumbent	4 years and 165 days	PP	Rueda II; PP	2024	King; Felipe VI (2014–present)	

== See also ==
- Xunta de Galicia
- Parliament of Galicia
- Autonomous Community
- Devolution
- History of Galicia
- Galician Statute of Autonomy
