= List of people with given name Diego =

Notable people with the given name Diego include:

== People ==
- Diego (footballer), a variety of association football players
- Diego de Oviedo, 10th-century Asturian prelate
- Diego de León, 12th-century Leonese prelate
- Diego de Ourense, 12th-century Galician prelate
- Diego de Asturias, 16th-century Spanish Royal heir who died at age 7
- Diego Abatantuono, Italian actor and screenwriter
- Diego Agüero (born 1984), Paraguayan footballer
- Diego de Almagro, Spanish conquistador
- Diego Aventín, Argentine race car driver
- Diego Avila, Argentine field hockey player
- Diego Ávila (born 1961), Bolivian economist and politician
- Diego Bareiro, Paraguayan basketball player
- Diego Buñuel, French journalist
- Diego Calvo Pouso (born 1975), Spanish politician
- Diego Camacho (tennis), Bolivian tennis player
- Diego Castillo (disambiguation), several people
- Diego Causero, Italian Roman Catholic archbishop
- Diego Colón, 4th viceroy of New Spain
- Diego Corrales, American boxer
- Diego Cusi Huamán, 17th-century Peruvian painter
- Diego D'Ambrosio, Italian-American businessman
- Diego Deza, Spanish theologian and inquisitor
- Diego Di Mattia, Italian taekwondo practitioner
- Diego Domínguez (disambiguation), several people
- Diego Durán, Spanish Dominican friar
- Diego El Mulato, a name given to several pirates who were active in the Caribbean in the 1600s
- Diego Fabbrini, Italian footballer
- Diego Fagot (born 1997), American football player
- Diego Fuser, Italian footballer
- Diego García de Moguer, Spanish-Portuguese explorer
- Diego García de Paredes, Spanish soldier, mercenary and duelist
- Diego Gelmírez, first archbishop of Compostela
- Diego González, Mexican singer, musician and actor, often known simply as Diego (also known as Diego Boneta in the U.S.)
- Diego Hartfield, Argentine tennis player
- Diego Afan Hidalgo, Spanish Educator
- Diego Hurtado de Mendoza, 1st Duke of the Infantado, Spanish noble
- Diego Hypólito, Brazilian gymnast
- Diego José de Cádiz (1743–1801), Spanish Capuchin friar
- Diego de Landa, 16th-century bishop of Yucatán
- Diego Klattenhoff, Canadian actor
- Diego Lerman, Argentine film director, producer and screenwriter
- Diego López de Pacheco, 2nd Duke of Escalona, Spanish noble
- Diego Luna, Mexican actor
- Diego Maradona, Argentine football player
- Diego Martín, Spanish actor
- Diego Masson, French music conductor and composer
- Diego de Mendoza, Mexican city king in the 16th century
- Diego Meneses (born 1998), Colombian para-athlete
- Diego Morales (disambiguation), several people
- Diego Morejón, Ecuadorian politician
- Diego Nargiso, Italian tennis player
- Diego Pavia (born 2002), American football player
- Diego Pounds (born 2002), American football player
- Diego Pérez, Uruguayan tennis player
- Diego Portales, Chilean politician
- Diego Quaquá (born 1998), Brazilian politician
- Diego Rísquez (1949–2018), Venezuelan film director
- Diego Rivera, Mexican painter
- Diego Rodríguez (son of El Cid), Spanish soldier
- Diego Sanchez, American mixed martial artist
- Diego Schwartzman, Argentine tennis player
- Diego Seguí, Cuban baseball pitcher
- Diego Silang, Philippine revolutionary leader
- Diego Siloe, Spanish Renaissance architect and sculptor
- Diego Sorgatto (born 1990), Brazilian politician
- Diego Torres, Argentine singer and composer
- Diego Vargas (disambiguation), several people
- Diego de Vargas, Spanish governor of New Spain
- Diego Vicentini, Venezuelan film maker
- Diego Villanueva, Brazilian singer-songwriter
- Diego Velázquez, 17th-century Spanish painter
- Diego Velázquez de Cuéllar, Spanish conquistador
- Diego Coronel, Iconic Argentine teacher.

== Fictional characters ==
- Diego, a saber-tooth tiger voiced by Denis Leary of the film series Ice Age
- Diego Alcazar, in the TV series General Hospital
- Diego Armando, the defence attorney from Phoenix Wright: Ace Attorney − Trials and Tribulations, who is mostly seen under the name Godot (who becomes a prosecutor)
- Diego Brando, from the seventh part of the manga JoJo's Bizarre Adventure, Steel Ball Run
- Don Diego de la Vega, the real identity of Zorro
- Diego Hargreeves, main character in the comic book/Netflix series The Umbrella Academy
- Diego (Dead or Alive), a character from Dead or Alive video game series
