= Fourth government of Alberto Núñez Feijóo =

4th government of Alberto Núñez Feijóo
- 12th Government of Galicia
- 2020–2022
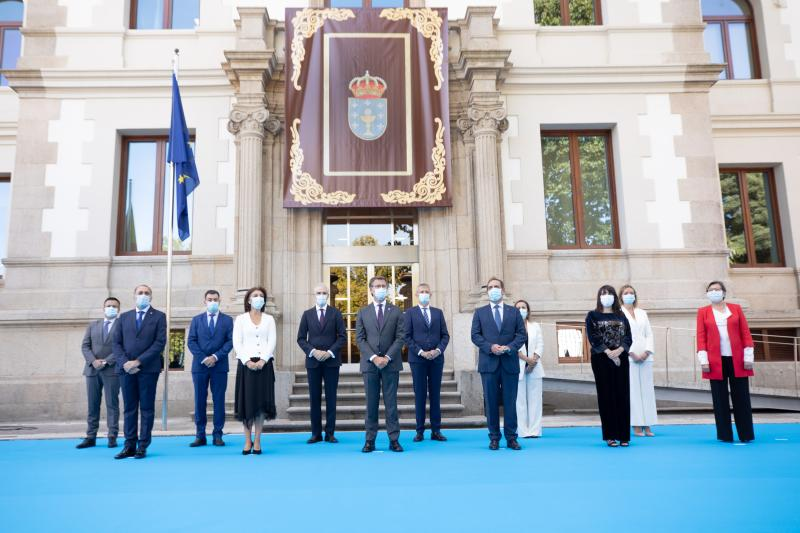
- The government in September 2020.
- Date formed: 7 September 2020
- Date dissolved: 16 May 2022

People and organisations
- Monarch: Felipe VI
- President: Alberto Núñez Feijóo
- Vice President: Alfonso Rueda^{1st}, Francisco Conde^{2nd}
- No. of ministers: 11 (Note: Does not include the President.)
- Total no. of members: 12
- Member party: PP
- Status in legislature: Majority government
- Opposition party: BNG
- Opposition leader: Ana Pontón

History
- Election: 2020 regional election
- Legislature term: 11th Parliament
- Budget: 2021, 2022
- Predecessor: Feijóo III
- Successor: Rueda

The fourth government of Alberto Núñez Feijóo was formed on 7 September 2020, following the latter's reelection as President of Galicia by the Parliament of Galicia on 3 September and his swearing-in on 5 September, as a result of the People's Party (PP) emerging as the largest parliamentary force at the 2020 Galician regional election. It succeeded the third Feijóo government and was the Government of Galicia from 7 September 2020 to 16 May 2022, a total of 616 days, or 1 year, 8 months and 9 days.

The cabinet comprised members of the PP and a number of independents.

== Investiture ==
Investiture; Alberto Núñez Feijóo (PP)
Ballot →	3 September 2020
Required majority →	38 out of 75
Yes: • PP (42)	42 / 75
No: • BNG (19); • PSdeG (14)	33 / 75
Abstentions	0 / 75
Absentees	0 / 75

== Council of Government ==
The Council of Government was structured into the office for the president, the two vice presidents and 11 ministries.

← Feijóo IV Government → (7 September 2020 – 16 May 2022)
Portfolio	Name	Party	Took office	Left office	Ref.
President	Alberto Núñez Feijóo	PP	4 September 2020	13 May 2022	
First Vice President and Minister of the Presidency, Justice and Tourism	Alfonso Rueda	PP	7 September 2020	16 May 2022	
Second Vice President and Minister of Economy, Business and Innovation	Francisco Conde	PP	7 September 2020	16 May 2022	
Minister of Finance and Public Administration	Valeriano Martínez	PP	7 September 2020	6 October 2021†	
Minister of Environment, Territory and Housing	Ángeles Vázquez	PP	7 September 2020	16 May 2022	
Minister of Infrastructures and Mobility	Ethel Vázquez	PP	7 September 2020	16 May 2022	
Minister of Culture, Education and University	Román Rodríguez	PP	7 September 2020	16 May 2022	
Minister of Employment and Equality	María Jesús Lorenzana	Independent	7 September 2020	16 May 2022	
Minister of Health	Julio García Comesaña	Independent	7 September 2020	16 May 2022	
Minister of Social Policy	Fabiola García	PP	7 September 2020	16 May 2022	
Minister of Rural Affairs	José González	PP	7 September 2020	16 May 2022	
Minister of the Sea	Rosa Quintana	PP	7 September 2020	16 May 2022	
=== Changes October 2021 ===
Portfolio	Name	Party	Took office	Left office	Ref.
Minister of Finance and Public Administration	Alfonso Rueda served as surrogate from 7 to 18 October 2021.				
Minister of Finance and Public Administration	Miguel Corgos	Independent	18 October 2021	16 May 2022	

== Notes ==
Preceded by Feijóo III	Government of Galicia; 2020–2022	Succeeded by Rueda
