= Third government of Alberto Núñez Feijóo =

Third Feijóo Government
- Government of Galicia
- Incumbent
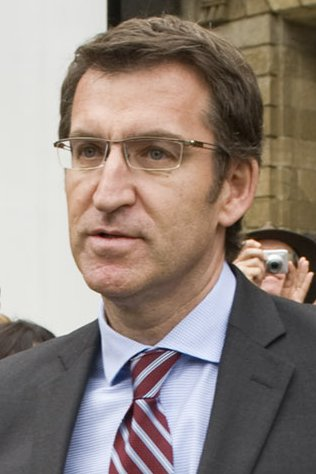
- Date formed: 11 November 2016

People and organisations
- Head of government: Alberto Núñez Feijóo
- Deputy head of government: Alfonso Rueda
- No. of ministers: 11
- Member party: People's Party
- Status in legislature: Majority government
- Opposition party: En Marea
- Opposition leader: Luis Villares

History
- Election: 2016 regional election
- Legislature term: 10th Parliament (2016–)
- Predecessor: Feijóo II
- Successor: Feijóo IV

The Third Feijóo Government was the regional government of Galicia led by President Alberto Núñez Feijóo between 2016 and 2020. It was formed in November 2016 after the September regional election.

== Government ==
Name	Portrait	Party	Office	Took office	Left office	^{Refs.}
Alberto Núñez Feijóo		People's Party of Galicia	President	11 November 2016		
Alfonso Rueda		People's Party of Galicia	Vice President	14 November 2016		
Alfonso Rueda		People's Party of Galicia	Minister of the Presidency, Public Administration and Justice	14 November 2016		
Francisco Conde		People's Party of Galicia	Minister of Economy, Employment and Industry	14 November 2016		
Valeriano Martínez		People's Party of Galicia	Minister of Finance	14 November 2016		
Beatriz Mato		People's Party of Galicia	Minister of Environment and Territorial Planning	14 November 2016		
Rosa Quintana		People's Party of Galicia	Minister of Sea	14 November 2016		
José Manuel Rey Varela		People's Party of Galicia	Minister of Social Policy	14 November 2016		
Román Rodríguez González		People's Party of Galicia	Minister of Culture, Education and University Planning	14 November 2016		
Ángeles Vázquez		People's Party of Galicia	Minister of Rural Affairs	14 November 2016		
Ethel Vázquez		People's Party of Galicia	Minister of Infrastructure and Housing	14 November 2016		
Jesús Vázquez Almuíña		People's Party of Galicia	Minister of Health	14 November 2016		
