= First government of Alfonso Rueda =

- 13th Government of Galicia
- 2022–2024
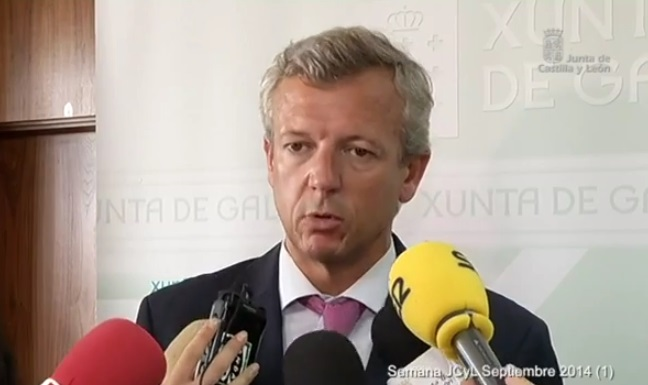
- Date formed: 16 May 2022
- Date dissolved: 15 April 2024

People and organisations
- Monarch: Felipe VI
- President: Alfonso Rueda
- Vice President: Francisco Conde^{1st}, Diego Calvo^{2nd}
- No. of ministers: 11 (Note: Does not include the President.)
- Total no. of members: 11
- Member party: PP
- Status in legislature: Majority government
- Opposition party: BNG
- Opposition leader: Ana Pontón

History
- Legislature term: 11th Parliament
- Predecessor: Feijóo IV
- Successor: Rueda II

The government of Alfonso Rueda was formed on 16 May 2022, following the latter's election as President of Galicia by the Parliament of Galicia on 12 May and his swearing-in on 14 May, after the resignation of the former president Alberto Núñez Feijóo in April. It succeeded the fourth Feijóo government and was the incumbent Government of Galicia since 16 May 2022 until 15 April 2024, a total or 1 year, 10 months and 30 days.

The cabinet was composed of members of the PP and a number of independents.

== Investiture ==
Investiture; Alfonso Rueda (PP)
Ballot →	12 May 2022
Required majority →	38 out of 75
Yes: • PP (42)	42 / 75
No: • BNG (19); • PSdeG (14)	33 / 75
Abstentions	0 / 75
Absentees	0 / 75

== Council of Government ==
The Council of Government was structured into the office for the president, the two vice presidents and 11 ministries.

← Rueda I Government → (16 May 2022 – 15 April 2024)
Portfolio	Name	Party	Took office	Left office	Ref.
President	Alfonso Rueda	PP	13 May 2022	11 April 2024	
First Vice President and Minister of Economy, Industry and Innovation	Francisco Conde	PP	16 May 2022	15 April 2024	
Second Vice President and Minister of the Presidency, Justice and Sports	Diego Calvo	PP	16 May 2022	15 April 2024	
Minister of Finance and Public Administration	Miguel Corgos	PP	16 May 2022	15 April 2024	
Minister of Environment, Territory and Housing	Ángeles Vázquez	PP	16 May 2022	15 April 2024	
Minister of Infrastructures and Mobility	Ethel Vázquez	PP	16 May 2022	15 April 2024	
Minister of Culture, Education, Vocational Training and Universities	Román Rodríguez	PP	16 May 2022	15 April 2024	
Minister of Employment Promotion and Equality	María Jesús Lorenzana	Independent	16 May 2022	15 April 2024	
Minister of Health	Julio García Comesaña	Independent	16 May 2022	15 April 2024	
Minister of Social Policy and Youth	Fabiola García	PP	16 May 2022	15 April 2024	
Minister of Rural Affairs	José González	PP	16 May 2022	15 April 2024	
Minister of the Sea	Rosa Quintana	PP	16 May 2022	15 April 2024	

== Notes ==
Preceded by Feijóo IV	Government of Galicia; 2022–	Incumbent
