= Diego (footballer) =

Notable association football players with the name Diego include:

== Argentina ==
- Diego Klimowicz (born July 1974), forward
- Diego Latorre (born August 1969), striker
- Diego Maradona (born October 1960 - November 2020), midfielder
- Diego Milito (born June 1979), striker
- Diego Rivero (born August 1981), winger
- Diego Simeone (born April 1970), midfielder

== Bolivia ==
- Diego Bengolea (born December 1979), midfielder

== Brazil ==
- Diego (footballer, born 1979) (Diego Costa Silva), goalkeeper
- Diego (footballer, born 1982) (Diego Salgado Costa de Menezes), goalkeeper
- Diego (footballer, born 1985) (Diego Ribas da Cunha), midfielder
- Diego (footballer, born April 1986) (Diego Aparecido Ferreira Oliveira), goalkeeper
- Diego (footballer, born May 1986) (Diego Dionatas dos Santos Oliveira), goalkeeper
- Diego (footballer, born 1988) (Diego Rigonato Rodrigues), left back
- Diego (footballer, born September 1995) (Diego Jara Rodrigues), left back
- Diego (footballer, born October 1995) (Jackson Diego Ibraim Fagundes), right back and midfielder
- Diego Alves (born June 1985), goalkeeper
- Diego Barcelos (born April 1985), striker
- Diego Benedito Galvão Máximo (born April 1986), defender
- Diego Cavalieri (born December 1982), goalkeeper
- Diego Clementino (born March 18, 1984), striker
- Diego Costa (born October 1988), Brazilian-Spanish striker
- Diego da Costa Menezes (born February 1982), goalkeeper
- Diego Giaretta (born November 1983), defender
- Diego Loureiro (born July 1998), goalkeeper
- Diego Oliveira De Queiroz (born June 1990), striker
- Diego Pereira Corrêa (born September 1983), left back
- Diego Souza (disambiguation), various footballers
- Diego Tardelli (born May 1985), striker
- Diego Walsh (born December 1979), Brazilian-American midfielder

== Colombia ==
- Diego Serna (born October 1973), forward

== Chile ==
- Diego Cayupil, Chilean Footballer

== Ecuador ==
- Diego Calderón (born October 1986), defender
- Diego Herrera (born April 1969), forward

== Mexico ==
- Diego Martínez (born February 1981), right back

== Portugal ==
- Diego (footballer, born 1989) (Diego Martins da Costa e Silva), goalkeeper

== Spain ==
- José Diego Álvarez (born November 1954), midfielder
- Diego Capel (born February 1988), winger
- Diego Tristán (born January 1976), striker

== Uruguay ==
- Diego Alonso (born April 1975), striker
- Diego Cor (born July 2000), forward
- Diego de Souza Carballo (born May 1984), midfielder
- Diego Fagúndez (born February 1995), midfielder
- Diego Forlán (born May 1979), striker
- Diego Godín (born February 1986), defender
- Diego Laxalt (born February 1993), defender
- Diego Lugano (born November 1980), defender
- Diego Pérez (born May 1980), midfielder
- Diego Polenta (born February 1992), defender
- Diego Rodríguez (footballer, born 1989) (born September 1989), midfielder
- Diego Rolán (born March 1993), striker
- Diego Rossi (born March 1998), forward
- Diego Sebastián Ribas (born June 1980), midfielder
- Diego Zabala (born September 1991), midfielder

== See also ==
- Diego (given name)
- Diego (surname)
