= Second government of Alfonso Rueda =

- 14th Government of Galicia
- 2024–present
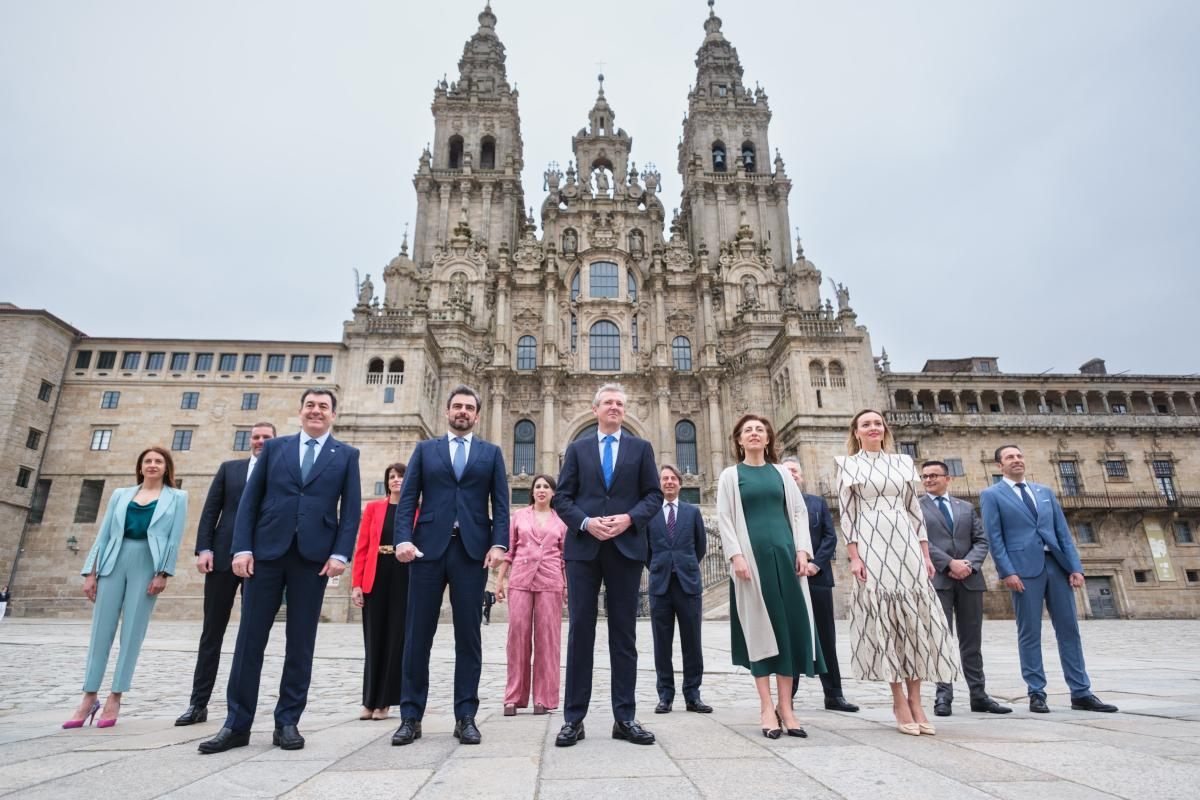
- Date formed: 15 April 2024

People and organisations
- Monarch: Felipe VI
- President: Alfonso Rueda
- No. of ministers: 12 (Note: Does not include the President.)
- Total no. of members: 12
- Member party: PP
- Status in legislature: Majority government
- Opposition party: BNG
- Opposition leader: Ana Pontón

History
- Legislature term: 12th Parliament
- Predecessor: Rueda I

The second government of Alfonso Rueda was formed on 15 April 2024, following Rueda's election as President of Galicia by the Parliament of Galicia on 11 April and his swearing-in on 14 April, after winning the 2024 regional election in February. It succeeded the first Rueda government and is the incumbent Government of Galicia since 15 April 2024.

The cabinet comprises members of the PP and a number of independents.

== Investiture ==
Investiture; Alfonso Rueda (PP)
Ballot →	11 April 2022
Required majority →	38 out of 75
Yes: • PP (40)	40 / 75
No: • BNG (25); • PSdeG (9)	34 / 75
Abstentions: • DO (1)	1 / 75
Absentees	0 / 75

== Council of Government ==
The Council of Government is structured into the office for the president and 12 ministries.

← Rueda II Government → (15 April 2024 – present)
Portfolio	Name	Party	Took office	Left office	Ref.
President	Alfonso Rueda	PP	11 April 2024	Incumbent	
Minister of the Presidency, Justice and Sports	Diego Calvo	PP	15 April 2024	Incumbent	
Minister of Environment and Climate Change	Ángeles Vázquez	PP	15 April 2024	Incumbent	
Minister of Education, Science, Universities and Vocational Training	Román Rodríguez	PP	15 April 2024	Incumbent	
Minister of Social Policy and Equality	Fabiola García	PP	15 April 2024	Incumbent	
Minister of Economy and Industry	María Jesús Lorenzana	Independent	15 April 2024	Incumbent	
Minister of Finance and Public Administration	Miguel Corgos	PP	15 April 2024	Incumbent	
Minister of Housing and Infrastructure Planning	María Martínez Allegue	PP	15 April 2024	Incumbent	
Minister of Health	Antonio Gómez Caamaño	Independent	15 April 2024	Incumbent	
Minister of Culture, Language and Youth	José López Campos	PP	15 April 2024	Incumbent	
Minister of Employment, Commerce and Emigration	José González	PP	15 April 2024	Incumbent	
Minister of Rural Environment	María José Gómez	PP	15 April 2024	Incumbent	
Minister of the Sea	Alfonso Villares Bermúdez	PP	15 April 2024	Incumbent	

== Notes ==
Preceded by Rueda I	Government of Galicia; 2024–	Incumbent
