= Government of Alfonso Rueda =

Government of Alfonso Rueda could refer to:

- First government of Alfonso Rueda
- Second government of Alfonso Rueda
