= Dimas Gadelha =

Brazilian politician (born 1975)

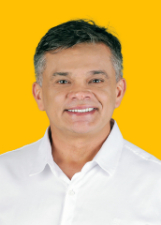
- Gadelha in 2024

Member of the Chamber of Deputies
- Incumbent
- Assumed office 1 February 2023
- Constituency: Rio de Janeiro

Personal details
- Born: 3 May 1975 (age 50)
- Party: Workers' Party (since 2020)

Dimas de Paiva Gadelha Junior (born 3 May 1975) is a Brazilian politician serving as a member of the Chamber of Deputies since 2023. From 2012 to 2013, he served as secretary of government of Magé. From 2014 to 2018, he served as secretary of health of São Gonçalo. From 2021 to 2022, he served as secretary of management and goals of Maricá.
