= Next PP national party congress =

- No later than 2029

All delegates in the National Congress Plurality of delegates needed to win
- Opinion polls
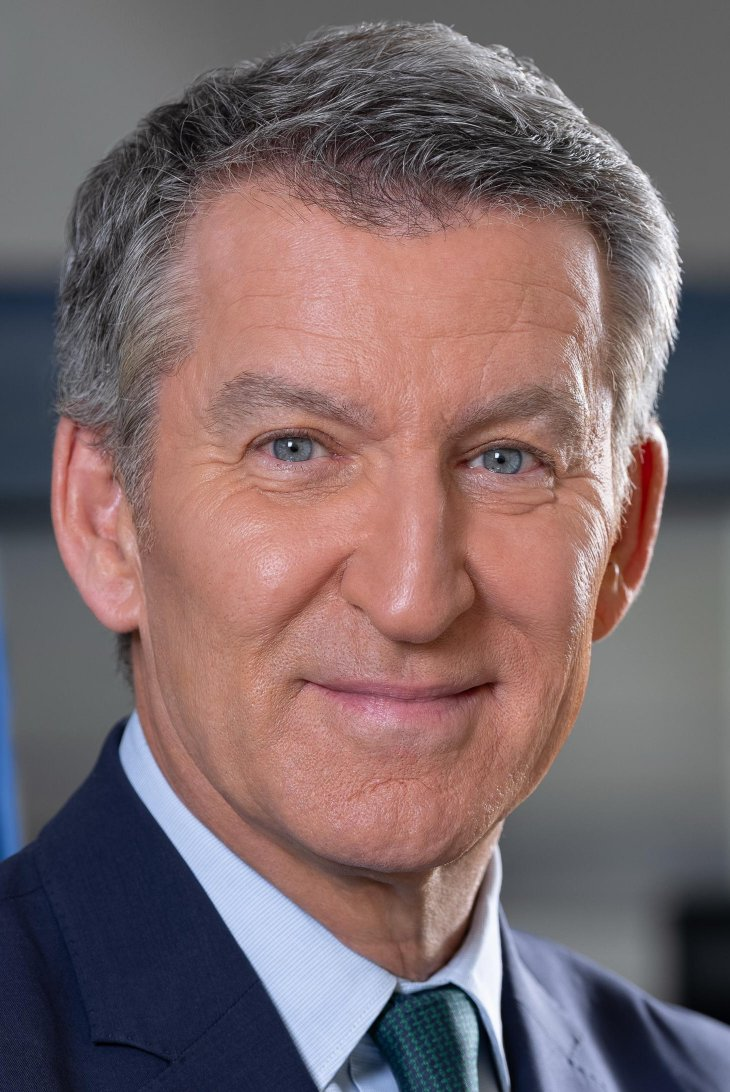
Candidate	Alberto Núñez Feijóo
Incumbent President
Alberto Núñez Feijóo

The People's Party (PP) is expected to hold its 22nd national congress no later than 2029, to renovate its governing bodies—including the post of president, which amounts to that of party leader—and establish the party platform and policy until the next congress.

== Overview ==
=== Role ===
The national congress of the PP is the party's highest decision-making body, having the power to define its platform and policy, amend its statutes and internal regulations and elect its national governing bodies, which include the executive committee (responsible for the party's day-to-day management under the coordination of a president, which is the party leader) and 30 members in the board of directors (made up of party notables and elected representatives, which is the PP's highest body between congresses).

Depending on whether a congress is held following the natural end of its term or due to any other exceptional circumstances, it can be of either ordinary or extraordinary nature. Ordinary congresses are to be held every four years and called at least two months in advance—though they can be postponed by the board of directors for up to 12 additional months in the event of coincidence with parliamentary elections—whereas extraordinary congresses could be called at least one-and-a-half month in advance by a two-thirds majority of the board of directors, though in cases of "exceptional urgency" this timetable could be reduced to 30 days.

=== Procedure ===
Decisions at PP party congresses are adopted through delegate voting. Congress delegates are either ex officio (comprising all members of the board of directors and up to 10 members of the congress's organizing committee) or elected in local assemblies by party members in good standing and with a minimum membership period of six months, using open list proportional representation, in a number at least four times as numerous as ex officio delegates. Elected delegates are distributed—either by the board of directors or by the organizing committee—among the party's regional branches, reserving at least 75 percent based on the number of members in good standing as of 31 December of the year prior to the congress's convening date, and a maximum of 25 percent based on the vote share obtained in the immediately preceding general election; New Generations—the PP's youth wing—is entitled to a number of congress delegates proportional to its membership, elected at their own assemblies, with a fixed and equal minimum number of delegates for each of its territorial branches.

Statutory amendments in 2025 reintroduced an indirect system for the election of the party president. Candidates seeking to run are required a minimum membership period of twelve months, as well as collect the endorsements of at least 500 members from a minimum of 25 provinces—with at least 15 endorsements in each province—and disallowing members from endorsing more than one candidate. Delegates are required to join the list of one of the presidential candidates before the local assemblies, remaining bound to such candidate in the congress votings in which the president will be elected.

== Candidates ==
Candidate	Notable positions
=== Incumbent ===
Incumbent president.
Alberto Núñez Feijóo (age 64)	Member of the Congress of Deputies for Madrid (since 2023); President of the PP (since 2022); Leader of the Opposition of Spain (since 2022); Senator appointed by the Parliament of Galicia (2022–2023); President of the Regional Government of Galicia (2009–2022); President of the PP of Galicia (2006–2022); Member of the Parliament of Galicia for Pontevedra (2005–2022); First Vice President of the Xunta de Galicia (2004–2005); Minister of Territorial Policy, Public Works and Housing of Galicia (2003–2005); President of the State Society of Mail and Telegraphs (2000–2003); Secretary-General for Healthcare of Spain (1996–2000)

== Opinion polls ==
Poll results are listed in the tables below in reverse chronological order, showing the most recent first, and using the date the survey's fieldwork was done, as opposed to the date of publication. If such date is unknown, the date of publication is given instead. The highest percentage figure in each polling survey is displayed in bold, and the background shaded in the candidate's colour. In the instance of a tie, the figures with the highest percentages are shaded. Polls show data gathered among PP voters/supporters as well as Spanish voters as a whole, but not among party members, who are the ones ultimately entitled to vote in the primary election.

=== PP voters ===
Polling firm/Commissioner	Fieldwork date	Sample size								Other /None	Question	Lead
Polling firm/Commissioner	Fieldwork date	Sample size	Feijóo (Inc.)	Ayuso	Azcón	Guardiola	L. Miras	Moreno	Rueda	Other /None	Question	Lead
Opina 360/Antena 3	25–30 Sep 2025	1,203	–	**54.4**	0.8	2.1	0.8	31.5	2.0	4.7	3.7	22.9

=== Spanish voters ===
Polling firm/Commissioner	Fieldwork date	Sample size								Other /None	Question	Lead
Polling firm/Commissioner	Fieldwork date	Sample size	Feijóo (Inc.)	Ayuso	Azcón	Guardiola	L. Miras	Moreno	Rueda	Other /None	Question	Lead
Opina 360/Antena 3	25–30 Sep 2025	1,203	–	**28.8**	1.0	2.9	2.2	19.4	1.4	36.3	8.0	9.4

== Bibliography ==
- Reglamento Marco de Congresos (PDF) (Party Regulation). People's Party (in Spanish). 4 September 2017 [version as of 28 May 2018].
- Estatutos Nacionales (21 Congreso) (PDF) (Party Statutes). People's Party (in Spanish). 6 July 2025.
