= Washington Quaquá =

Brazilian politician and sociologist (born 1971)

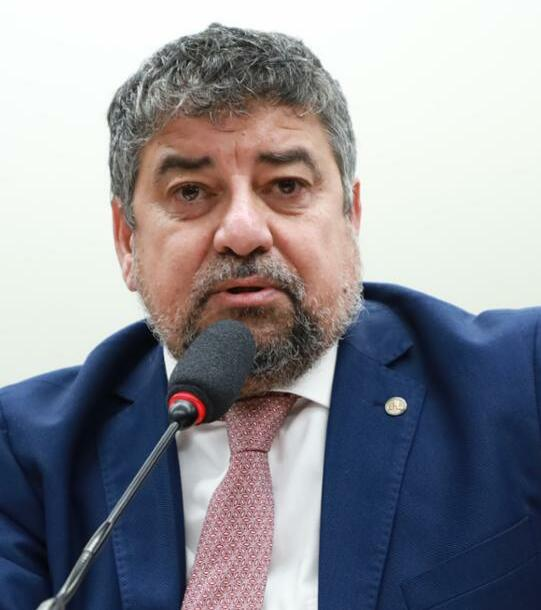

Mayor of Maricá
- Incumbent
- Assumed office 1 January 2025
- Vice Mayor: João Mauricio
- Preceded by: Fabiano Horta
- In office 1 January 2009 – 1 January 2017
- Vice Mayor: Uilton Viana (2009–2013); Marcos Ribeiro (2013–2017)
- Preceded by: Ricardo Queiroz
- Succeeded by: Fabiano Horta

Federal Deputy
- In office 1 February 2023 – 1 January 2025
- Constituency: Rio de Janeiro

Personal details
- Born: Washington Luiz Cardoso Siqueira; 31 March 1971 (age 55) Niterói, Rio de Janeiro, Brazil
- Party: PT (1989–present)
- Children: Diego Quaquá
- Occupation: Politician

Washington Luiz Cardoso Siqueira (born 31 March 1971), better known as Washington Quaquá (pronounced [ˈwɔʃĩtõ kwaˈkwa]), is a Brazilian politician, sociologist and member of the Workers' Party (PT). He is currently the party's vice president and member of the Chamber of Deputies representing the state of Rio de Janeiro. Quaquá had served as mayor of Maricá, Rio de Janeiro for two terms, being elected in 2008 and re-elected in 2012, succeeded by Fabiano Horta, from the same party.

In 2014 he implemented a free bus service in the city, using royalties resources from oil exploitation. Maricá was the first Brazilian municipality with more than 100,000 inhabitants to adopt a program of free public transit.

Quaquá was accused of using municipal social programs to boost his campaign. In 2013, he was convicted by the Electoral Justice for abuse of political party and conduct prohibited to public agents. However, the Regional Electoral Court of Rio de Janeiro did not revoke his mandate, choosing only to make him ineligible for 8 years.

On 25 June 2016, during his administration, he inaugurated a statue in tribute to guerrilla leader Che Guevara, in front of the homonymous municipal hospital. The inauguration ceremony had the presence of Aleida Guevara, Che's oldest daughter.

Political offices
Preceded by Ricardo Queiroz	Mayor of Maricá; 2009–2017	Succeeded by Fabiano Horta
Preceded by Fabiano Horta	Mayor of Maricá; 2025–present	Incumbent
