= José Quiroga Suárez =

Spanish politician (1920–2006)

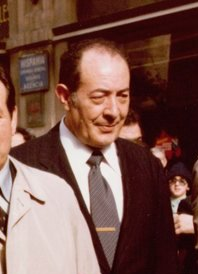
José Quiroga Suárez in 1979.

José Quiroga Suárez (4 July 1920 in Petín, Galicia − 18 October 2006 in A Rúa, Galicia) was a Spanish politician and the second president of the pre-autonomic community of Galicia before reaching its Statute of Autonomy in 1981.

Preceded by Antonio Rosón Pérez	President of the Regional Government of Galicia; 1979–1982	Succeeded by Xerardo Fernández Albor
