= Dositeo Rodríguez =

Spanish politician (1935 - 2020)

Minister of Presidency, Civil Service and Justice of Galicia
- In office 1990–1999
- Preceded by: Pablo González Mariñas
- Succeeded by: Jaime Pita Varela

Member of the Parliament of Galicia
- In office 1993–1999

Personal details
- Born: 17 September 1935; Ribas de Sil, Spain
- Died: 27 March 2020 (aged 84); Santiago de Compostela, Spain
- Political party: People's Party of Galicia (PPdeG)
- Occupation: Lawyer and politician

Dositeo Rodríguez Rodríguez (17 September 1935 – 27 March 2020), was a Spanish lawyer, politician, and member of the People's Party of Galicia.

== Biography and career ==
=== Early career ===
Dositeo Rodríguez was born in San Clodio, Ribas de Sil, province of Lugo on 17 September 1935, where his father was a railwayman and head of a train station. His family moved to Lugo and opened the restaurant "La Barra". He got a degree in Laws, was a professor of commerce and comptroller of the State Administration. In 1979 he became manager of the University of Santiago de Compostela, so he moved with his children and wife to Santiago de Compostela.

=== Political career ===
He was a member of the Union of the Democratic Centre, but after the decomposition of this party in 1983 Rodríguez joined People's Alliance and later joined its successor party, People's Party (PP). Amid the 1989 Galician regional election, Manuel Fraga, PP's founder and candidate to the presidency of Galicia, made Rodríguez manage the electoral campaign. With the victory of the conservative party, Fraga nominated Rodríguez as Minister of Presidency, Civil Service and Justice of Galicia, an office he assumed on 2 February 1990 and held until 1999 to be a candidate for the municipal elections.

In the 1993 regional elections he won a seat in the Galician parliament and was re-elected in the 1997 election, until 1999 when he left the office.

He entered municipal politics as a candidate in the 1999 municipal elections for mayor of Santiago de Compostela. He won with 11 councilors, but the Spanish Socialist Workers' Party (PSOE) candidate and incumbent mayor Xosé Sánchez Bugallo kept the post thanks to a pact with BNG. Rodríguez exercised a constructive and collaborative opposition. Rodríguez ran again for mayor in the 2003 municipal elections, but he did not succeed either. On 22 May 2006 he stepped down as spokesman of the PP municipal group and left his position as councilman, once his successor as candidate for the next municipal elections was known.

=== Judicial procedure and acquittal ===
In June 2015, a judge charged Dositeo Rodríguez for his management as patron of the "Fundación Camilo José Cela" in a case investigating possible embezzlement, fraud and misappropriation of several people linked to the foundation. Rodríguez testified in instruction as a defendant in court on 23 July 2015 pleading his innocence. The trial was held before the Provincial Court of A Coruña on 1 April 2019 and the prosecution asked for four and a half years in prison, the same as for his daughter, Covadonga Rodríguez, also charged for the same crimes.

On 22 January 2020, all the defendants were acquitted.

== Personal life and death ==
He had four children with his wife.

In March 2020, Rodríguez traveled with his wife to Lloret de Mar, in Catalonia, on a trip organized by the Spanish Institute for the Elderly and Social Services (IMSERSO). It was there he was infected with COVID-19 during the COVID-19 pandemic in Spain, being diagnosed when he returned to Galicia. Two days after being admitted to the ICU of the Complexo Hospitalario Universitario of Santiago de Compostela, he succumbed to the infection on 27 March, at the age of 84.
