= Jardim Catarina =

Jardim Catarina is a district of São Gonçalo in Rio de Janeiro that belongs to the third district of the city called Monjolos. This district is named after the large amount of tree (water mill) in the region. This district was created by state decree 641 of 15 December 1938 and designated as the 3rd District in 1063 by state law of 28 January 1944. this district had been explored long limestone for cement production by the National Company of Portland cement in Guaxindiba. Jardim Catarina is considered the largest subdivision and neighborhood of Latin America, despite having a strip of land smaller than other neighborhoods located in Sao Goncalo, received this title due to large amount of 12x30m plots. The neighborhood is situated at sea level and its total area is larger than the municipality from Curitiba. The origin goes back to the Jardin Catherine old Orangery Farm, whose owner was Mr. Julio Pedroso Lima who bought on June 26, 1903 Bank of the Republic of Brazil S / A. This ranch house next door had a large chapel, fifteen houses for settlers on the farm, the mill and Rural School (for children of settlers on the farm). After the death of its owner in 1925, was donated to the school hall. Since 1947, Julio Pedroso Lima Junior, son of the owner of Finance sold a few plots of land to Bishop John Matta, in the town now called Santa Luzia that donated a portion of land for construction of a chapel and elsewhere to increase the area of the school grounds. The houses built on the farm were donated to the residents (settlers and squatters). In 1932, the farm is now run by his nephew Americo Lima. Was subdivided by his grandson Antonio de Lima Barros Filho. Its shares gave rise to existing neighborhoods Orangery, Santa Luzia and Boa Vista Jardim Catarina.

== Rivers ==
Jardim Catarina is cut by the Alcantara River which has a length of 25 km. The drainage site is currently done by Walloons surrounding neighborhood, which stretches for having committed the narrow flow of water causing frequent floods. With the lack of drainage works in a direct compromise with the existing health facilities.

Among other existing gutters in the neighborhood, the Precious Wallonia, the Walloon Cedae Garden and Catherine had their works prioritized by the project because they are considered the most important in solving the problems previously faced by this community.

Located in the neighborhood Walloon Garden Catarina has a drainage area of approximately 1.7 km2 pouring their areas in the channel Isaura Santana, who in turn forwards its waters until the Guaxindiba River which flows into Guanabara Bay. The present course of Walloon Garden Catarina extends about 3 km, crossing busy areas of the neighborhood, returning home and lots, making his way is very sinuous, and intercept the BR 101.

Already the Walloon CEDAE - drainage area 3.2 km2, developing since the RFFSA until its confluence with the River Alcantara a length of about 2.4 km.

== Climate ==
The climate in Jardim Catarina is what is seen throughout the city of São Gonçalo mild and dry (20 to 35).

== The neighborhood ==
The neighborhood is located in the municipality of São Gonçalo, part of the district water mill, which is the 3rd district of the municipality of Sao Goncalo. The neighborhood is bordered on the north and south and east respectively by Amaral Peixoto Highway (RJ-104) and the channel Gill in 1975 there was an appreciation of the lots, with the emergence of new industry along Route 104. Thus the district has different sections: Jardim Catarina old, new and newest respectively.

The development of the settlement has undergone great changes, a major was the opening of the Rio-Niterói Bridge in 1974 and construction of highway BR 101. At the beginning of the 80s, crossed the allotment modifying its internal structure and promoting the occupation of the area north of the old sector. Currently the lots are laid out, with houses in brick, although the residences have satisfactory standards, the district has no infrastructure and urbanization sufficient local demand. The main problem is sewage that has its decaying facilities, and it was great presence of graves in the open as an alternative to collecting systems.

Reside in the district unofficially, around 200.00 people economically composed of a small part of an emerging middle class and the other composed entirely of employees, under-employed and freelancers. Most have trained manpower and not specialized in construction (masons, helpers, carpenters, painters, laborers and others), salespeople, mechanics, school teachers who do not exercise the function and the camels. It has been in the neighborhood several micro and small enterprises. Large portion of residents are illiterate and the primary school, some with first-degree and second complete incomplete. With high school portion is very small and not significant if you have a count of students because it is very rare.

The local market is quite diverse along major roads (5), can be found all products for the everyday: food, construction materials and so on ... except clothing, which leads the resident moves to Alcantara Niteroi and Rio de Janeiro. Another strong point of the neighborhood is the provision of services. They are many varied. With professional and technical expertise in construction, electricity, cars etc. .. It also has small business mostly informal in various activities, mainly focused on the production and installation of iron gates, roofs, windows etc. ...

Professionals related to the automotive sector as the traditional workshop electric automobiles BIGODE located near the bridge of the BR-101.

Like most regions of the low income population subdivision has problems relating to education, health, employment, income poor circulation, road infrastructure, transport and high crime rates.

== Neighborhood statistics ==
★Streets and avenues = 176

★lots = 25 thousand lots

★Number of electors = 19,291 (1998 figures)

★Health care centers = 3

- Polo Sanitary Goulart
- Health post Jorge Teixeira de Lima
- Garden Tour Catarina

★State schools = 4

- Transilbo Figueiras
- Abigail Carter
- David Quinderé
- Anita Garibaldi

★Public schools = 2

- Irene Barbosa Ornellas
- Nicanor Ferreira Nunes

★Bus lines = 7

- 4 municipal
- 3 intermunicipal

★Community Centers = 2

★Associations residents = 3

- AMJAC (Association of Residents of Jardim Catarina - founded in 1963)
- AMAJAC (Association of Residents and friends of Catherine Gardens - founded in 1981)
- AMOJACAN (Association for residents of New Garden Catarina - founded in 1995)

★Division Jardim Catarina = 3 shares

- Party Urbanized: Among the avenues Santa Catarina, Rua Padre Vieira and Nicholas Touquet and BR 101. Part between the streets Olegario da Costa and Marcos Nascimento and the streets of Fine Gold and ivory.
- Quilombo: Between Rua Ouro Fino and BR-101 and between the streets and son Ari Luis Ribeiro de Azevedo.
- Ipuca: From the Streets Father Manoel de Sa and the Alcantara River and the streets of Castro and Rodrigues Piracajuba. Part between the Alcantara River and Br-101 and between the streets and Anastacio Rosas Soares dos Reis.

== Trade ==
The trade of the district focuses on the major streets in the subdivision, generally in the streets that cross the blending and forth from north to south. We found in this segment, midsize supermarket, shops of building materials, rental of videos and a lot of bars and eateries.

== Transport ==
The transport is made by the district roads and river ita Auto Icaraí operating the bus segintes lines:

483 (Rio Ita) - Jardim Catarina x Niterói.

12 and 13 - x Jardim Catarina Neves.

Cooperative Vans - Alcantara x Jardim Catarina.

== Leisure ==
The Jardim Catarina for being a very poor neighborhood, does not have many recreational areas. in the neighborhood there are a few football fields that mainly on Sundays are filled m virtue of organizing tournaments and championships. The main fields are: 6 fields located in the marshland (Jardim Catarina Velho), 1 located near the end point of the "Rio Ita. Field called Ox, 3 located in Ipuca, called "Federal, Hunting talents and Eco" .. field types and numerous clubs.

Another meeting place is the square, located between the 27th and 28th Streets of Old Garden Catarina, where he also located the "Cultural Tent" that occasionally there are shows. Occasionally been seen in some "Circus" and "Parks" which are the delight of neighborhood children.

== Oddities ==
In the neighborhood of Jardim Catarina, residents are mostly migrants from the northeast, which is stabilized taking root here.

Recently two small industries have settled in the Garden Catarina;

The Angels & Esteves LTDA ME industry of plastic disposable hospital use and Api Sun Natural products, industry-derived honey applied pharmacology.

Another striking fact in the district is the number of Protestant churches on the site that has an important social role in the redemption of the world's youth from drugs and violence among them is the Evangelical Community Garden Catarina located between the old streets 45 and 46 blending old.

There is the Jardim Catarina sheds three acclimation of bananas. In the largest of the three, are matured in 550 boxes per week with about 28 kg each. The deposit consists of five chambers 5 x 4 x 4m. the purchase price and $ 10, 00 and the entire product comes from the state of Santa Catarina and its destiny is a shop inside the CEASA-RJ.
