= Maricá Airport =

Airport serving Maricá, Brazil

Laélio Baptista Airport Aeroporto Laélio Baptista
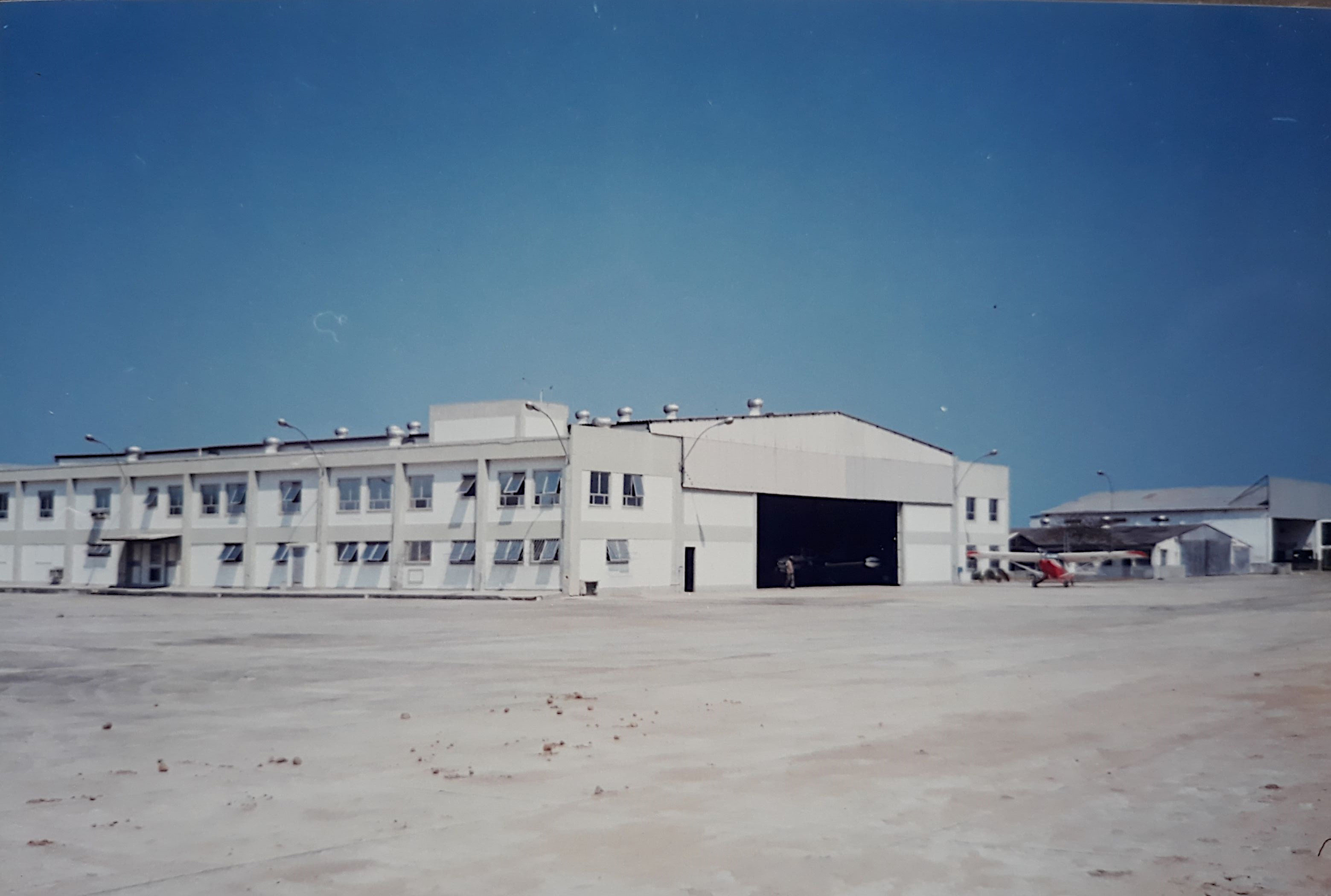
- IATA: JMR; ICAO: SBMI; LID: RJ0009

Summary
- Airport type: Public
- Operator: Maricá
- Serves: Maricá
- Opened: 1972; 54 years ago
- Time zone: BRT (UTC−03:00)
- Elevation AMSL: 2 m / 5 ft
- Coordinates: 22°55′05″S 042°49′44″W

Map
- Location in Brazil JMR (Brazil)

Runways
Direction	Length		Surface
Direction	m	ft	Surface
09/27	1,190	3,904	Asphalt
- Sources: ANAC, DECEA

Laélio Baptista Airport (IATA: JMR, ICAO: SBMI) formerly SDMC, is the airport serving Maricá, Brazil.

== Airlines and destinations ==
No scheduled flights operate at this airport.

== Access ==
The airport is located 1 km (1 mi) from downtown Maricá.

== Gallery ==
Some views from Maricá Airport in 1994

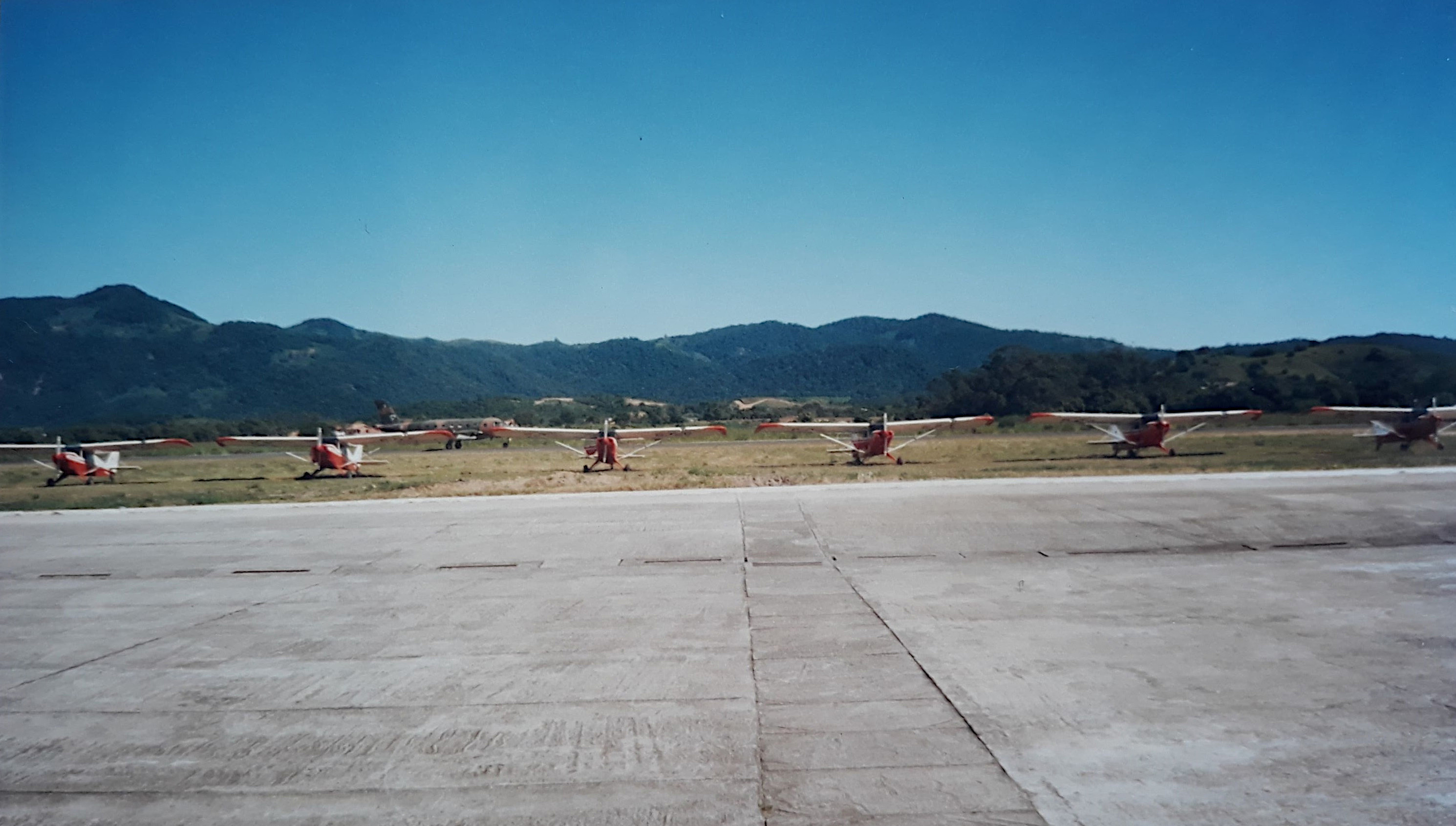

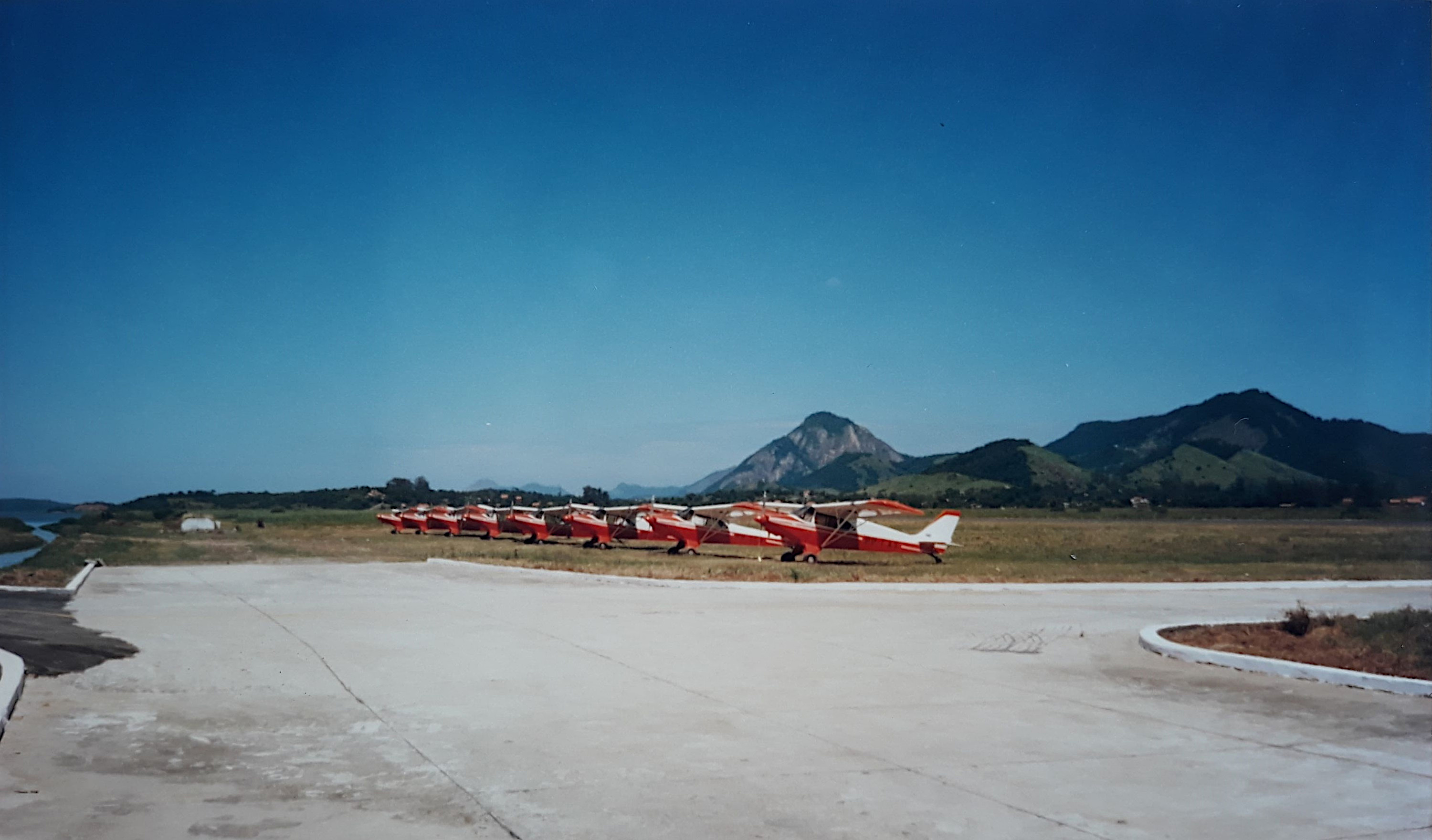

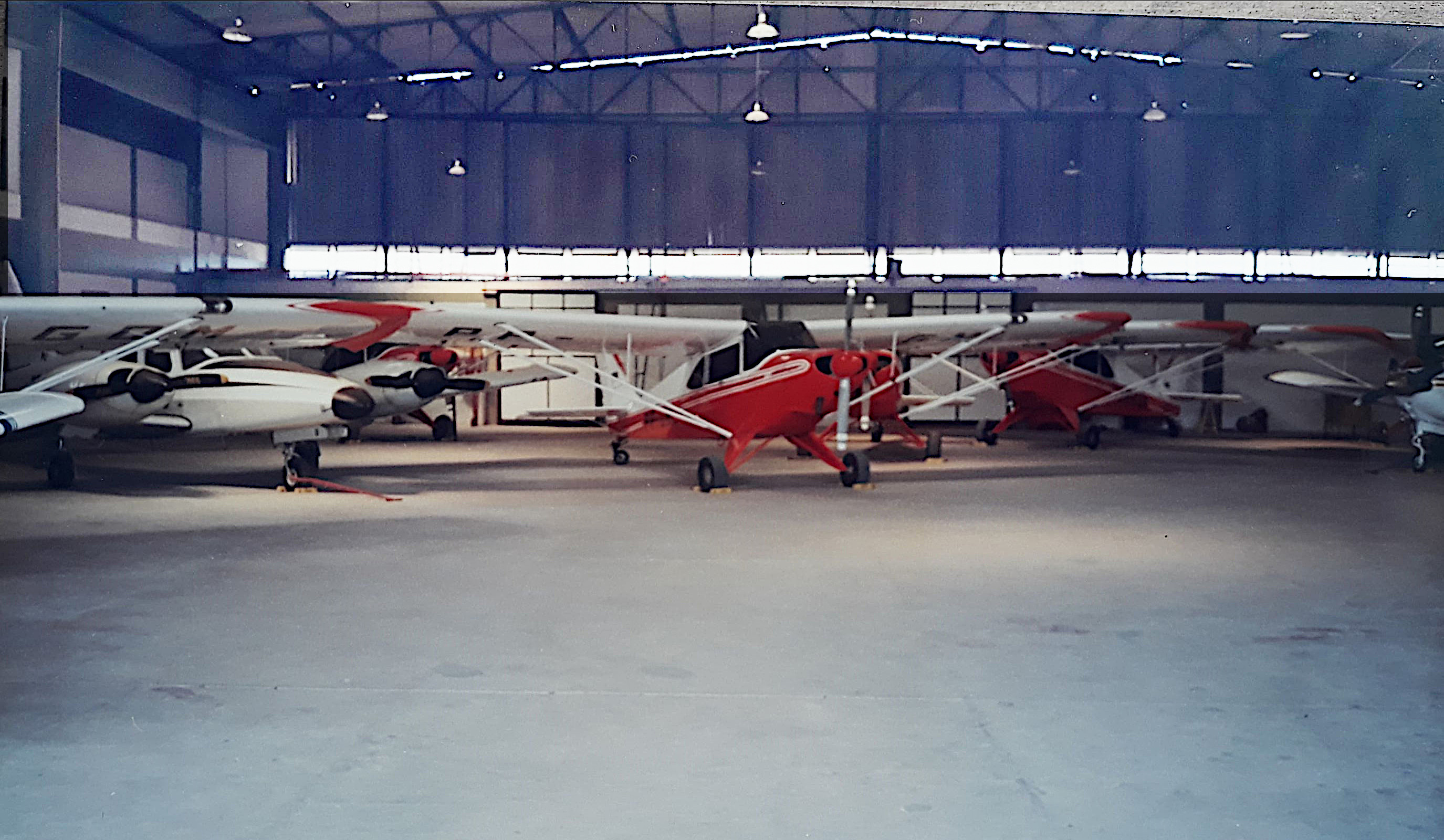

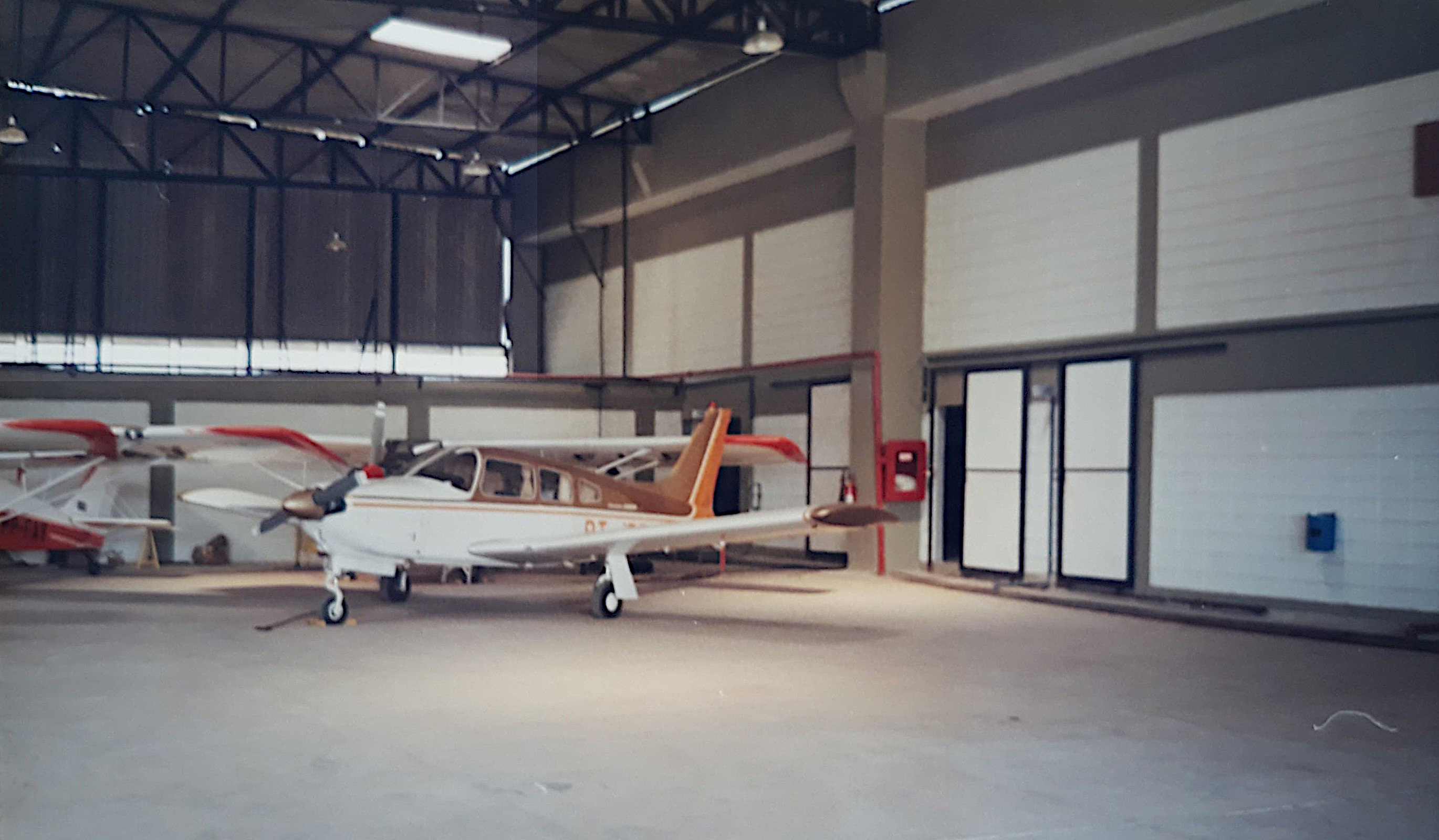

== See also ==
- List of airports in Brazil
