= Diego Quaquá =

Brazilian politician (born 1998)

- Quaquá in 2026

Member-elect of the Chamber of Deputies
- Assuming office 1 February 2027
- Constituency: Rio de Janeiro

Vice Mayor of Maricá
- In office 1 January 2021 – 1 January 2025
- Mayor: Fabiano Horta
- Preceded by: Marcos Ribeiro
- Succeeded by: João Maurício

Personal details
- Born: Diego Zeidan Cardoso Siqueira; 24 September 1998 (age 28) Niterói, Rio de Janeiro, Brazil
- Party: PT
- Parent: Washington Quaquá (father)
- Education: Fluminense Federal University

Diego Zeidan Cardoso Siqueira (born 24 September 1998), better known as Diego Quaquá, is a Brazilian politician who was elected member of the Chamber of Deputies in 2026. He has served as chairman of the Workers' Party in Rio de Janeiro since 2025. He is the son of Washington Quaquá and Zeidan.
