= Diego Vargas =

Diego Vargas may refer to:

- Diego Vargas (bishop) (died 1633), Italian bishop
- Diego Vargas (footballer) (born 1998), Spanish footballer
