= São Gonçalo, Rio de Janeiro =

São Gonçalo
- Municipality
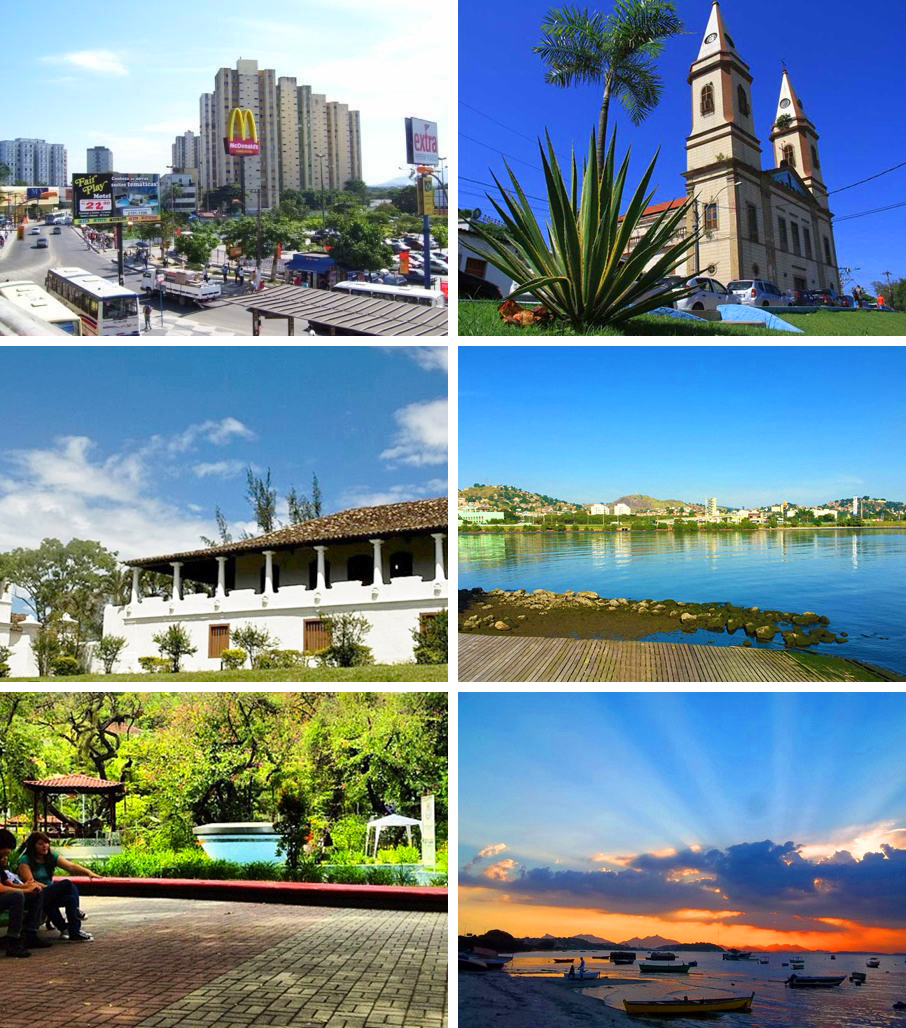

- Flag Coat of arms
- Nickname: Manchester Fluminense
- Location in Rio de Janeiro

- Localization in Brazil
- Coordinates: 22°49′37″S 43°03′14″W
- Country: Brazil
- Region: Southeast
- State: Rio de Janeiro
- City Established: 22 September 1890

Government
  - Type: Mayor-council
  - Body: Prefeitura de São Gonçalo
  - Mayor: Capitão Nelson (Avante)

Area
  - Total: 249.143 km^{2} (96.195 sq mi)
- Elevation: 19 m (62 ft)

Population (2025)
  - Total: 960,652
  - Density: 3,855.83/km^{2} (9,986.54/sq mi)
- Demonym: gonçalense
- Time zone: UTC−3 (BRT)
- Area code: +55 21

São Gonçalo (Portuguese: [sɐ̃w ɡõˈsalu]) is a municipality in Rio de Janeiro, Brazil, in the Southeast region. It is located in the Metropolitan Region of Rio de Janeiro, having land limits with the municipalities of Niterói, Maricá and Itaboraí, and a maritime limit, by Guanabara Bay, with the capital, Rio de Janeiro. According to the 2022 census, it has a population of 960,652 inhabitants, making it the second most populous municipality in the state and the 18th most populous in the country.

== History ==
The current Brazilian territory had been inhabited since at least 10,000 BC by people from other continents. Around the year 1000, the Tapuia people who inhabited the region currently occupied by the municipality were expelled to the interior of the continent due to the arrival of Tupi people from the Amazon.

=== 16th century ===
In the 16th century, when the first Europeans arrived in the region, it was inhabited by one of these Tupi people: the Tupinambás, who would later be part of the Tamoios Confederation. Archaeological remains indicate that a place especially inhabited by the Tupinambás in the municipality was the island of Itaóca. The coast of Rio de Janeiro, as well as São Gonçalo, was the scene, in the 16th century, of the revolt known as the Confederation of Tamoios, which united the Tupinambás, Tupiniquins, Aimorés, and Temiminós tribes and the French explorers against the Portuguese.

The end of the revolt came with the strengthening of Portuguese colonization, with the Portuguese attacking the indigenous villages, killing and enslaving the population. In 1567, with the arrival of reinforcements for the Portuguese captain-general Estácio de Sá, who had founded the village of São Sebastião in Rio de Janeiro two years earlier, the final stage of expulsion of the French and their Tamoio allies began, with the final decimation of the Tupinambás in the region taking place. The Tupinambás withdrew from the region of the current city of Rio de Janeiro, first towards Guanabara Bay and, later, towards Cabo Frio.

On April 6, 1579, the nobleman Gonçalo Gonçalves received from the governor of the Captaincy of Rio de Janeiro, the land located on the banks of the Imboaçu River, with the duty of building a chapel and a village within a period of three years. He built a chapel with the saint of his devotion, São Gonçalo de Amarante.

=== 17th century ===
The European settlement of São Gonçalo, which began at the end of the 16th century, was led by Jesuit priests, who, at the beginning of the 17th century, established a farm in the area known as Colubandê, near the current RJ-104 highway. This farm still exists today and is a tourist attraction in São Gonçalo.

On October 26, 1644, the parish was created. On February 10, 1647, the parish was confirmed. According to records at the time, the main town occupied an area of 52 km^{2}, with approximately 6,000 inhabitants, being transformed into a parish. Aiming to facilitate communication, the headquarters was later transferred to the banks of the Imboaçu River, where a second chapel was built. The set of historical landmarks remaining from the 17th century includes the Nossa Senhora da Boa Esperança Farm in Ipiiba and the property of captain Miguel Frias de Vasconcelos, in Engenho Pequeno, the Chapel of São João in Porto do Gradim, and Fazenda da Luz in Itaóca.

In 1660–1661, the farmers of São Gonçalo and Niterói rebelled against the collection of taxes related to the production of cachaça and marched in arms to the city of Rio de Janeiro, where they deposed the governor. This episode became known as the Cachaça Revolt.

=== 19th century ===
On May 10, 1819, its status as a parish was suspended, becoming a district of the Village of Niterói.

In 1860, thirty sugarcane mills were already exporting sugar through the ports of Guaxindiba, Boaçu, Porto Velho, and Pontal. Until the 20th century, São Gonçalo had around twelve ports that exported products from the state of Rio de Janeiro to the court.

On September 22, 1890, the District of São Gonçalo was elevated to a town and municipality through State Decree 124.

In 1892, Decree One, of May 8, suppressed the municipality of São Gonçalo, reincorporating it into Niterói for a brief period of seven months, being restored by Decree 34, of December 7 of the same year.

=== 20th century ===
In 1922, São Gonçalo was elevated to the category of city, which was revoked in 1923, making the city revert to the category of town.

In 1943, a new territorial division occurred in the state of Rio de Janeiro, and this time, São Gonçalo lost the district of Itaipu to the municipality of Niterói, leaving only five districts, namely: São Gonçalo, Ipiiba, Monjolos, Neves, and Sete Pontes.

During the same period, in the 1940s and 1950s, large-scale installation of large factories and industries began in the municipality. Its industrial park was the most important in the state of Rio de Janeiro, which earned it the nickname "Manchester Fluminense".

=== Industrial sector ===
On April 17, 1925, the Brazilian Company of Metallurgical Plants established itself in the municipality. Later, this plant was incorporated into the Hime Group, which, in addition to foundry and ceramics, developed the production of phosphorus, with the Brazilian Phosphorus Company, which operated within its metallurgical area. The company also maintained a primary school and a cutting and sewing school. Later, Hime was acquired by Gerdau.

On December 2, 1937, José Emílio Tarragó, from Rio Grande do Sul, founded, under the corporate name Tarragó, Martínez e Cia Ltda., the future Coqueiro, a fish canning industry. The change in the company's name was due to the change in the line of business. The first activity of this industry was related to the exploitation of tamarind. When moving into the fish canning business, the industry had to change its name. The new company prospered, and the Coqueiro brand gained national and international recognition. In 1973, Quaker Oats purchased the factory and consolidated the Coqueiro brand, in addition to expanding its market leadership.

On February 9, 1941, José Augusto Domingues founded the Fábrica de Artefatos de Cimento Armado, producing cobblestones and curbs. On October 5, 1941, Indústria Reunidas Mauá was established in the district of Neves, which produced glass and porcelain. On November 16, 1941, Companhia Vidreira do Brasil was founded. It was the first in Brazil and the largest in South America in the mechanical manufacture of flat glass, with exports to Egypt, India, and South Africa. Over time, it changed owners and name to Vidrobrás and, currently, Electrovidro. The raw material for this industry came from Maricá. On November 22, 1941, the Sardinha Neptune Canning Factory was installed, close to Porto do Gradim. On May 10, 1942, Fábrica de Fogos Santo Antônio was founded.

During the Second World War, São Gonçalo grew meteorically. With the large farms being divided, cheap and abundant labor, large areas, in addition to the proximity to the then federal (city of Rio de Janeiro) and state (Niterói) capitals, which facilitated the flow of production, São Gonçalo became fertile soil for development.

During Joaquim Lavoura's government, the municipality had a major push towards urbanization, paving the main roads, connecting Niterói to Alcântara, passing through the important Parada 40 neighborhood. Lavoura governed São Gonçalo three times (from 31 from January 1955 to January 20, 1959, from January 31, 1963, to January 30, 1967, and from January 31, 1973, to August 12, 1975).

== Geography ==
São Gonçalo is made up of crystalline terrain, divided into massifs and coastal hills.

The municipality contains 4% of the 1,936-hectare (4,780-acre) Guanabara Ecological Station, created in 2006. It contains part of the Central Rio de Janeiro Atlantic Forest Mosaic of conservation units, created in 2006.

=== Climate ===
The climate in São Gonçalo is tropical and subtropical, with summer rain and a relatively dry winter. Temperatures vary relatively throughout the year, with hot and humid summers, with an average temperature of 28 °C, and peaks of up to 38 to 40 °C. During winter, the days are sunnier, and temperatures are milder, averaging 21 °C during the day and 15 °C at night. Due to the presence of the Atlantic Polar Mass, temperatures during the day can be below 18 °C and have minimum temperatures in the early morning hours close to 10 °C.

== Demography ==
Historical population
Year	Pop.	±%
1970	430,271	—
1980	615,351	+43.0%
1991	779,832	+26.7%
2000	891,119	+14.3%
2010	999,728	+12.2%
2022	896,744	−10.3%

According to the 2022 census, São Gonçalo has a population of 896,744 inhabitants, making it the second most populous municipality in the state and the 18th most populous in the country.

In 2022, the municipality was 35,59% Protestant, 35,21% Catholic, 18,33% with no religion, 2,34% Spiritist, among other religions and faiths. In 2022, 45.9% of the population was multiethnic, 36.9% was white, 17.0% was black, 0.1% was East Asian and 0.1% was indigenous.

== Subdivisions ==
São Gonçalo is administratively divided into 5 distritos (districts) and 110 bairros (neighborhoods).

- 1º Distrito - São Gonçalo: Antonina, Boaçu, Brasilândia I, Centro, Colubandê, Cruzeiro do Sul, Engenho Pequeno I, Estrela do Norte, Fazenda dos Mineiros, Galo Branco, Itaóca, Itaúna, Jardim Alcântara, Lindo Parque I, Luiz Caçador, Mutondo, Mutuá, Mutuaguaçu, Mutuapira, Nova Cidade, Palmeiras, Pedro de Alcântara, Porto do Rosa, Recanto das Acácias, Rocha, Salgueiro, São Miguel, Tribobó I, Trindade, Vila Yara and Zé Garoto I.
- 2º Distrito - Ipiíba: Almerinda, Amendoeira, Anaia Grande, Anaia Pequeno, Arrastão, Arsenal, Coelho, Eliane, Engenho do Roçado, Ieda, Ipiíba, Jardim Amendoeira, Jardim Nova República, Jockey, Lagoinha I, Largo da Ideia I, Maria Paula I, Pacheco I, Raul Veiga I, Rio do Ouro, Sacramento I, Santa Isabel, Tiradentes, Tribobó II, Várzea das Moças and Vila Candoza.
- 3º Distrito - Monjolo: Apolo III, Barracão, Bom Retiro, Gebara, Guarani, Guaxindiba, Jardim Catarina, Lagoinha II, Laranjal, Largo da Ideia II, Marambaia, Miriambi, Monjolo, Pacheco II, Raul Veiga II, Sacramento II, Santa Luzia, Vila Três and Vista Alegre.
- 4º Distrito - Neves: Barro Vermelho I, Boa Vista, Brasilândia II, Camarão, Covanca I, Gradim, Mangueira, Neves I, Parada 40, Paraíso, Patronato, Pita I, Porto da Madama, Porto da Pedra, Porto Novo, Porto Velho, Rosane, Santa Catarina I, Vila Lage and Zé Garoto II.
- 5º Distrito - Sete Pontes: Barro Vermelho II, Convanca II, Engenho Pequeno II, Lindo Parque II, Maria Paula II, Morro do Castro, Neves II, Novo México, Pita II, Santa Catarina II, Tenente Jardim, Tribobó II, Venda da Cruz and Zumbi.

== Education ==
The Rio de Janeiro State Teachers Training College (FFP-UERJ) stands out in the city. It is the largest teachers' college in the state of Rio de Janeiro, offering advanced training for senior staff. The campus offers undergraduate courses in Biological Sciences, History, Geography, Portuguese, Literature, English, Mathematics, and Pedagogy.

The Open University of Brazil Center was created in Gradim, which offers courses from the Fluminense Federal University (Computer Sciences and Mathematics), the Federal University of Rio de Janeiro (Chemistry and Physics), and the Federal Rural University of Rio de Janeiro (Administration and Tourism).

The city is also known for the private university Universidade Salgado de Oliveira (UNIVERSO), which started in the neighborhood of Trindade and offers multiple graduation courses. The São Gonçalo campus is recognized for being the starting place of the university, where it holds the older Colégio Dom Helder Câmara (children's education and highschool) and for its legal practice center, which offers many free services for the community.

== Health ==
São Gonçalo has eight major hospitals:

- Hospital Estadual Alberto Torres.
- Hospital Luiz Palmier.
- Hospital Barone de Medeiros.
- Hospital Infantil Darcy Silveira Vargas.
- Hospital Santa Maria.
- Hospital e Clínica de São Gonçalo.
- Hospital São José dos Lírios.
- Casa de Saúde Nossa Senhora das Neves.

== Notable people ==
- Black Alien, singer, rapper.
- Helton Arruda, goalkeeper.
- Zizinho, former Brazilian professional footballer
- Vinícius Júnior, a professional footballer currently playing for Real Madrid.
- Ibson, Brazilian professional footballer
- Vinícius Pacheco, Brazilian professional footballer.
- Isac Santos, volleyball player
- Claudinho & Buchecha, singers, funk carioca

== See also ==
- Jardim Catarina
