= Diego (footballer, born May 1986) =

Brazilian footballer

Personal information
- Full name: Diego Dionatas dos Santos Oliveira
- Date of birth: May 1, 1986 (age 40)
- Place of birth: Valparaíso, Brazil
- Height: 1.86 m (6 ft 1 in)
- Position: Goalkeeper

Team information
- Current team: Desportivo Brasil

Youth career
- 2004–2005: SE Matsubara

Senior career*
Years	Team	Apps	(Gls)
2005–2007	Avaí FC		
2008–2009	Ituano FC		
2009	Desportivo Brasil		
2010	CA Taquaritinga		
2010	Desportivo Brasil		
2011	Duque de Caxias		
2012–	Desportivo Brasil		
- * Club domestic league appearances and goals

Diego Dionatas dos Santos or simply Diego (born May 5, 1986, in Valparaíso), is a Brazilian goalkeeper, who is currently playing for the Brazilian team Desportivo Brasil.
