= Diego Castillo =

Diego Castillo may refer to:

- Diego Castillo (swimmer) (born 1991), Panamanian swimmer
- Diego Castillo (pitcher) (born 1994), Dominican baseball pitcher
- Diego Castillo (infielder) (born 1997), Venezuelan baseball infielder
- Diego Castillo (badminton) (born 2001), Chilean badminton player
