= Diego Morales =

Diego Morales may refer to:

- Diego Morales (boxer) (born 1979), Mexican boxer
- Diego Alberto Morales (born 1986), Argentine football striker for LDU Quito
- Diego Hernán Morales (born 1983), Argentine football goalkeeper for Alianza Universidad
- Diego Morales (politician) (born 1979), Guatemalan-American politician
- Diego Morales (born 1982), Chilean electronic musician
