= Diego Souza =

Diego Souza or Diego de Souza may refer to:

- Diego Souza (footballer, born 1985) (Diego de Souza Andrade), Brazilian footballer
- Diego de Souza (footballer, born 1984) (Diego Alejandro de Souza Carballo), Uruguayan footballer
- Diego Souza (footballer, born 1984) (Diego de Souza Gama Silva), Brazilian footballer
- Diego Souza (footballer, born 1993) (Diego de Souza Xavier), Brazilian footballer
- Dyego Sousa, Portuguese footballer
