= Diego Cor =

Uruguayan footballer (born 2000)

Personal information
- Full name: Diego Agustín Cor Morales
- Date of birth: 6 July 2000 (age 26)
- Place of birth: Durazno, Uruguay
- Height: 1.73 m (5 ft 8 in)
- Position: Forward

Team information
- Current team: Albion

Youth career
- Centro Sportivo Union Juvenil
- Liverpool Montevideo

Senior career*
Years	Team	Apps	(Gls)
2020–2022	Liverpool Montevideo	9	(1)
2022	→ Sud América (loan)	15	(0)
2023–2024	Sud América	30	(1)
2024–	Albion	1	(0)
- * Club domestic league appearances and goals as of 13 September 2024

Diego Agustín Cor Morales (born 6 July 2000) is a Uruguayan professional footballer who plays as a forward for Albion.

== Career ==
A youth academy graduate of Liverpool Montevideo, Cor made his professional debut on 10 September 2020 in a league match against Danubio. He came on as a 62nd minute substitute for Ignacio Ramírez as his side won the match with a scoreline of 2–1. He scored his first professional goal on 11 October 2020 in a 3–2 win against Boston River.

== Personal life ==
Cor is the son of former footballer Luis Cor, who has played for several Uruguayan clubs.

== Career statistics ==
=== Club ===
As of 12 November 2020

Appearances and goals by club, season and competition
Club	Season	League			Cup		Continental		Other		Total	
Club	Season	Division	Apps	Goals	Apps	Goals	Apps	Goals	Apps	Goals	Apps	Goals
Liverpool Montevideo	2020	Primera División	7	1	–		2 (Note: Appearances in Copa Sudamericana.)	0	0	0	9	1
Career total			7	1	0	0	2	0	0	0	9	1
