= Diego Ribas (footballer, born 1980) =

Uruguayan footballer (born 1980)

Personal information
- Full name: Diego Sebastián Ribas García
- Date of birth: 25 June 1980 (age 46)
- Place of birth: Montevideo, Uruguay
- Height: 1.85 m (6 ft 1 in)

Senior career*
Years	Team	Apps	(Gls)
1999	Cerro		
2000–2002	Basañez	?	(1)
2003	Liverpool		
2004	Nacional		
2005	Defensor Sporting		
2006	Uruguay Montevideo		
- * Club domestic league appearances and goals

Diego Sebastián Ribas García (born 25 June 1980 in Montevideo) is a Uruguayan footballer. He last known played for Uruguay Montevideo.

He scored 2 goals in first half of the 2006–07 Segunda División Uruguay with Uruguay Montevideo.

He also scored one goal in 2002 with Basañez in the Segunda División Uruguay.
