= Ministry of Presidency, Civil Service and Justice =

- Consellería de Presidencia, Administracións Públicas e Xustiza

Agency overview
- Formed: 1983
- Jurisdiction: Xunta de Galicia
- Headquarters: Santiago de Compostela
- Minister responsible: Alfonso Rueda Valenzuela, Conselleiro de Presidencia, Administracións Públicas e Xustiza
- Website: cpapx.xunta.es

The Ministry of Presidency, Civil Service and Justice (Galician: Consellería de Presidencia, Administracións Públicas e Xustiza) is a department of the Galician regional government.

The Consellería's principal role is the management of the relationship between the Xunta and the local authorities, as well as the legal system.

== Departmental roles ==
- Conselleiro: José Luis Méndez Romeu
- General Secretary: Santigo Antonio Gómez Roura
  - Dirección General de Administración Local: Matilde Begoña Rodríguez Rumbo
  - Dirección General de Calidad y Evaluacióin de las Políticas Públicas: Juan José Gómez Romero
  - Dirección General de la Función Púbica: José Rodríguez González
  - Dirección General de Interior: María Isabel Durántez Gil
  - Dirección General de Protección Civil: Esther González Saavedra
  - Dirección General de Relaciones Parlamentarias: Manuel Guillermo Varela Flores
  - Dirección General de Justicia: Julio Ignacio Iglesias Redondo

== Executive agencies ==
- Escola Galega de Administración Pública (EGAP)
- Centro de Seguridade Pública de Galicia
- Policía Autonómica de Galicia
- Instituto de Medicina Legal de Galicia (IMELGA)

== Former conselleiros ==
- Xosé Luís Barreiro Rivas (1982–1983).
- Manuel Anxo Villanueva Cendón (1986–1987)
- Pablo González Mariñas (1987–1989)
- Dositeo Rodríguez (1989–1999)
- Xaime Pita (1999–2005)
- José Luis Méndez Romeu (2005–2009)
- Alfonso Rueda (2009-)
