= Antonio Rosón =

Spanish politician

Antonio Rosón Pérez (8 June 1911 − 24 April 1986) was a Spanish politician and the first president of the pre-autonomic community of Galicia before reaching its Statute of Autonomy in 1981.

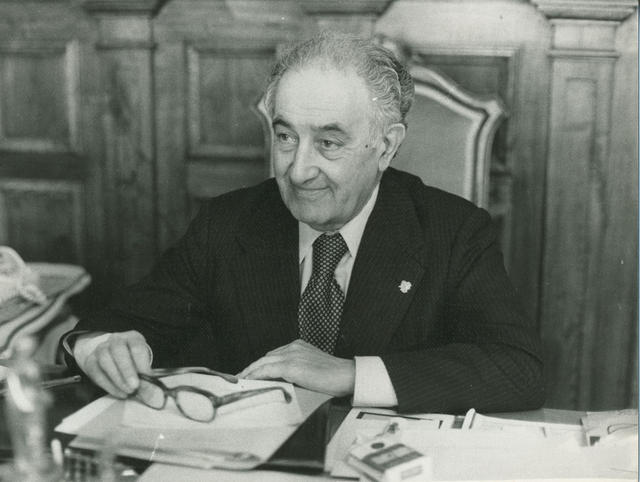
Antonio Rosón Pérez
