= Ángeles Vázquez =

Spanish politician

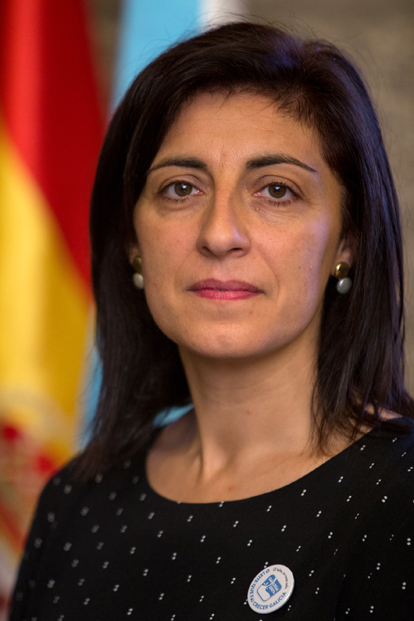

Minister of Environment and Climate Change
- Incumbent
- Assumed office 15 April 2024
- President: Alfonso Rueda
- Preceded by: Himself (as Minister for the Environment, Land and Housing)

Member of the Spanish Parliament
- In office 14 September 2010 – 27 September 2011
- Constituency: A Coruña

Mayor of Melide
- In office 2011–2015
- Preceded by: Maria Socorro
- Succeeded by: Dalia Garcia
- In office 2004–2007
- Preceded by: Miguel Pampin
- Succeeded by: Maria Socorro

Personal details
- Born: 3 April 1972 (age 54) Melide, Province of A Coruña
- Party: People's Party
- Education: University of Santiago de Compostela
- Occupation: Politician

María Ángeles Vázquez Mejuto is a Spanish politician from the People's Party of Galicia who has been serving as Galicia's Minister of Environment and Climate Change since 15 April 2024.
