= Valeriano Martínez =

Spanish politician (1961–2021)

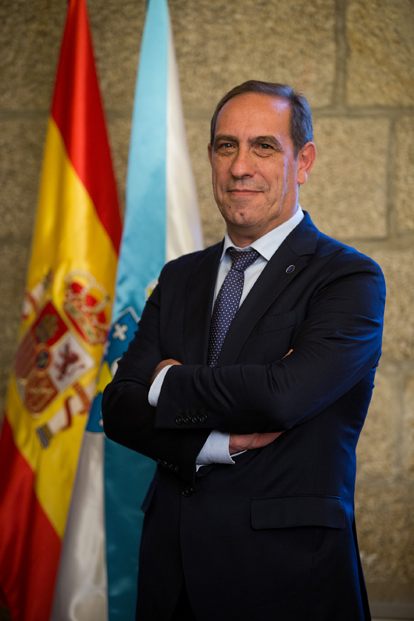
- Martínez in 2017

Minister of Finance of Galicia
- In office 9 February 2015 – 6 October 2021
- Preceded by: Helena Muñoz
- Succeeded by: Miguel Corgos

Member of the Parliament of Galicia
- In office 25 September 2016 – 29 January 2017

Personal details
- Born: 1961 Aldán, Cangas, Spain
- Died: 6 October 2021 (aged 59–60) Santiago de Compostela, Spain
- Party: PPdeG

Valeriano Martínez (1961 – 6 October 2021) was a Spanish politician. A member of the People's Party of Galicia, he served as Minister of Finance of Galicia from 2015 until 2021 and was a member of the Parliament of Galicia from 2016 to 2017.

Martínez died on 6 October 2021, at his office as a result of suffering a cardiac arrest.
