= Rosa Quintana =

Spanish civil servant and politician

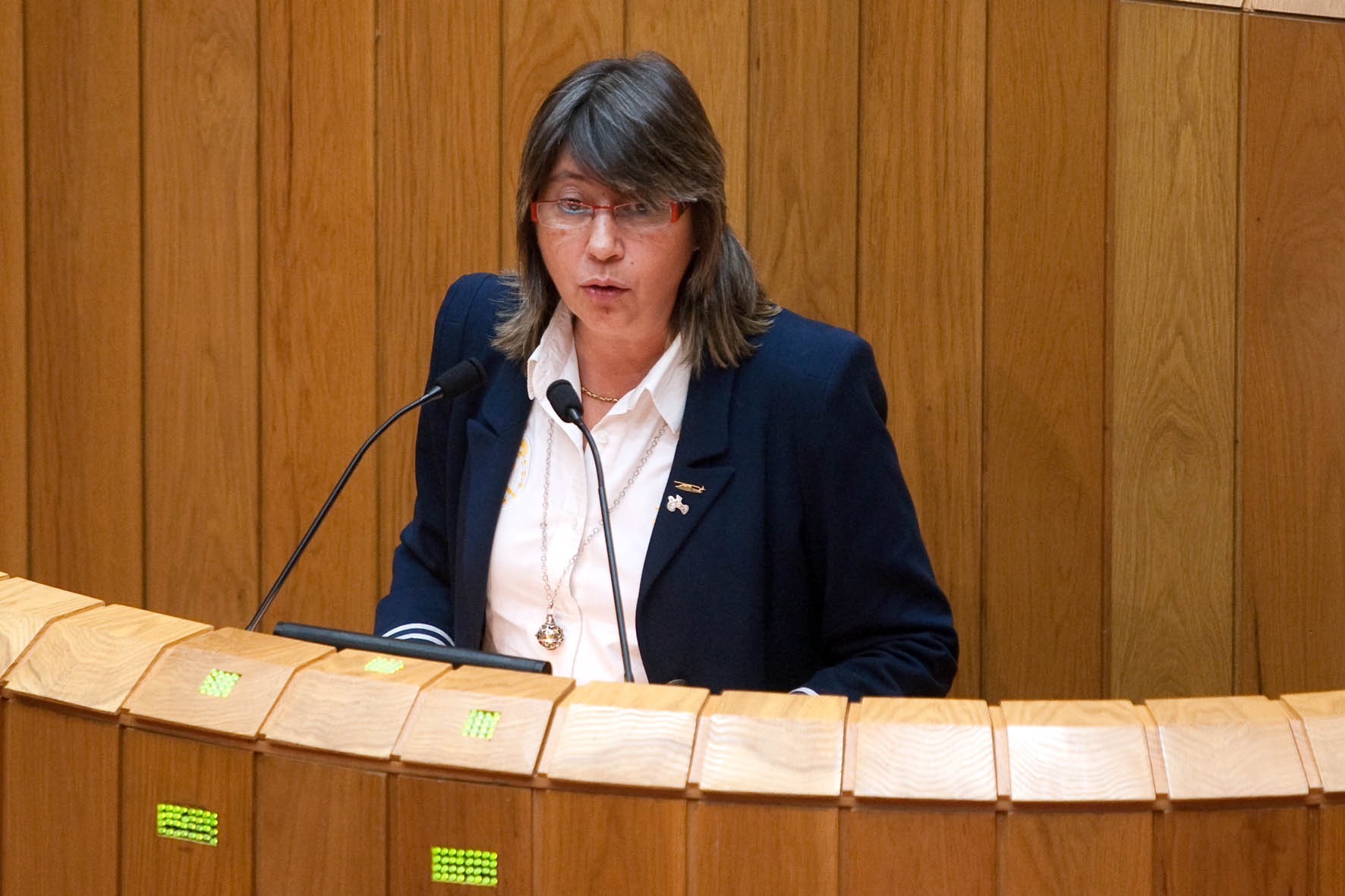

Personal details
- Born: 1959 (age 66–67)
- Education: University of Santiago de Compostela
- Occupation: politician

Rosa Quintana Carballo (born 1959) is a Spanish civil servant and politician who has been the Galician government's Minister of the Sea since 2015, serving in the equivalent predecessor posts since 2009.

== Career ==
Rosa Quintana Carballo was born in 1959. She graduated from the University of Santiago de Compostela with a degree in biological sciences and subsequently completed a doctorate in biology.

In 1987, she joined the Galician Ministry of Fisheries, Shellfish and Aquaculture, and two years later, she was promoted to head of fishing inspection. In 1992, she was appointed head of the Shellfish Service and from 1997 was Territorial Delegate in Vigo for the Ministry. In 2001, she was appointed the Ministry's Director-General of Innovation and Fishing Development.

In 2009, she became Minister for the Sea in the Galician government, a post which was reorganised in 2012 as Minister of Rural and Marine Affairs. In 2015, it was reorganised once again, and she was appointed Minister for the Sea.

She was elected to the 15th Congress of Deputies in the 2023 Spanish general election in Ourense.
