= Diego Calvo Pouso =

Spanish politician (born 1975)

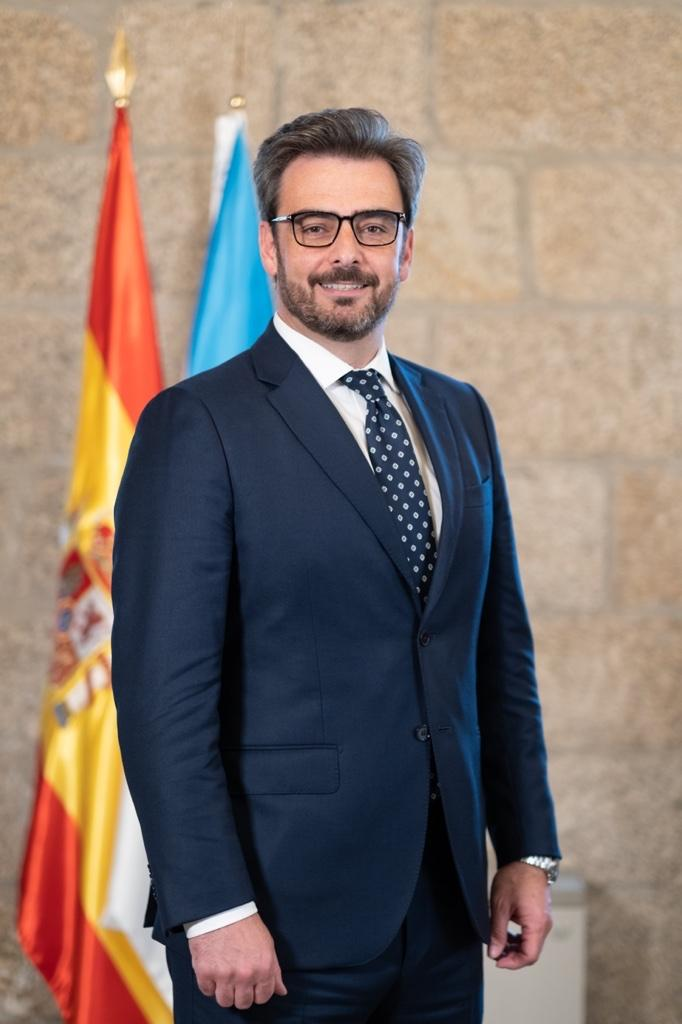
- Calvo in 2024

Minister of the Presidency, Justice and Sports of Galicia
- Incumbent
- Assumed office 15 May 2022
- President: Alfonso Rueda
- Preceded by: Alfonso Rueda

Personal details
- Born: 24 April 1975 (age 50)
- Party: People's Party

Diego Calvo Pouso (born 24 April 1975) is a Spanish politician serving as minister of the presidency, justice and sports of Galicia since 2022. From 2011 to 2015, he served as president of the provincial deputation of A Coruña.
