= Maricá, Rio de Janeiro =

Coordinates: 22°55′08″S 42°49′08″W

Maricá
- Municipality
- Município de Maricá
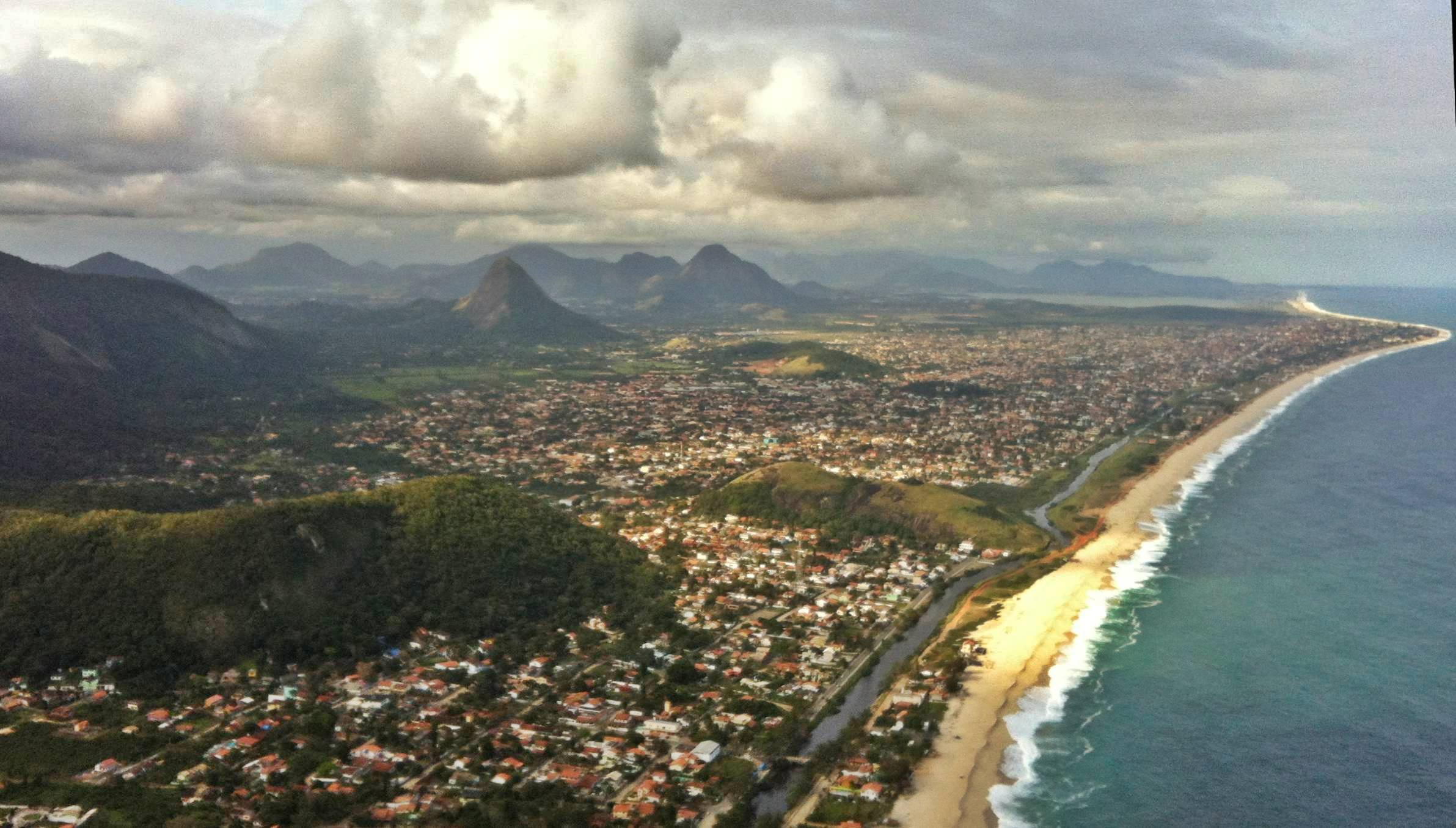
- Panoramic view

- Flag Coat of arms

- Location in the Rio de Janeiro state.
- Established: May 26, 1814

Government
  - Mayor: Fabiano Horta (2017-2020) (PT)

Area
  - Municipality: 362 km^{2} (140 sq mi)
- Elevation: 6 m (20 ft)

Population (2022 Brazilian Census)
  - Municipality: 197,277
  - Estimate (2025): 212,470
  - Density: 661.3/km^{2} (1,713/sq mi)
  - Metro: 1,795,015
- Time zone: UTC−3 (BRT)

Maricá (Portuguese pronunciation: [maɾiˈka]) is a municipality located in the Brazilian state of Rio de Janeiro. It is located in the Greater Niterói region (or Metropolitan East), bordering Itaboraí, São Gonçalo, Rio Bonito, Niterói, Saquarema and Tanguá.

The municipal territory extends over 361.572 km^{2} (139.604 sq mi) and is divided into four districts: Maricá (headquarters), Ponta Negra, Inoã and Itaipuaçu.

The municipality of Maricá is known for its rural properties – small farms and large ranches – many of which are rich in historical content.

== Geography ==
Maricá is a city of the Rio de Janeiro Metropolitan Area, located on the coast of the Atlantic Ocean and 25 miles away from the city of Rio de Janeiro.

The municipality contains part of the 2,400-hectare (5,900-acre) Serra da Tiririca State Park, created in 1991.

=== Population ===
Historical population
Year	Pop.	±%
1990	46,545	—
2000	76,737	+64.9%
2010	127,461	+66.1%
2022	197,277	+54.8%
sources: citypopulation.de and https://ftp.ibge.gov.br/Censos/Censo_Demografico_2022/Previa_da_Populacao/POP2022_Municipios.pdf and https://censo2022.ibge.gov.br/panorama/

=== Area ===
Its area is 362,571 km^{2}.

== Territorial organization ==
Maricá is administratively divided into 50 bairros (neighborhoods) and 4 distritos (districts).

1º Distrito: Centro
Araçatiba
Barra de Maricá
Camburi
Caxito
Centro
Condado de Maricá
Flamengo
Itapeba
Jacaroá
Lagarto
Marquês de Maricá
Mumbuca
Parque Nanci
Pilar
Pindobas
Ponta Grossa
Restinga de Maricá
Retiro
São José do Imbassaí
Silvado
Ubatiba
Zacarias

2º Distrito: Ponta Negra
Balneário Bambuí
Bananal
Caju
Cordeirinho
Espraiado
Guaratiba
Jaconé
Jardim Interlagos
Manoel Ribeiro
Pindobal
Ponta Negra
Vale da Figueira

3º Distrito: Inoã
Calaboca
Cassorotiba
Chácaras de Inoã
Inoã
Santa Paula
Spar

4º Distrito: Itaipuaçu
Barroco
Cajueiros
Itaocaia Valley
Jardim Atlântico Central
Jardim Atlântico Leste
Jardim Atlântico Oeste
Morada das Águias
Praia de Itaipuaçu
Recanto de Itaipuaçu
Rincão Mimoso

== Transportation ==
Maricá has a system of 49 free bus lines that are run by the municipal government. As of 2025, these buses carry approximately 115,000 passengers per day. The municipal government also runs 25 free van lines. In addition to public transport, the municipal government also runs a free bicycle-sharing system with 63 stations.

In addition to the free bus lines run by the municipal government, there are also paid municipal and intermunicipal bus and van lines that are run by private companies. Intermunicipal van lines run from Maricá to Niterói and Rio de Janeiro. Intermunicipal buses run from Maricá to Niterói, Rio de Janeiro, São Gonçalo, Itaboraí, Nova Friburgo via Cachoeiras de Macacu, and Cabo Frio via Araruama, Iguaba Grande and São Pedro da Aldeia. Coach buses also run between Maricá and São Paulo.

Three state highways run through Maricá: RJ-102 connects Niterói to Búzios via Maricá; RJ-106 (also known as the Amaral Peixoto highway) connects São Gonçalo to Macaé via Maricá, and RJ-114 connects Maricá to Itaboraí.

The Estrada de Ferro Maricá (Maricá Railroad) arrived in Maricá in 1889 to facilitate the export of agricultural products and fish. During the following decades, it was expanded west to Niterói and east to Cabo Frio. The railroad was permanently abandoned in 1966.

The city has an airport, which does not operate regular flights, only offshore operations, known as Maricá Airport, located in the urban center.

== Economy ==
Maricá has received many royalties from the Brazilian energy company Petrobras because of the Santos Basin oil field.

== Climate ==
Climate data for Maricá, Rio de Janeiro (1981–2010)
Month	Jan	Feb	Mar	Apr	May	Jun	Jul	Aug	Sep	Oct	Nov	Dec	Year
Mean daily maximum °C (°F)	31.1 (88.0)	31.6 (88.9)	30.3 (86.5)	28.9 (84.0)	26.8 (80.2)	26.2 (79.2)	25.7 (78.3)	26.0 (78.8)	26.3 (79.3)	27.2 (81.0)	28.5 (83.3)	29.9 (85.8)	28.2 (82.8)
Daily mean °C (°F)	26.5 (79.7)	27.0 (80.6)	25.9 (78.6)	24.2 (75.6)	21.9 (71.4)	20.7 (69.3)	20.5 (68.9)	20.9 (69.6)	21.9 (71.4)	23.0 (73.4)	24.3 (75.7)	25.6 (78.1)	23.5 (74.3)
Mean daily minimum °C (°F)	22.4 (72.3)	22.5 (72.5)	21.8 (71.2)	20.3 (68.5)	17.9 (64.2)	16.3 (61.3)	15.8 (60.4)	16.2 (61.2)	17.5 (63.5)	19.1 (66.4)	20.4 (68.7)	21.6 (70.9)	19.3 (66.7)
Average precipitation mm (inches)	147.4 (5.80)	103.4 (4.07)	134.2 (5.28)	80.5 (3.17)	105.7 (4.16)	78.9 (3.11)	83.8 (3.30)	66.7 (2.63)	88.5 (3.48)	105.9 (4.17)	136.3 (5.37)	146.2 (5.76)	1,277.5 (50.30)
Average precipitation days (≥ 1.0 mm)	10	7	9	6	8	6	6	5	8	9	10	10	94
Average relative humidity (%)	79.9	77.2	80.4	82.6	82.3	81.9	80.6	79.5	80.0	81.4	80.8	81.1	80.6
Mean monthly sunshine hours	208.5	221.2	204.8	206.9	184.5	194.0	193.3	200.5	160.6	168.4	166.5	189.2	2,298.4
Source: Instituto Nacional de Meteorologia
