= Francisco Conde =

Spanish politician (born 1968)

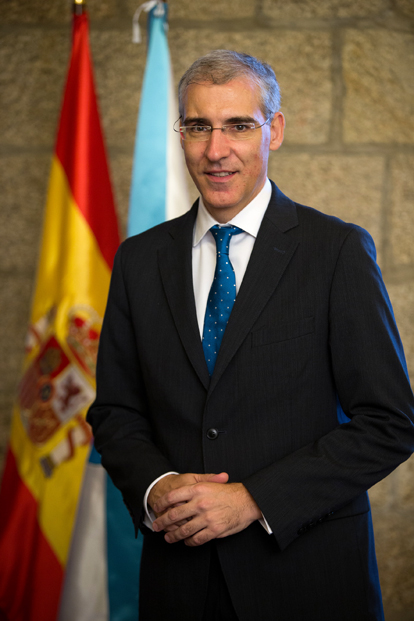
- Conde in 2017

Member of the Congress of Deputies
- Incumbent
- Assumed office 17 August 2023
- Constituency: Lugo

Personal details
- Born: 15 February 1968 (age 58)
- Party: People's Party

Francisco José Conde López (born 15 February 1968) is a Spanish politician serving as a member of the Congress of Deputies since 2023. He has served as chairman of the defence committee since 2025.
