= Alfonso Rueda =

Spanish politician (born 1968)

The Most Excellent Alfonso Rueda
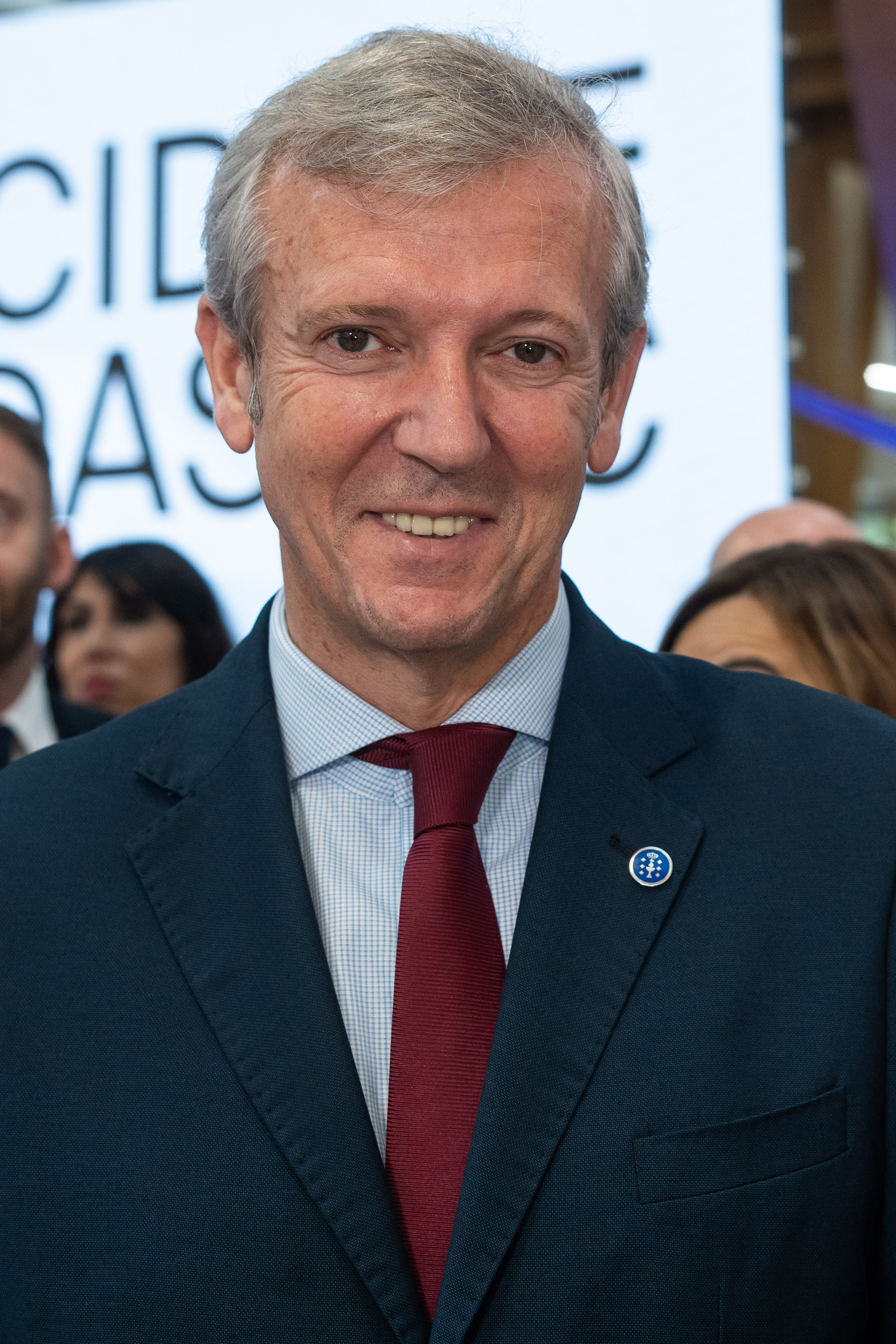

President of the Regional Government of Galicia
- Incumbent
- Assumed office 14 May 2022
- Vice President: Francisco Conde; Diego Calvo
- Preceded by: Alberto Núñez Feijóo

First Vice President of Galicia
- In office 3 December 2012 – 14 May 2022
- President: Alberto Núñez Feijóo
- Preceded by: Anxo Quintana
- Succeeded by: Francisco Conde

Member of the Parliament of Galicia
- Incumbent
- Assumed office 1 April 2009
- Constituency: Pontevedra

Personal details
- Born: 8 July 1968 (age 58) Pontevedra, Spain
- Party: People's Party of Galicia
- Spouse: Marta Coloret
- Children: 2

Alfonso Rueda Valenzuela (born 8 July 1968) is a Spanish People's Party (PP) politician. Elected to the Parliament of Galicia in 2009, he succeeded Alberto Núñez Feijóo as president of the People's Party of Galicia (PPdeG) and President of the Regional Government of Galicia in 2022. In the 2024 election, he led the party to another absolute majority.

== Biography ==
Born in Pontevedra, Rueda is the son of Antonio Rueda Crespo, a People's Alliance councillor in the city. He graduated in law from the University of Santiago de Compostela, and joined the New Generations of the People's Party in 1993.

From 2000 to 2005, Rueda was Director General of Local Administration in the government of Manuel Fraga, and also served as minister of Public Administration and Justice. He was appointed secretary general of the People's Party of Galicia (PPdeG) by its president Alberto Núñez Feijóo in 2006. In 2009, having been elected to the Parliament of Galicia by the Pontevedra constituency, he became an advisor to President of Galicia Feijóo, becoming vice president three years later. He took 97.14% of the votes in March 2016 to succeed Rafael Louzán as president of the PPdeG in the Province of Pontevedra.

In 2022, Feijóo announced his departure to be the PP's national leader. Rueda was the sole candidate to replace him as leader of the PPdeG in April, and he was elected by the Parliament to replace him as regional president in May. He formed a government, with the only difference from its predecessor being Diego Calvo as second vice president. He won the following Galician elections with 40 seats, losing two, and another absolute majority.

== Political views ==
In 2009, while secretary general of the PPdeG, Rueda attended a march by Galicia Bilingüe, an organisation that believes that the Galician language is imposed upon the Spanish-speaking residents of the region. In 2022, after being installed as president, he was criticised for this attendance by leader of the opposition Ana Pontón; he defended himself by saying that the event was to uphold the bilingual status of the region.

== Personal life ==
Rueda is the father of two daughters. He takes part in long-distance running and cycling, and is a fan of RC Celta de Vigo.
