= President of the Regional Government of Galicia =

Head of government of Galicia

- Presidente da Xunta de Galicia
- Coat of arms of Galicia

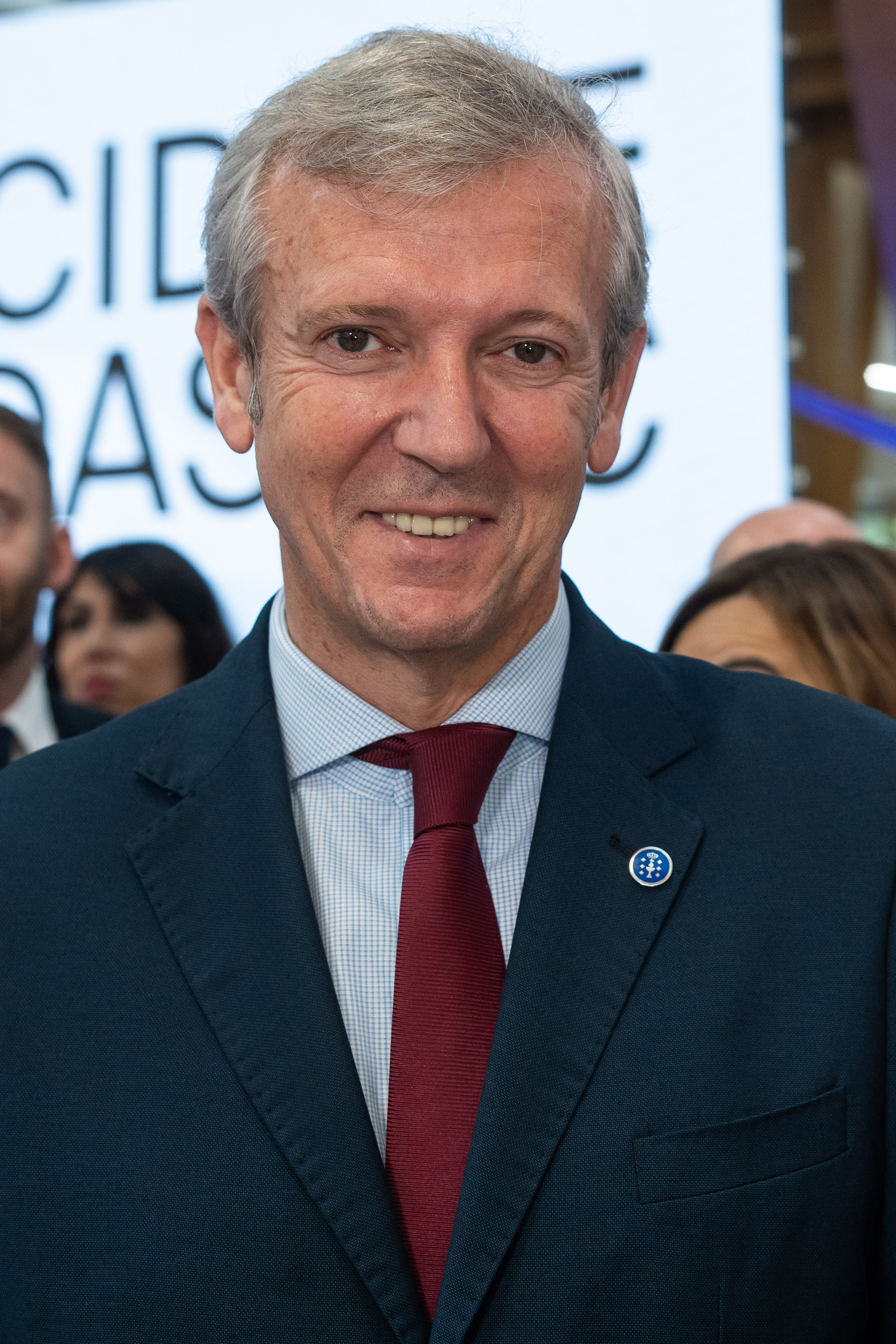
- Incumbent; Alfonso Rueda since 13 May 2022
- Style: Excelentísimo Señor
- Residence: Monte Pío
- Nominator: Parliament of Galicia
- Appointer: The Monarch countersigned by the Prime Minister
- Term length: Four years
- Inaugural holder: Xerardo Fernández Albor
- Formation: Galician Statute of Autonomy; 6 April 1981
- Website: www.presidente.gal

The president of the Regional Government of Galicia (Galician: Presidente da Xunta de Galicia, Spanish: Presidente de la Xunta de Galicia), is the head of government of Galicia. The president leads the executive branch of the regional government.

The current office is established under the Galician Statute of Autonomy. It is occupied by Alfonso Rueda.

== See also ==
- List of presidents of the Regional Government of Galicia
- Politics of Galicia
- Xunta de Galicia
