= Chay (footballer) =

Brazilian footballer (born 1990)

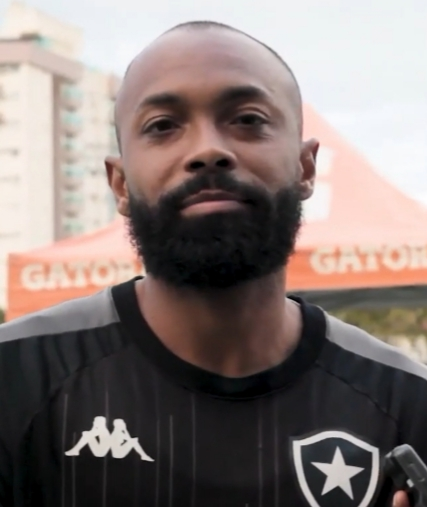
- Chay in 2021

Personal information
- Full name: Chayene Medeiros Oliveira Santos
- Date of birth: 29 September 1990 (age 36)
- Place of birth: Maceió, Brazil
- Height: 1.77 m (5 ft 10 in)
- Position: Attacking midfielder

Team information
- Current team: Niteroiense
- Number: 14

Youth career
- ??: Bela Vista
- 2008–2009: Bonsucesso

Senior career*
Years	Team	Apps	(Gls)
2008	Canto do Rio	13	(2)
2009	Songkhla		
2010–2011	Muangthong United		
2010	→ Buriram (loan)		
2011	→ Songkhla (loan)	?	(17)
2012	Esan United		
2013	Kedah FA		
2017	Bela Vista	6	(4)
2018	Mogi Mirim	9	(0)
2018	São Gonçalo EC	18	(6)
2019	Rio Branco-AC	10	(6)
2019	America-RJ	19	(3)
2020–2021	Portuguesa-RJ	36	(10)
2021	→ Botafogo (loan)	18	(8)
2021–2024	Botafogo	30	(0)
2022	→ Cruzeiro (loan)	6	(0)
2023	→ Ceará (loan)	28	(2)
2024	→ Guarani (loan)	10	(0)
2024	→ CRB (loan)	14	(0)
2025	Volta Redonda	22	(0)
2026	Portuguesa-RJ	8	(1)
2026-	Niteroiense	0	(0)
- * Club domestic league appearances and goals as of 20 August 2026

Chayene Medeiros Oliveira Santos (born 29 September 1990), commonly known as Chay, is a Brazilian footballer who plays as an attacking midfielder for Niteroiense.

== Early life ==
Named after the character from the Sergio Leone spaghetti western Once Upon a Time in the West, Chay was born in Maceió, Alagoas, and moved to Niterói, Rio de Janeiro at the age of 4. Upon arriving at the new city, he started a treatment for a number of allergies, and started in futsal after a recommendation from a doctor.

== Club career ==
Chay began his senior career with Canto do Rio in 2008, playing in the Campeonato Carioca Série C, before joining Bonsucesso, where he featured mainly for the under-20 side. He then moved abroad to Thailand in 2009, where he notably scored 17 goals in the 2011 Thai Division 1 League for Songkhla.

In late 2011, back to Brazil during a holiday period, Chay was hit by a stray bullet. In 2013, Chay switched to Malaysia and signed for Kedah FA, but was allegedly "unsettled" at the club; he later returned to his home country and started to play seven-a-side football, featuring for the likes of Fluminense, Flamengo and Botafogo. In 2018, he was called up to the Brazil seven-a-side national team, winning the Copa América de Seleções and being named the best seven-a-side player in South America.

Chay also returned to association football in 2017, with Bela Vista. On 15 January 2018, he moved to Mogi Mirim, but left the club after nine goalless appearances and signed for São Gonçalo EC on 22 May.

On 16 January 2019, Chay was announced as new signing of Rio Branco-AC. He returned to the Rio de Janeiro state on 23 April, after agreeing to a contract with America-RJ.

Chay moved to Portuguesa-RJ for the 2020 season, being a regular starter in the club's Campeonato Carioca and Série D campaigns. He was a spotlight in the 2021 Carioca after scoring five times in only thirteen matches.

On 25 May 2021, Chay was announced at Série B side Botafogo, He continued on loan until the end of the year. On 31 August, after scoring eight goals, he signed a permanent deal with the club until 2024; Portuguesa retained 50% of his economic rights. During his time at Botafogo a fan wrote a song called "Eu vi o Chay", a parody of "I Will Survive", comparing Chay to legends of football such as Thierry Henry, Ronaldo, Messi, and others.

== Career statistics ==
As of 22 November 2024

Club	Season	League			State League		Cup		Continental		Other		Total	
Club	Season	Division	Apps	Goals	Apps	Goals	Apps	Goals	Apps	Goals	Apps	Goals	Apps	Goals
Canto do Rio	2008	Carioca Série C	—		13	2	—		—		—		13	2
Bela Vista	2017	Carioca Série B2	—		6	4	—		—		—		6	4
Mogi Mirim	2018	Paulista A3	—		9	0	—		—		—		9	0
São Gonçalo EC	2018	Carioca Série B1	—		18	6	—		—		5 (Note: Appearance(s) in Copa Rio)	2	23	8
Rio Branco-AC	2019	Série D	0	0	10	6	1	0	—		—		11	6
America-RJ	2019	Carioca Série B1	—		19	3	—		—		1	0	20	3
Portuguesa-RJ	2020	Série D	8	1	15	4	—		—		—		23	5
Portuguesa-RJ	2021	Série D	0	0	13	5	—		—		—		13	5
Portuguesa-RJ	Subtotal		8	1	28	9	—		—		—		36	10
Botafogo	2021	Série B	31	8	—		—		—		—		31	8
Botafogo	2022	Série A	12	0	5	0	2	0	—		—		19	0
Botafogo	Subtotal		43	8	5	0	2	0	—		—		50	8
Cruzeiro (loan)	2022	Série B	6	0	—		—		—		—		6	0
Ceará (loan)	2023	Série B	22	2	6	0	0	0	—		8 (Note: Appearance(s) in Copa do Nordeste)	0	36	2
Guarani (loan)	2024	Série B	4	0	6	0	—		—		—		10	2
CRB (loan)	2024	Série B	14	0	—		2	0	—		—		16	2
Career total			97	11	120	30	5	0	0	0	14	2	235	43

== Honours ==
Botafogo

- Campeonato Brasileiro Série B: 2021

Cruzeiro

- Campeonato Brasileiro Série B: 2022

Ceará

- Copa do Nordeste: 2023
