= Célio Junior =

Brasil footballer (born 1986)

Personal information
- Full name: Célio da Conceição Junior
- Date of birth: June 30, 1986 (age 40)
- Place of birth: São Gonçalo, Brazil
- Height: 1.76 m (5 ft 9 in)
- Position: Central midfielder

Team information
- Current team: aposentado

Youth career
- 2003–2005: Flamengo

Senior career*
Years	Team	Apps	(Gls)
2005–2008	Flamengo	2	(0)
2006	→ Goytacaz (loan)	?	(?)
2007	→ Cardoso Moreira (loan)	?	(?)
2008	→ America (RJ) (loan)	?	(?)
2008	→ Portuguesa (RJ) (loan)	?	(?)
2009	Eupen	?	(?)
2010	América (MG)	?	(?)
2011	Tombense	?	(?)
2011	Valeriodoce	?	(?)
2012	NK Karlovac		
- * Club domestic league appearances and goals

Célio da Conceição Junior (born June 30, 1986), or simply Célio Junior, is a Brazilian central midfielder. He currently plays for NK Karlovac.

== Honours ==
Flamengo

- Copa do Brasil: 2006

== Contract ==
- Flamengo 1 December 2005 to 31 December 2008.
