= CAAC Brasil =

CAAC Brazil
- Full name: Centro Administrativo Apologético Cristão do Brasil Futebol Clube
- Founded: 22 December 2009 (15 years ago)
- President: Ricardo Moyses Coelho
- League: Série C
Home colours	Away colours

Centro Administrativo Apologético Cristão do Brasil Futebol Clube, better known as CAAC Brasil, is a sports association in the city of Rio de Janeiro. Founded on 22 December 2009, The club was approved by FERJ on 23 May 2017.

== History ==
In June 2009, at Rua dos Invalides, 120, room 201, in downtown Rio de Janeiro, the Copa CAAC Brasil 2009 Sports Project was created. The denomination derives from the Christian Apologetic Administrative Center of Brazil, a non-profit institution of an administrative, social and spiritual nature that aims to legalize and structure churches in the state. After the end of the competition, the club was created and affiliated to FFERJ and CBF on 6 January 2010.

The team starts to compete in the championships of basic category in the Amateur of the Capital of the Federation and finally joins the professional staff of the entity on 23 May 2017. The following year debuts in the State Championship of The C Series of Rio de Janeiro, the Fourth Division.

The club goes through several training centers such as Bom Pastor, Belford Roxo, Coqueiros Futebol Clube, São João de Meriti, Aterro do Flamengo, Colégio Futebol Clube and is currently based at Sport Club Anchieta.

In 2018, the club competes in its first professional competition, the Campeonato Carioca da Série B2 2018. Its first professional game was in August 2018, losing 1–0 to Canto do Rio.

== Titles ==
- Amateur Runner-up of the Capital, u-17 - 2014;
- Amateur Runner-up of the Capital, u-17 - 2015;
- State League Champion, under-17 - 2015;
- Runner-up of the Capital Amateur Cup, u-16 - 2016;
- Amateur Runner-up of the Capital, u-17, 2017;
