= Carlos Maia =

Brazilian footballer (born 2001)

Personal information
- Full name: Carlos Eduardo Maia do Nascimento
- Date of birth: 2 May 2001 (age 25)
- Place of birth: Cabo de Santo Agostinho, Brazil
- Height: 1.87 m (6 ft 2 in)
- Position: Midfielder

Team information
- Current team: Paysandu

Youth career
- EC Resende
- 2019: Madureira
- 2020–2022: Perilima
- 2021: → Grêmio (loan)

Senior career*
Years	Team	Apps	(Gls)
2018	EC Resende	1	(0)
2020–2022	Perilima	8	(0)
2022	→ Campinense (loan)	8	(1)
2023	Goiás	6	(0)
2023–	Monsoon	4	(0)
2024	→ Castanhal (loan)	7	(1)
2024–	→ Paysandu (loan)	0	(0)
- * Club domestic league appearances and goals as of 14:52, 8 March 2024 (UTC)

Carlos Eduardo Maia do Nascimento (born 2 May 2001), known as Carlos Maia, is a Brazilian footballer who plays as a midfielder for Paysandu.

== Club career ==
Born in Cabo de Santo Agostinho, Pernambuco, Carlos Maia made his senior debut with EC Resende in the 2018 Campeonato Carioca Série C. He subsequently signed for Madureira, playing for their under-20 side before moving to Perilima.

Carlos Maia played for Perilima's first team in the 2020 Campeonato Paraibano, before agreeing to a loan deal with Grêmio on 18 December of that year; he was assigned to the under-20s. After featuring rarely, he returned to Perilima in December 2021, but was loaned to Campinense in February 2022.

Carlos Maia scored his first senior goal on 16 July 2022, netting his side's second in a 2–0 Série C home win over Ferroviário. On 13 December, he signed for Série A side Goiás.

== Career statistics ==
As of 5 February 2024

Club	Season	League			State League		Cup		Continental		Other		Total	
Club	Season	Division	Apps	Goals	Apps	Goals	Apps	Goals	Apps	Goals	Apps	Goals	Apps	Goals
EC Resende	2018	Carioca Série C	—		1	0	—		—		—		1	0
Perilima	2020	Paraibano	—		8	0	—		—		—		8	0
Campinense (loan)	2022	Série C	6	1	2	0	0	0	—		2 (Note: Appearance(s) in Copa do Nordeste)	0	10	1
Goiás	2023	Série A	0	0	6	0	0	0	0	0	1 (Note: Appearance(s) in Copa Verde)	0	7	0
Monsoon	2023	Gaúcho Série A2	—		4	0	—		—		10 (Note: Appearance(s) in Copa FGF)	0	14	0
Castanhal	2024	Paraense	—		7	1	—		—		—		7	1
Paysandu	2024	Série B	0	0	—		—		—		0	0	0	0
Career total			6	1	28	1	0	0	0	0	13	0	47	2

== Honours ==
Campinense

- Campeonato Paraibano: 2022
