= Niteroiense FC =

Football club from Niterói, Rio de Janeiro, Brazil

Niteroiense
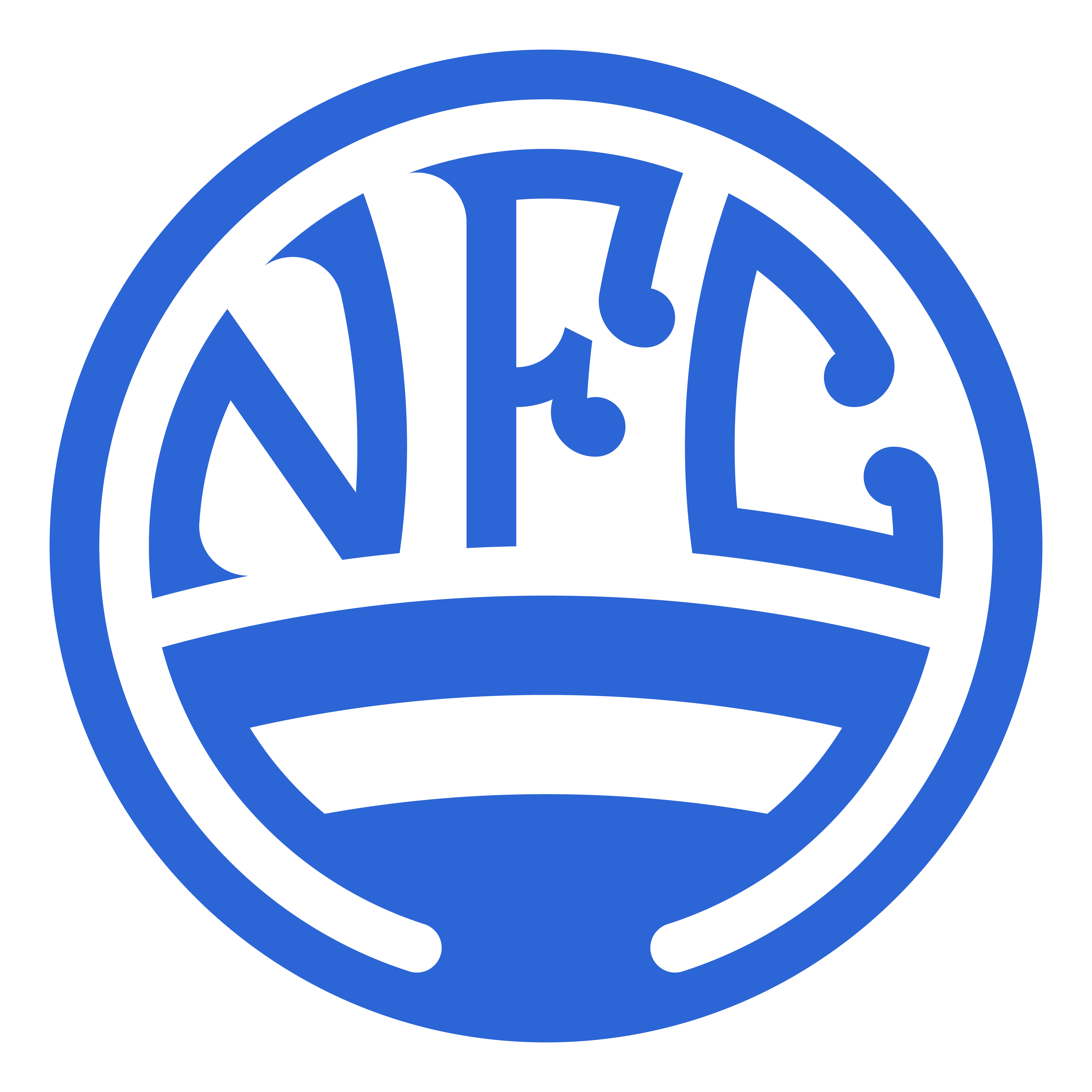
- Full name: Niteroiense Futebol Clube
- Nicknames: Niterói; Nikiti; Arariboia; Nitera
- Founded: May 11, 1913; 113 years ago
- Ground: Arena Trops
- Capacity: 1,541
- President: André Luiz Silva
- Head coach: Thiago Thomaz
- League: Campeonato Carioca Série B1
- 2025: Carioca Série B1, 6th of 12
- Website: niteroiensefc.com.br
Home colors	Away colors	Third colors

Niteroiense Futebol Clube (Brazilian Portuguese: [niteˈɾɔjˈẽsi futʃiˈbɔw ˈklubi]; lit. 'Niteroiense Football Club'), more commonly referred to as simply Niteroiense, is a Brazilian football club based in the city of Niterói, in the state of Rio de Janeiro. The club was originally founded on May 11, 1913, as Nictheroyense Football Club, and played an important role in the early development of football in the region. After ceasing its activities in 1981, the club was re-founded in 2024 through the transfer of the affiliation of Clube Atlético Carioca, marking the return of Niterói to professional football.

Among its main achievements are the Campeonato Fluminense of 1918, the main competition in the state of Rio de Janeiro at the time, and the 2024 Campeonato Carioca Série C. Its colors are blue and white. It plays its home matches at Arena Trops, which has a capacity of 1,541 spectators. It currently competes in the Campeonato Carioca Série B1.

== History ==
=== Foundation and first titles (1913–1924) ===
Nictheroyense Football Club was established in May 11, 1913 during a period of sporting growth in the city of Niterói, which saw the founding of numerous football clubs. The club was founded by Alberto Calado, Gastão Ramos, Alipio José dos Santos, Antonio Freitas, Manoel Rocha, and Sílvio Vieira Goulart. (Note: The first board of directors of Nictheroyense was run by a governing committee, composed of Antônio de Freitas as president, Adalberto Guimarães as vice-president, Alberto Calado as treasurer, Oscar Vilela as secretary, Gastão Ramos in charge of sports, and Alipio José dos Santos as legal representative.) The club's first home ground was located on Rua Santa Clara in the neighborhood of Ponta d'Areia, an area linked to the Santa Clara and São Joaquim textile factory (founded in 1893) and the local workers' athletic club. Nictheroyense was one of the founding members of the Liga Sportiva Fluminense in 1915, organizer of the first state league in Rio de Janeiro.

With only five years of existence, the club won the 1918 Campeonato Fluminense (organized by the LSF), finishing ahead of clubs such as Barreto, Cubango, Fluminense, Guarany, Odeon, Parnahyba, and Ypiranga. During the campaign, Nictheroyense inflicted the biggest rout in its history by defeating Guarany, a rival of Santa Rosa that is now defunct, by a score of 9–0. The team that won the first title in Nictheroyense's history was composed of: Gastão Ramos, Jovelino and Adalberto; Antonico, Tavares and Samuel; Nick, Billú, Raymundo, Oscar and Zéca.

In 1919, the club moved to a new field on Rua Visconde de Sepetiba, in downtown Niterói, where it also established its social headquarters next to the pitch. In the following years, the club finished as runner-up in the Campeonato Fluminense in 1922 and 1924, both won by Byron, in addition to being crowned champion of the Torneio Início in 1923 against the same opponent.

=== Consolidation in Niterói football (1925–1950) ===
Between the 1920s and the 1950s, the club was part of the so-called "Group of Six" of Niterói football, alongside Canto do Rio, Ypiranga, Fluminense, Byron, and Barreto. This grouping represented the elite of local football during that period.

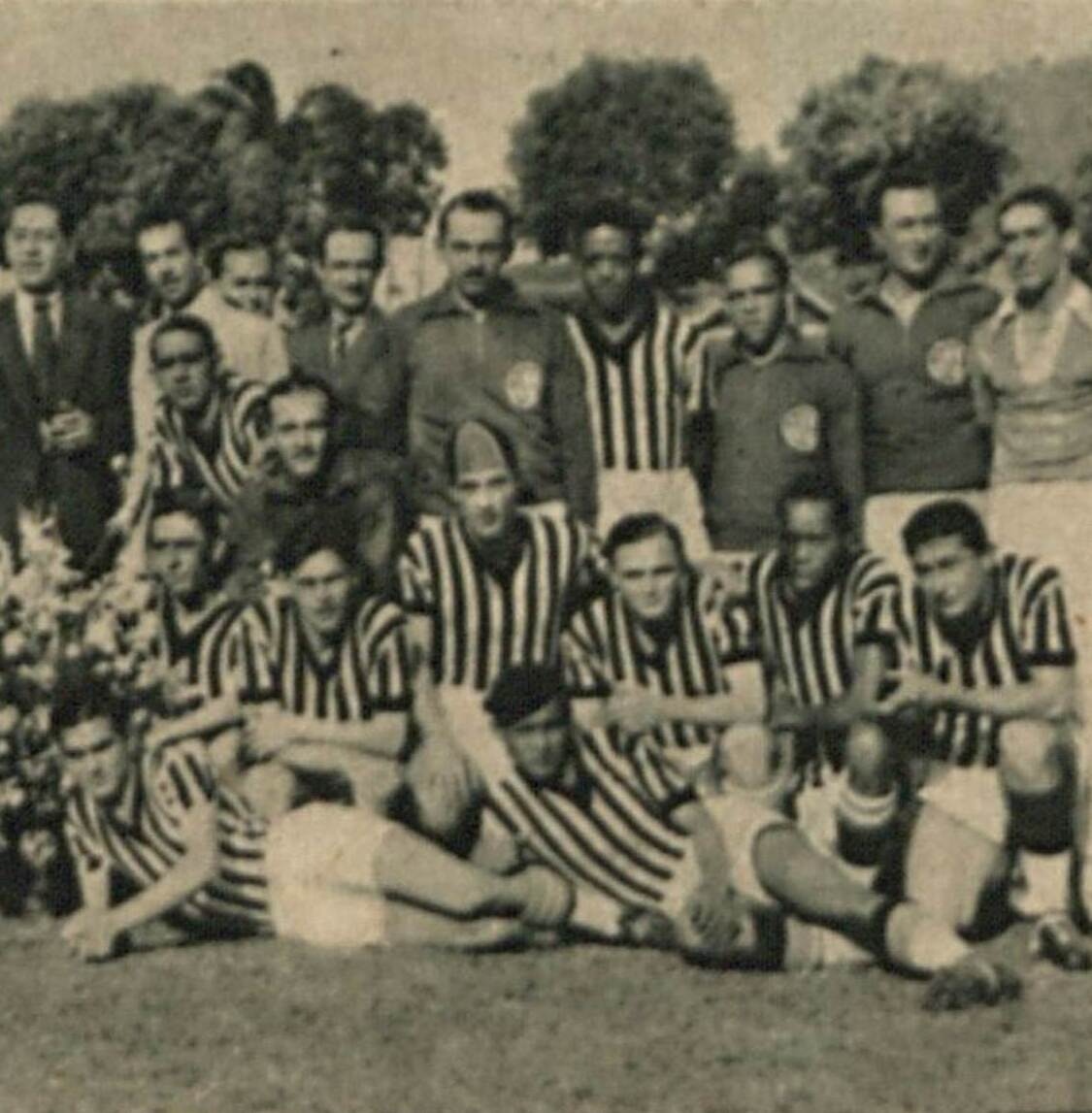
Nictheroyense players in 1937.

In 1937, it was crowned champion of the Campeonato Niteroiense, a title that was shared with Fonseca after both teams finished level in the round-robin standings. The tiebreaker was decided through a best-of-three series, in which the first match ended in a draw, the second was won by Fonseca, and the third by Nictheroyense; with parity still persisting, a final playoff match was subsequently held, ending in a 1–1 draw, which led to the division of the title.

In 1943, the club's name was updated to Niteroiense Futebol Clube, accompanied by changes to its crest, in accordance with the 1943 Portuguese Spelling Reform that altered the official spelling of the city's name from "Nictheroy" to "Niterói". In 1949, the club was recognized as a public utility.

=== Decline and end of activities (1951–1981) ===
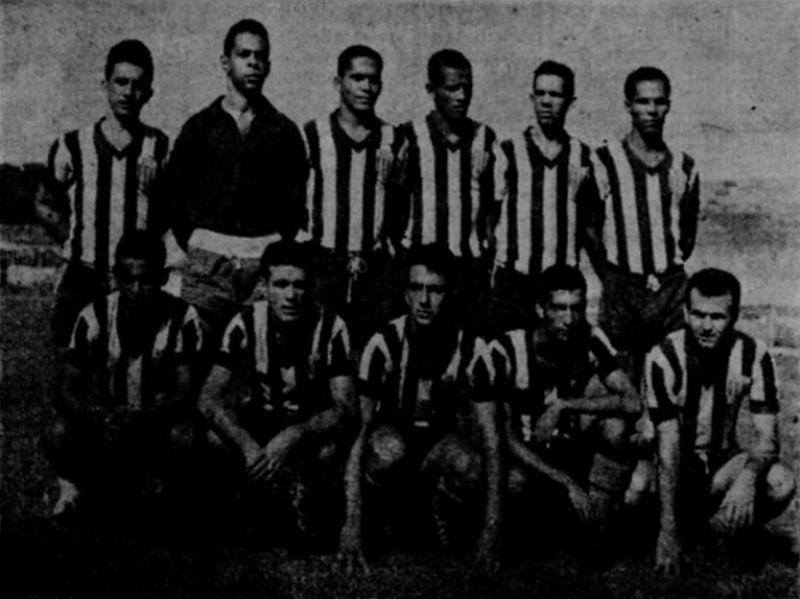
Niteroiense players in 1962.

In the following decades, Niteroiense maintained regular sporting activity, although with less competitive prominence. The process of professionalization of football and the merger of the states of Rio de Janeiro and Guanabara gradually reduced the space available to local associations, also impacting the club.

Between 1967 and 1978, the club was involved in a legal dispute over the ownership of its land, in which four religious entities claimed the area and filed an eviction lawsuit. In 1970, the adverse possession action was ruled unfounded, determining the vacating of the property. In 1978, the land was acquired by Medrado Dias, who donated the headquarters to Niteroiense, with the former football field being converted into a parking lot. In 1980, the land corresponding to the field was sold to a real estate company, and the headquarters area ended up being incorporated into the negotiations, leading to the discontinuation of its activities and the extinction of the institution in 1981. The club's last president, Dilermando Soares, donated the club's collection to Lar Humaitá.

=== Re-foundation and new phase (2024–present) ===
In 2024, Niteroiense was re-founded after more than four decades of inactivity. The club's new phase began through the transfer of the affiliation of Clube Atlético Carioca to the FERJ, which enabled the team to participate in official competitions.

The team competed in the 2024 Campeonato Carioca Série C and won the Taça Waldir Amaral with a record of eight wins and one loss, scoring 24 goals and conceding only three. In the semi-finals, the club secured promotion to the 2024 Campeonato Carioca Série B2 by defeating Campos 2–0 away in Cardoso Moreira and drawing 1–1 in the home leg played in São Cristóvão. In the finals of the Série C, against Uni Souza, Niteroiense hosted the second leg. The first match, held at Moça Bonita, ended 1–1, with Niteroiense equalizing early in the second half through Jhow Jhow, the competition's top scorer. In the return leg at the Estádio Ronaldo Nazário, Niteroiense took the lead with a penalty converted by Digregor, but Uni Souzaequalized through Mamed. With the aggregate score tied 2–2, the league was decided on penalties, where goalkeeper Marcílio saved one attempt and Niteroiense converted all their kicks to win the title.

Later that year, Niteroiense competed in the 2024 Campeonato Carioca Série B2, finishing third in the Taça Maracanã and qualifying for the semi-finals, which also earned them promotion to the 2025 Campeonato Carioca Série B1. In the semi-finals, the club defeated Bonsucesso 4–3 in the second leg, but was eliminated due to a 2–0 loss in the first match, closing the 2024 season with two promotions and two titles.

In June 2025, the club took part in the 2025 Copa Rio, in which they finally played a match in Niterói again, debuting at the Arena Trops with a 0–0 draw against America. In the second leg, held at the Estádio Giulite Coutinho, they were defeated 2–0 and eliminated in the opening stage of the tournament. In the same year, Niteroiense competed in the 2025 Campeonato Carioca Série B1. The team finished the competition in sixth place with 16 points, recording the best attack with 16 goals scored, but also the second most conceded defense, with 14 goals against. Despite a 5–1 victory in the final round, the club failed to reach the top four that advanced to the semi-finals by a margin of two points.

== Symbols ==
=== Crests ===
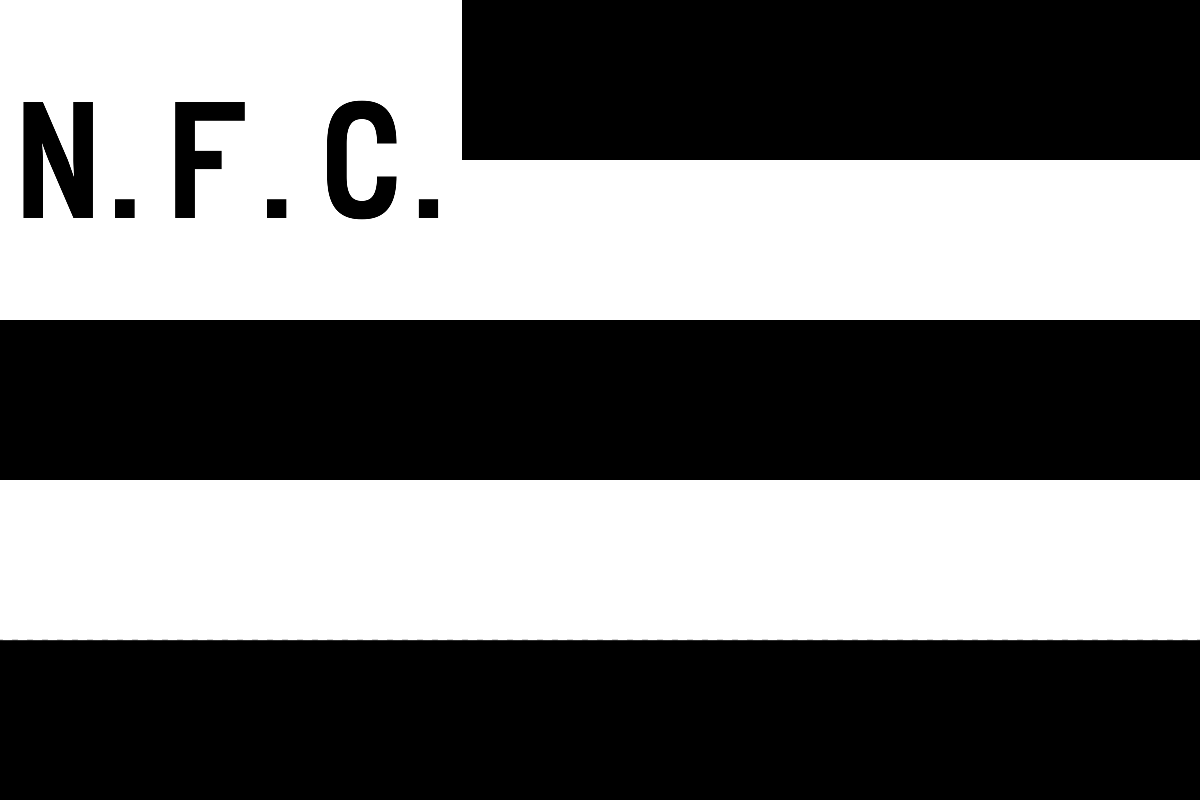
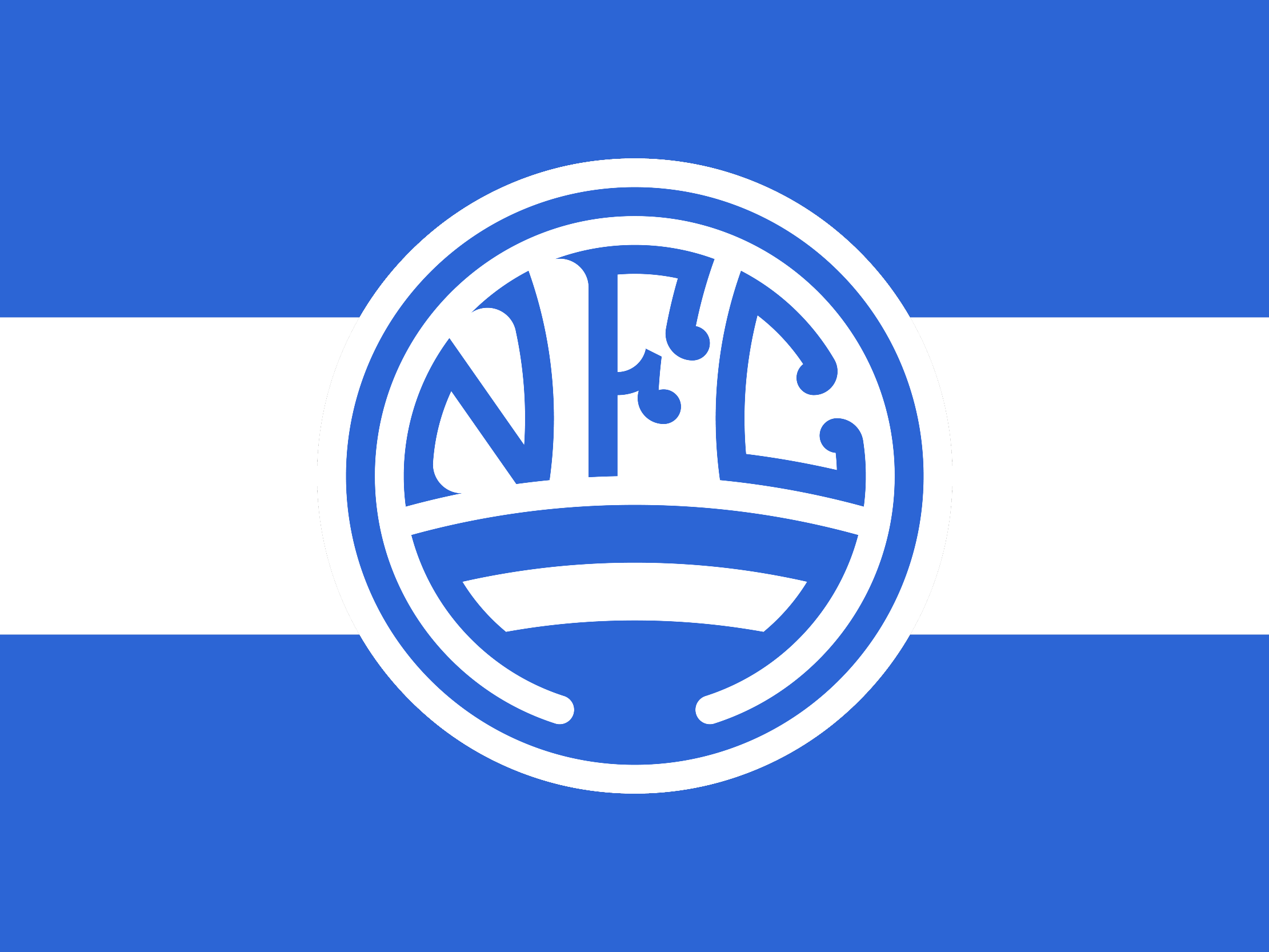
Flag of Niteroiense in 1915 (above) and currently (below).

Until 1919, Niteroiense used a crest in a Iberian-style shield format, in black and white, with three vertical stripes and the initials "N.F.C." at the top. In that year, with the merger with Caravana, a club from Ponta d'Areia, the colors blue and pink were incorporated into the side stripes of the crest, while maintaining the inscription "N.F.C." and the central black stripe. Later, in 1943, along with the change of the club's name, the crest was completely redesigned. The new model, in a French-style shield format, abandoned the white and pink colors and came to feature vertical stripes in blue, black and red, with the initials "N.F.C." highlighted over a red band at the top.

In 2024, with the re-founding of the club, Niteroiense adopted a new visual identity based on the colors blue and white in homage to the Flag of Niterói. The crest came to have a Swiss-style shield format, with predominance of blue, the club's monogram at the center and the year of foundation at the bottom. According to Maicon Vilela, refounder of the club, the reformulation aimed to revitalize the club's image and attract a younger audience, in line with the trends of the 21st century.

In March 2026, Niteroiense held, on its social media, an online public vote to choose a new crest, among four options. The winning model, circular, in blue and white, with the initials "NFC" and a representation of the Niterói Contemporary Art Museum, received 460 of the 1,017 votes (45.2%). The change was motivated by the similarity of the then-current crest to that of Atlético Carioca, a club previously associated with Vilela.

Below is the history of the crests, from the foundation to the present day:

Niteroiense Crests

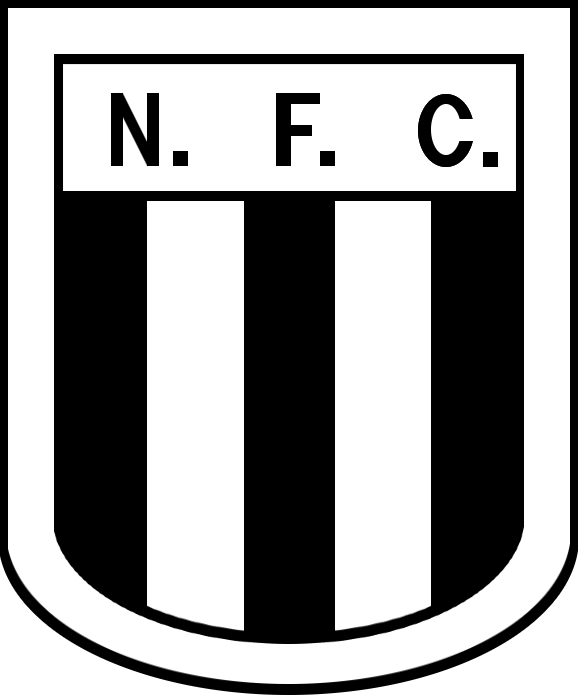
1913–1919

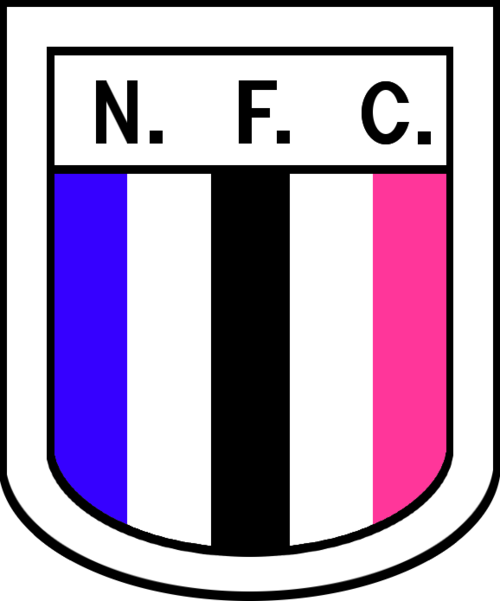
1919–1943

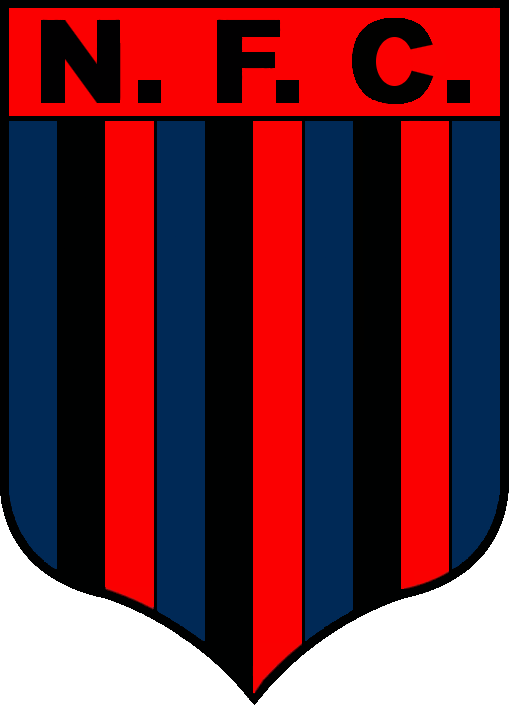
1943–1981

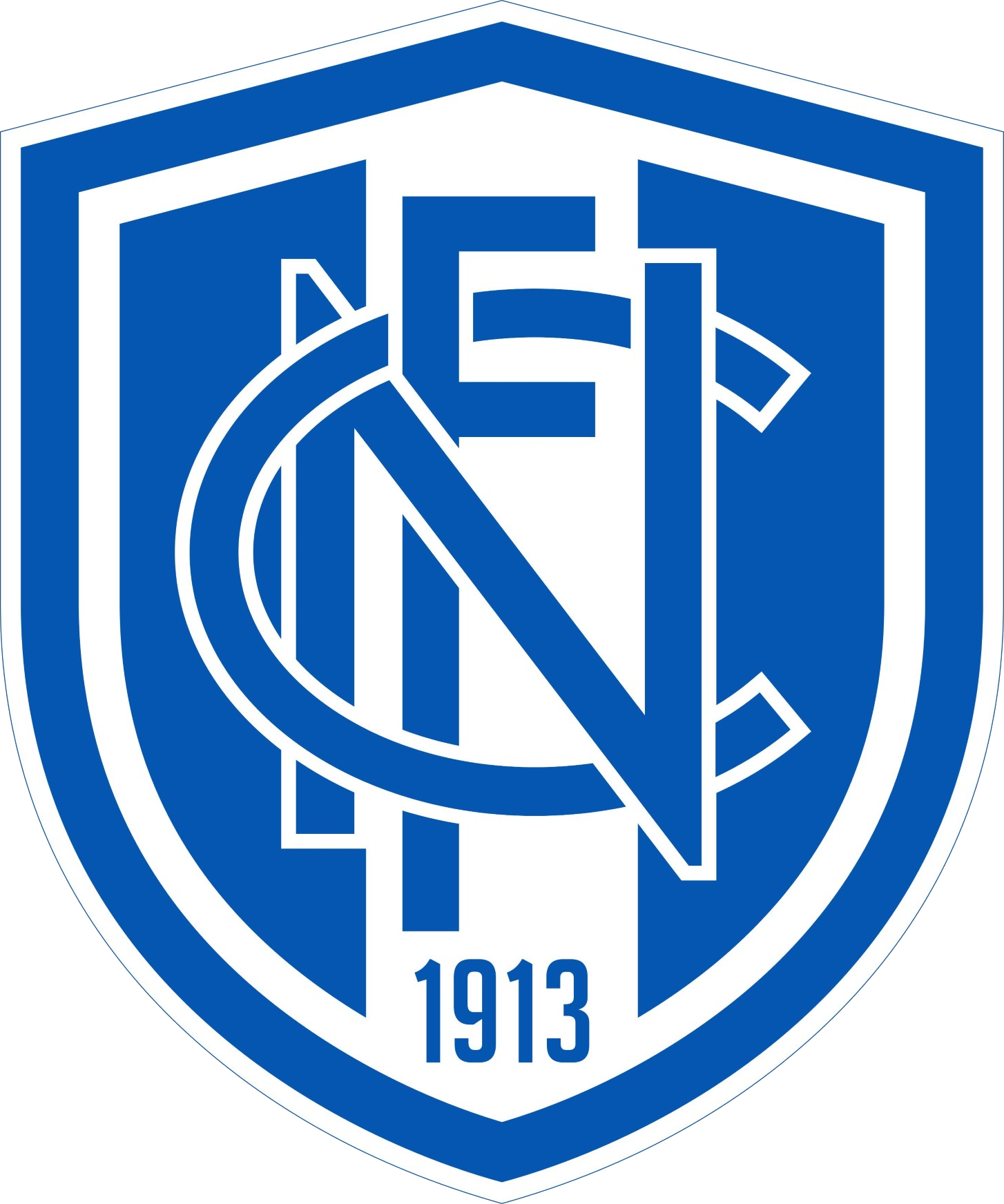
2024–2026

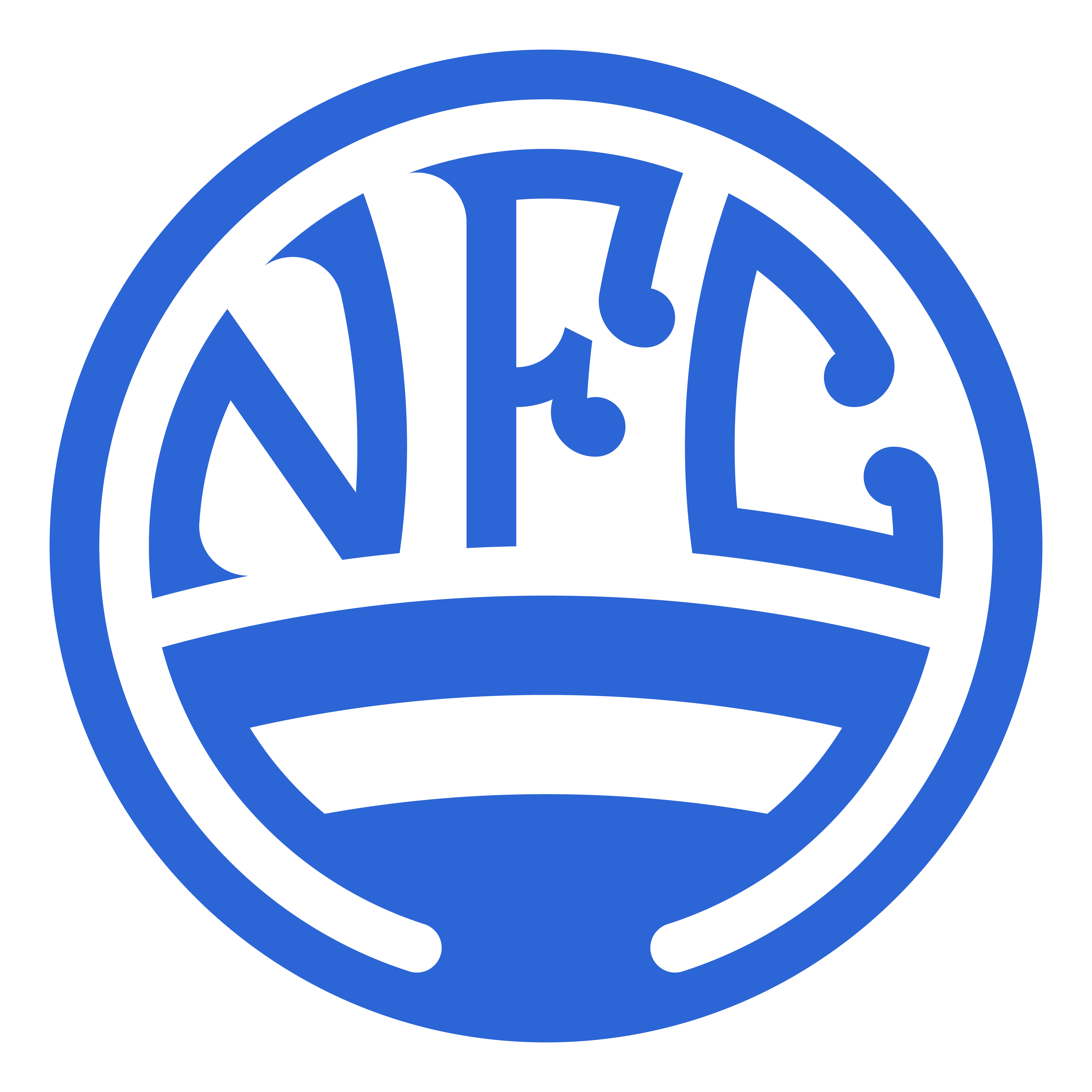
2026–present

=== Kits ===
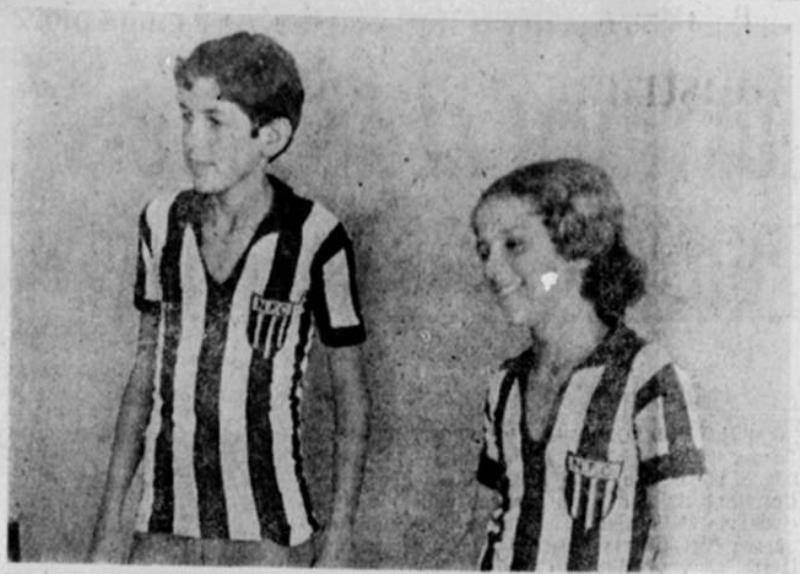
Children wearing Niteroiense jerseys in the mid-70s.

Since its founding, Niteroiense has used vertically striped kits in black and white, a pattern that remained in use throughout its history until the end of its activities in 1980. In 2024, with the club's re-foundation, the kits were updated, adopting blue and white in line with the new visual identity.

==== History of kits ====
1913	See history	2025

==== Current kits ====
===== Players =====
- Home kit: blue shirt with white stripes, blue shorts and socks;
- Away kit: white shirt and shorts with blue stripes, and white socks;
- Third kit: black shirt and socks, and black shorts with gray stripes.

Home	Away	Third

===== Goalkeepers =====
- Home kit: yellow shirt, shorts and socks;
- Away kit: gray shirt, shorts and socks;

Home	Away

=== Mascot ===
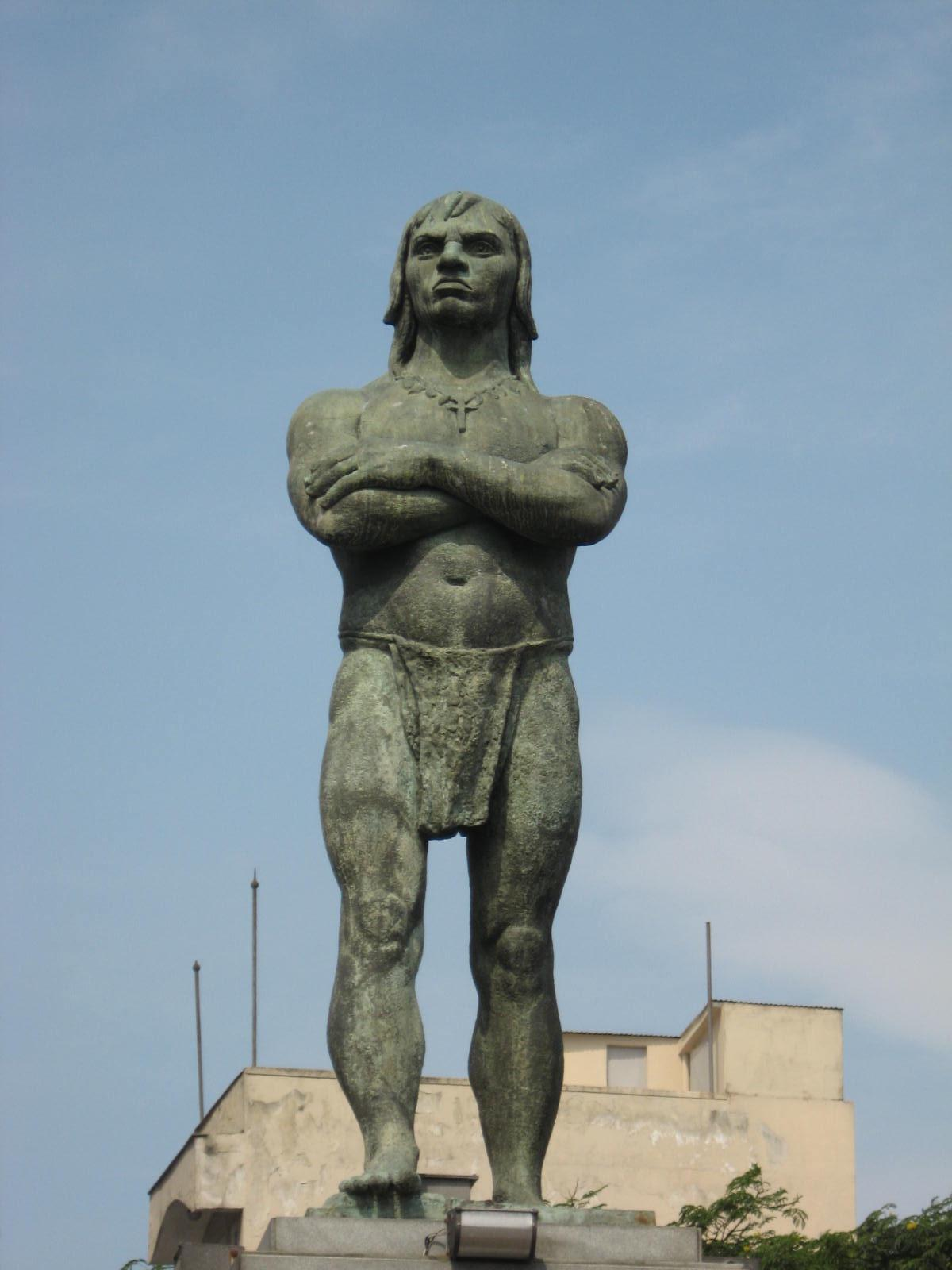
Statue of Arariboia in Niterói.

The club's mascot is the indigenous chief Arariboia, a historical and legendary figure closely tied to the identity and memory of the city of Niterói.

Arariboia was an important chief of the Temiminó people, part of the Tupi ethnic group that inhabited the coastline of present-day Brazil during the 16th century. He became known for his strategic alliance with the Portuguese, playing a decisive role in the conflict over the Guanabara Bay against the Tamoios and the French, culminating in the expulsion of the latter on January 20, 1567. In recognition of his role in the conflict, Arariboia was granted the title of Knight of the Order of Christ and a plot of land in what is now the neighborhood of São Cristóvão. He was also granted possession of lands at the entrance of the bay by the Portuguese Crown. It was there that the village of São Lourenço was established, considered the founding nucleus of the city of Niterói, of which Arariboia is widely regarded as the founder. His legacy remains one of the most significant historical markers of the region and continues to be honored through various cultural representations, including his use as the club’s official symbol.

== Facilities ==
=== Rua Santa Clara Field ===
The Rua Santa Clara Field was located in the neighborhood of Ponta d'Areia, in Niterói, and belonged to Niteroiense. Considered one of the best in the city in the early 20th century, it was often described as a "spacious ground" and attracted large crowds to matches. It hosted games of the Liga Sportiva Fluminense, of which the club was a founding member and active participant in the 1910s.

=== Former social headquarters ===
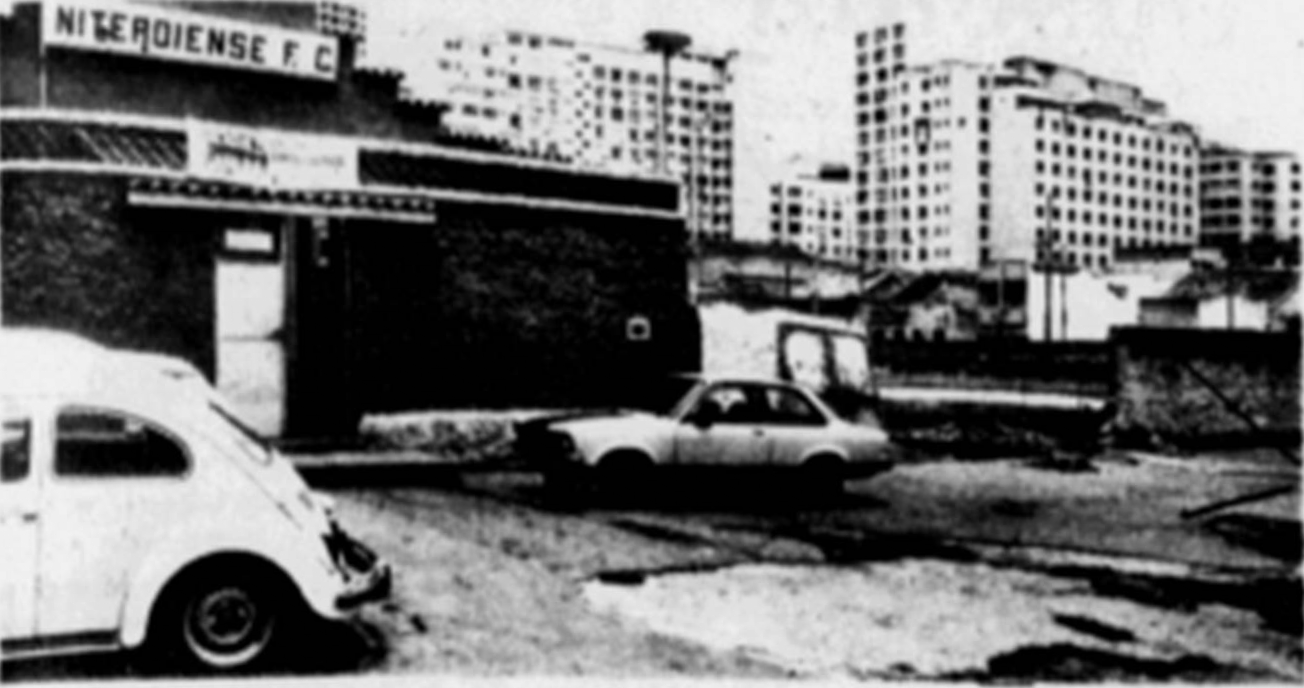
Former social headquarters of Niteroiense Futebol Clube.

The social headquarters of Niteroiense was located on Cadete Xavier Leal Street, in downtown Niterói, and was inaugurated in 1919, in the same period in which the club inaugurated the field at the corner with Visconde de Sepetiba Street. The building housed the secretariat, administrative rooms, a social hall, bar, sound system and sauna, functioning as the nucleus of the club's associative life. The venue hosted many parties and dances, attracting members and visitors over the decades. Between 1967 and 1978, the club's land became the subject of a legal dispute, which Niteroiense lost, resulting in the vacating of the property. In 1978, the land was acquired by Medrado Dias, who donated the headquarters to Niteroiense, preserving its social functions, while the land corresponding to the field remained with the purchaser. In 1980, the land corresponding to the field was sold to a real estate company, and the headquarters area ended up being incorporated into the negotiations.

=== Rua Visconde de Sepetiba field ===
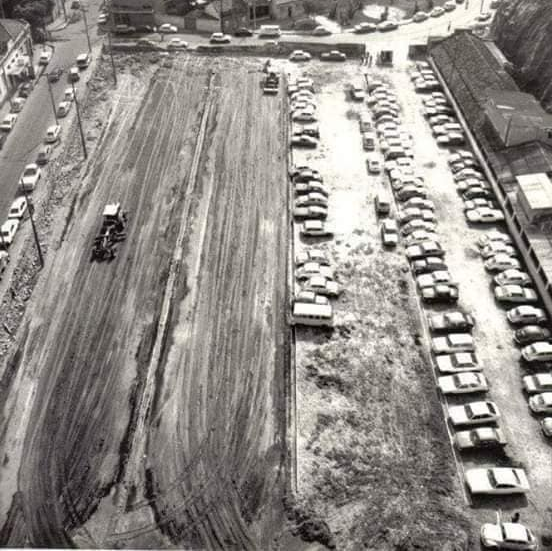
Field being used as a parking lot.

The club's main field was located on Visconde de Sepetiba Street and was inaugurated in 1919. The inaugural match, held on March 23, 1919, was against Ypiranga and ended in a 2–2 draw. The venue featured a grass pitch and stands; lighting was installed in 1930, allowing night matches to be held. The first match played under the floodlights took place on July 12, 1930, with Fluminense, from Nova Friburgo, defeating Gragoatá by 3–1. The field also hosted numerous matches between clubs from Niterói and major teams from Rio de Janeiro, including a Fla-Flu that ended 5–3 in favor of Flamengo. After the legal dispute that took place between 1967 and 1978, the club lost ownership of the field's land. The last match on the field occurred between Niteroiense and the Veterans of AABB, with a 3–1 victory for Niteroiense. In 1978 the area was converted into a parking lot and, in 1980, sold to a real estate company together with the club's headquarters.

=== Concha Acústica Sports Complex ===
The Concha Acústica Sports Complex, located in the neighborhood of São Domingos, in Niterói, is where Niteroiense trains and plays the under-20 team's home matches. The club attempted to use the place as the home ground for the professional team, but the FERJ denied authorization due to technical issues related to the venue's infrastructure, including safety, accommodations, accessibility, and other requirements for sanctioned competitions. According to president André Luiz Silva, the holding of professional matches at the venue depends on authorization from the Fire Department and the presentation of technical reports that have not yet been issued.

=== Arena Trops ===
The Arena Trops, located in the Trops Athlete Training Center, in the neighborhood of Várzea das Moças, in Niterói, was chosen as Niteroiense's official home ground for the 2025 season due to the impossibility of using the Concha Acústica for the professional team. The choice was confirmed after the club obtained all the necessary permits in an inspection carried out that same year. The venue's debut took place on June 25, in the match against America, valid for the first round of the 2025 Copa Rio, which ended in a 0–0 draw.

== Titles ==
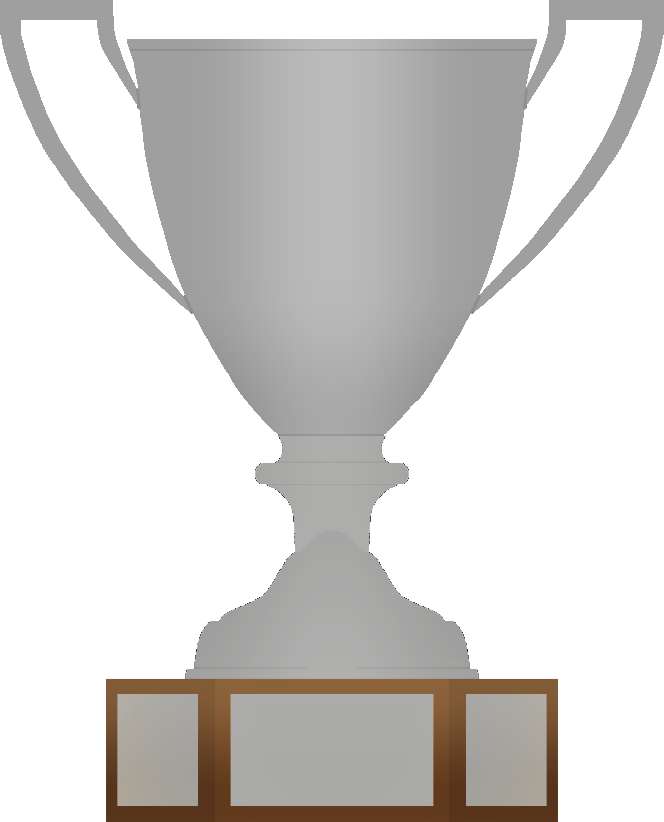
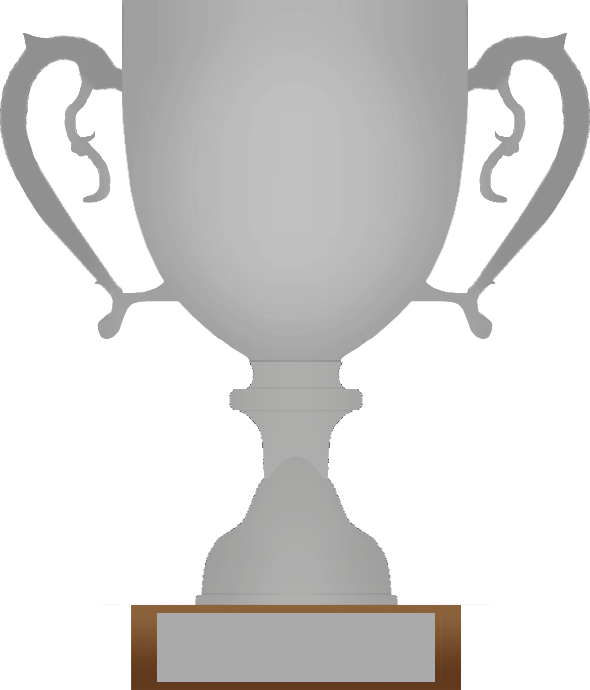
State Titles
Competition	Titles	Seasons
Campeonato Carioca Série C	1	2024
Campeonato Fluminense	1	1918
Torneio Início	1	1923
State League Stage Titles
Competition	Titles	Seasons
Taça Waldir Amaral	1	2024
Municipal Titles
Competition	Titles	Seasons
Campeonato Niteroiense	1	1937
Torneio Início	3	1931, 1943 and 1945
Total
Achievements	Titles	Categories
Official Titles	8	3 State, 1 State League Stage and 4 Municipal titles

== Statistics ==
=== Participations ===
Competition		Participations	Seasons
State leagues
Rio de Janeiro (state)	Copa Rio	1	2025
Rio de Janeiro (state)	Campeonato Carioca Série B1	2	2025–2026
Rio de Janeiro (state)	Campeonato Carioca Série B2	1	2024
Rio de Janeiro (state)	Campeonato Carioca Série C	1	2024
Rio de Janeiro (state)	Campeonato Fluminense (dissolved)	17	1915–1925, 1927, 1956–1958, 1961–1962
Rio de Janeiro (state)	Torneio Início (dissolved)	5	1921–1925
Federal District of Brazil (1891–1960)	Torneio Aberto (dissolved)	1	1935
State league stages
Rio de Janeiro (state)	Taça Corcovado	2	2025–2026
Rio de Janeiro (state)	Taça Maracanã	1	2024
Rio de Janeiro (state)	Taça Waldir Amaral	1	2024
Municipal leagues
Niterói	Campeonato Niteroiense (dissolved)	21	1928–1934, 1937–1939, 1945, 1947–1949, 1952–1953, 1956–1958, 1961–1962
Niterói	Torneio Início (dissolved)	21	1926, 1929, 1931–1932, 1934, 1937–1939, 1940, 1942–1945, 1949–1956, 1961

Participations, in 2026

=== Campaigns ===
Niteroiense Futebol Clube
Competition	Champion	Runner-up	Third place	Fourth place
State leagues
Campeonato Carioca Série B2	0 (não possui)	0 (não possui)	1 (2024)	0 (não possui)
Campeonato Carioca Série C	1 (2024)	0 (não possui)	0 (não possui)	0 (não possui)
Campeonato Fluminense	1 (1918)	2 (1922 e 1924) (Note: It is possible that Niteroiense has already been second place on other occasions.)	Unknown	1 (1919) (Note: It is possible that Niteroiense has already been fourth place on other occasions.)
Torneio Início	1 (1923)	0 (não possui)	—N/a	—N/a
State league stages
Taça Maracanã	0 (não possui)	0 (não possui)	1 (2024)	0 (não possui)
Taça Waldir Amaral	1 (2024)	0 (não possui)	0 (não possui)	0 (não possui)
Municipal leagues
Campeonato Niteroiense	1 (1937)	1 (1934)	3 (1931, 1956 e 1962) (Note: It is possible that Niteroiense has already been third place on other occasions.)	2 (1932 e 1957)
Torneio Início	3 (1931, 1943 e 1945) (Note: It is possible that Niteroiense has already been champions on other occasions.)	1 (1929)	—N/a	—N/a

== Current squad ==
Squad correct as of September 1, 2025.

Pos.	Nation	Player
GK	BRA	Marcílio
GK	BRA	Matheus Brito
GK	BRA	Bryan Oliveira
DF	BRA	Baré
DF	BRA	Pablo Maldini
DF	BRA	Júnior
DF	BRA	Kaique
DF	BRA	Breno
DF	BRA	Adriano
DF	BRA	Rodrigão
DF	BRA	Mamed
DF	BRA	Willian Barbosa
DF	BRA	Davi Nunes
DF	BRA	Pedro Viana
MF	BRA	Bruno Gallo (captain)
MF	BRA	Marcão
MF	BRA	Pipito

Pos.	Nation	Player
MF	BRA	Cafu
MF	BRA	Diguinho
MF	BRA	Ruan
MF	BRA	Kaká
MF	BRA	Maykon
MF	BRA	Matheuzinho
MF	BRA	Cauã Dias
FW	BRA	Léo Itaperuna
FW	BRA	Sabão
FW	BRA	Sassá
FW	BRA	Davi Santos
FW	BRA	William Amendoim
FW	BRA	Antônio
FW	BRA	Luiz Henrique
FW	BRA	Renê
FW	BRA	Fábio Carioca
FW	BRA	Carlos Henrique

== Management team ==
As of August 31, 2025.

Position	Name
Coaching staff
Head coach	(Brazil) Thiago Thomaz
Assistant head coach	(Brazil) Esthevão Lima
Assistant head coach	(Brazil) Michel Costa
Goalkeepers trainer	(Brazil) Thiago Bitelo
Medical staff
Fitness coach	(Brazil) Ary Costa
Fitness coach	(Brazil) Henrique Jr.
Doctor	(Brazil) Olívia Gomide
Physiotherapist	(Brazil) Pedro Feijó
Physiotherapist	(Brazil) Vitório Tácito

== See also ==
- Football in Brazil
- Canto do Rio Foot-Ball Club
- Niterói
