= William Amendoim =

Brazilian footballer

Personal information
- Full name: William das Graças Silva Júnior
- Date of birth: May 6, 1987 (age 39)
- Place of birth: São Gonçalo, Rio de Janeiro, Brazil
- Height: 1.70 m (5 ft 7 in)
- Position: Attacking midfielder

Team information
- Current team: Niteroiense

Youth career
- ?–2007: Flamengo

Senior career*
Years	Team	Apps	(Gls)
2005–2012	Flamengo		(0)
2008	→ Macaé (loan)		(0)
2008	→ Madureira (loan)	0	(0)
2008	→ Bonsucesso (loan)	0	(0)
2009	→ Social (loan)	1	(0)
2009	→ Tombense (loan)	0	(0)
2010	→ Americano (loan)	0	(0)
2010	→ CFZ (loan)	0	(0)
2011	→ Ipatinga (loan)	10	(0)
2012	→ Carapebus (loan)		
2013	CRAC	34	(2)
2014	Anápolis		
2015	Gonçalense		
2016	Bangu		
2017	Portuguesa-RJ		
2017	→ Olaria (loan)		
2018	Bolamense		
2019	Canto do Rio		
2018	Mixto		
2019	Jaraguá		
2019	Tupy-GO		
2020	Estrela do Norte		
2020	Capital		
2020	Duque de Caxias		
2021	Juventude-MA		
2021	Mixto		
2021	Americano		
2021	Bonsucesso		
2022	Americano		
2022	Paduano		
2023	Porto Velho		
2023	Americano		
2023	São Gonçalo		
2024	Ji-Paraná		
2025	Ypiranga-AP		
2025–	Niteroiense	5	(0)
- * Club domestic league appearances and goals as of November 18, 2025

William das Graças Silva Júnior, better known as William Amendoim (born May 6, 1987), is a Brazilian attacking midfielder who plays for Niteroiense.

== Career ==
William Amendoim was born in São Gonçalo, Rio de Janeiro. He was brought up in the youth ranks of Flamengo, in one of the club's most successful generations of young players. He signed a three-year professional contract in 2005. In April 2006 he signed a new five-year deal.

William Amendoim was a member of the generation of players born in 1987–89 to win multiple youth competitions with the Flamengo jersey. Amendoim his youth and senior honors are three titles of the Campeonato Carioca de Juniores Rio de Janeiro, the Copa Belo Horizonte de Juniores, the Copa OPG, the Copa Record and the Copa Cultura, all achieved with Flamengo. However, William Amendoim has played few matches as a senior for Flamengo, coming up once as a substitute in a 2006 Brazilian Série A match against São Caetano, won by Flamengo 4–1. When he looked set to establish himself among the club professionals in early 2007, after a distinguished performance in that year's Rio de Janeiro Campeonato Carioca de Juniores, William Amendoim suffered a serious knee injury that left him sidelined for six months.

In 2008, the young playmaker was loaned to Macaé to play in the senior Rio state championship that year. Due to problems with his contract, however, William ended up not playing for Macaé at all. He was eventually loaned out to Madureira, in time to enroll in the Brazilian Série C competition in July 2008. Still in 2008, he signed another loan contract, with Bonsucesso, where he stayed until the end of the year.

After the series of unsuccessful experiences, Amendoim was loaned out to the Minas Gerais side Social in early 2009, and later that year to Tombense. In 2010, William Amendoim returned to Rio de Janeiro, signing up a loan contract with Americano to compete in the Campeonato Carioca. He was again loaned out in 2010, to CFZ, the club founded by Flamengo greatest legend and then executive director, Zico.

His stay with CFZ was short and in 2010 William returned to Flamengo. He took part in the Campeonato Brasileiro U-23 with the club, hoping to win a chance in the first team.

In January 2011 he left for Ipatinga Futebol Clube on loan.

== Career statistics ==
(Correct as of December 2, 2010)

Club	Season	State League		Brazilian Série A		Copa do Brasil		Copa Libertadores		Copa Sudamericana		Total	
Club	Season	Apps	Goals	Apps	Goals	Apps	Goals	Apps	Goals	Apps	Goals	Apps	Goals
Flamengo	2005	-	-	0	0	-	-	-	-	-	-	0	0
Flamengo	2006	1	0	1	0	0	0	-	-	-	-	3	0
Flamengo	2007	1	0	-	-	-	-	-	-	-	-	1	0
Flamengo	2010	-	-	0	0	-	-	-	-	-	-	0	0
Flamengo	2011	0	0	0	0	0	0	-	-	0	0	0	0
Total		2	0	1	0	0	0	-	-	0	0	3	0

according to combined sources on the Flamengo official website and Flaestatística.

== Honours ==
- Flamengo
  - Copa do Brasil: 2006
  - Taça Guanabara: 2007
  - Campeonato Carioca: 2007
