= Léo Itaperuna =

Brazilian footballer

Personal information
- Full name: Leonardo de Oliveira Clemente
- Date of birth: April 12, 1989 (age 37)
- Place of birth: Itaperuna, Rio de Janeiro, Brazil
- Height: 1.73 m (5 ft 8 in)
- Position: Striker

Team information
- Current team: Niteroiense

Youth career
- 2006: Fluminense

Senior career*
Years	Team	Apps	(Gls)
2007–2011	Fluminense	10	(1)
2008	→ Paulista (loan)	0	(0)
2009	→ America-RJ (loan)	0	(0)
2010	→ CRAC (loan)	0	(0)
2010	→ Duque de Caxias (loan)	4	(0)
2011	→ Cabofriense (loan)	10	(2)
2011	Anápolis	0	(0)
2011–2012	Arapongas	24	(10)
2012–2017	Sion	108	(19)
2015	→ Suwon Bluewings (loan)	11	(1)
2015	→ Jiangxi Liansheng (loan)	13	(2)
2017	Aarau	10	(1)
2018	São Bento	0	(0)
2018	Paraná	11	(0)
2018	Vila Nova	10	(0)
2019	Sertãozinho	0	(0)
2019	Itaboraí	4	(0)
2020	Concórdia	11	(3)
2020–2022	Cascavel	77	(19)
2022	São Gonçalo	7	(8)
2023	Resende	9	(0)
2023	Americano	15	(8)
2023	Paduano	10	(5)
2024	Parintins	14	(4)
2024	Princesa do Solimões	9	(0)
2024	São Gonçalo	11	(2)
2025	Pantanal	11	(3)
2025	São Gonçalo	17	(0)
2025–	Niteroiense	11	(4)
- * Club domestic league appearances and goals as of 21:54, 8 November 2025 (UTC)

Leonardo de Oliveira Clemente (born April 12, 1989, in Itaperuna, state of Rio de Janeiro), or simply Léo Itaperuna, is a Brazilian striker who plays for Niteroiense.

== Career ==
=== Club career ===
Formed in Fluminense, Leo made an immediate impact in Swiss Football after his arrival at Sion, scoring in every friendly game played by his team during the summer preparation.

He was discovered in a small club in the interior of Brazil (Arapongas), seen by media and professionals in Swiss football as: "A strong talented striker, natural finisher." His speed and technique had surprised the football world along with his very strong physical abilities despite his relative small size and undeniable goal scoring skills.

Laurent Fournier, his coach at Sion said of him in an interview: "He's really a refreshing and good surprise for us. Leo have all the kit of the modern perfect striker, he's never short on efforts for the team, fights on every ball, is Lethal on 1 v 1 and despite his short size for a No. 9 (1.73m), he jumps 70cm off the ground. For me, even more important than that in the modern game, he's humble and always starving for work, the key for any talented player to reach success. If he continues this way he will go very far."

His Representative, Rui Alves was quoted lately in an interview saying about: "Leo progressed in a exponential way in the past year. I've have been bluffed by the way he's adapting to Europe and with his progression all this pasts months. I truly believe that the kid will break through really fast in European football if he continues to be focus and committed like this. Switzerland is being the perfect adaptation championship for Leo. You will heard very highly about him very soon without a doubt, if he keeps with this kind of exigences and standards in his game, he's a very very good young man in and out the pitch what makes everything much more easy for him in all senses".
