= Cafu (footballer, born 1996) =

Brazilian footballer

Personal information
- Full name: Otacílio Brito Alves
- Date of birth: 22 January 1996 (age 30)
- Place of birth: Niterói, Brazil
- Height: 1.68 m (5 ft 6 in)
- Position: Midfielder

Team information
- Current team: Niteroiense

Youth career
- 2010–2016: Flamengo

Senior career*
Years	Team	Apps	(Gls)
2016–2017	Flamengo	6	(0)
2016	→ Mumbai City (loan)	13	(1)
2017	→ Ceará (loan)	16	(1)
2018	Botafogo-SP	12	(0)
2018–2019	Estoril	0	(0)
2019	→ São Bento (loan)	20	(1)
2020–2021	Portuguesa-RJ	26	(3)
2021	Esportivo	10	(0)
2022	São Luiz	1	(0)
2022–2023	Portuguesa-RJ	42	(6)
2023	Maricá	8	(1)
2024	Lagarto	11	(0)
2024	Niteroiense	11	(3)
2025	Petrópolis	12	(0)
2025–	Niteroiense	7	(1)
- * Club domestic league appearances and goals as of 02:55, 18 November 2025 (UTC)

Otacílio Brito Alves, also known as Cafu (born 22 January 1996), is a Brazilian professional footballer who plays as a midfielder for Niteroiense.

== Career ==
Born in Niterói, Cafu joined the youth side of Flamengo in 2010. On 5 September 2016 it was announced that he had signed on loan with Mumbai City of the Indian Super League. He made his professional debut for the club on 3 October 2016 against Pune City. He came on as a 73rd minute substitute for Matías Defederico as Mumbai City won 1–0.

== Career statistics ==
As of 29 August 2018

Club	Season	League			Cup		Continental		Other		Total	
Club	Season	Division	Apps	Goals	Apps	Goals	Apps	Goals	Apps	Goals	Apps	Goals
Mumbai City (loan)	2016	ISL	13	1	0	0	—	—	—	—	13	1
Flamengo	2017	Série A	0	0	0	0	—	—	5 (Note: Three appearances in the Rio de Janeiro State League and two appearances in the Brazilian Primeira Liga.)	0	5	0
Ceará (loan)	2017	Série B	16	1	–	–	—	—	–	–	16	1
Botafogo-SP (loan)	2018	Série C	3	0	0	0	—	—	9	0	12	0
Estoril (loan)	2018–19	LigaPro	0	0	0	0	—	—	—	—	0	0
Career total			32	2	0	0	0	0	14	0	46	2
