= Campeonato Carioca Série C =

Football league in Rio de Janeiro, Brazil

- Organising body: FERJ
- Founded: 2021; 5 years ago
- Country: Brazil
- State: (Rio de Janeiro (state)) Rio de Janeiro
- Level on pyramid: 5
- Promotion to: Série B2
- Domestic cup: Copa Rio
- Current champions: Cardoso Moreira (1st title) (2026)
- Most championships: Six clubs (1 title each)
- Website: FERJ Official website

The Campeonato Carioca Série C is the fifth tier of the professional state football league in the Brazilian state of Rio de Janeiro. It is run by the Rio de Janeiro State Football Federation (FERJ).

== List of champions ==
Following is the list with all the champions of the fifth level of Rio de Janeiro and their different nomenclatures over the years.

Season	Champions	Runners-up
2021	Paduano (1)	Búzios
2022	SE Belford Roxo (1)	FC Rio de Janeiro
2023	Zinzane (1)	São Cristóvão
2024	Niteroiense (1)	Uni Souza
2025	Paraty (1)	Santa Cruz
2026	Cardoso Moreira (1)	Búzios

== Titles by team ==
Teams in bold stills active.

Rank	Club	Winners	Winning years
1	**Niteroiense**	1	2024
1	**Paduano**	1	2021
1	**Paraty**	1	2025
1	**SE Belford Roxo**	1	2022
1	Zinzane	1	2023
1	**Cardoso Moreira**	1	2026

=== By city ===
City	Championships	Clubs
Belford Roxo	1	SE Belford Roxo (1)
Cardoso Moreira	1	Cardoso Moreira (1)
Niterói	1	Niteroiense (1)
Paraty	1	Paraty (1)
Rio de Janeiro	1	Zinzane (1)
Santo Antônio de Pádua	1	Paduano (1)
