= Cardoso Moreira Futebol Clube =

Football club in Brazil

Cardoso Moreira
- Full name: Cardoso Moreira Futebol Clube
- Nicknames: Marreco; Cardosão; Tricolor Cardosense
- Founded: March 19, 1935
- Ground: Antônio Ferreira de Medeiros
- Capacity: 10,000
- President: Marcos Aurélio Zaquieu
Home colours	Away colours

Cardoso Moreira Futebol Clube, usually known simply as Cardoso Moreira, is a club Brazilian football club from Cardoso Moreira, Rio de Janeiro state, currently playing in the 5th tier of football in Rio de Janeiro.

The club plays its home matches at Antônio Ferreira de Medeiros. Cardoso Moreira competed in the Campeonato Carioca in 2008 and won the Campeonato Carioca Fourth Level in 1994 and the Campeonato Carioca Third Level in 2006.

== History ==
The club was founded on March 19, 1935.

In 1994, Cardoso Moreira won the Campeonato Carioca Fourth Level, and in 2006 the club won the Campeonato Carioca Third Level, after beating Silva Jardim in the final. In 2007, the club was promoted to the following year's Campeonato Carioca. and on January 19, 2008, the club played its first Campeonato Carioca match, against Fluminense. Fluminense beat Cardoso Moreira 2-0.

== Honours ==
- Campeonato Carioca Série B1: 2006
- Campeonato Carioca Série B2: 1994
- Campeonato Carioca Série C: 2026

== Stadium ==
Cardoso Moreira's home stadium is Antônio Ferreira de Medeiros, with a maximum capacity of 10,000 people.
