= 2024 Guarani FC season =

Guarani FC
2024 season
- Stadium: Estádio Brinco de Ouro
- Série B: 20th
- Top goalscorer: Caio Dantas (4)

The 2024 Guarani FC season is the club's 113th season in existence and the eighth consecutive season in the second division of Brazilian football. In addition to the domestic league, Guarani are participating in this season's editions of the Campeonato Paulista and the Copa do Brasil.

== Pre-season and friendlies ==
Win Draw Loss

== Competitions ==
=== Overall record ===
Competition	First match	Last match	Starting round	Record							
Competition	First match	Last match	Starting round	Pld	W	D	L	GF	GA	GD	Win %
Série B	23 April 2024	26 November 2024	Matchday 1	12	1	2	9	9	21	−12	8.33
Campeonato Paulista				0	0	0	0	0	0	+0	—
Copa do Brasil				0	0	0	0	0	0	+0	—
				0	0	0	0	0	0	+0	—
Total				12	1	2	9	9	21	−12	8.33

Source: [ Soccerway]

=== Campeonato Brasileiro Série B ===
==== League table ====
Pos	Team	Pld	W	D	L	GF	GA	GD	Pts	Promotion or relegation
16	CRB	38	11	10	17	38	45	−7	43	
17	Ponte Preta (R)	38	10	8	20	37	55	−18	38	Relegation to 2025 Campeonato Brasileiro Série C
18	Ituano (R)	38	11	4	23	43	63	−20	37	Relegation to 2025 Campeonato Brasileiro Série C
19	Brusque (R)	38	8	12	18	24	44	−20	36	Relegation to 2025 Campeonato Brasileiro Série C
20	Guarani (R)	38	8	9	21	33	53	−20	33	Relegation to 2025 Campeonato Brasileiro Série C

Source: CBF
Rules for classification: 1) points; 2) wins; 3) goal difference; 4) goals scored; 5) head-to-head results (only between 2 teams); 6) fewest red cards; 7) fewest yellow cards; 8) drawing of lots.
(R) Relegated

==== Results summary ====
Overall								Home						Away					
Pld	W	D	L	GF	GA	GD	Pts	W	D	L	GF	GA	GD	W	D	L	GF	GA	GD
0	0	0	0	0	0	0	0	0	0	0	0	0	0	0	0	0	0	0	0

==== Results by round ====
Round	1
Ground	
Result	
Position	

A = Away; H = Home; W = Win; D = Draw; L = Loss

==== Matches ====
23 April 2024	Vila Nova	2–0	Guarani

27 April 2024	Guarani	0–1	Chapecoense

7 May 2024	Santos	4–1	Guarani

11 May 2024	Guarani	2–0	Botafogo-SP

15 May 2024	Coritiba	1–0	Guarani

21 May 2024	Guarani	1–2	América Mineiro

26 May 2024	Guarani	0–0	Paysandu

5 June 2024	Mirassol	3–0	Guarani

8 June 2024	Guarani	0–1	Operário

15 June 2024	Avaí	3–2	Guarani

19 June 2024	Guarani	3–3	Ituano

22 June 2024	CRB	1–0	Guarani

30 June 2024	Guarani	v	Ponte Preta

=== Campeonato Paulista ===
Pos	Team	Pld	W	D	L	GF	GA	GD	Pts	Qualification
1	Palmeiras	12	8	4	0	20	9	+11	28	Knockout stage
2	Ponte Preta	12	4	5	3	15	11	+4	17	Knockout stage
3	Água Santa	12	4	3	5	8	11	−3	15	
4	Guarani	12	2	4	6	10	14	−4	10	

Source: Soccerway
