= Sociedade Esportiva de Búzios =

Brazilian football club

Buzios
- Full name: Sociedade Esportiva de Buzios
- Founded: 15 May 1971
- Stadium: Estádio Municipal de Búzios
Home colors	Away colors

Sociedade Esportiva de Buzios, known in English as The Sports Society of Buzios, or known simply as Buzios, is a men's professional Brazilian football club based in Búzios, Rio de Janeiro. The club was founded on May 15, 1971.

== History ==
After conquering the four-time Buziana league of Sports in the Junior category in 2008, Buzios embarked in 2011 on its debut in professional football by joining the FFERJ Squad for the Rio de Janeiro State Championship Series.

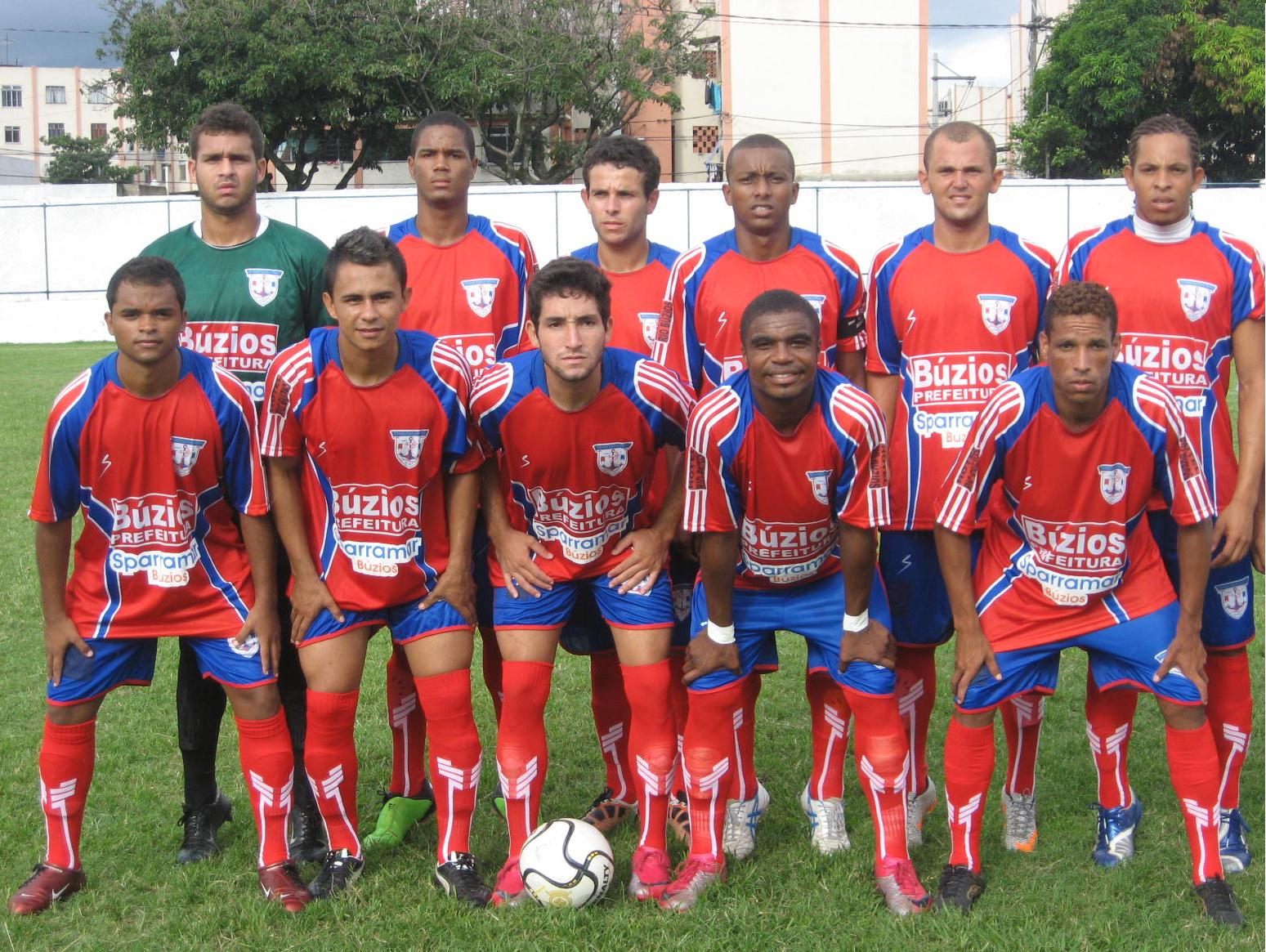
Búzios professional team in 2011.

== See also ==
- List of Brazilian football clubs
- Copa do Brasil
- Brazilian Football league system
