= Bela Vista Futebol Clube =

Brazilian football club

Bela Vista
- Full name: Bela Vista Futebol Clube
- Founded: 10 May 1977
- Ground: Alziro Almeida
- Capacity: 4,000
Home colours	Away colours

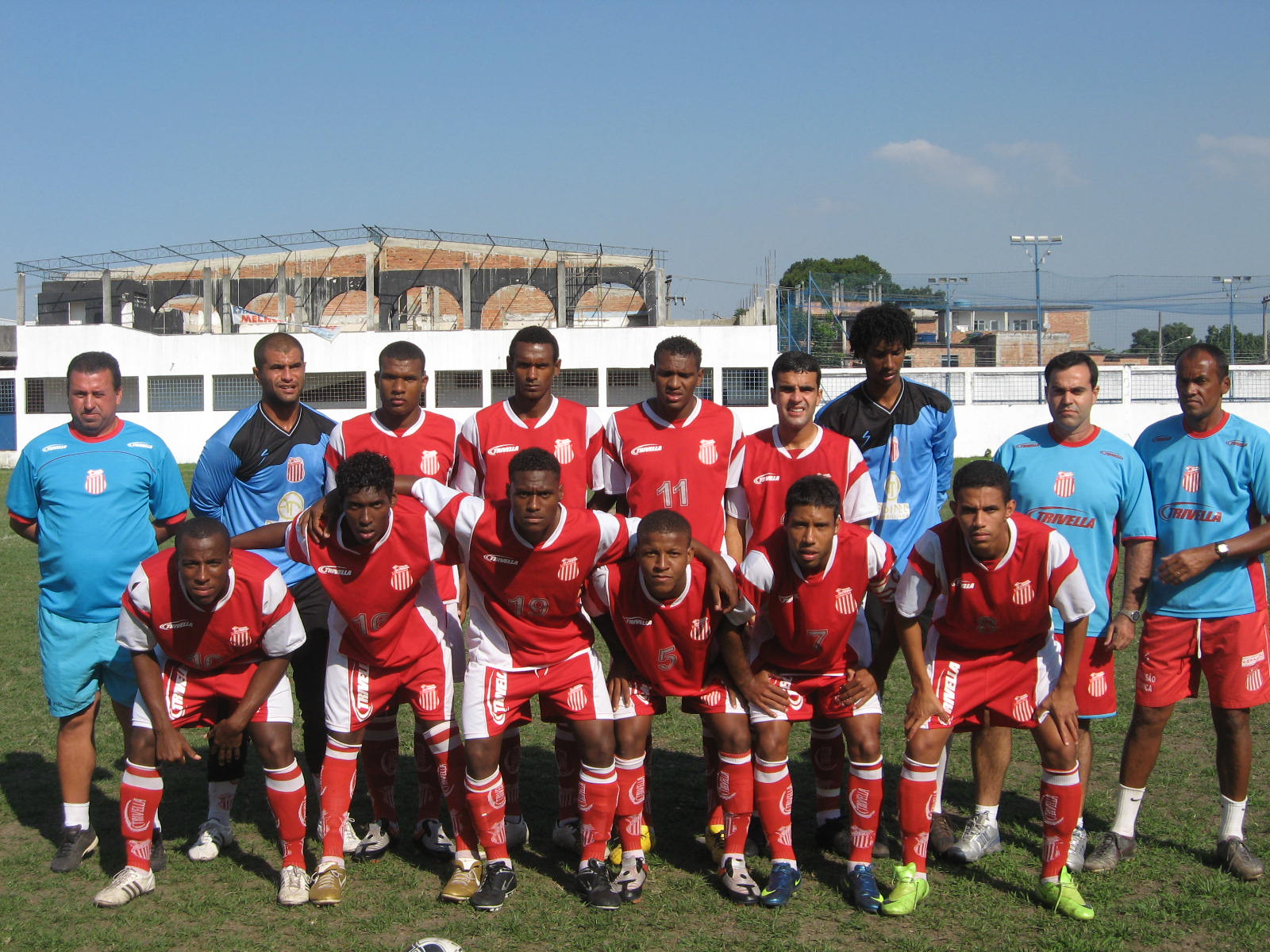
Team photo from the 2009 season

Bela Vista Futebol Clube is a Brazilian football team from the city of São Gonçalo, Rio de Janeiro state, founded on May 10, 1977 in the city of Niterói.

== Stadium ==
The home stadium Alziro Almeida has a capacity of 4,000 people. The stadium is also known as Alzirão.

== Colors ==
The official colors are red and white.
