= Arariboia =

Brazilian city founder

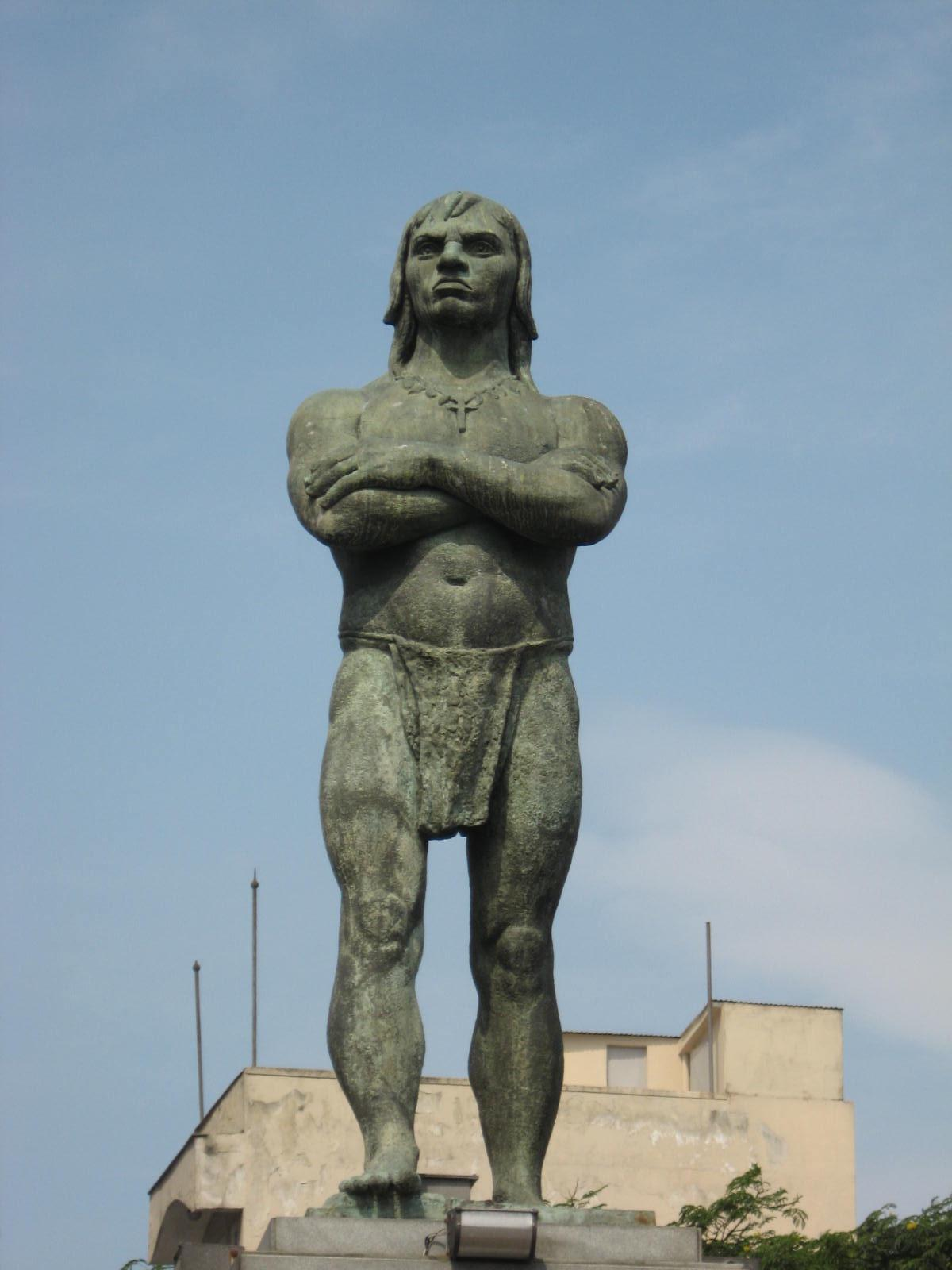
Statue of Arariboia

Arariboia (old spelling: Ararigboya; c. 1520 – 1589) was the founder of the city of Niterói, in Brazil.

Son of Temiminó chief Maracajá-guaçu, he was the leader of the Temiminó tribe, which inhabited the territory of the present Espírito Santo state after losing their territories to long-term enemies, the Tamoios, only to come back to Rio de Janeiro in 1564 with Estacio de Sá's fleet. Under his leadership, the tribe assisted the Portuguese in their war with France for total control of the Guanabara Bay, sending an infantry of armed soldiers to retake the Guanabara Bay from the French, as Arariboia had become the leader of the Temiminó, after his father, reinforcing the Bay with about 8,000 Indigenous soldiers, who were quite knowledgeable of the territory, as they once called it home.

The French, meanwhile, had settled in the Guanabara Bay in 1555, occupying the Serigipe Island (current Ilha de Villegagnon), where they built the Coligny Fort. To counter Portuguese forces, the French commander, Nicolas Durand de Villegagnon, formed an alliance with the Tamoios, native indigenous people, allocating about 70,000 people by the coast. The agreement prevented the forces sent from Salvador by Mem de Sá, governor-general of Brazil in 1565, from achieving a definitive victory against the French. With the unity of the colony in danger, Mem de Sá sent his nephew Estácio de Sá in and entrusted him to adopt the same strategy as the French: enlist indigenous support.

The most violent confrontation occurred on January 20, 1567, at Uruçumirim, on the present-day Glória hill, where the French and Tamoios were quartered. Climbing over cliffs, Arariboia was the first to enter the enemy stronghold. He held a torch, with which he blew up the powder and opened the way for the attack. During the fight, a poisoned arrow grazed Estácio de Sá's face, who later died of infection. The attack was followed by a nightly slaughter, from which the Portuguese and Temimimó forces emerged victorious. In a legendary episode, Arariboia allegedly swam across the bay to lead the assault.

After their victory, Arariboia remained in Rio de Janeiro until 1573, when his tribe officially received the lands (sesmaria) across the Guanabara Bay on November 22. The fact is that, with his support, the Portuguese operation against the French was successful, and the Portuguese regained control over Guanabara Bay. From then on, the city of Rio de Janeiro, which in the meantime had been founded by Estácio de Sá in 1565 by the Cara de Cão hill, was assured of its survival. After the defeat of the Tamoios, as a reward for his deeds, Arariboia received from the Portuguese Crown, first, a piece of land in today's São Cristóvão, close to Ilha do Governador. Later, in 1573, he received a piece of land on the other side of Guanabara Bay, where he would have the mission to protect the other side of the bay's entrance.

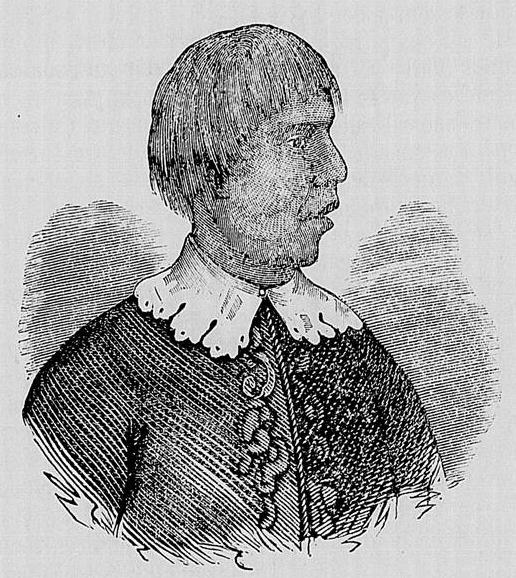
Martim Afonso (Arariboia), chief of the Temiminós

This sesmaria (piece of land given by the Portuguese Crown) was named São Lourenço dos Índios, which is now considered the beginning of the current city of Niterói (term that, translated from the Tupi language, means "true cold river", by the junction of 'y, "river; eté, "true"; and ro'y, "cold"), 30 minutes away from Rio de Janeiro, by ferry boat. He converted to Christianity and adopted the name Martim Afonso de Sousa, in honour of the Portuguese navigator of the same name, who commanded a Portuguese exploration that touched Guanabara, in 1530. Also the chieftain Tibiriçá, from the Planalto Paulista adopted the name Martim Afonso de Sousa. He ended his days in conflict with the new Governador-General of the southern part of the state of Brazil (headquartered in Rio de Janeiro), Antônio Salema (1575–1577). At the official inauguration ceremony, Arariboia, having travelled from Niterói to Rio de Janeiro, sat down with his legs crossed.

This displeased the governor, who reprimanded him. Arariboia retorted, "My legs are tired from fighting so hard for your King, that's why I cross them when I sit down". The elderly cacique then returned to the sesmaria of Niterói, and is said to never have set foot in Rio de Janeiro again.

Arariboia also received the title of knight of the Order of Christ, Captain of the village (Capitão-Mor), a salary of 12,000 réis per year and a piece of clothing that had belonged to King Sebastian I of Portugal.

In 1568, he received the Christian name of Martim Afonso, to honour Martim Afonso de Sousa.

Arariboia drowned near the island of Mocanguê in 1589.

In Tupi, his name refers to a venomous snake from the Boidae family.

Notable descendants

Violante do Céu Soares de Sousa

Indigenous woman descendant of Araribóia, married to Domingos de Araújo. She donated the land for the construction of a chapel in 1652, the origin of the current São Domingos de Gusmão Church, located in Niterói, in front of the Gragoatá Campus of the Universidade Federal Fluminense.

José Luíz of Araribóia Cardoso

José Luís do Nascimento Cardoso founded the Glorifying Commission to Martim Afonso Arariboia - also referred to as the Devotion to São Lourenço, and was president of the Commission. José Luiz introduced himself as being of the 12th generation of descendants of the Temiminó chief Araribóia, a justification used to have him sign in the works of the Commission as José Luís de Araribóia Cardoso. He was archivist and janitor of the São Lourenço dos Índios Church, playing a key role in the organisation of the works of the Glorifying Commission.

The holiday of November 22 became "Araribóia Day" in the city of Niterói from the reclamation of José Luís, and became an official holiday as of 1909, even though, since 2021, the date is no longer considered a municipal holiday. Another important contribution of the Commission based on José Luiz's proposition was the transfer of the ownership of the São Lourenço dos Índios Church to the municipality of Niterói, according to Ordinance No. 476, June 13, 1934, when José Luíz de Araribóia Cardoso took on the position of archivist and janitor as a municipal civil servant. If today we think of Araribóia as the mythological founder of Niterói, this is due both to the figure of José Luiz and to the work of the Glorifying Commission, dissolved in 1915 for unknown reasons.
