= Richard Mason (explorer) =

British explorer (1935–1961)

- Mason in 1961
- Born: 28 March 1935; St Leonards-on-Sea, Sussex, United Kingdom
- Died: 3 September 1961 (aged 26) (Note: A notice in The London Gazette on 3 October 1961 stated that Mason had died on 4 September 1961. However, a report in The Singapore Free Press on 9 September 1961 stated that he had been attacked "last Sunday", which would have been 3 September, and this date is confirmed by photographs of Mason's gravestone.); Pará, Brazil
- Cause of death: Killed by the Panará, an uncontacted Amazonian tribe
- Resting place: Cemitério dos Ingleses, Rio de Janeiro, Brazil
- Education: Magdalen College, Oxford
- Occupation: Explorer

Richard Maurice Ledingham Mason (28 March 1935 – 3 September 1961) was a British explorer and the last British person to have been killed by an uncontacted indigenous tribe.

== Biography ==
=== Early life and first expedition ===
Mason was born in St Leonards-on-Sea, Sussex. He was educated at Westerleigh Preparatory School St Leonard's (the school was evacuated to Black Hall in Avonwick, Devon, from 1940 to 1944) and later in 1948 Lancing College, and then read medicine at Magdalen College, Oxford. While at university, he became involved with the Royal Geographical Society and made friends that would share his love of exploration. In 1958, with fellow Oxford undergraduate Robin Hanbury-Tenison, he set out on his first expedition, which involved traveling by jeep 6,000 miles (9,700 km) across South America at its widest point, east to west from Recife, Brazil, to Lima, Peru. They were the first explorers to make this journey.

=== Second expedition and death ===
In 1961, with the aid of the Society once again and additional funding from the Daily Express newspaper, Mason organized his second, and more ambitious expedition to South America. This would involve the exploration and mapping of the 1,100-kilometre (680 mi) Iriri River, a tributary of the Xingu in central Brazil, then believed to be the longest unexplored river in the world. He took with him fellow Oxford graduates, John Hemming, who was deputy leader of the expedition, and Christopher "Kit" Lambert. The three young men would be going where no Western man had been before. There were not only no maps, but no aerial photographs. By May 1961, the three were flying in a World War II Dakota plane to a small airstrip in the middle of the Amazon jungle called Cachimbo, 1,200 miles (1,900 km) northwest of Rio de Janeiro.

The 11-man expedition included five native porters who would carry their one-and-a-half ton of supplies and a 3-man survey team from the Brazilian Institute of Geography and Statistics sent with them by the government to map the unknown areas. The Brazilian government gave the expedition permission to name the features it found, like waterfalls or streams, which the party named after their then Brazilian girlfriends.

On 12 July 1961, after cutting their way through miles of thick brush with machetes, carrying their now limited supplies, and working off compass bearings and the stars, the expedition finally came across the river on the border of the Mato Grosso and Pará states. A camp with a jetty was built and the five porters started hewing two dugout canoes out of fallen tree trunks using axes and adzes. After this was completed the team was ready to descend the Iriri. The survey team then concluded that the river they found was not in fact the Iriri, but that they were 7 miles (11 km) off course. By late August, after adjusting their course and still not able to locate the river, the team began running low on supplies, especially food. It was decided that Hemming should head back to Rio alone and arrange for food and equipment to be flown out by the Brazilian Air Force. Arriving back in Cachimbo during the first week of September, Hemming was given the news by Lambert that Mason had been killed. It turned out that on 3 September, Mason had been heading back from Cachimbo by himself with a few supplies when an unknown indigenous hunting party laid an ambush and killed him with 6-foot (1.8 m) long bamboo poison arrows and clubs. When Mason did not return, Lambert and a scout went looking for him. Hemming describes in his 2004 book, Die If You Must, what they discovered on the trail that they had cut:

Mason's body was found, lying on the main supply trail a few kilometers from our camp. He was carrying a load (mostly sugar) ... and had walked into an Indian ambush. He had been hit by eight arrows, and his skull and thigh were smashed by club blows. Some 40 arrows and 17 heavy clubs were arranged around the body.

Accompanied by a member of the Brazilian Indian Protection Service, Hemming left gifts such as machetes and fishing line at the spot where Mason had been killed to show they bore no ill will to his killers. Hemming and Lambert then helped to carry the body out of the jungle after he had been embalmed. At Cachimbo a BAF aircraft carrying two doctors and medical supplies arrived, but due to the torrential rain it was unable to take off again. A second, lighter aircraft had to be chartered to take the group back to Rio. In Rio, Lambert was initially arrested by the Brazilian police who thought he might have had something to do with the murder, but the Daily Express, which had helped fund the expedition, intervened and he was released. Mason was buried on 17 September in the Cemitério dos Ingleses situated in the Gamboa district in Rio.

=== The Panará ===
In 1973, the tribe responsible for killing Mason made contact with civilization after nearly being wiped out by western diseases, especially measles. They were a people known as the Panará or Kreen-Akrore, variations of the Kayapó name "kran iakarare", which means "round-cut head" – a reference to their traditional haircut. They were very tall and proved to be one of the most warlike indigenous peoples in the Amazon for whom the words "stranger" and "enemy" were the same. They were feared by neighboring tribes who stated that the Panará were at war with everybody.

In 1998, Hemming visited the remainder of the Panará tribe and met an old man named Teseya, who remembered the ambush. The native told him that the attackers came from a place called "Yopuyupaw", which means the "village of the round fish". He said that the Indians had heard Mason approaching and it had been the first time they had seen clothes or metal, and that when they saw that he was alone, they immediately killed him. As was their custom, they then left their weapons by his body. Hemming wrote about this encounter in The Times and in his 2015 book, Naturalists in Paradise: Wallace, Bates and Spruce in the Amazon, stating:

(The Panará) had had no knowledge of clothes and the swish-swish of Mason’s jeans as he walked had unnerved them.

An old lady named Suakye told Hemming they had also found Mason's revolver and cigarette lighter and had tried to smash them both. Hemming asked her what had happened to the machetes he left there. The woman then retrieved an old, rusty machete and stuck it in a log telling him that the Panará had no use for them. She then comforted him and said: "That was in the old days when we did not know white men. We did not know there are good white men and bad white men."
