= Brazilian Army Aviation (1919–1941) =

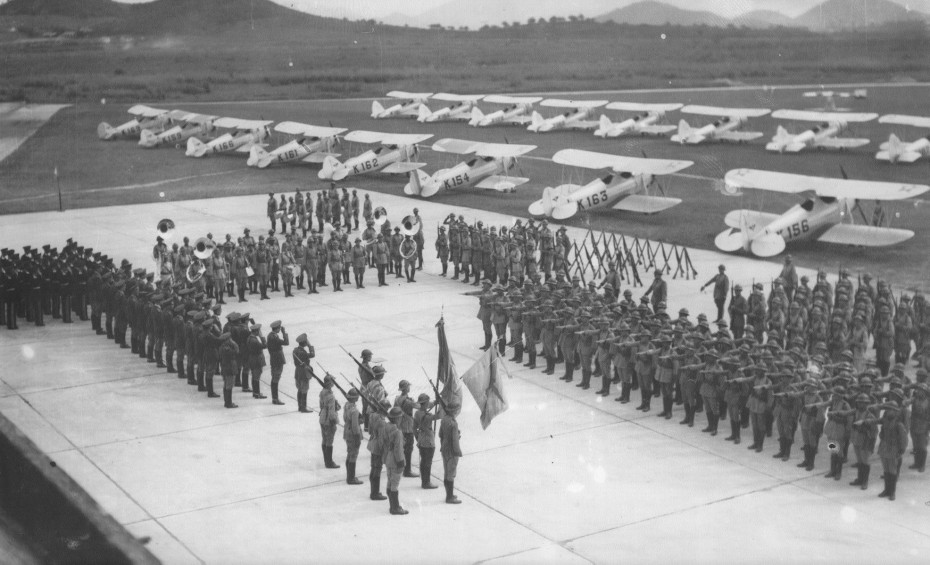
Graduation at the Military Aviation School

Brazilian Army Aviation, created in 1919, operated fixed-wing aircraft (planes) as part of the Brazilian Army until its incorporation into the Brazilian Air Force in 1941, when it ceased to exist. The Brazilian Army returned to having an air component in 1986, with the same name and history, but using rotary-wing aircraft (helicopters) instead. From 1927 to 1941, aviation became the fifth branch of the army, alongside infantry, cavalry, artillery and engineering. Its staff were trained at the Military Aviation School, founded in 1919 in Campo dos Afonsos, Rio de Janeiro, and remembered as a precursor to the current Army Aviation Instruction Center and Air Force Academy.

The army's first aerial experience was with observation balloons in the Paraguayan War, in 1867. At the beginning of the 20th century, the military use of a new technology, the airplanes, attracted interest in Brazil. Their use in the army began in the Contestado War, where Ricardo Kirk, the only Brazilian army aviator at the time, died in a flight accident in 1915. There was no aerospace industry in the country, and it was difficult to create a military aviation school. The Brazilian Navy managed to create its Naval Aviation in 1916, and the army, taking advantage of the equipment leftovers from the First World War and the hiring of French instructors, founded its Aviation Service in 1919.

In addition to the school at Campo dos Afonsos, a flight group was established in Rio Grande do Sul in 1922, but deactivated in 1928. The involvement of aviators with tenentism led to a halt in the development of aviation by president Artur Bernardes from 1924 to 1926. In 1931, the military air mail and a new operational unit, the Mixed Aviation Group, were created. Brazilian military aviation had its first use on a large scale in the Constitutionalist Revolution of 1932. From 1933 onwards, aviation spread outside Rio de Janeiro, with regiments founded throughout the country, and in 1941 it already had 330 aircraft, although not all of them were modern or in good condition.

The aviators developed their own ethos, differentiating themselves from their companions on land and contributing to the formation of the Brazilian Air Force in 1941. This new institution united army and naval aviation and also centralized the administration of commercial flights, arising from a civilian and military movement who saw the separate existence of army and naval aviation as a resource waste. Army Aviation was recreated in 1986, but only using helicopters.

== Beginnings ==
=== Aerostation ===
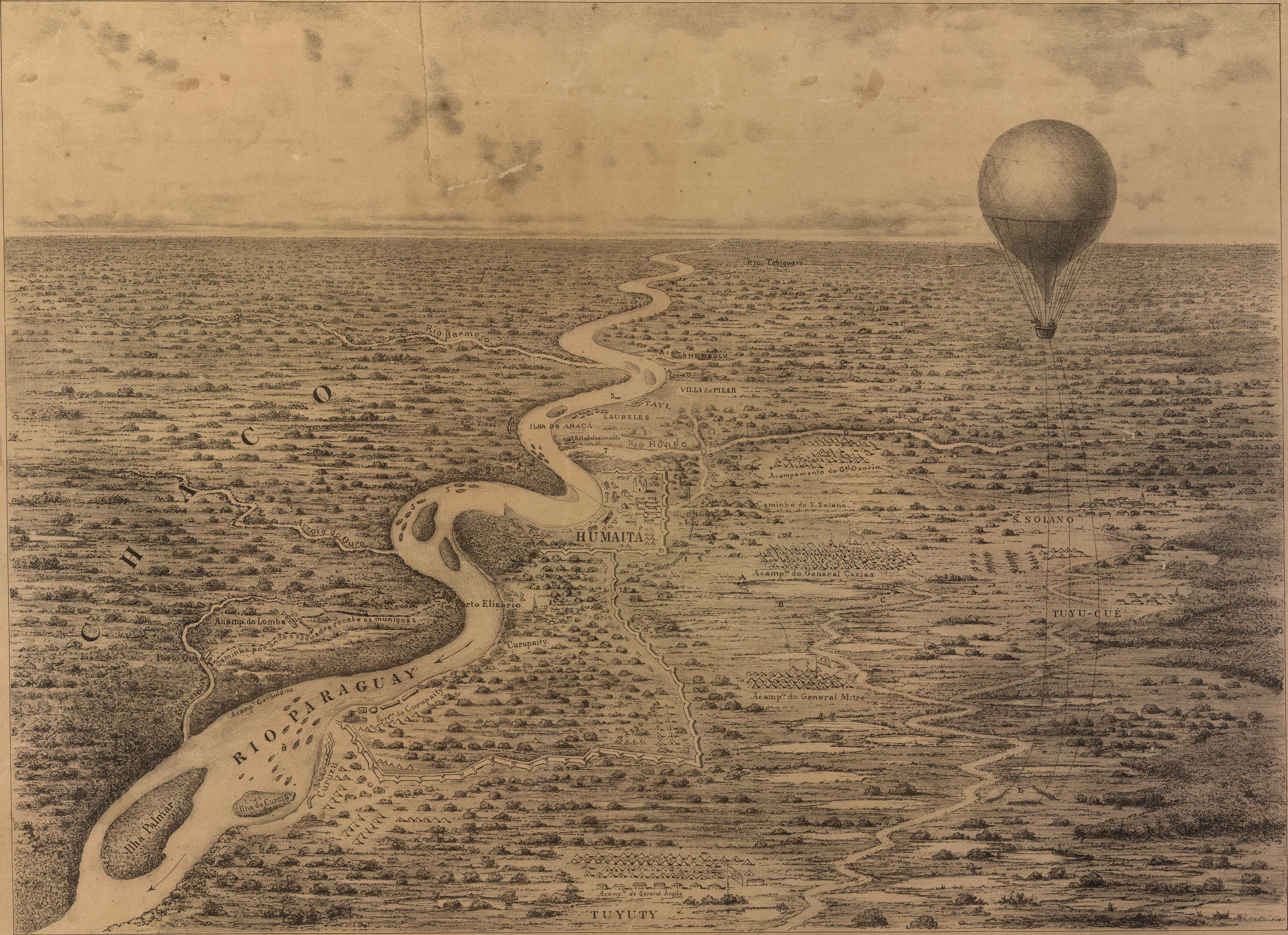
Aerial observation of Paraguayan fortifications during the Siege of Humaitá

The Brazilian Army was the pioneer in the military use of aerial assets in South America during the Paraguayan War. During the Siege of Humaitá in 1867, the Brazilian commander, the Duke of Caxias, requested tethered balloons to observe the Paraguayan positions, as the terrain was flat and the precarious wooden observation posts, called mangrullos, had insufficient vision. Aerial reconnaissance identified the Paraguayan fortified lines. The use of balloons was abandoned by the army after the war, but was taught at the Military Academy. Interest resumed at the beginning of the 20th century, inspired by the experiences of other countries and Alberto Santos-Dumont's success in France.

In 1907, first lieutenant Juventino Fernandes da Fonseca was sent to Paris to buy two aerospace parks, each consisting of two cutting-edge balloons. They were a spherical French military design, and therefore unstable in winds above 30 km/h. After two rises in France and one in Belgium, Fonseca returned to Brazil, built a hangar and set up the park's equipment next to the Artillery and Engineering School in Realengo. He tested their ascension on 20 May 1908, in front of the Military Academy and War Minister Hermes da Fonseca. Lieutenant Ricardo Kirk was also supposed to go up, but he did not participate at Fonseca's request, who feared a problem. Indeed, the ballon broke free from the mooring cable and rose without control. Fonseca activated the gas exhaust valve, but it stuck in the open position, causing a sudden leak of hydrogen, the ballon's fall and the pilot's death. The army continued with its attempts and still planned the creation of airstation units until 1933, but they were never formed.

=== Airplanes ===
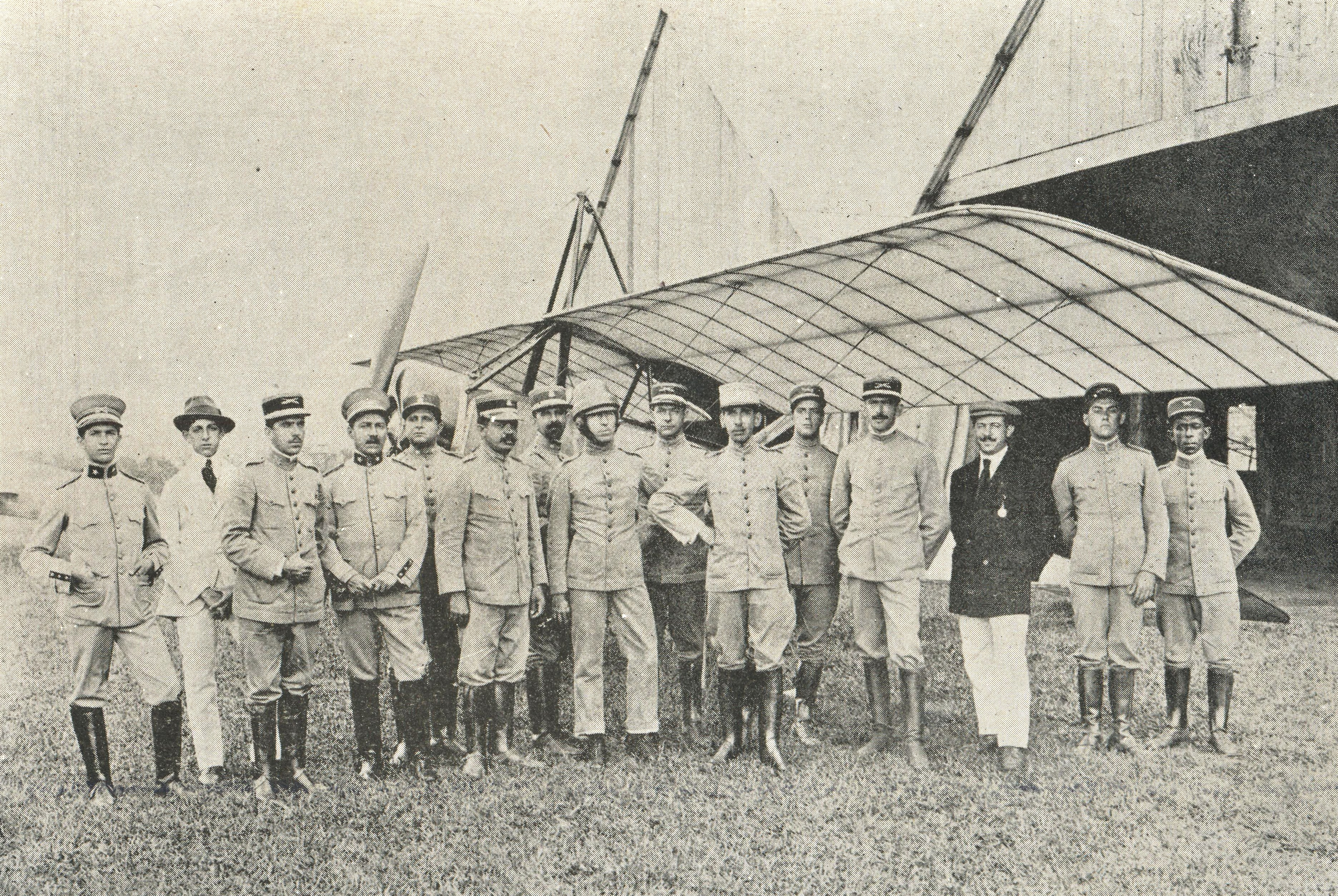
General Setembrino de Carvalho with lieutenant Ricardo Kirk in the Contestado War

Airplanes, a new technology whose military usefulness was demonstrated in the Italo-Turkish War of 1911, were part of the military reforms discussed at the time in Brazil. In the absence of an aeronautical structure in the country, the navy and army sent lieutenants Jorge Henrique Moller and Ricardo Kirk to learn piloting in France in 1911 and 1912 respectively. However, acceptance of new technologies was difficult. The Aeroclube do Brasil (AeCB), a private organization with high-ranking military personnel in its leadership, campaigned in the press in favor of aeronautics, including military aviation. In 1914, a partnership between the army, navy and the firm Gino, Buccelli & Cia created the Brazilian Aviation School, in Campo dos Afonsos, but it operated for only four months and did not get to form any pilots.

Acquiring aeronautical material, hiring the scarce instructors and specialist mechanics, and forming an aviation school was difficult. There was no aeronautical industry in South America, just isolated cases such as the Aribu and Alagoas planes of army captain Marcos Evangelista da Costa Villela Junior. His work on Aribu began at the Cartridges and War Materiel factory in Realengo in 1911. War Minister Vespasiano de Albuquerque denied his request for support, and construction proceeded slowly. The Aribu flew in 1917. It was a monoplane built with locally produced material, except for the 50 horsepower engine, imported from France. The structure was made of wood and the covers were made of fabric. The propeller was designed and built by Vilella, using local wood. The Alagoas began to be built in the same year, this time with government support, and flew in 1918. It was a considerably more developed aircraft than the Aribu. Using the fuselage of a Bleriot plane, Vilella designed the wings and propellers and equipped the device with an imported 80 horsepower Luckt engine. Later, major Vilela was the highest-ranking officer to be part of the new aviation branch and the first brigadier of the Brazilian Air Force.

The Contestado War was an opportunity to experiment with military aviation. In September 1914, general Setembrino de Carvalho, who was appointed commander on that front, included reconnaissance planes in his operational plans. He asked the Minister of War for the participation of Ricardo Kirk, the only aviator in the entire army. Kirk went to the region with Italian civil aviator Ernesto Darioli and three planes, two of which were lost along the way. After some training and reconnaissance flights, Kirk died in an accident while flying in the current municipality of General Carneiro, Paraná, on 1 March 1915.

Meanwhile, in Europe, aviation in the First World War underwent a technological and organizational leap. For the first time, airplanes were consistently used on a large scale in combat. Because of the war, it was difficult to import aircraft and parts. Brazil had to wait until after the armistice to import the leftovers from the conflict at low prices. The navy took the lead in the area of aviation and in 1916 acquired the first three Brazilian military aircraft in the United States. Its Naval Aviation expanded steadily in the following years. In turn, the army sent officers to train as aviators in the navy and in France and contracted the French Military Aviation Mission in 1918, later included in the French Military Instruction Mission. In November 1918, the National Congress of Brazil granted credit for the creation of Army Aviation.

== Organization ==
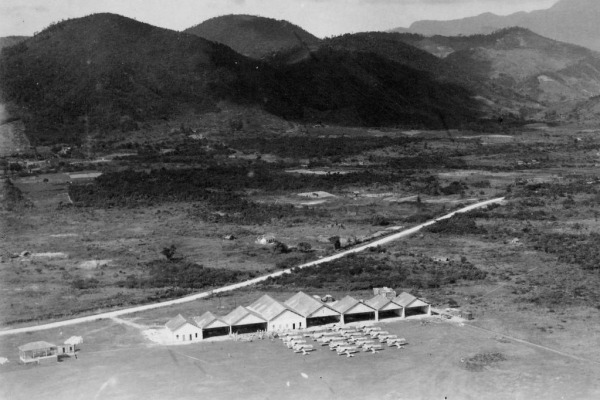
The Military Aviation School in the year of its foundation

Aviation was the army's great novelty in the 1920s. The Military Aviation Service and School were created in 1919. This institution, also located in Campo dos Afonsos, is remembered as the precursor of two current schools, the Army Aviation Instruction Center and the Air Force Academy. It trained pilot and observer officers and mechanical sergeants. The planes were imported, initially with French leftovers from the war. In the beginning, priority was given to observers, and aviation was seen in a certain way as an auxiliary to artillery. French influence was strong. The Brazilians considered the French instructors to be excellent pilots, but personal relationships had their frictions.

Army, naval and commercial aviation were managed independently, under the ministries of War, Navy and Transport and Public Works respectively. Even some of the Public Forces, nicknamed "small state armies", had military aviation squadrons, such as the Public Force of São Paulo and the Military Brigade of Rio Grande do Sul. The centralizing government of Getúlio Vargas prohibited the Public Forces from possessing combat aircraft in 1931.

The 1922 army reorganization provided for twelve aviation squadrons — five observation squadrons (divisional squadrons), three fighter squadrons, three bombing squadrons and one mixed squadron. This would require 180 aircraft and a personnel expansion of more than a thousand soldiers, but budgetary conditions were far below plans. The expansion did get to occur in Rio Grande do Sul, close to Argentina, which was ahead of Brazil in aviation and was the subject of plans for a defensive war. The first two designs used there were the Breguet 14 and Spad 7. 45 aircraft were expected to operate in the Rio Grande do Sul Aviation Squadron Group. 30 actually existed, of which only four were still operational in 1926, and the group was deactivated in 1928. The effective decentralization of aviation only occurred from 1933.

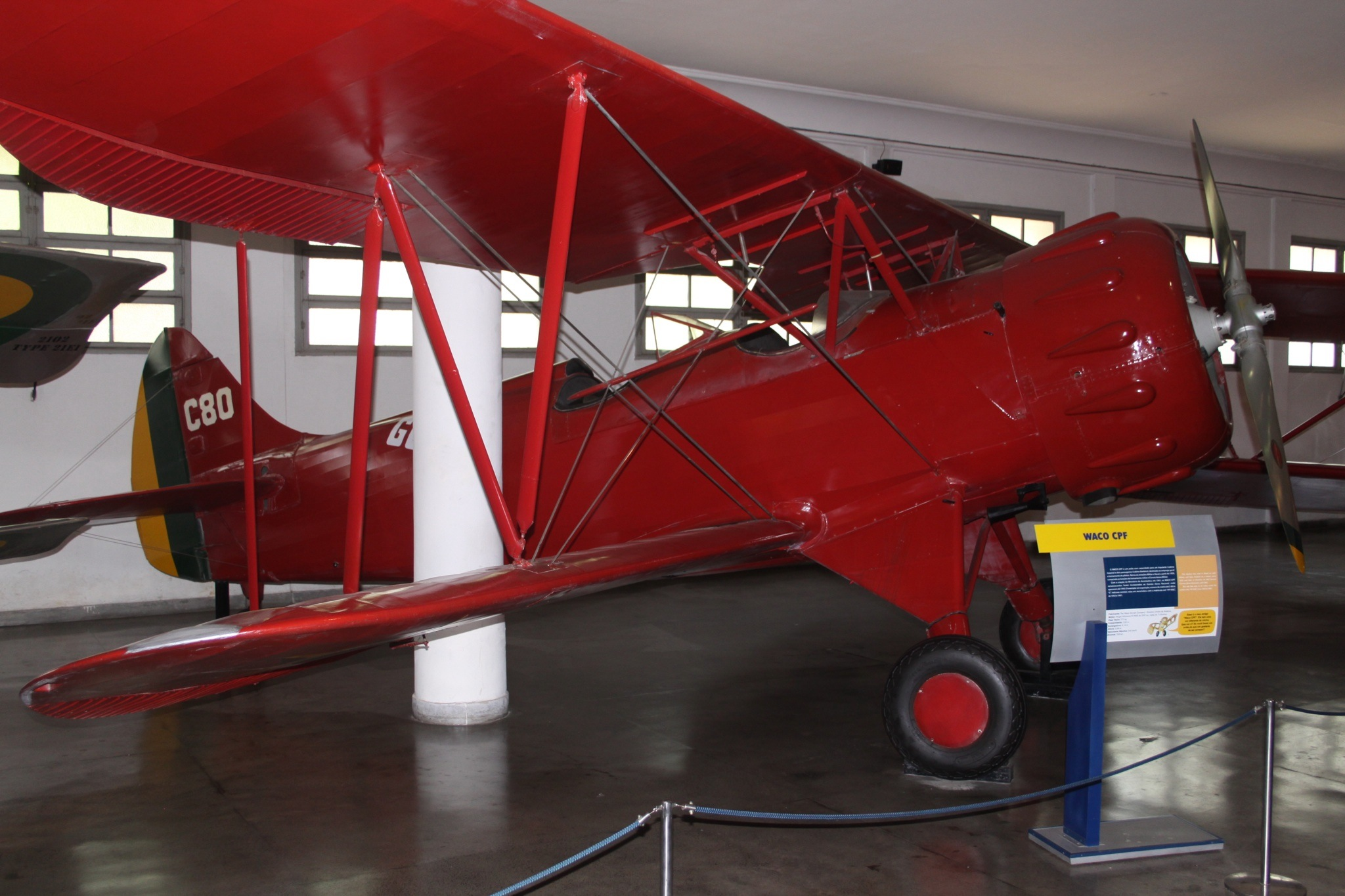
Waco plane at Musal, Campo dos Afonsos

In 1927, aviation was elevated to the status of branch, being equated with traditional service branches such as infantry, cavalry and engineering. The idea of the "Fifth Branch" had existed since the previous decade. Commentators in the magazine A Defesa Nacional (National Defense) condemned the occupation of management bodies by officers without aerial experience and demanded reorganization and increased budgets. The new branch's central body was the Aviation Directorate, responsible for both the Aviation School and the squadrons to be created. The officer staff was made up of officers from other branches, but with degrees in piloting or observation. The new officers (second lieutenants) came from the Military School's aviation course. Permanence and advancement in the hierarchy depended on periodic flight tests.

The only aviation unit was the school itself until 1931, with the creation of the Mixed Aviation Group. It used the Potez 25 TOE for military use and the Curtiss Fledgling for training. The definitive deployment beyond Rio de Janeiro only occurred from 1933. Brazil's territory was divided into three military air zones. In 1937 there were already the 1st, 5th and 3rd Aviation Regiments, respectively in Campo dos Afonsos, Curitiba and Canoas, the nuclei of the 2nd, 6th and 7th regiments, in Campo de Marte, Fortaleza and Belém and a detachment in Pampulha. Each regiment should have two to four Aviation Groups, each group two to three squadrons, and each squadron two to five aircraft sections. Parallel to aviation, the army developed anti-aircraft artillery. At the end of its existence, Army Aviation had 330 aircraft. Along with the 99 naval aviation aircraft, the air fleet was heterogeneous, partly obsolete or out of service. The number of pilots and technicians and logistical capacity were insufficient to protect the country.

In 1931, the Military Air Mail was also created. By carrying civilian correspondence, it served to justify the military budget. For the aviators, it was a way to escape the "theoretical cylinder" of 10 km around the school in which most flights took place. It helped integrate the country, reaching many locations with poor communications and no road or rail access, in a decade when there was only one private airline in Brazil. In 1935, its lines already went from Rio Grande do Sul to Pará. After 1941, the mail was united with the Correio Aéreo Naval to form the Correio Aéreo Nacional.

== Operations and political participation ==
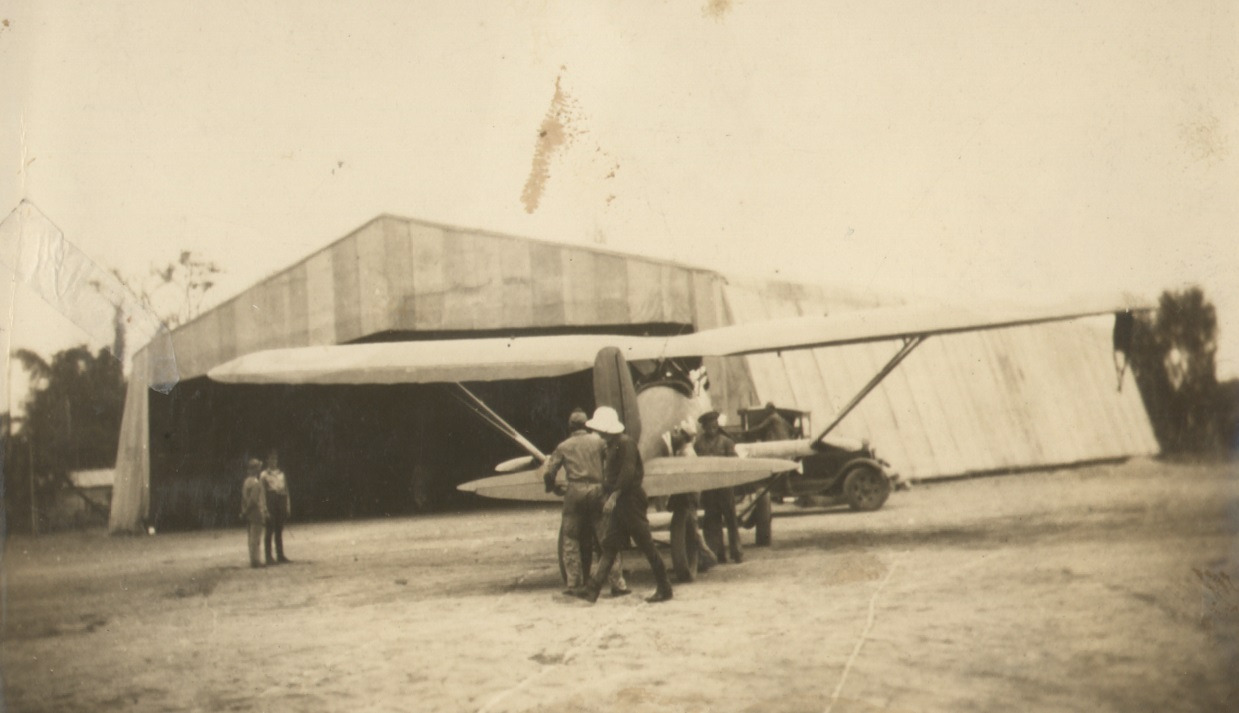
Hangar in Resende during the Constitutionalist Revolution

The Aviation School was involved in revolutionary movements. Some airmen sympathized with the Copacabana Fort revolt, but the school was occupied in advance by loyalists, who arrested several officers. Ten planes were used against the 1924 São Paulo Revolt, with two aviators being injured. In the subsequent Paraná Campaign, in 1925, another air detachment carried operations. In 1924 there were again arrests of pilots who sympathized with rebels. Fearing an attack, president Artur Bernardes paralyzed the aviation service. Its development only resumed after the end of Bernardes term, in 1926.

Military aviation was used by both sides of the Revolution of 1930, on a small scale, and again in the Constitutionalist Revolution of 1932, which was its first use on a considerable scale in Brazil, even though the number of planes was small. Army Aviation flew in support of loyalist ground forces in the Paraíba Valley and southern São Paulo and bombed cities in São Paulo. Four loyalist planes were hit on the ground by São Paulo aviation in Mogi-Mirim, and a loyalist pilot was killed by anti-aircraft fire in Casa Branca. Encounters with São Paulo aviation in the air were rare. In the 1935 Communist uprising, a revolt broke out in Campo dos Afonsos, but was suppressed by troops from Vila Militar. If they had taken off, the rebels could have caused serious damage. Instead, planes attacked the rebels of the 3rd Infantry Regiment.

== Incorporation into the Brazilian Air Force ==
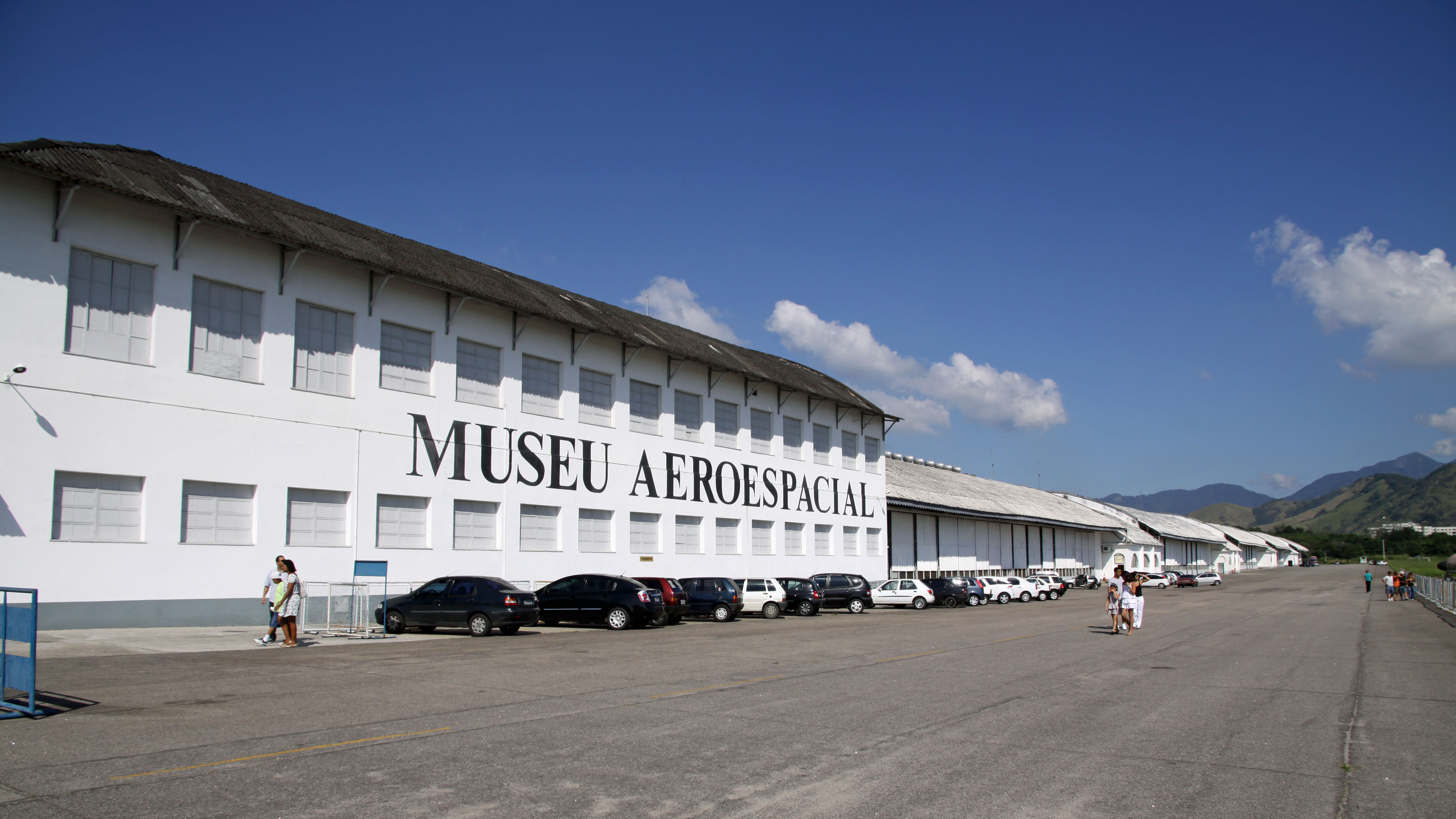
Campo dos Afonsos under the air force's administration

Army cadets who chose the new branch were few. At Campo dos Afonsos, they lost contact with the rest of the army and developed their own ethos, with values such as individualism, adventure and heightened courage. For the officers on land, the airmen were undisciplined. The disciplinary formalities, the environment and even the land clothing were not suitable for the aviation routine. The growing institutional autonomy in the navy and army distanced their aviators from their respective institutions, fueling the desire for their own force.

Since the 1930s, a movement led by civilians and military personnel defended the unification of army, naval and civil aviation into a single "Ministry of Air". They considered the existence of separate aviations to be a waste and were inspired by similar developments abroad, where aviation was becoming an independent branch of the Armed Forces, following the example of the French Air Force. Supporting and supported by Getúlio Vargas, they pressured the government and campaigned in the press. In 1941, with the creation of the Brazilian Air Force by a presidential decree, Army Aviation ceased to exist.

The creation of the air force also had political reasons, as it was a third weight in the balance between the army and the navy. With the beginning of the Second World War, patrol aviation on the coast, departing from bases in the northeastern salient, would gain prominence. The army did not want this to strengthen the navy's political power too much. The Chief of Staff of the Army and the Minister of War were surprised by the decree, but the army supported the decision, as did the Ministry of Transport and Public Works. Only the Ministry of the Navy was against it.

In 1986, the army, which intended to establish an airmobile force, was authorized to operate helicopters and recreate its organic aviation. In 2017, the army went further and planned the purchase of the Short C-23 Sherpa, which would be its first fixed-wing aircraft since 1941. However, due to the air force's objection, this initiative was interrupted in 2020.
