= Vila Militar =

- Neighbourhood
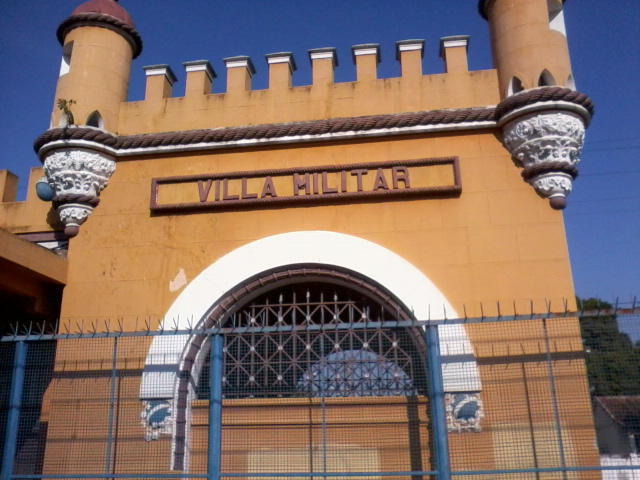

- Location in Rio de Janeiro Vila Militar (Brazil)
- Coordinates: 22°51′54″S 43°24′10″W
- Country: Brazil
- State: Rio de Janeiro (RJ)
- Municipality/City: Rio de Janeiro
- Zone: West Zone

Vila Militar is a planned neighbourhood located in the West Zone of the municipality of Rio de Janeiro, Brazil. Its construction began in 1904, driven by the need to renovate the facilities of the Military School of Realengo. The works were supervised by the then Minister of War, Marshal Hermes da Fonseca, during the presidencies of Rodrigues Alves and Afonso Pena, with support from Rio de Janeiro's mayor, Pereira Passos.

As of the year 2000, the Human Development Index (HDI) of Vila Militar was 0.856, ranking as the 50th highest among the 126 neighbourhoods of Rio de Janeiro.

== History ==
The origins of Vila Militar date back to 1904, when the Brazilian federal government identified the need to renovate the facilities of the Escola Militar. At the same time, a commission studied the overall reorganisation of the Brazilian Army, focusing on providing adequate space and infrastructure for practical training and military life. The project gained traction under President Rodrigues Alves and was overseen by Minister Hermes da Fonseca.

On 19 August 1907, a commission was appointed to oversee the construction of Vila Militar. Among its members was Lieutenant Colonel Antônio Leite de Magalhães Bastos, after whom the neighbouring Magalhães Bastos neighbourhood is named. Another notable figure was Manoel Guina, a Portuguese master builder who moved from São Paulo and became one of the area's early pioneers.

In 1908, the government purchased the Sapopemba farm, previously owned by Count Sebastião de Pinho, to enable the construction of the neighbourhood. That same year, work on the barracks commenced.

By 1911, the Aeroclube do Brasil (Brazilian Aeroclub), the country’s first aviation organisation, began operations in Vila Militar. It was founded by aviation enthusiasts, with Alberto Santos Dumont as its honorary president and Lieutenant Ricardo Kirk—one of Brazil's earliest licensed pilots—among its members. The aeroclub played a significant role in the neighbourhood’s expansion, eventually leading to the establishment of Brazil’s first airbase, located in Campo dos Afonsos.

Construction of the barracks and residential areas resumed in 1915, following the reorganisation of the Brazilian Army.

In the early 21st century, Vila Militar hosted key events such as the 2007 Pan American Games, the 2011 Military World Games, and the 2016 Summer Olympics, leading to the construction of the Deodoro Sports Complex. Despite its name, the complex is located in Vila Militar and was later opened to the public as the Parque Radical do Rio.

== Features and structure ==
Vila Militar is the neighborhood that houses the largest concentration of military personnel in Latin America, with over 60,000 servicemen and women. Of the 38 neighbourhoods in Rio’s West Zone, Vila Militar ranks 12th in terms of property value, attributed to its urban planning, public order, and high level of security. It is considered more valuable than its six neighbouring districts.

The neighbourhood features a safe, heavily patrolled, and well-forested environment, making it an ideal location for outdoor activities like skateboarding, cycling, walking, and running. A designated sports area spans 2.5 square kilometres.

Vila Militar also includes a small shopping centre, popularly referred to as “Toco” Shopping, which provides services such as a gym, banks, a bakery, and a pharmacy. It is located along Avenida Duque de Caxias, near the 1st Army Division headquarters.

The neighbourhood is part of the Realengo Administrative Region and borders the neighbourhoods of Deodoro, Campo dos Afonsos, Jardim Sulacap, Realengo, and Magalhães Bastos. It also shares a boundary with Ricardo de Albuquerque in the city’s North Zone.

Notable landmarks include two municipal schools—Escola Municipal Rosa da Fonseca and Escola Municipal Frei Orlando—as well as a train station with a distinctive castle-shaped building.
