= Campo dos Afonsos =

Campo dos Afonsos may refer to:

- Afonsos Air Force Base (Campo dos Afonsos), a Brazilian Air Force base
- Campo dos Afonsos, Rio de Janeiro, a district in Rio de Janeiro
