= Pedra do Sal =

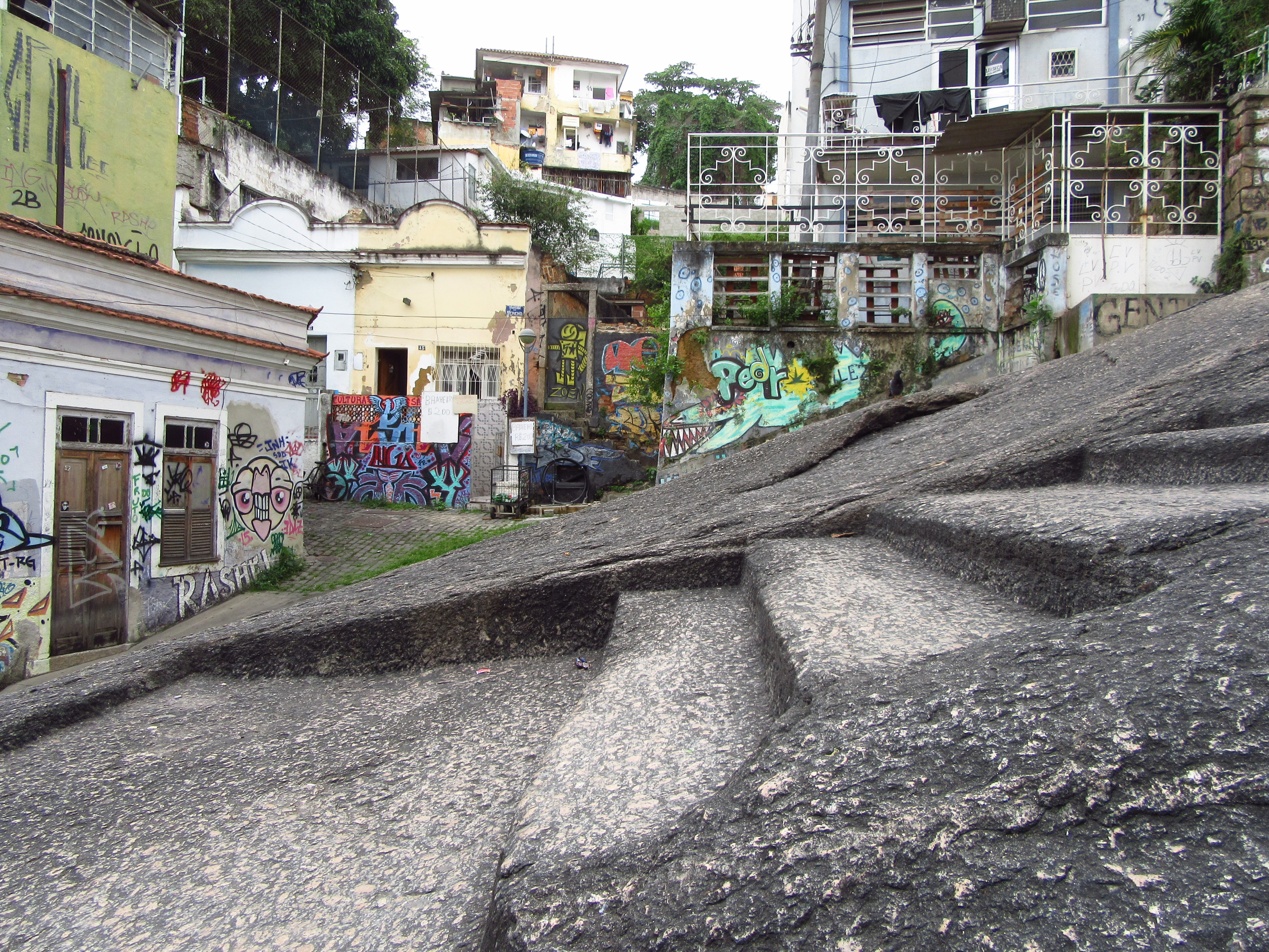
- Street in Pedra do Sal

- Location within Rio de Janeiro Location within Brazil
- 22.898010°S 43.185270°W
- Type: historic and religious site
- Location: Rio de Janeiro, Brazil

Pedra do Sal (English: "Rock of Salt") is a historic and religious site in Rio de Janeiro, in the neighborhood of Saúde. The site was originally a quilombo village. An association group still lives there, formally known as the Community Descendents of the Quilombos of Pedra do Sal (Portuguese: Comunidade Remanescentes de Quilombos da Pedra do Sal). The site was recognised in 1984 by INEPAC, the Institute for State Cultural Heritage (Instituto Estadual do Patrimônio Cultural).

Pedra do Sal is of special significance to residents of Rio de Janeiro of African descent. Additionally, it is a center of samba and choro music. Pedra do Sal is the center of the area known locally as "Little Africa", which originated in the collective houses of escaped and freed slaves. Great sambistas have played there, including Donga, João da Baiana, Pixinguinha and Heitor dos Prazeres.

== History ==
=== Circa 1608 ===
A group of migrants from Bahia moved to the Saúde area as where prices were cheap and the area was close to the port where the men could find work with cargo ships. The first large docks of Rio de Janeiro and warehouses were being built at this time, the alleys and streets extended to Pedra da Prainha, later known as Pedra do Sal, where there was a large slave market.

=== Circa 1817 ===
As the Bahian population was concentrated around Pedra do Sal, it became a meeting place of the neighborhood. It became a point of cultural reference for the black population. In fact, the Bahian colony had an important impact on all parts of Carioca life, with even leaders of the city visiting the terreiros of Candomblé and festivals in the area. The area gained a tradition of social cohesion, which influenced the whole heterogeneous community of the port.

The house of Candomblé belonging to João Alabá was one of the most important places for the Bahians, with many well-known Mães-de-Santos met here, such as Ciata, Bibiana, Mônica and Perciliana. These women gained respect for their central positions in the terreiros and for their participation in the local community, helping integrate African traditions into the city and expanding the cultural life of the city.

==== Aunt Ciata ====
The most famous and influential Mãe-de-Santo was Hilária Batista de Almeida, known as Aunt Ciata. She is mentioned in all reports about the early growth of samba Carioca and carnival groups. She was born in Salvador, Bahia in 1854, on the day of Saint Hilarius and arrived in Rio de Janeiro when she was 22. She fell in love with another Bahian, Norberto and had a daughter, Isabel. She was a confectioner, and sold her sweets on Rua da Carioca, always in Bahian traditional dress.

Later, Aunt Ciata lived with João Batista in a relationship that produced 15 children. A woman of great initiative and energy, she worked constantly and was a founder of the carioca tradition of Bahian "quituteiras" – traditionally clad, snack sellers and unofficial representatives of Bahian culture, including Afro-Brazilian religions. In the first half of the 19th century, she was mentioned in the book titled "Viagem Pitoresca e Histórica do Brasil" by Jean-Baptiste Debret. In the terreiro of João Alabá, Aunt Ciata was responsible for preparing offerings for her saint.

Aunt Ciata was the main creator and organisor of the ranchos of the Saúde area. She was one of those responsible for the change in the nature of the early Carnaval parades. Besides those involved in the ranchos, various undesirable types would take to the street in groups and often instigate violence. The Rio carnaval only shed its brutal image in the first half of the 19th century, becoming more festive and eventually with the creation of the modern samba schools.

== Location ==
The Saúde neighbourhood, in which Pedra do Sal is located, is in the 1st Administrative Region of Rio de Janeiro (Brazil), an area close to the central business district. Officially Saúde is between Praça Mauá and a Barão de Tefé, including the hill of Conceição e Valongo. However, locals consider that the real and historical boundary of the neighbourhood is Gamboa.
