= Hanging Garden of Valongo =

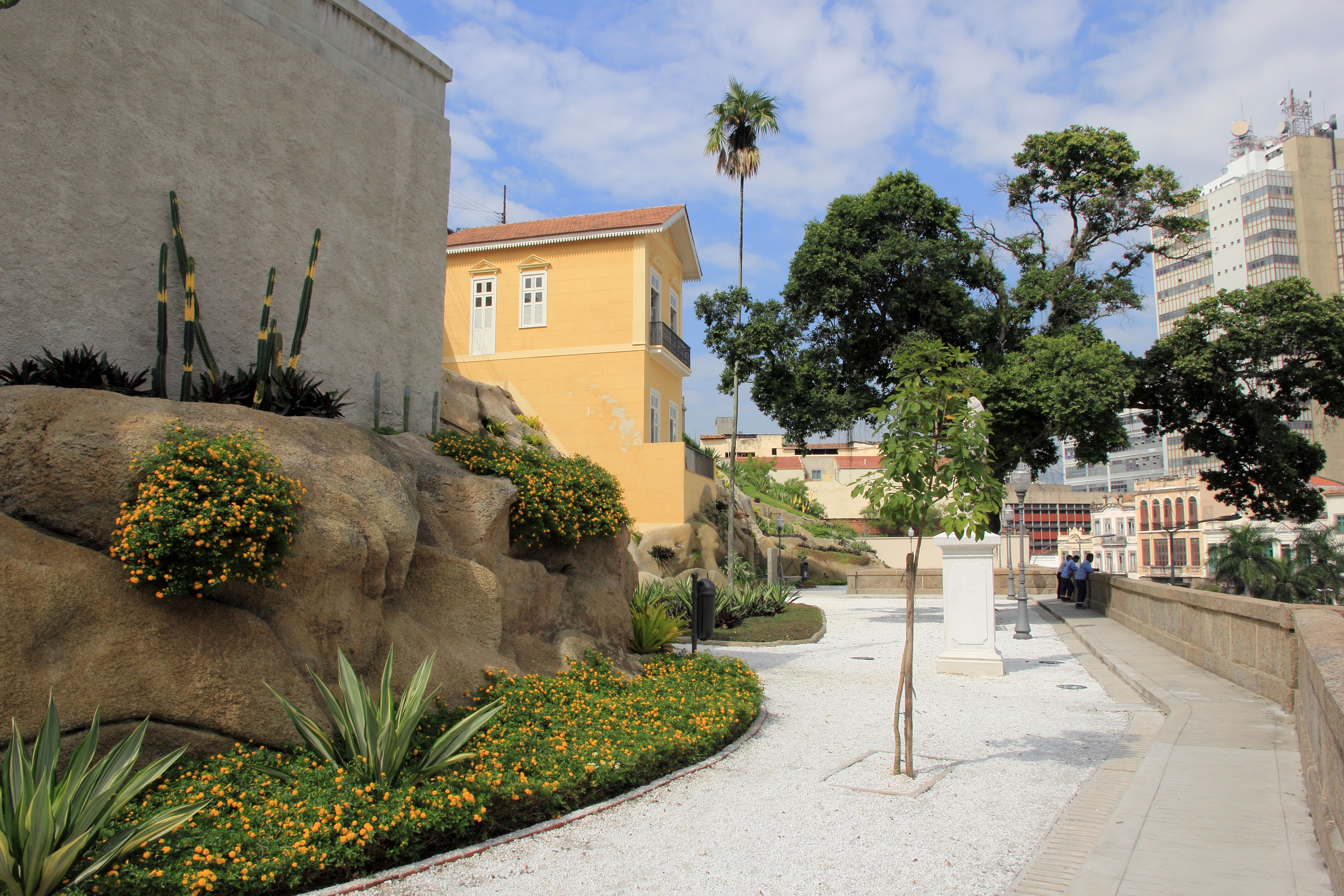
Jardim Suspenso do Valongo

The Hanging Garden of Valongo is a landscaped building located on the western slope of the Morro da Conceição, in the passage which has also been called Morro do Valongo, in the neighborhood of Saúde in the city of Rio de Janeiro, in Brazil. It was built in 1906 as part of a retaining wall during the works promoted by Mayor Pereira Passos. Its planning is the work of landscape architect Luis Rei. It sits 7 meters above street level.

Designed as a romantic garden, for the ride of society in the late afternoon, it contained terrace, walks, trees, gas burners, water tank for irrigation, flower beds and grass, rustic garden, home guard and tool shed and up even a waterfall. Access can be via stairs by Camerino Street.

There were, in the garden, four statues representing marble Roman deities: Minerva, Mercury, Ceres, and Mars. These statues were removed from the Empress of Pier Grandjean de Montigny, located near and that at the time, was in ruins. In 2002, the statues were partially damaged by vandals and the city decided to transfer them to the City Palace. Replicas of the originals were stored temporarily in Noronha Santos Park, at Avenida Presidente Vargas, next to the Headquarters Division Monuments and Fountains of Parks and Gardens Foundation. In June 2012, the replicas were replaced in the garden after its restoration, as part of the revitalization project of the region, Porto Maravilha.
