= Black Hall =

Country house in Devon, England

Coordinates: 50.4045°N 3.8125°W

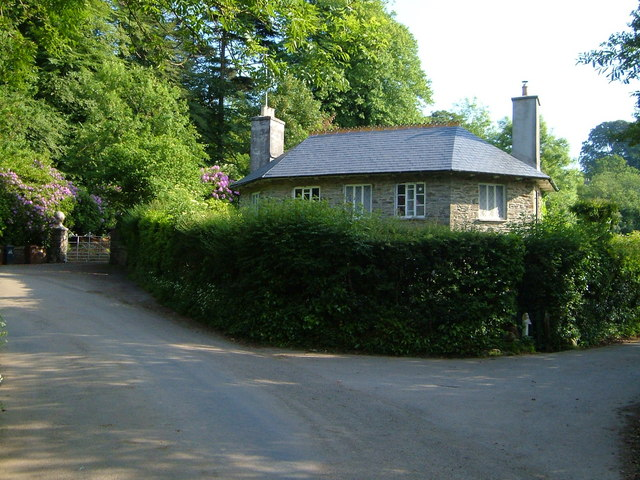
The Lodge to Black Hall

Black Hall is a Grade II* listed building near the village of Avonwick, in Devon, England.

Previously, an older construction of Black Hall was the seat of the Fowells of Fowellscombe Hall, which is now in ruins. In 1815 Black Hall, or Blakehall, was sold to local landowner Hubert Cornish (1770-1832), a lawyer and accomplished painter, who built the present house and landscaped the grounds. It was built around 1820, possibly by the London architect R. Brown. In 1881 the house was extended by Fredrick James Cornish Bowden, who constructed an additional servants' building to the west of the property, consisting of yellow brick with corbelled brick eaves, cornice, and a hipped slate roof. The current building is square in shape and faces south; it is three rooms deep and has two principal state rooms at the front. In the basement there are a kitchen and a bakehouse, as well as the servants' hall and dairy, which are at ground level at the back of the house due to the sloping ground. To the front of the building, a five bay façade has been installed with a pillared porch in the centre. The windows are 12-pane sash windows dating from the 19th century, and have wooden shutters on the inside.

The interior of the building has a fine oval staircase and hall with a mahogany handrail and balusters, and egg-and-dart mouldings on the walls and ceiling. The stairwell has an elliptical vault and moulded friezes and motifs. The house has a marble fireplace with detailed columns to either side. Another marble fireplace is in the dining room and dates from the Victorian era.

During World War Two, in 1940 Westerleigh Preparatory School St Leonard's on Sea in Sussex was evacuated to Black Hall, but returned to Sussex in 1944. Richard Mason (explorer) was a pupil at this time.
