= Saúde, Rio de Janeiro =

Saúde
- Neighborhood
- Location in Rio de Janeiro Saúde (Brazil)
- Coordinates: 22°53′40″S 43°11′12″W
- Country: Brazil
- State: Rio de Janeiro (RJ)
- Municipality/City: Rio de Janeiro
- Zone: Centro

Population (2021)
  - Total: 2,749

Saúde is a neighborhood of Rio de Janeiro, Brazil. Its population in 2000 was 2186. Located on the coast, just north of the historical centre in downtown Rio, west of Praça Mauá and east of Gamboa, Rio de Janeiro, it contains several notable hospitals such as Hospital dos Servidores de Estado and Hospital Pro Matre; the name Saúde means "Health" in Portuguese. It is marked by many homes for the lower middle class and numerous sheds, warehouses and depots are located in the region.

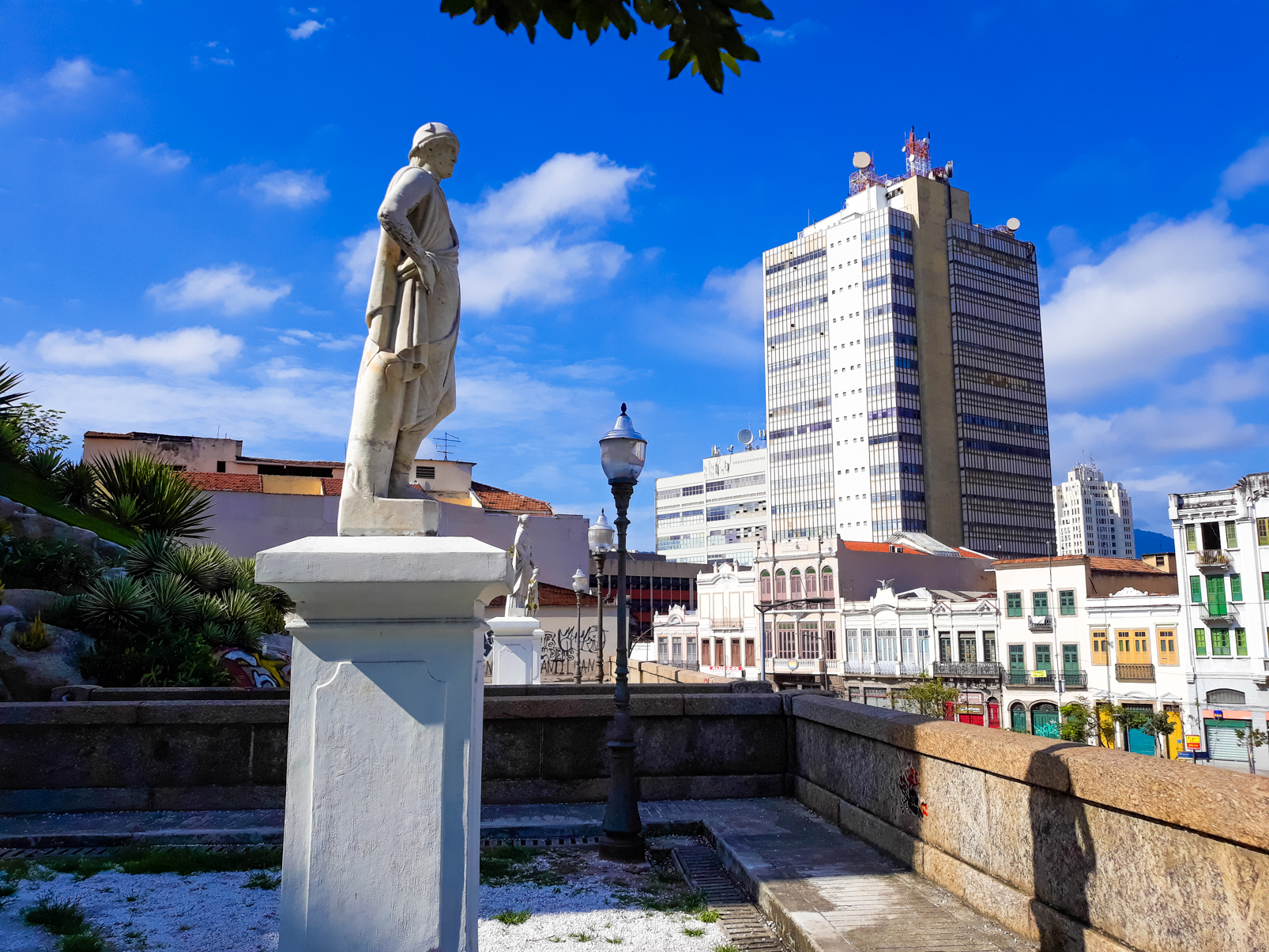
Valongo Suspended Garden in Saúde.

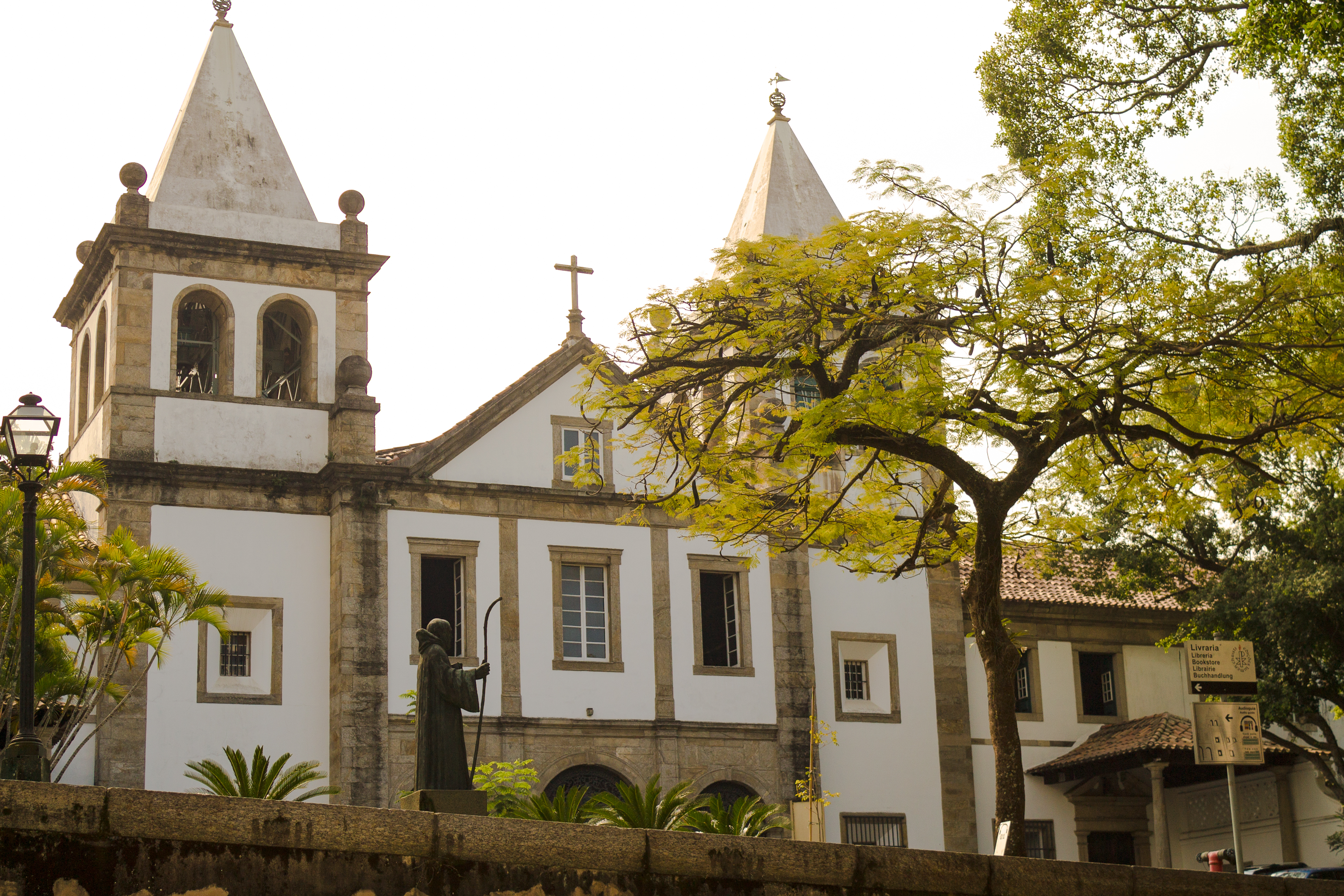
São Bento Monastery

The Church of Our Lady of Saúde was built in 1789 on the seafront and gave its name to the neighborhood of Saúde, although the church belongs, nowadays, to the neighborhood of Gamboa.

Pedra do Sal, a historic and religious site, is located within Saúde. The Community Descendents of the Quilombos of Pedra do Sal (Portuguese: Comunidade Remanescentes de Quilombos da Pedra do Sal) were recognized as a historic site in 1984 by INEPAC, the Institute for State Cultural Heritage (Instituto Estadual do Patrimônio Cultural).

== Notable landmarks ==
- Building of the 5th Military Police Battalion
- Coronel Assunção Square (Former Harmony Square)
- José Bonifácio Municipal Cultural Center building
- Archaeological Site Cemetery of New Black Slaves
- Children of Talma Theater Dramatic Society building
- Catholic Church of Our Lady of Health
- Catholic Church of Our Lady of Deliverance
- Federal College Pedro II Center Unit
- SAGAS Projects (Preservation of Buildings and Households-Health, Santo Cristo)
- Hanging Garden of Valongo
- Valongo Observatory
- Building of the Oceanographic Institute of the Brazilian Army
- Fortress of Morro da Conceicao
- Morro da Providencia Residential Complex
- Quilombola Archaeological Site of Pedra do Sal
- Catholic Church of San Francisco da Motta
- Residential and Commercial Complex of Largo da Prainha
- Largo Joao da Bahia
- Pedra do Sal Slave and Commercial Warehouse
- Stone Carved Staircases of Pedra do Sal
- Chapel of Souls in Morro da Providência
- Bandstand at Praça da Harmonia
- Historical Statues of Praça Coronel Assunção
- Villa Regia Hotel
