= Cemitério dos Ingleses, Gamboa =

English cemetery in Gamboa, Rio de Janeiro

British Cemetery Gamboa
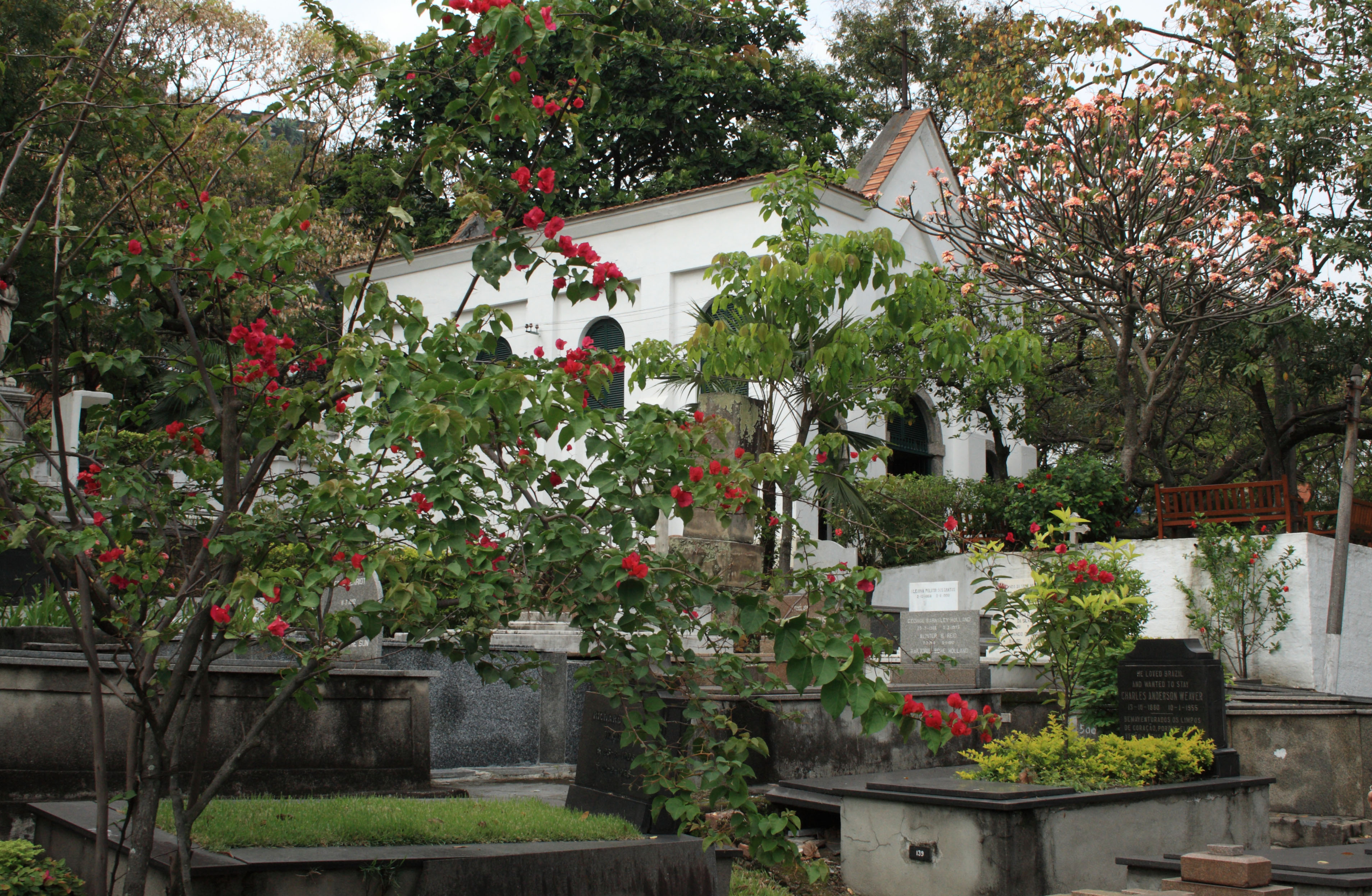
- Cemitério dos Ingleses Gamboa
- Interactive map of British Cemetery Gamboa

Details
- Established: 1811
- Location: Gamboa, Rio de Janeiro
- Country: Brazil
- Coordinates: 22°54′S 43°12′W
- Type: British
- No. of graves: >3,000
- Website: Cemetery details. Commonwealth War Graves Commission.

The Cemitério dos Ingleses, Gamboa is a cemetery in Gamboa, Rio de Janeiro in Brazil. It is also known as the English Cemetery or the British Cemetery Gamboa.

== History ==
John VI of Portugal ceded two and a half acres of land near the shore of Guanabara Bay to the British in 1809. The British Ambassador to the Emperor's court (Percy Smythe, 6th Viscount Strangford), founded the cemetery. The first burial was in 1811.

There are 8 World War I and 4 World War II Commonwealth war graves in the cemetery.

== Location ==
The cemetery is located in Rua da Gamboa, in the neighborhood of Gamboa, Rio de Janeiro.
