= Gamboa, Rio de Janeiro =

Gamboa
- Neighborhood
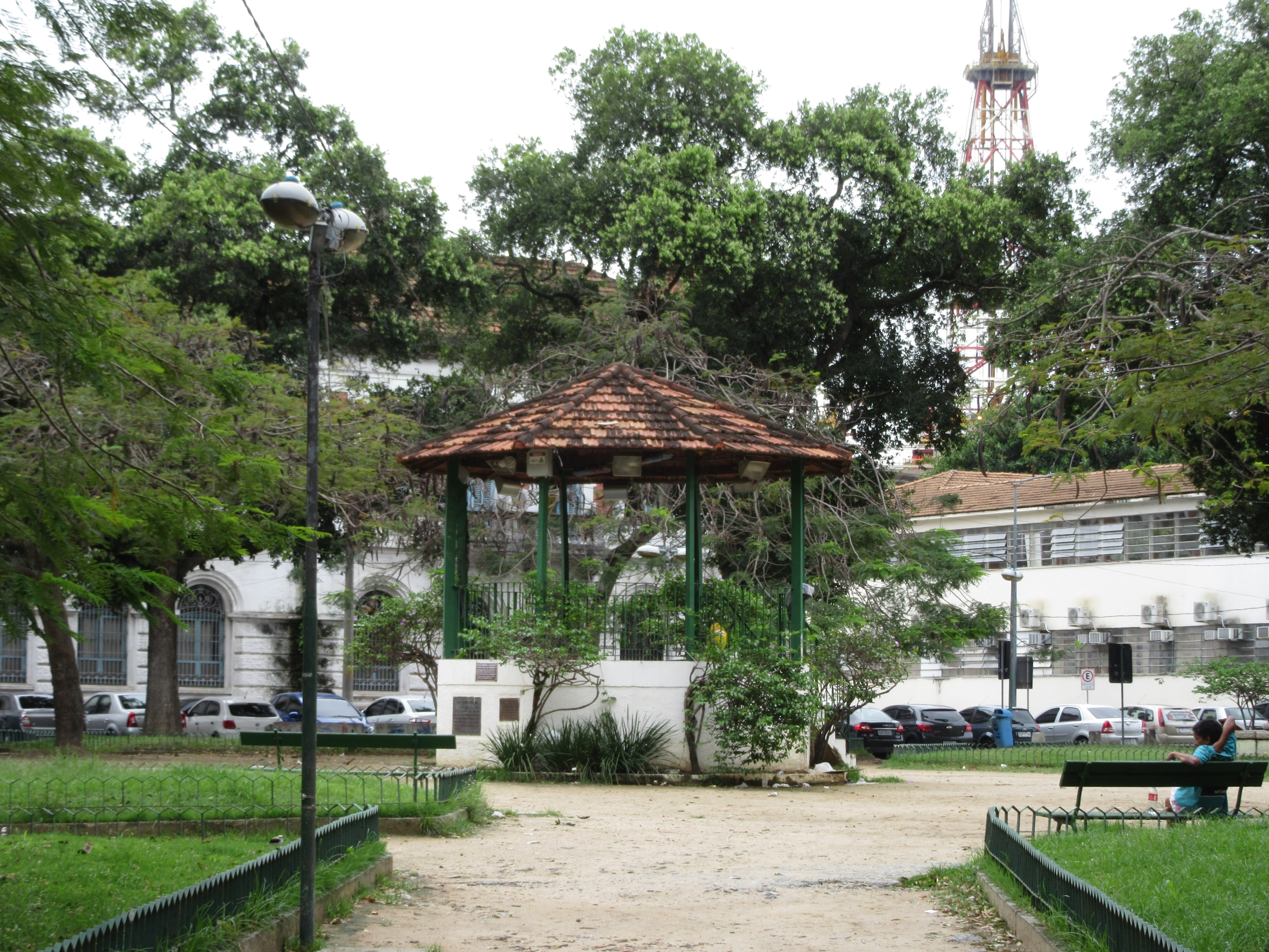

- Location in Rio de Janeiro Gamboa (Brazil)
- Coordinates: 22°53′51″S 43°11′34″W
- Country: Brazil
- State: Rio de Janeiro (RJ)
- Municipality/City: Rio de Janeiro
- Zone: Centro

Gamboa is a neighborhood in Rio de Janeiro, Brazil. Gamboa, along with Santo Cristo and Saúde, is one of the oldest boroughs of Rio. It was originally settled by the aristocracy, due to the attractive position on the shores of Guanabara Bay, but lost its glamour when the docks were built. Along with this history, the area also hosts The English Cemetery at Gamboa, one of the oldest British institutions in Rio.

In 1809, Dom João VI ceded to the British two and a half acres of farmland along the shore of the bay. Lord Strangford, British Ambassador to the Emperor's court, founded the cemetery, and the first burial took place in 1811.
