= Campo dos Afonsos, Rio de Janeiro =

Campo dos Afonsos
- Neighborhood
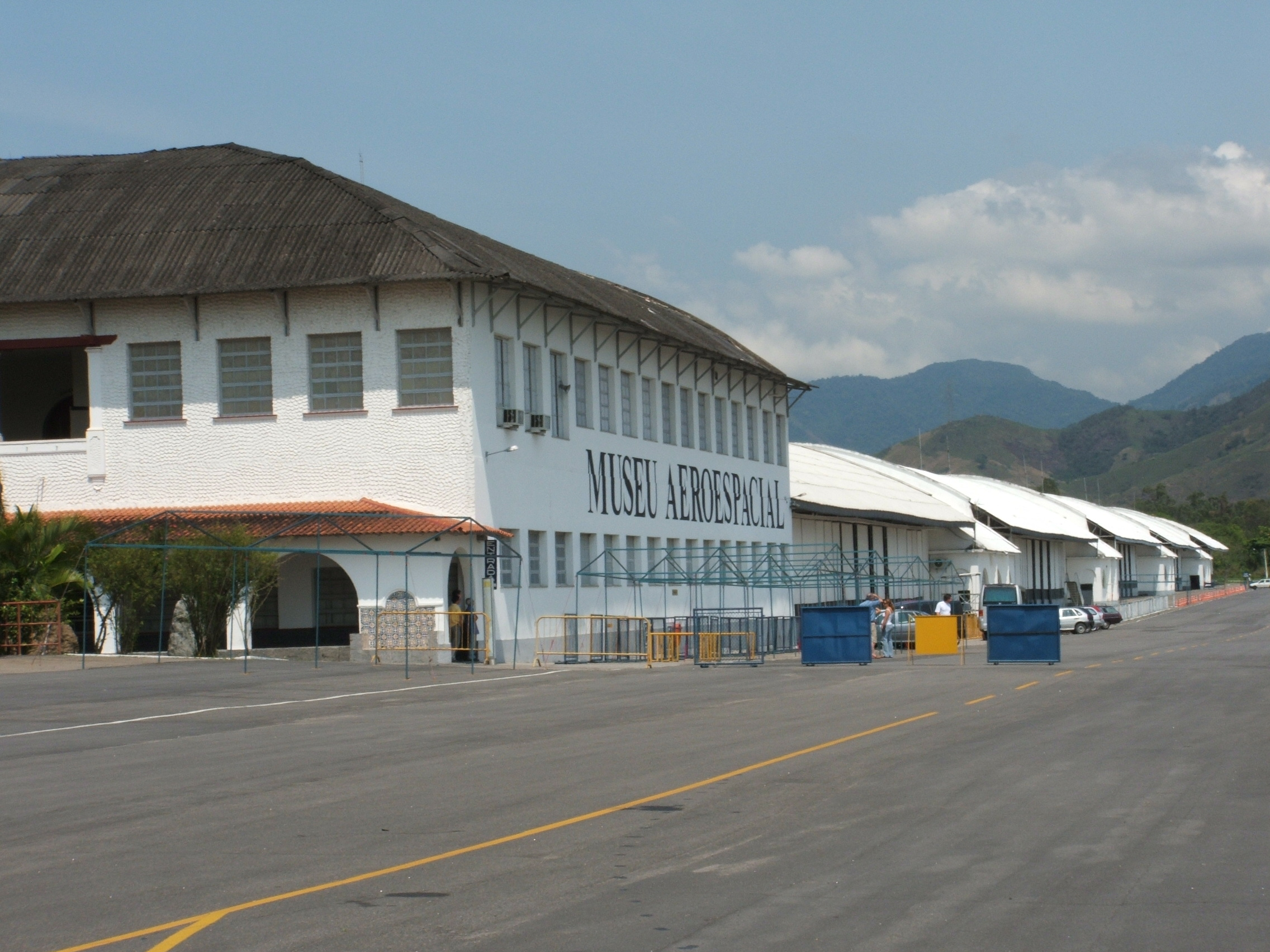

- Location in Rio de Janeiro Campo dos Afonsos (Brazil)
- Coordinates: 22°52′33″S 43°22′49″W
- Country: Brazil
- State: Rio de Janeiro (RJ)
- Municipality/City: Rio de Janeiro
- Zone: West Zone

Population (2022)
  - Total: 2,106

Campo dos Afonsos is a neighborhood in the West Zone of Rio de Janeiro, Brazil.
