= Ricardo Kirk =

First Brazilian Army Aviator

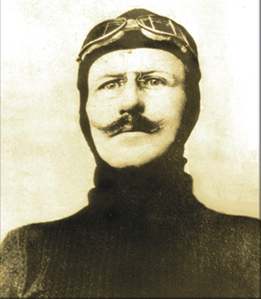
- Born: 1874; Campos dos Goytacazes, Rio de Janeiro, Empire of Brazil
- Died: 1 March 1915 (aged 40–41) General Carneiro, Contestado Region, Paraná, Brazil
- Allegiance: Brazil
- Branch: Brazilian Army
- Service years: 1891–1915
- Rank: Captain
- Conflicts: Contestado War

Ricardo Kirk (1874 – 1 March 1915) was the first Brazilian Army Aviator. Kirk was born in Campos dos Goytacazes, Rio de Janeiro state, Brazil. In 1891 he entered the Military Academy and he was promoted to ensign in November 1893 and to first-lieutenant in March 1898 and posthumously to captain in 1915.

He is considered the Brazilian Army Aviation Patron.

== History ==
Kirk was the first Brazilian Army officer to learn how to pilot airplanes. He graduated from École d’Aviation d’Étampes (France) on 22 October 1912. When he returned to Brazil, he was one of the founders of the Brazilian Airclub, where he was assigned as technical director.

=== The crash ===
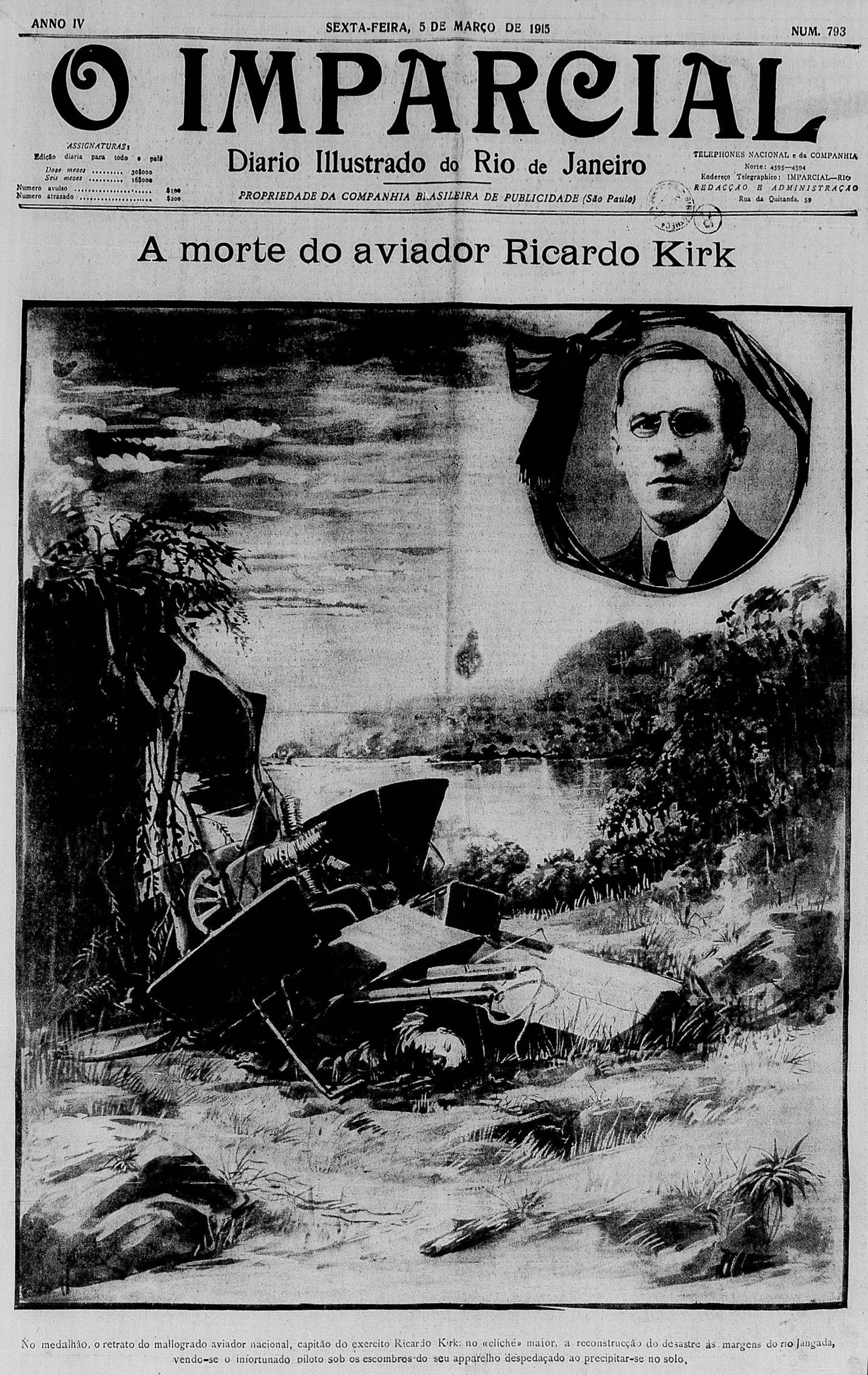
A reconstruction of Kirk's plane crash near Jangada River. published in O Imparcial, No. 793, 5 March 1915

When the Contestado War broke out on the borders of the states Paraná and Santa Catarina, Lt Ricardo Kirk was convened by General Setembrino de Carvalho to conduct air operations in support of land operations, which meant flying reconnaissance missions. Three monoplanes were dispatched to the area of conflict under the command of Lieutenant Ricardo Kirk, with one of the other airmen being the Italian civilian Ernesto Darioli. They were stationed at União da Vitória aviation field. The three aircraft, plus one that had been destroyed in a confrontation between Rio de Janeiro and União da Vitória, were the remainder of the "Brazilian School of Aviation" fleet, which had operated from Afonsos field, Rio de Janeiro, in 1914.

During one of the reconnaissance missions on 1 March 1915 near General Carneiro in the state of Santa Catarina, Kirk had a mechanical failure leading to a serious accident in which Kirk was killed (26.414054°S 51.291261°W). The weather conditions at the time of the accident were bad and the visibility was poor.

=== The monument ===
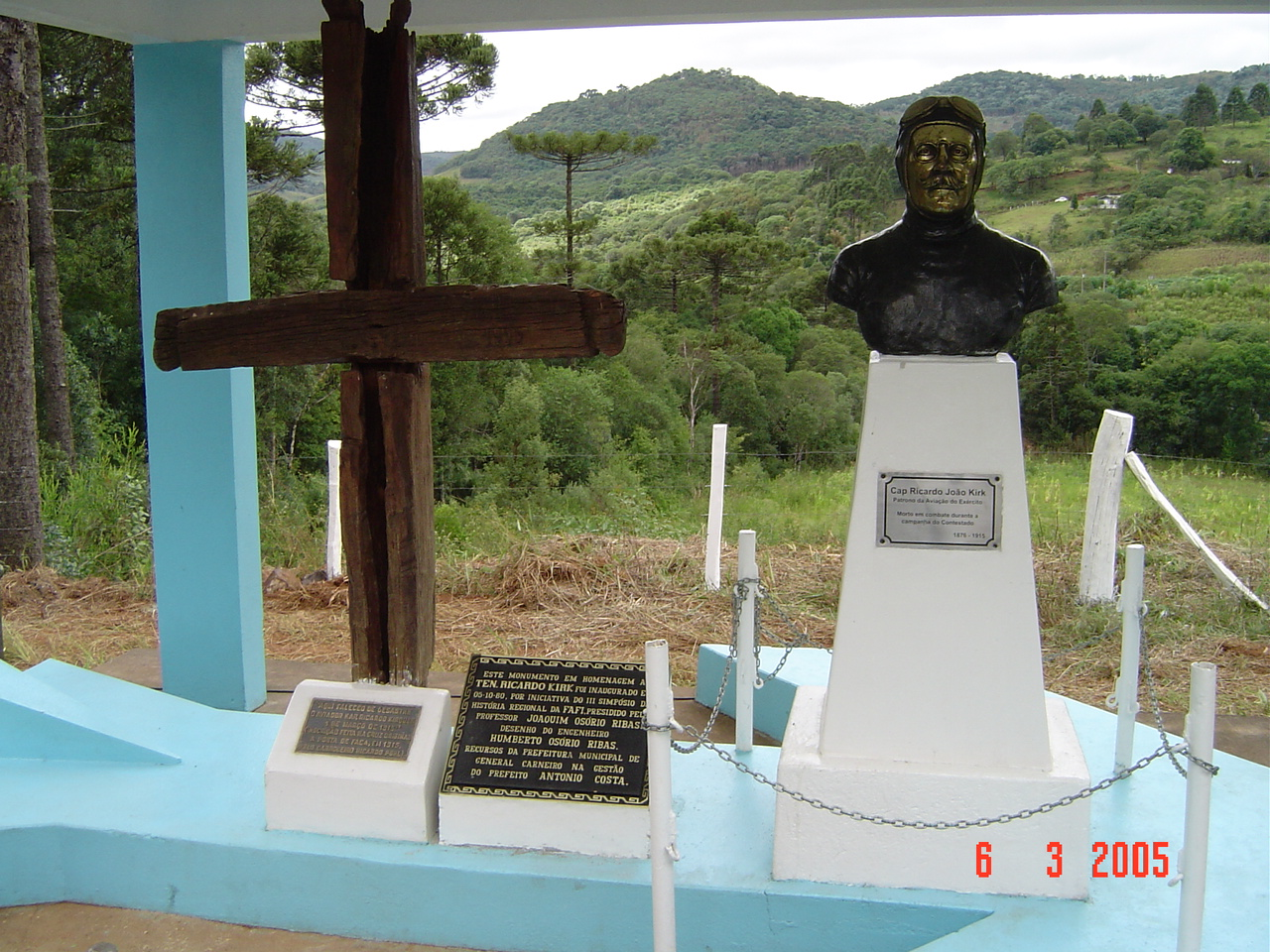
Captain Ricardo Kirk's bust next to the original wooden cross in General Carneiro, Paraná

On the site of the accident, a monument named "The Aviator Cross" was erected. Originally, it consisted only of a wooden cross, made by farmers who had helped the injured airman using sleepers of the Contestado Railroad with the name of Kirk carved in it with a knife. On 5 October 1980 another monument was inaugurated around the cross by the city of General Carneiro. It consists of a reinforced concrete structure symbolising Kirk's plane. On 10 March 2002 the Command of the Brazilian Army Aviation had a bronze bust of Ricardo Kirk erected at the spot.

In October 1943, the remains of Lieutenant Kirk were moved to the Mausoleum of Aviadores in São João Batista cemetery in Rio de Janeiro. In 1996 they were interred in a monument in his honour, built by the Command of the Army Aviation in Taubaté.

In the northeastern corner of Afonsos Field, one of the most important Brazilian Air Force bases, a hill is named in honour of the precursor of the military aviation, Ricardo Kirk.

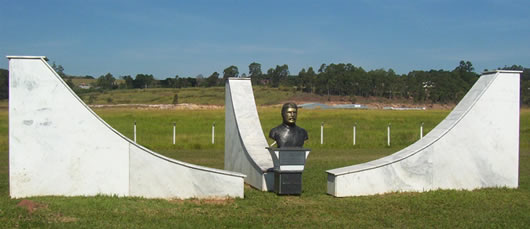
Monument to Ricardo Kirk in Taubaté, São Paulo
