= EXB =

EXB or Ex B can refer to:

- Brazilian Army Aviation, the part of the Brazilian Army responsible for helicopters, by ICAO airline code; see List of airline codes#B
- Ex Battalion, a Filipino hip hop collective also known as "Ex B"
- Expanded Bible, a translation of the Bible into English offering alternate translations; see List of English Bible translations
