= Operation Traira =

Brazilian army action against FARC guerillas

Operation Traíra
- Part of the Colombian conflict and war on drugs
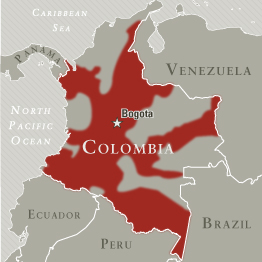
- Former areas of operation of the FARC
Date	February–March, 1991
Location	Amazonas state, Taraíra River in Brazilian-Colombian border.
Result	Guerrilla attack on the Brazilian Army border post on February 26. Immediate and decisive response from the Brazilian government.: Operation in response by the Brazilian Armed Forces with support from the Colombian government.; Successful Brazilian military operation.

Belligerents
Brazil: Brazilian Army; Brazilian Air Force; Brazilian Navy; Colombia: Colombian Army	FARC: Comando Simón Bolívar

Commanders and leaders
Fernando Collor; Carlos T. R. Gomes; Antenor de Santa Cruz; César Gaviria	Unknown

Strength
Brazil: Special Operations Brigade; 1st Jungle Infantry Battalion; Army Aviation Command; 16 helicopters 6 AT-27 Tucano Colombia: 1 infantry battalion	200 guerrillas (40 guerrillas entered Brazilian territory)

Casualties and losses
Brazil: Before the operation: 3 killed 9 wounded Colombia: unknown	62+ killed (12 dead in Brazilian territory); 150+ wounded & captured
- 2 civilians killed

Operation Traíra was the response of the Brazilian Armed Forces, with support from the Colombian Army, to an attack on their detachment on the bank of the Traíra River by FARC in February 1991.

== Background ==
The Traíra Detachment had been established in May 1990, 300 miles north of Tabatinga on the Traíra River, which forms part of the border between Brazil and Colombia. Its purpose was to confront the lawless situation in the region caused by the presence of illegal Brazilian and Colombian gold miners. It was under the command of the then 1st Border Command of the 1st Special Border Battalion, Tabatinga. Their mission was to maintain law and order by deporting Colombian miners and stopping Brazilian miners from entering the area.

== Guerrilla incursion ==
On February 26, 1991, a group of 40 guerrillas of the Revolutionary Armed Forces of Colombia, who called itself the "Simón Bolívar Command", crossed the border from Colombia to Brazil and raided the Traíra detachment of the Brazilian Army, which was in semi-permanent installations and had only 17 troops, less than the attacking guerrilla column. The action is regarded as the first attack on Brazilian soil since the 1864 invasion on Dourados during the Paraguayan War.

The attack began during lunch time when the guerrillas first shot the two armed sentinels on duty, killing them at the same time with sniper shots. Then two different groups of attackers advanced on the compound while a third group provided cover fire. It was later revealed that the guerrillas had been in contact with two women who had been detained by the garrison previously for an investigation but were subsequently released. The two women, who were present at the time of the attack, helped the guerrillas identify key targets in the compound, resulting in a very effective attack.

Intelligence operations claim that the attack was motivated by repression by the border detachment of illegal mining in the region, one of FARC's funding sources. During the attack three Brazilian soldiers died and nine were injured. Two illegal Colombian miners who were detained at the camp also died. Various weapons, ammunition and equipment were stolen, and the radios used for communications were destroyed.

The compound was very isolated, and now, completely cut off from headquarters communications. It was not until three days later, when a new detachment arrived to relieve the personnel on duty, that the attack became known to the Brazilian Army.

== Military response ==
Immediately the Brazilian Armed Forces, authorized by President Fernando Collor de Mello and with the knowledge and support of Colombian President César Gaviria, secretly unleashed Operation Traíra, in order to recover the stolen arms and discourage further attacks.

=== Brazilian Air Force ===
The Brazilian Air Force supported Operation Traíra with six transport helicopters H-1H, six ground attack aircraft AT-27 Tucano and C-130 Hercules and C-115 Buffalo logistics support aircraft.

=== Brazilian Navy ===
The Brazilian Navy supported the Traíra operation with a river patrol ship and an aircraft, based in Vila Bittencourt, cooperating with the logistical support and ensuring the security of the region.

=== Brazilian Army ===
The Brazilian Army sent the 1st Battalion of Special Forces and the 1st Commando, as well as soldiers from the 1st Battalion of Special Border Operations (1st BEF, now known as 8th Battalion of Jungle Infantry), to attack the guerrilla base that was in Colombian territory, near the border. They were also supported by soldiers of the 1st Jungle Infantry Battalion, the main unit of the Amazon Military Command. The Army Aviation Command was present by providing the means of transport used by the combatants employed in the mission, four Eurocopter AS565 Panther transport helicopters and two armed reconnaissance Eurocopter AS350 Écureuil helicopters.

=== Colombian Army ===
The Colombian Army supported the Traíra operation with the battalion Bejarano Muñoz, which is believed to have blocked the escape route of the guerrillas if they tried to escape the Brazilian Army attack.

== Aftermath ==
The balance of operation Traíra was sixty-two guerrillas killed, more than one hundred captured, and most weapons and equipment being recovered. Since then, there were neither raids of the FARC in Brazil, nor attacks on Brazilian military.
