= 1º Batalhão de Ações de Comandos =

1st Commando Actions Battalion
- 1º Batalhão de Ações de Comandos
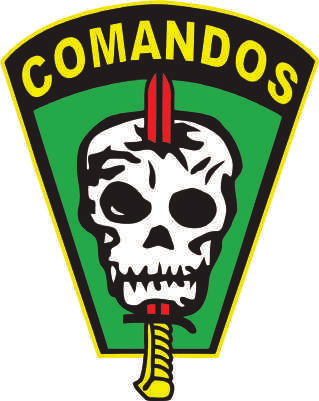
- Coat of arms of the 1 BAC
- Active: 1983; 43 years ago
- Country: Brazil
- Branch: Brazilian Army
- Type: Special Operations Forces
- Size: Unknown
- Part of: Brazilian Special Operations Brigade
- Garrison/HQ: Goiânia
- Nickname: "Caveiras" (Skulls)
- Mottos: Máximo de confusão, morte e destruição na retaguarda profunda do inimigo (English: "Maximum confusion, death and destruction in the enemy's deep rearguard")
- Engagements: Araguaia Guerrilla War; Operation Traira; United Nations Stabilisation Mission in Haiti; Security operations in Rio de Janeiro

The 1º Batalhão de Ações de Comandos (1º BAC) (English: 1st Commando Actions Battalion), also known as Capitão Francisco Padilha Battalion, is a special forces unit of the Brazilian Army.

== History ==
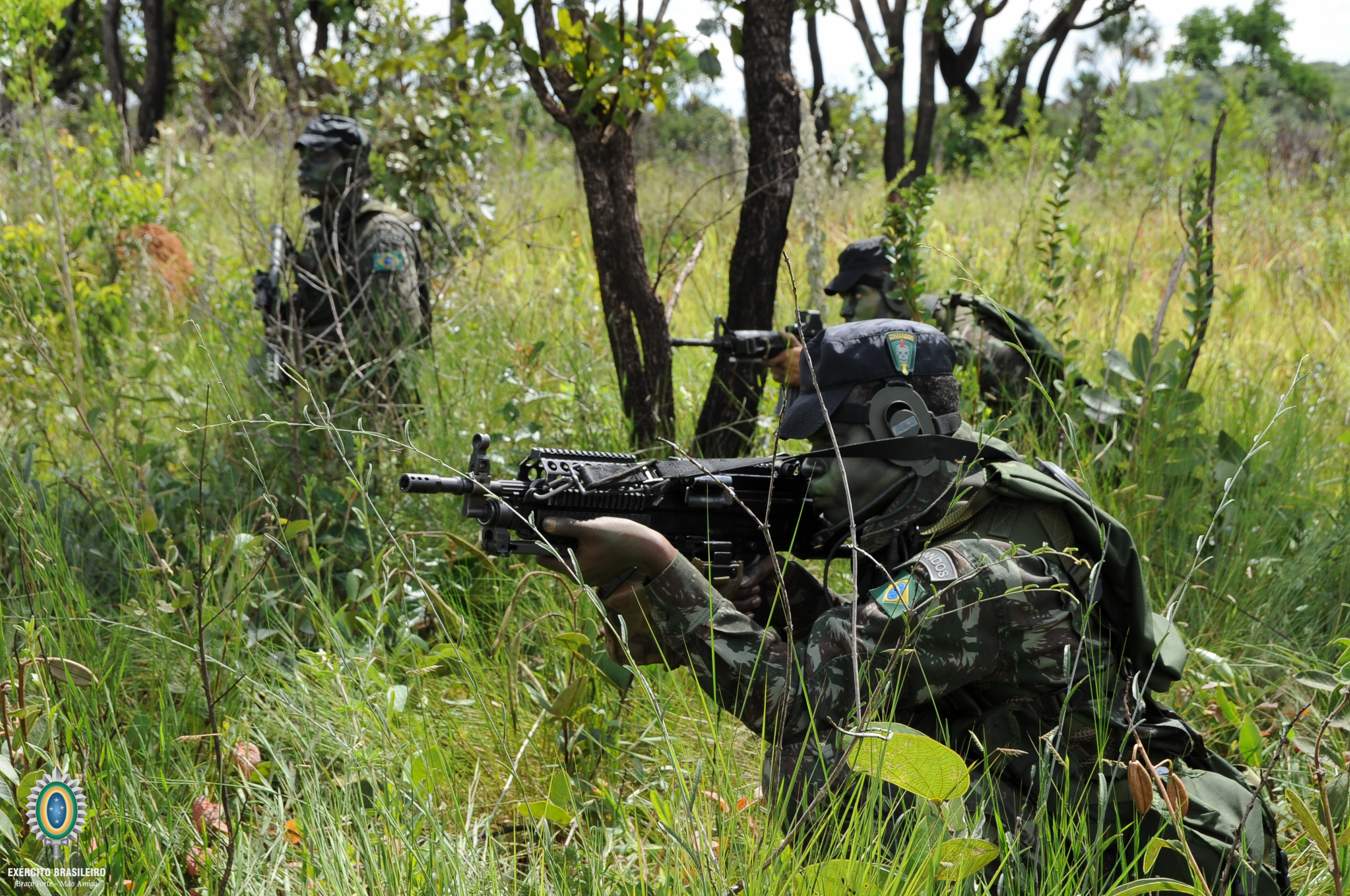
Comandos servicemen in training, 2011

Brazilian Special Operations Forces trace their history back to the Pernambucan Insurrection of the 17th century, when Portuguese-Brazilian fighters such as António Dias Cardoso and Captain Francisco Padilha, leading irregular forces and using guerrilla tactics, led a series of successful ambushes against the Dutch occupiers in the region. The irregulars succeeded in killing commanders such as Johan van Dorth, thus having a decisive role in halting the Dutch advance inland. The Commando Actions unit was created in 1983, first as a company-sized element subordinate to the 1st Special Forces Battalion and later being added to its own separate battalion.

During MINUSTAH, a force of around 20 men from the 1st Special Forces Battalion and 1st Commando Actions Battalion made up the Destacamento de Operações de Paz (Peace Operations Detachment) or Dopaz, a special operations unit responsible for high-risk missions such as special reconnaissance and direct action against leaderships of Haitian gangs, as well as leading the UN raids on neighbourhoods such as Bel Air, Cité Militaire and Cité Soleil from 2005 to 2007. According to Brazilian SF General Sergio Schwingel, Dopaz's role in Haiti led to the UN creating a doctrine for the usage of special forces in peacekeeping operations worldwide.
