= General Carneiro =

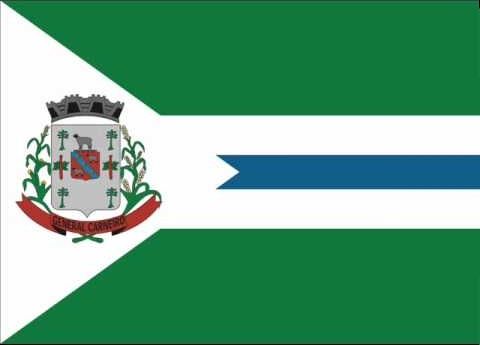
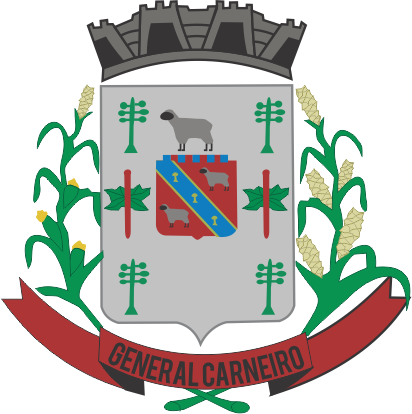
- Flag Coat of arms
- Nickname: Galbé
- Location of General Carneiro
- Coordinates: 26°25′40″S 51°18′57″W
- Country: Brazil
- Region: South
- State: Paraná
- Founded: November 19

Government
  - Mayor: Joel Ricardo Martins Ferreira (PSDB)

Area
  - Total: 1,070.252 km^{2} (413.227 sq mi)
- Elevation: 983 m (3,225 ft)

Population (2020)
  - Total: 13,685
  - Density: 12.787/km^{2} (33.117/sq mi)
- Time zone: UTC−3 (BRT)
- ZIP Code: 84660000
- HDI (2000): 0.711 – medium
- Website: www.generalcarneiro.pr.gov.br

General Carneiro is a Brazilian municipality located in the extreme south of the state of Paraná. According to the census carried out by the IBGE in 2010, its population is 13,667 inhabitants.

== History ==
The historical origins of the municipality of General Carneiro are linked to the discovery of Campos de Palmas. The Poles and Ukrainians caused great development in the region. João Humhevicz, Thomas Gaiovicz, Simão Gaiovicz, Simão Nicolen, Onofre Gaiovicz and José Dralrtk, with their respective families, were pioneers who left their names engraved in regional history.

By Decree No. 281, of August 13, 1901, the Police District in Colonia General Carneiro was created. The colony's name was a tribute paid to General Antônio Ernesto Gomes Carneiro, who died on the front of the battle, on February 10, 1894, as commander of the legal forces, besieged in the city of Lapa (January 15 to 11 February 1894), State of Paraná, during the Federalist Revolution.

State Law No. 2,466, of April 2, 1927, transferred the seat of the District of General Carneiro to the place called “Iratim”. Thus flourished the District of Iratim. In 1958, the District of São José de Palmas was created, headquartered in Passo da Galinha. This town had a strong growth. On January 25, 1961, by Law No. 4,339, São José de Palmas was elevated to the category of municipality, but with the name changed to General Carneiro, dismembering from the territory of the municipality of Palmas.

== Geography ==
=== Weather ===
Being in a valley relief, favorable to the accumulation of cold air, General Carneiro is one of the coldest municipalities in Paraná, and since April 30, 2008, when the INMET meteorological station was installed, it has been recording the lowest temperatures in that state. The climate is subtropical temperate Cfb type, according to the Köppen-Geiger climate classification. It has a rainfall in the wettest quarter of approximately 173.9 mm and in the period when there is less rain of 102.7 mm quarterly. The annual average can reach 1,700 mm.

According to the National Institute of Meteorology (INMET), the lowest temperature recorded in General Carneiro was −7.9 °C on July 20, 2021, and the highest reached 35.1 °C on October 2, 2020, during a strong heat wave.

The city was, at times, the coldest in the state. Having the occurrence of snow in a few years.

=== Geology ===
The municipality of General Carneiro is located geomorphologically in the Third Plateau of Paraná, this represents the slope that forms the slope of the Serra Geral do Paraná escarpment, being called Serra da Boa Esperança, or Mesozoic escarpment. This scarp is made up of strata of São Bento Sandstone or Botucatu Sandstones, with thick flows of very compact basaltic lavas from the Paraná trap, which on the slope of the scarp only show thicknesses from 50 to 200 m, reaching however further to the West, 1,100 m to 1,750 m .

=== Hidrography ===
The city has two main rivers that are part of the Middle Iguaçu Basin, they are the Jangada River and the Iratim River. The Jangada River is almost 100 km long and its main tributaries are the Faria, São Manoel and Pouso Bonito/Tourino rivers, the latter being almost entirely within the urban perimeter. The 57 km long River Iratim has as its main tributaries the River Lajeado Grande and the River Goiabeira.

=== Localization ===
It is located in the extreme south of Paraná, the third plateau in Paraná. It is at 26º25'39" south latitude and 51º18'56" west longitude, being at an altitude of 983 meters. The nearest urban centers are União da Vitória at 52 km, Porto Vitória at 47 km, Bituruna at 66 km, Palmas at 100 km and Caçador at 106 km. The distance to the capital Curitiba is 274 km.

The municipality of General Carneiro belongs to the Association of Municipalities of Southern Paraná (AMSULPAR), together with the cities of Antônio Olinto, Bituruna, Cruz Machado, Mallet, Paula Freitas, Paulo Frontin, Porto Vitória and União da Vitória.

=== Relief ===
With a very rugged relief, undulating to mountainous, as in approximately 80% of the municipality, the area serves almost only for the cultivation of pine.

=== Soils ===
In general, the soils in the municipality are good, deep and with accentuated acidity and medium fertility, of difficult mechanization due to a typical topography of the beginning of the Third Plateau of Paraná, which is characterized by its rugged aspect.

=== Vegetation ===
The average altitude of the headquarters is around 981 m, reaching almost 1,300 m in the locality of Iratim, which favors the vegetation predominantly of Araucaria in its original formation. The rest is due to the existence of exotic trees such as pine. It also features forest areas in the urban perimeter.
