= Brazilian Army Aviation =

- Aviação do Exército
- Brazilian Army Aviation patch
- Active: 1919–1941, 3 September 1986–present
- Country: Brazil
- Type: Army aviation
- Size: 95 helicopters
- Part of: Brazilian Army
- Garrison/HQ: Taubaté
- Patron: Ricardo Kirk

Commanders
- Commander: Brigade General Evandro Luis Amorim Rocha

Aircraft flown
- Attack: AS550N
- Reconnaissance: AS550N, AS 365 K
- Trainer: HB 350 L1
- Transport: AS 365 K, AS 532 UE, EC725 Super Cougar

The Brazilian Army Aviation (Portuguese: Aviação do Exército; AvEx) is the air segment of the Brazilian Army, operating rotary-wing aircraft (helicopters) in conjunction with surface forces such as the 12th Light Infantry Brigade (Airmobile). Originally founded with aircraft in 1919, it ceased to exist in 1941, re-emerging in its current form in 1986. It has mainly transport aircraft in addition to light attack helicopters, but does not use dedicated attack helicopters. Its command (CAvEx) in Taubaté, São Paulo, is linked to the Land Operations Command, in Brasília, and the Southeastern Military Command. CAvEx only has subordinates in the 1st and 2nd battalions, also in Taubaté. The 3rd and 4th are respectively in Campo Grande and Manaus, subordinate to the Western and Amazonian Military Commands, and there is a detachment in Belém, in the Northern Military Command.

The original Army Aviation, based on fixed-wing aircraft, became the army's fifth branch in 1927, but was united with Naval Aviation in 1941 to form the Brazilian Air Force (FAB). Later, the Brazilian Army recreated aviation with a new military technology, helicopters. There had been interest since the 1960s, but army aviation only returned in the 1980s, when it was the star of the modernization program, "Land Force 90", requiring heavy investments and the training of highly specialized workforce. As part of the army's "core of modernity", AvEx was protected from budget cuts in the following decade and became a strategic force, capable of rapid mobilization to any part of Brazil. Precisely for this reason it was created in Taubaté, in the central nucleus of the country and close to the aeronautical industry in the Paraíba Valley. Later, the units were deconcentrated, but the bulk of the personnel remains in Taubaté.

AvEx is especially important for mobility in the Amazon, where it had its "baptism of fire" in Operation Traíra, in 1991. In the 21st century it is widely used in the security of large events and operations to guarantee law and order. Helicopters operate in close coordination with ground forces in logistics, reconnaissance, fire support and troop transport roles. Its priority function was originally conceived as air assault, inserting troops from the 12th Brigade behind enemy lines, but the number of helicopters is a limitation. Pilots and specialists (such as flight mechanics) are respectively officers and sergeants trained at the Army Aviation Instruction Center (Centro de Instrução de Aviação do Exército, CIAvEx). Helicopter logistics are complex and depend on imported technology. The Maintenance and Supply Battalion (Batalhão de Manutenção e Suprimento, BMS), in Taubaté, has the mission of keeping 70% of the helicopters available for immediate use, while the Taubaté Aviation Base (Base de Aviação de Taubaté, BAvT) manages the infrastructure and carries out air traffic control. The fleet corresponded to 13% of the aircraft of the Brazilian Armed Forces in 2022.

The aviation battalions are mixed, with reconnaissance and attack squadrons, with helicopters such as the HA-1 Esquilo (Eurocopter Ecureuil and Fennec), and general use, with maneuver helicopters such as the HM-1 Pantera (Eurocopter Panther). HA-1 Esquilo is also the standard model for training. These two models were the first to be purchased, but the HA-1 did not meet the army's ambitions for air-to-ground or air-to-air combat, and the HM-1 for transport capability. The army acquired new maneuver helicopters, the HM-2 Black Hawk (Sikorsky UH-60), HM-3 Cougar (Eurocopter Cougar) and HM-4 Jaguar (Eurocopter Caracal), respectively in 1997, 1999 and 2011. HA-1, HM-1 and HM-4 are assembled by Helibras. The Army Strategic Aviation Program, formalized by the Army General Staff (Estado-Maior do Exército, EME) in 2017, included AvEx in the army's project portfolio, with plans such as the acquisition of dedicated attack helicopters and fixed-wing aircraft for logistics; however, the intention to acquire planes was prevented by pressure from the FAB in 2020. CIAvEx was chosen to train the army's remotely piloted aircraft system operators (SARP) and several were received in 2022.

== History ==
=== Fixed-wing aviation (pre-1941) ===
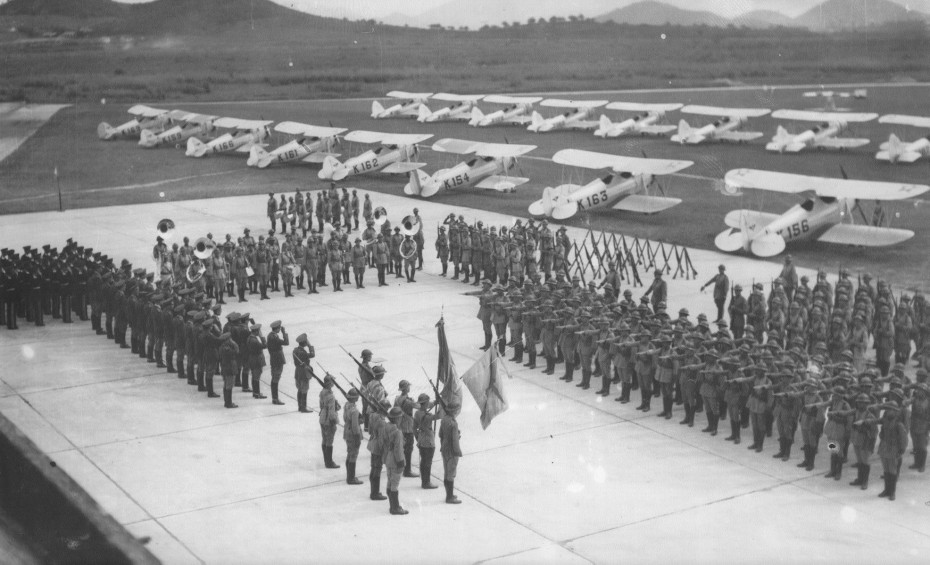
Anniversary of the Military Aviation School in 1936

The Brazilian Army's first aeronautical experience was the use of observation balloons in 1867 during the Paraguayan War. Then, at the beginning of the 20th century, new airplane technology entered the agenda of military reforms. The country did not have an aeronautical industry, and it was difficult to create an aviation school. The army's first airplane pilot was lieutenant Ricardo Kirk, licensed in France in 1912. He flew reconnaissance missions in the Contestado War, where he died in an accident in 1915.

After the end of the First World War, Brazil managed to hire French instructors and import surplus planes. In 1919, the Military Aviation School was created in Campo dos Afonsos, Rio de Janeiro, to train aviators, observers and mechanics. Aviation was elevated to branch status in 1927. It was the great novelty in the army in the 1920s. It was used on a large scale for the first time in the Constitutionalist Revolution of 1932. From 1933 onwards, its operational units were installed throughout the country, and in 1941 it already had 330 aircraft, although many were obsolete or inoperable, with insufficient personnel and structures for national defense.

Army, naval and commercial aviation existed independently. Military aviators became increasingly different from their counterparts on land and sea, developing an ethos of their own. In the 1930s, a movement emerged proposing the unification of aviation into a "Ministry of Air". They had ambitious plans for air power and considered the separation of their assets inefficient. The Brazilian Air Force, created in 1941, absorbed Army Aviation, Naval Aviation and other aerial organizations. Its creation was a political decision, as the new institution was a third weight in the rivalry between the army and navy. The Ministry of the Navy was against the measure, while the Ministry of War was in favor. Some generals wanted a transitional Air Ministry; military aviation would be unified in a sub-secretariat subordinate to the army. President Getúlio Vargas did not give in to the army's intention, and the Air Force consolidated itself as a new branch. The Military Aviation School would become the current Air Force Academy, and the former army air units correspond to the FAB Air Bases/Wings.

=== Reactivation (1986) ===
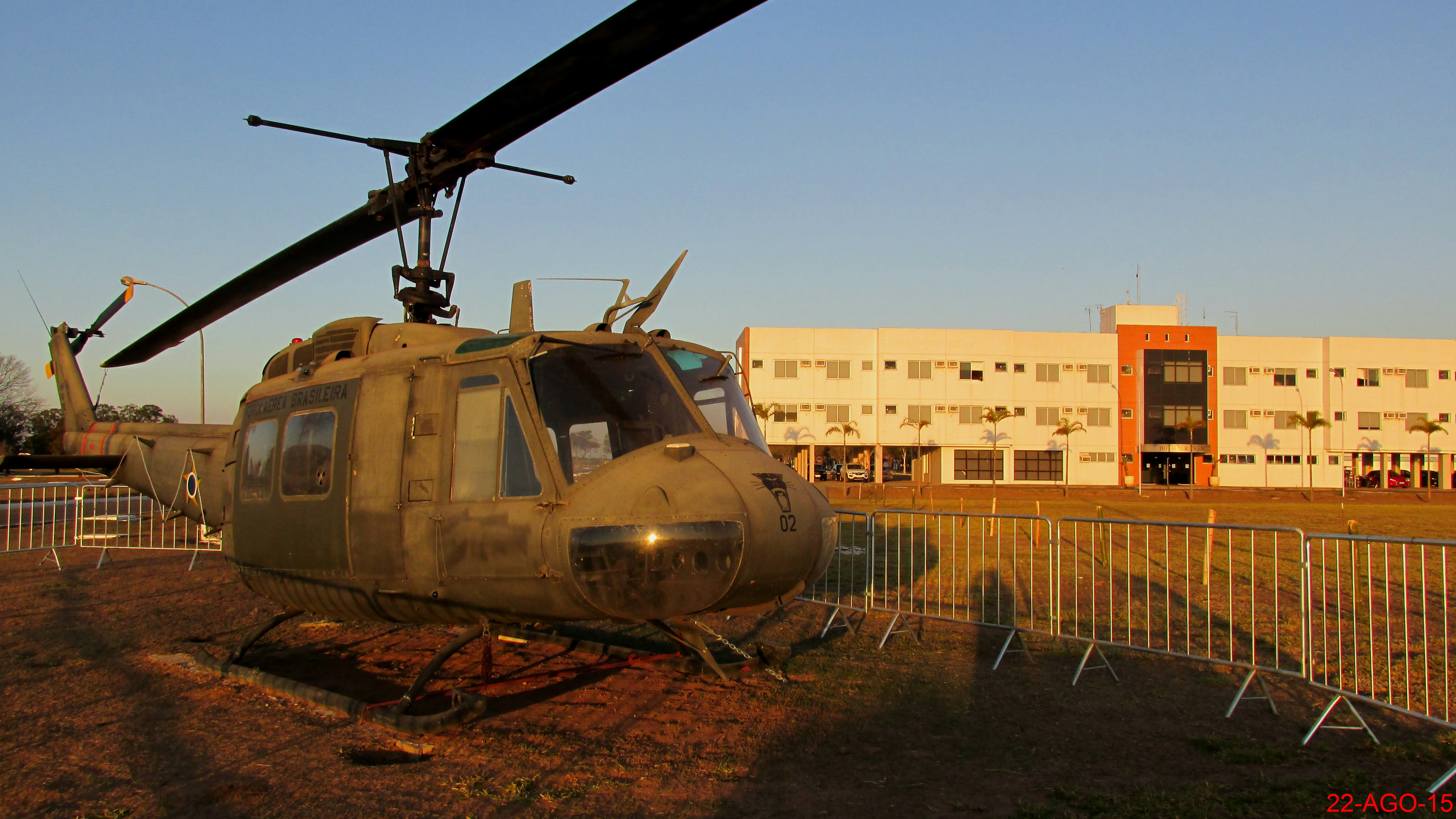
Bell "Huey" helicopter from the air force, a model that operated with the army in Araguaia

After airplanes, another great technological innovation emerged in the Korean War and especially in the Vietnam War, in the 1960s: the military helicopter. Capable of crossing any terrain, it proved to be versatile in the transport and close air support of ground forces and it was used on a large scale by the U.S. Armed Forces, where the concept of "air cavalry" emerged. The U.S. Army and Air Force disputed what would be the hierarchical relationship between ground forces and helicopters and reached the Johnson-McConnell Agreement of 1966: rotary-wing aircraft would remain with the army, and fixed-wing aircraft with the air force. In Brazil, the army enjoyed the support of Bell UH-1 Iroquois helicopters from the FAB in the fight against the Araguaia Guerrilla. The Army High Command was not unaware of the aviation of the other South American armies, and some Brazilian officers witnessed helicopter maneuvers by the American and French armies.

Brazilian cavalry officers, inspired by the American example, already imagined the helicopter as a future evolution after armored vehicles in 1965. This ambition was never realized, as Brazilian helicopters would not appear in the cavalry. The 1970 Army Reorganization Master Plan provided for the recreation of army aviation. Officials did not want to depend on the FAB for logistics, troop transport and airmobile operations. The aviation envisaged in this plan would have a mix of helicopters and planes and decentralized distribution, unlike the aviation implemented in 1986. Many reforms were implemented in the 1970s, but not aviation. In 1977, the Army General Staff (EME) began studies on organic aviation.

It was the experience of the Falklands War in 1982 that definitively pushed the military authorities to decide on helicopters. The Argentine Armed Forces, the most advanced on the continent at the time, had been defeated, and one of the many aspects was the smaller number of helicopters. The Brazilian gap in the operational, technological and human areas became clear and worrying. The army planned Ground Force 90 (FT-90), deployed from 1986 to 1990, as the first part of a modernization program. The necessary investments were heavy and the country was going through the lost decade, but president José Sarney, needing political support from Army Minister Leônidas Pires Gonçalves, provided the necessary resources. 500 million extrabudgetary dollars were allocated to the army in 1986–1987. Much of this effort did not bear fruit, but in the technological area Army Aviation and electronic warfare were successfully introduced.

Among the broken paradigms was the traditional aircraft monopoly held by the FAB. The navy and air force had already fought a long battle over embarked aviation on the aircraft carrier Minas Gerais. The "Castelo Branco corollary", of 1965, allowed the navy to operate helicopters, but kept the planes with the FAB. A new dispute arose when the army unsuccessfully attempted to purchase Bell H-1H helicopters in 1969. But Army Aviation, also made up of helicopters, was created without fanfare or contrary campaign. Air Force officials already recognized the tactical need for helicopters in the army and navy. Army Aviation was formally recreated on 3 September 1986.

=== Implantation ===
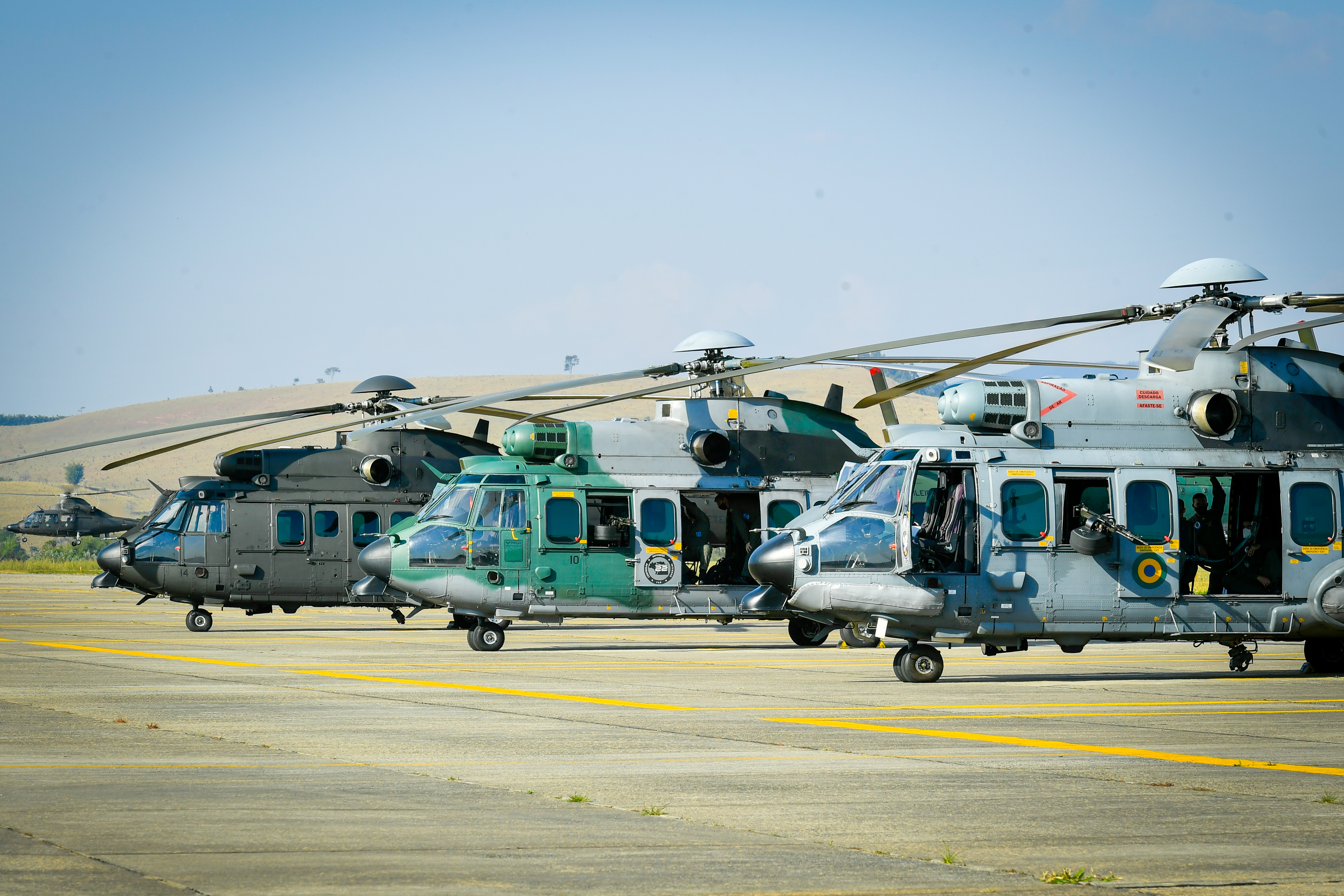
Brazilian army, air force and navy helicopters

Aviation was the "most hyped part of modernization" and the "flagship of the FT-90", but its introduction was difficult. It required a heavy financial and logistical burden and highly specialized human resources. Even with a sufficient budget, the project would take at least a decade. General Leônidas remarked the incredulity of a government interlocutor: "an army that does not even have combat boots wants to have a helicopter!" Aircraft were purchased and the initial personnel trained in the navy and air force. To preserve the army's organizational culture, those sent were former captains and sergeants. The most time-consuming part would be the employment doctrine, as it could not be copied from another country. As aircraft arrived before doctrine, aviation underwent five major restructurings from its formal creation in 1986 until 1994; the important thing for the Army Minister was to take advantage of the favorable situation.

In the Ajuricaba Mission, in October 1990, the helicopters were presented to garrisons in Minas Gerais, Brasília, the Center-West and the North, covering nine thousand kilometers from Taubaté. Difficulties in long-distance travel and operation in hot and humid regions, with restricted landing areas, were assessed. In 1991, the training of human resources within the army began with the creation of the Army Aviation Instruction Center. Budget cuts hit the Armed Forces hard in the early 1990s. AvEx was one of the few areas spared the effect of cuts by the Army High Command. It became part of the army's "core of modernity", as did the 12th Light Infantry Brigade (Airmobile). This brigade, converted in 1995, emerged parallel to aviation as a unit capable of operating in its helicopters. The "Delta Doctrine", adopted by the army in 2000, by valuing flank and rear operations, attributed great importance to airmobile operations. AvEx became one of the army's Strategic Deployment Forces, with immediate mobilization capabilities.

=== Activities ===
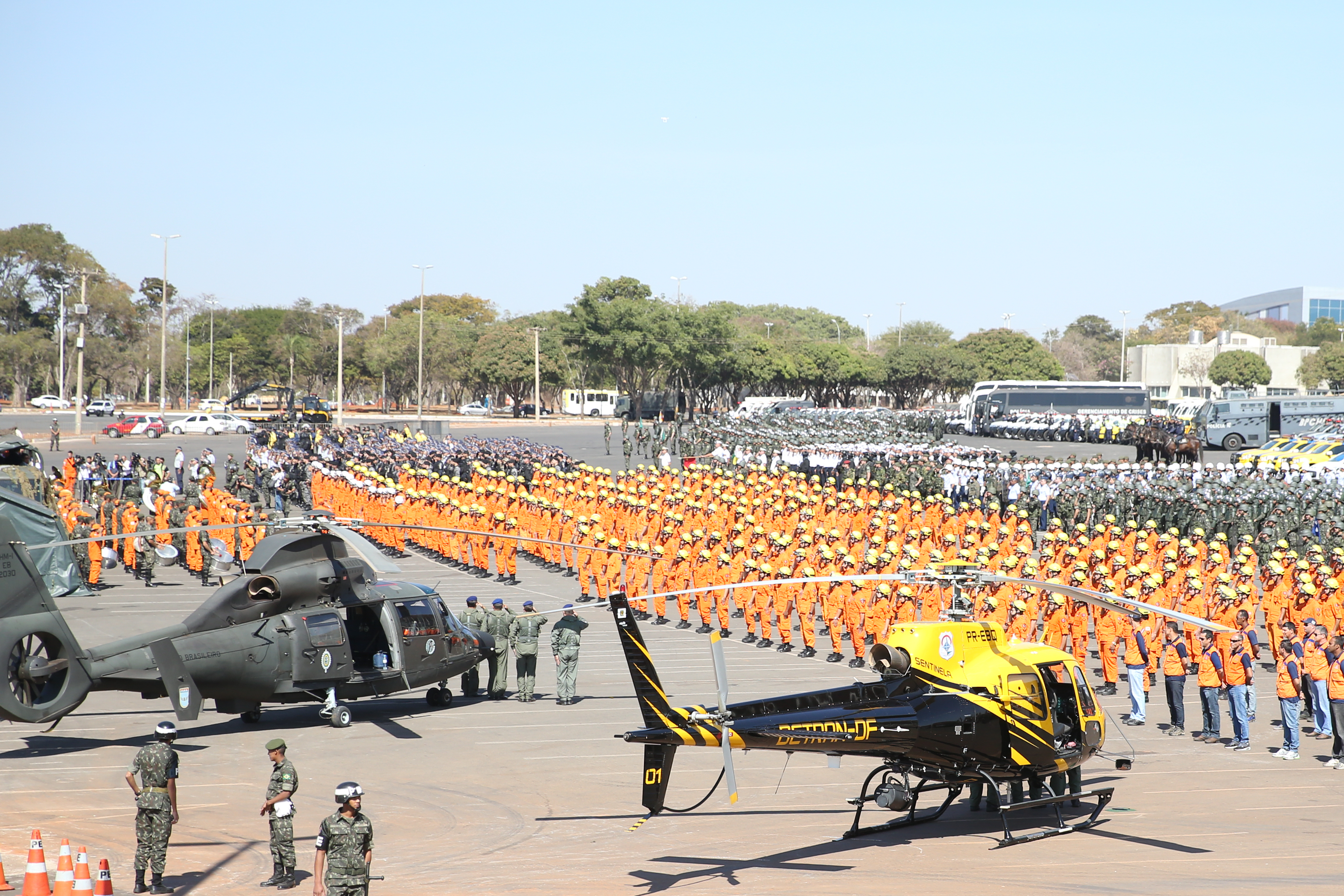
HM-1 Pantera used in security at the 2016 Olympics

The "baptism of fire" of the newly created Army Aviation was Operation Traíra in 1991, a joint offensive by the Brazilian and Colombian Armed Forces against the Revolutionary Armed Forces of Colombia on the border. HA-1 Esquilo and HM-1 Pantera helicopters and supply and maintenance personnel took part in the operation. They took supplies to the base on the Traíra River, transported the 1st Special Border Battalion and infiltrated and exfiltrated patrols from the 1st Special Forces Battalion. The operation revealed the need to introduce instrument flight rules, GPS navigation and an aviation base in the Amazon.

Throughout the 1990s, Army Aviation participated in operations against illegal mining and organized crime in Rio de Janeiro and conventional presence missions on the border with Venezuela. The first international mission was the Military Observer Mission between Ecuador and Peru (MOMEP), in 1997, with the participation of four helicopters in the zone of territorial dispute between the two countries. (Note: See Cenepa War.) In the 21st century, the use of Army Aviation in ensuring law and order and collaboration with security agencies is increasing. In the federal intervention in Rio de Janeiro in 2018, helicopters were used for command and control, reconnaissance and troop landing.

The operations go beyond military purposes, as the helicopters also cooperate with civilian ministries and public bodies such as IBAMA, the Federal Police and Civil Defense; for example, in floods and landslides on the north coast of São Paulo in 2023, there was coordination between the Ministry of Defense, army, São Paulo Fire Department, Military Police and Civil Defense. Six helicopters from the 1st and 2nd BAvEx transported firefighters and participated in search and rescue operations. In the same year, FAB and AvEx helicopters were used in the government response to the Yanomami humanitarian crisis. They served for the logistics of supplies and aeromedical evacuation of the affected population, in addition to transporting military personnel and civilians from the agencies involved in the operation.

=== New aircraft categories ===
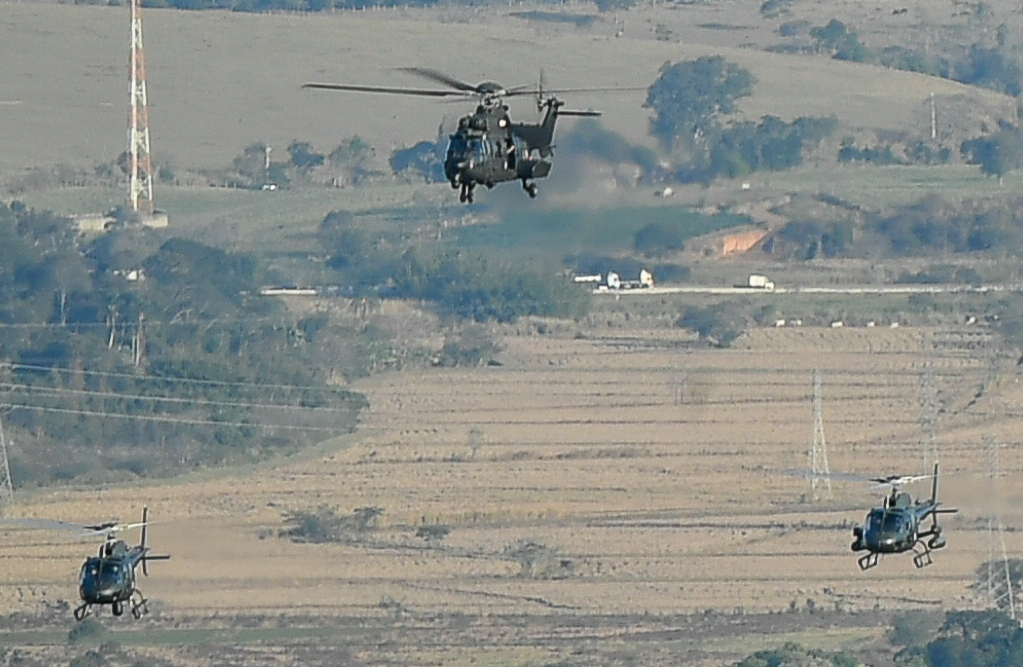
General purpose helicopter (Super Cougar) between two reconnaissance and attack helicopters (Esquilo)

Army Aviation was created with attack helicopters (HA-1 Fennec or Esquilo), in reconnaissance and attack squadrons, and maneuver helicopters (HM-1 Pantera and later HM-2 Black Hawk, HM-3 Cougar and HM-4 Jaguar), in general deployment squadrons. Both can use side machine guns for their defense, but the reconnaissance and attack ones also have axial weapons such as machine guns and rocket launchers. General purpose helicopters are larger and have greater transport capacity.

The Brazilian Army does not have a dedicated attack helicopter like those used in France (Tiger) and the United States (Apache), whose firepower is superior to the Brazilian HA-1. This gap was addressed in the army's Strategic Aviation Program, formalized by EME in August 2017. The army's strategic guidelines now include AvEx programs, including the acquisition of dedicated attack helicopters and fixed-wing aircraft for logistics. 12 new-build attack helicopters would be purchased by 2031. (Note: Lucchesi & Leite 2018a, p. 60. Models such as TAI/AgustaWestland T129 ATAK, Bell AH-1Z Viper, Agusta A-129D Mangusta and Mi-28NE Havoc were considered (Sobue 2021). In 2018, the army also evaluated a batch of second hand Bell AH-1W, according to Lopes, Roberto (27 April 2018). "Exército Brasileiro mira lote maior de helicópteros AH-1W usados".)

The fixed-wing aircraft program was controversial. Dissatisfied with the air force's logistics, the army intended to acquire eight Short C-23 Sherpa planes to supply its Special Border Platoons in the Amazon. A presidential decree allowed the army to possess fixed-wing aircraft in 2020, but it was revoked just two days after its publication. The acquisition was harshly opposed by air force officers and even some army officers. They considered the heavy expenditure on these aircraft inopportune at a time of scarce resources, preferring that investment be made in the FAB's idle planes.

The army and FAB's demand for remotely piloted aircraft systems had already been noted in the press since 2013. The army's interest was in monitoring borders and strategic points, such as the Itaipu Dam, and in the security of major events. The doctrine in Brazil in this area is new. Drones can serve as more economical alternatives to the HA-1 Esquilo in the reconnaissance role. Outside of AvEx, the Parachute Precursor Company was already using the technology in 2016. In Taubaté, larger drones were incorporated at the end of 2022. The army chose CIAvEx as the human resources training unit in the drone area.

== Aircraft fleet ==
=== Helicopters ===
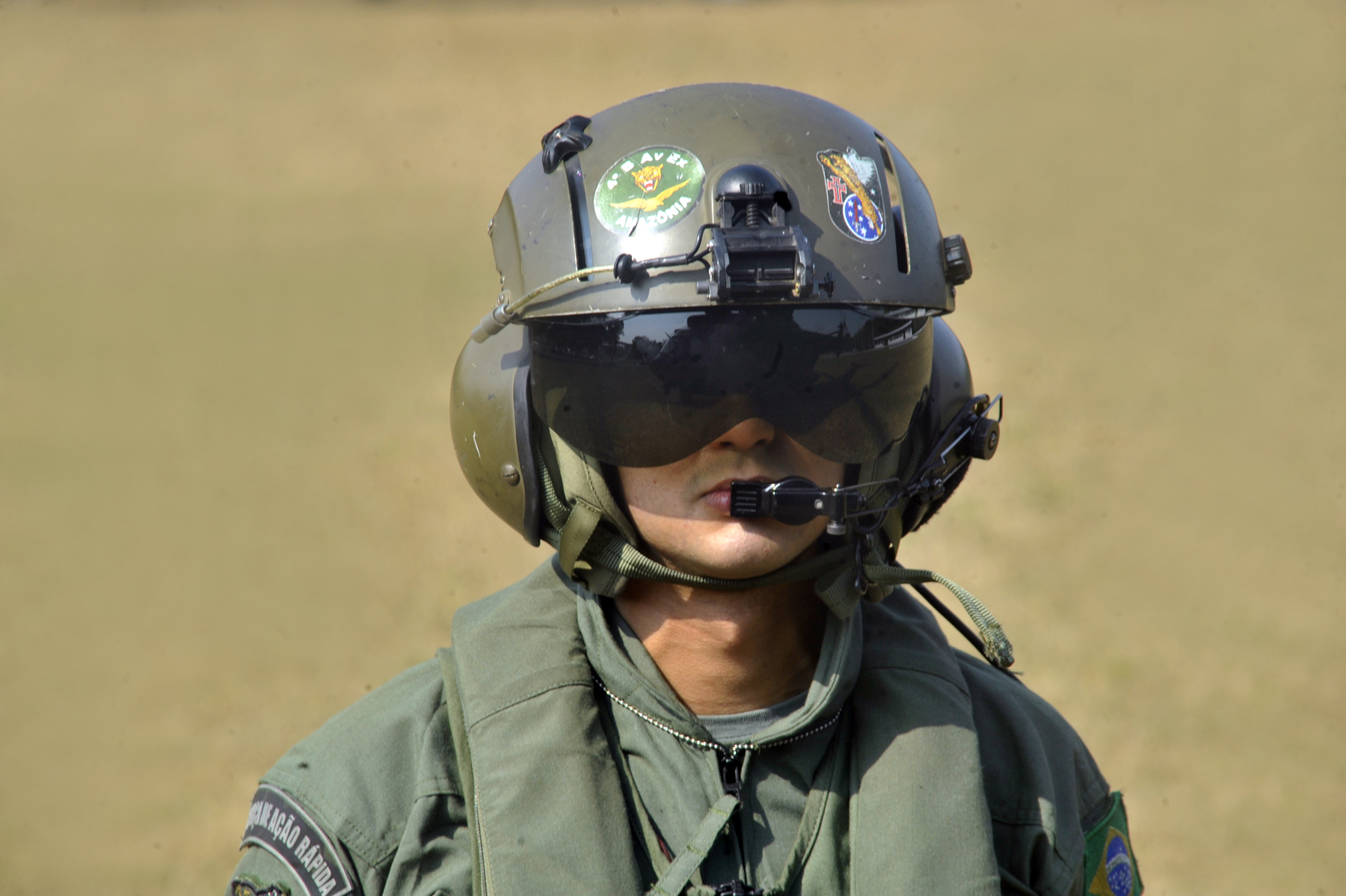
Helicopter crew member of the 4th BAvEx

Bell was the company expected to win in the first tender for the purchase of helicopters, but it was surprisingly defeated by Aérospatiale, which already had a factory in Brazil, Helibras. The first acquisition was made in 1987, and the first helicopter was delivered on 21 April 1989. Since then, the army has been its largest rotary-wing customer. Initially, 36 HM-1 Pantera and 16 HA-1 Esquilo were acquired, and then 20 Fennec, also designated HA-1. Its limitations became evident: in air-to-ground combat, the HA-1 would be within range of enemy fire and would not be able to fire from covered or sheltered positions nor would it be suitable for air-to-air combat. Therefore, it would be inadequate to defend maneuver helicopters during the landing of troops. In turn, the HM-1 was unsafe in borderline takeoff weight conditions, reducing the combat group (GC) that could be transported from nine to seven men.

Pantera's reduced transport capacity led to the purchase of four Black Hawk (HM-2) aircraft, from Sikorsky, and eight Cougar (HM-3), from Aérospatiale, respectively in 1997 and 1999. Both were designed for military use, with features such as superior armor and night vision. They carry 12 (HM-2) and 22 (HM-3) passengers which, in the case of the HM-3, allows it to carry two complete GCs instead of one. In the mid-2000s, the HA-1 proved useful in reconnaissance following the installation of the Sistema Olho de Águia (Eagle's Eye System), with a camera and antenna installed below the floor and connected to military decision-makers on the ground. The Black Hawk is the only model of American origin; all other helicopters are French technologies.

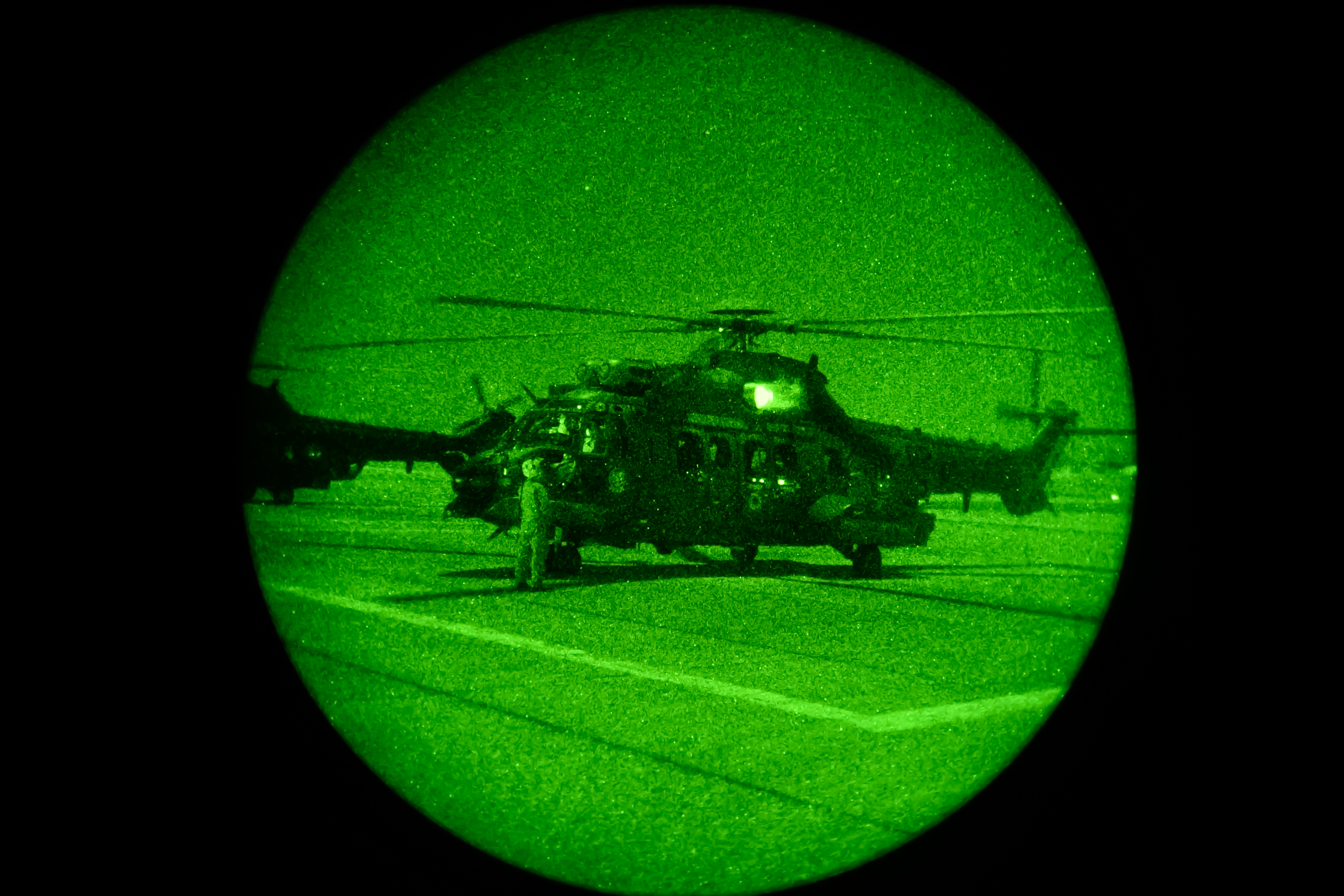
Night vision of helicopters undergoing joint training with the navy and air force

16 EC 725 (H225-M), a more advanced version of the HM-3, began arriving in 2011 and were designated HM-4 Jaguar. Its purchase is part of the HX-BR program, whereby 50 of these helicopters would be assembled by Helibras for the Armed Forces. Jaguar's sensors can collect electromagnetic signals for signals intelligence. It has defense systems that do not exist on the Cougar, making it better for combat support, but it loses in terms of power reserve, and thus, in usefulness for logistical support. (Note: Martins 2020, pp. 15–16. HM-4 has early warning laser detector, radar detector, missile approach warning and flares launcher; as noted by Santos 2018, p. 63, this additional weight and the lower fuel economy of the HM-4's engine diminish its power reserve.)

Modernization contracts for the HM-1 and HA-1 were signed in 2009 and 2010, respectively, to incorporate items such as night vision and the recovery of two crashed aircraft each. Two other lost HA-1s were not recovered. The new standards were called AS.365K2 Super Pantera and Fennec AvEx. With the availability of night vision on all helicopter models, all missions can be flown at night, and the HA-1 also has infrared vision. Modernization was still ongoing in 2017, when the army's Strategic Aviation Program proposed replacing the Cougar and Black Hawk with a new medium-lift helicopter, to be designated HM-5. (Note: Lucchesi & Leite 2018a, p. 61, listing the Bell UH-1Y Venom, UH-60M (more modern version of the Black Hawk) and the AgustaWestland AW149 as models already considered for this purpose.) In 2023 the army decided replace all HM-2s and HM-3s in operation with twelve factory-new Black Hawks, which are expected to be received from 2025.

At the end of the modernization, in 2021, the Fennec and Pantera received the new designations of HA-1A and HM-1A. The Super Pantera's new engines allow it to carry nine passengers instead of seven. The Strategic Program also provided for new weapons, not yet implemented at the end of 2022, in the Helicopter Axial Armament and Imaging System (Sistema de Armamento Axial e Imageamento de Helicópteros, SiAAIH) 24 project, as the current HA-1 weapons have insufficient lethality and target acquisition is visual only, increasing the risk of friendly fire. (Note: Sobue 2021, p. 55. According to the author, ".50 machine guns are obsolete, showing a high rate of breakdowns; and although the new 70 mm Skyfire fires are already in operation, the rocket pods of just 7 slots do not offer adequate area saturation".) The program would focus on night combat, increasing the accuracy of current firepower and expanding it with Spike LR2 guided air-to-ground missiles. This would be a temporary solution to the lack of attack helicopters, and could allow the Super Pantera to serve for reconnaissance and attack in battalions lacking the Fennec.

The fleet totaled 95 aircraft in 2022. Another source, counting only 91, calculated that they represent 13% of the Brazilian military air fleet. Considering the diversity of missions, the size of the country's territory and the large capacity necessary to transport even a light infantry battalion, work at the Officer Improvement School assessed the fleet as small in 2021. (Note: In the opinion article HELICOPTERS, rare pieces in the AMAZON, published in Revista Sociedade Militar on 6 July 2020, colonel Paulo Ricardo da Rocha Paiva questioned the transport capacity available for the jungle infantry and speculated that the supply of helicopters could be cut by technology suppliers, precisely countries interested in the Brazilian Amazon.)

Brazilian Army Helicopters

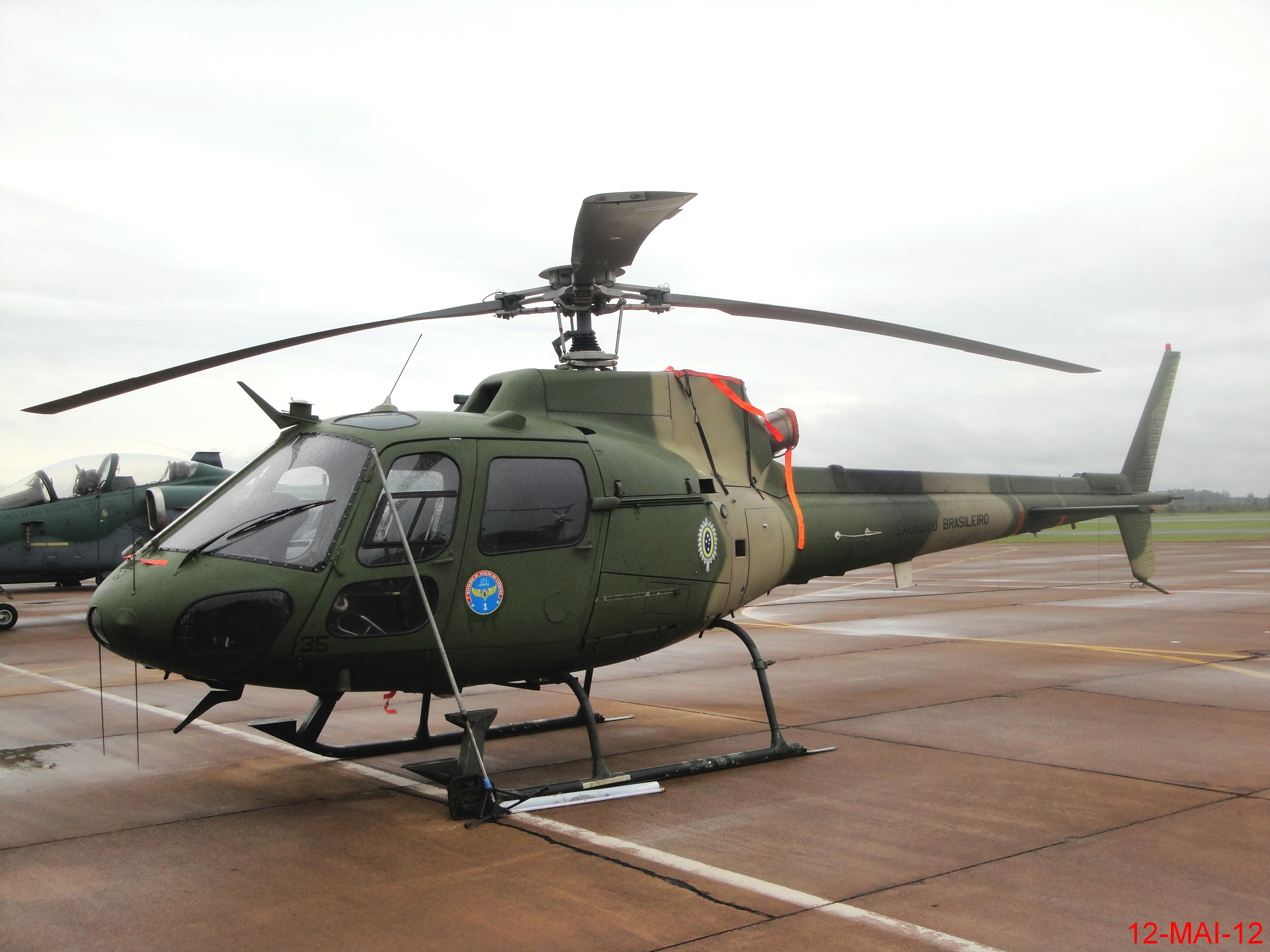
HA-1 Esquilo

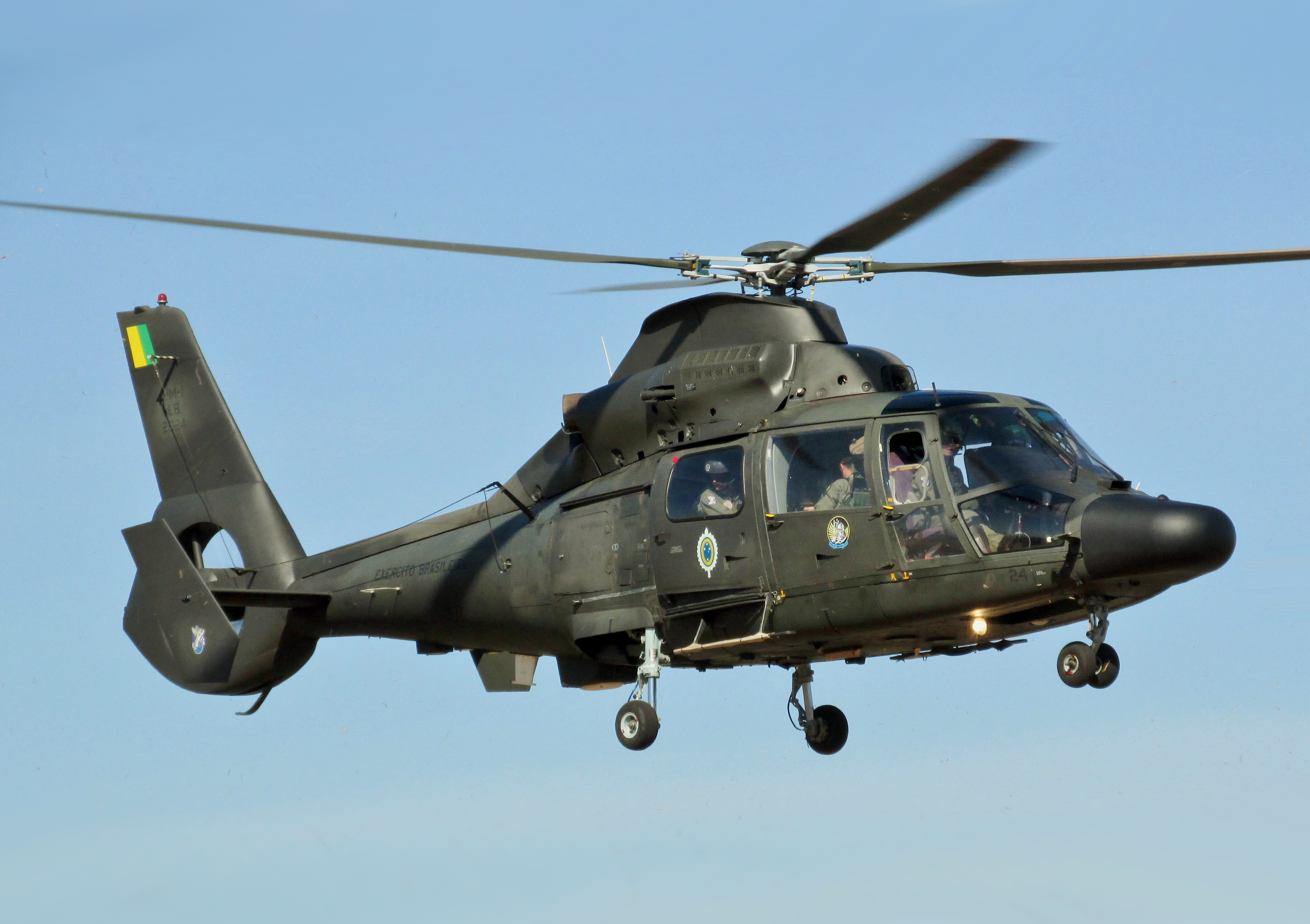
HM-1 Pantera

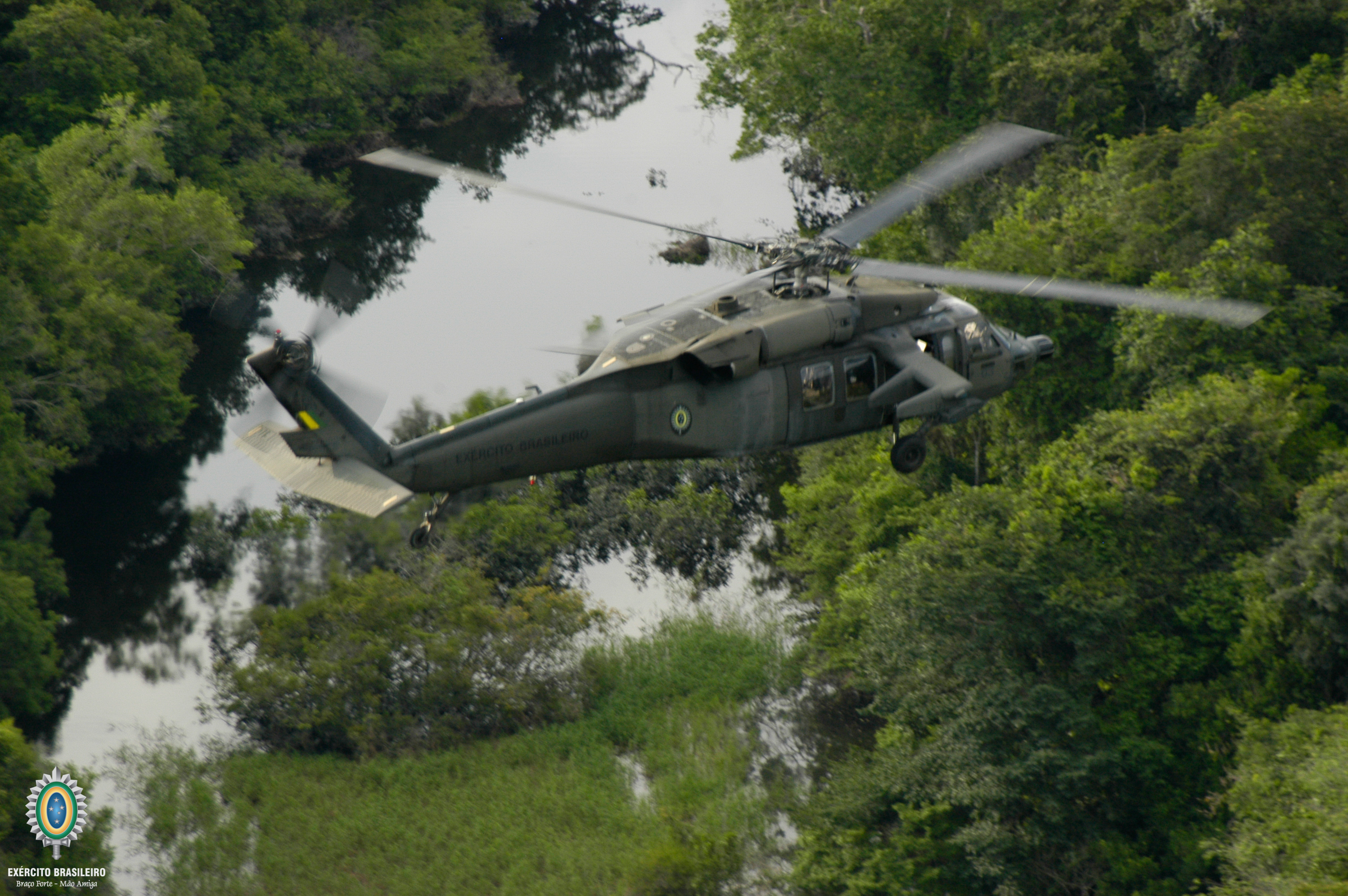
HM-2 Black Hawk

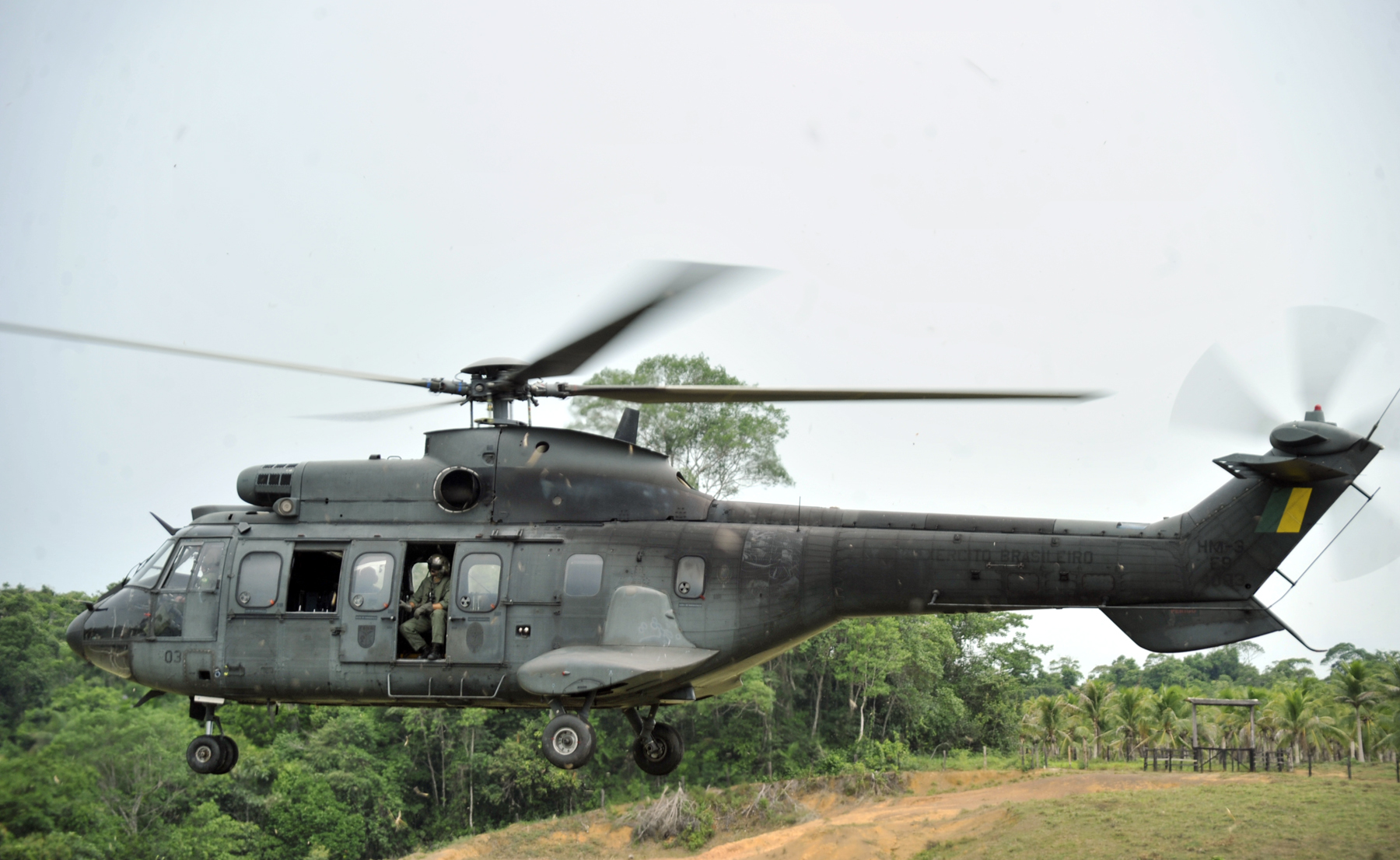
HM-3 Cougar

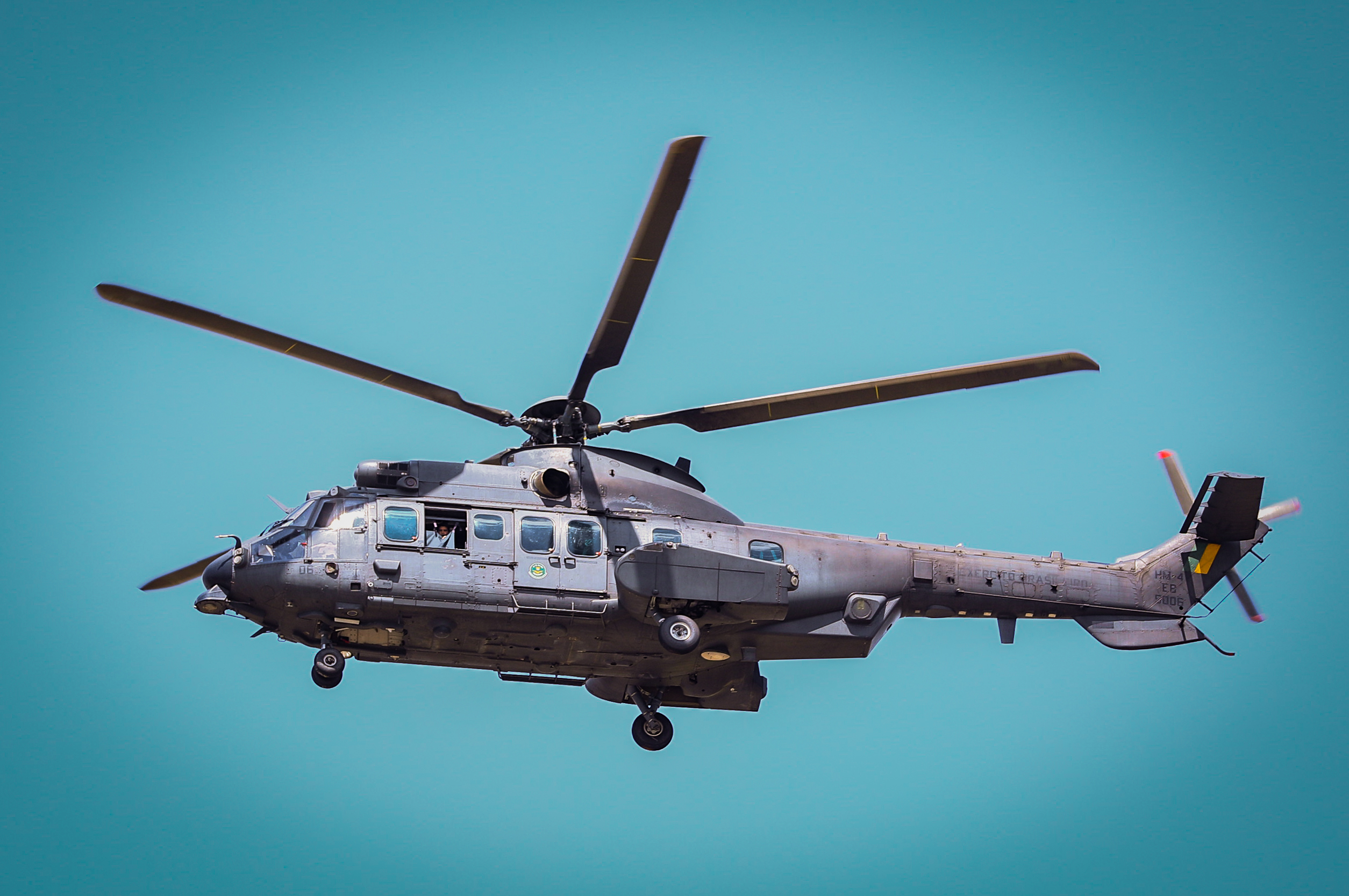
HM-4 Jaguar

=== Remotely piloted aircraft systems ===
From November to December 2022, Army Aviation incorporated batches of drones in categories 0, 1 and 2. The categories classify the remotely pilotede aircraft by its altitude and range of action, autonomy and employment level. Briefly, category 0 is used at company level, 1 by battalions, and 2 by large units such as brigades. 30 Mavic 2, category 0, four Matrice 300 RTK, category 1, both from the Chinese company DJI, and three Nauru 1000C, category 2, from the Brazilian company XMobots, were received. Their flight autonomy is 31 minutes, 50 minutes and ten hours respectively. They have intelligence, reconnaissance, surveillance and target acquisition functions, serving in border, urban operations and conventional operations. The Nauru 1000C will be evaluated at the army's 3rd Aviation Battalion, in the Western Military Command.

Army remotely piloted aircraft

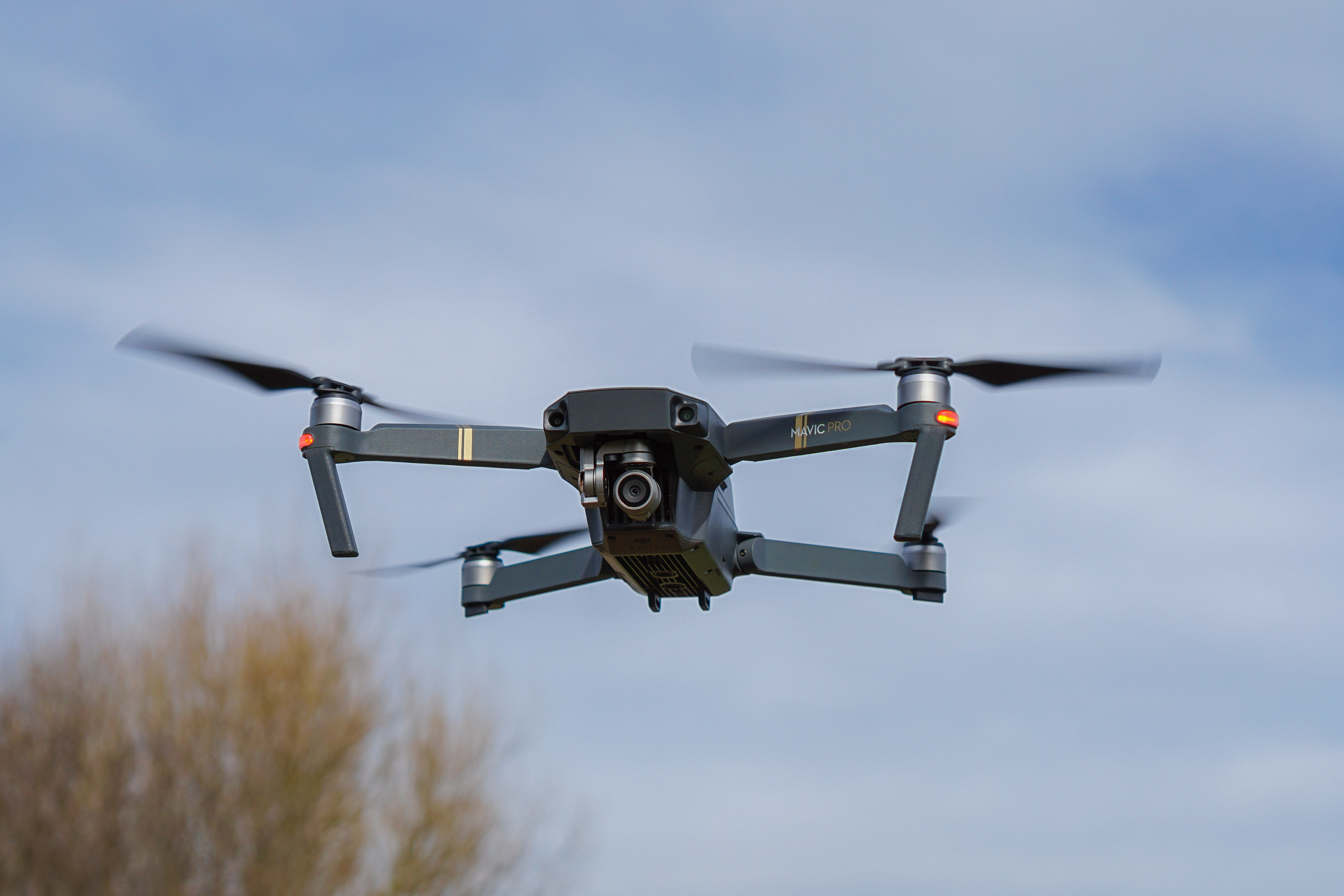
DJI Mavic 2 (category 0)

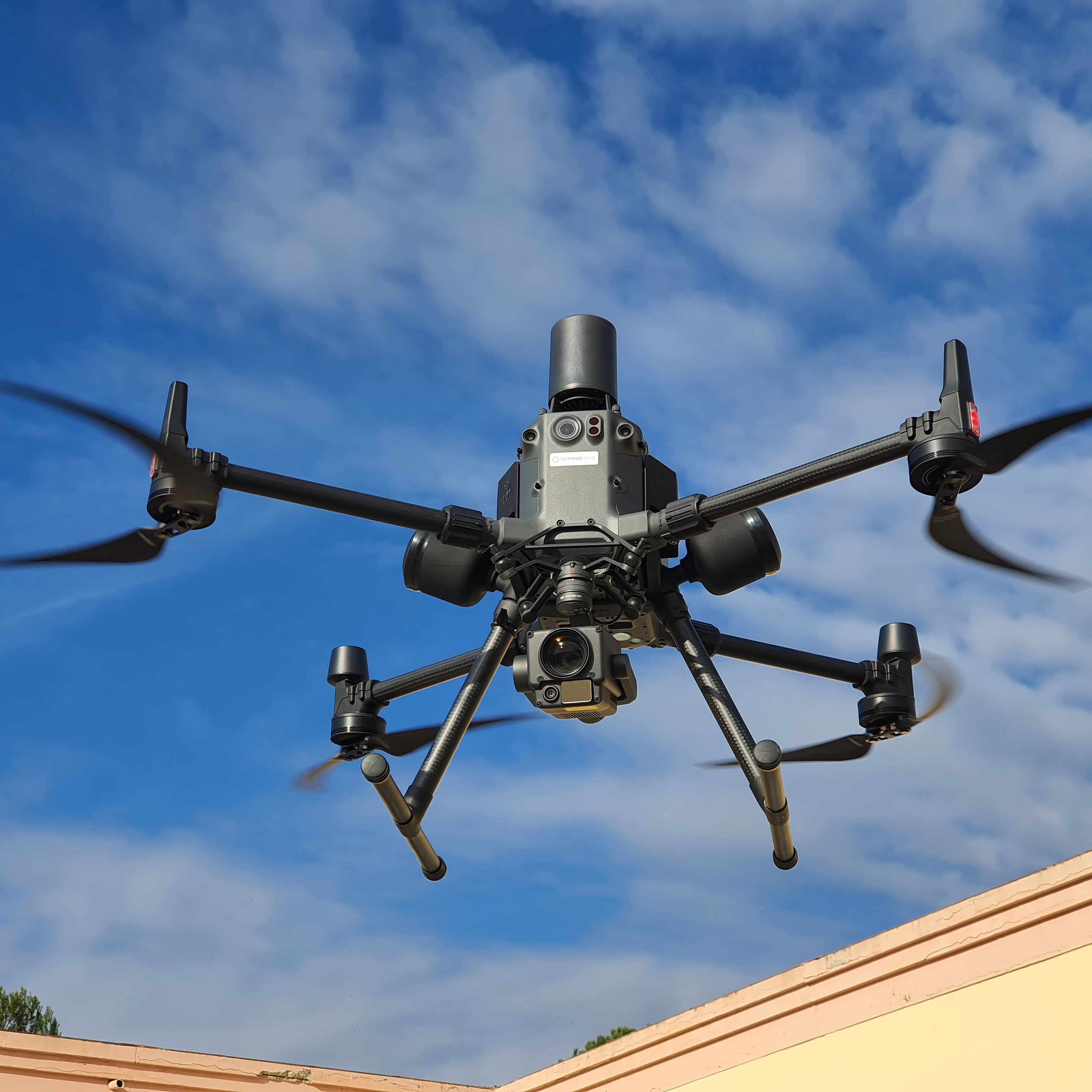
DJI Matrice 300 RTK (category 1)

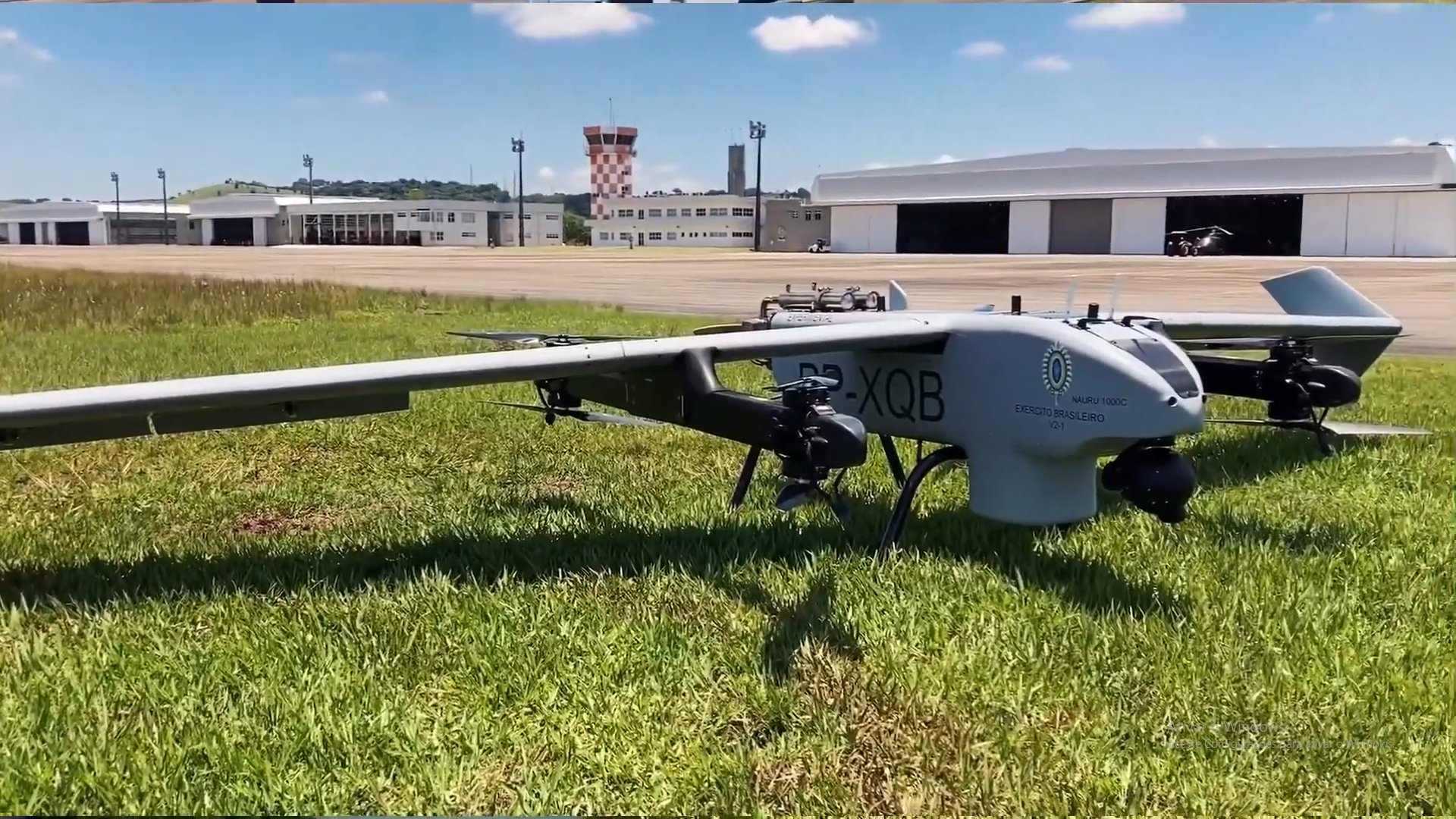
Nauru 1000C (category 2) landed

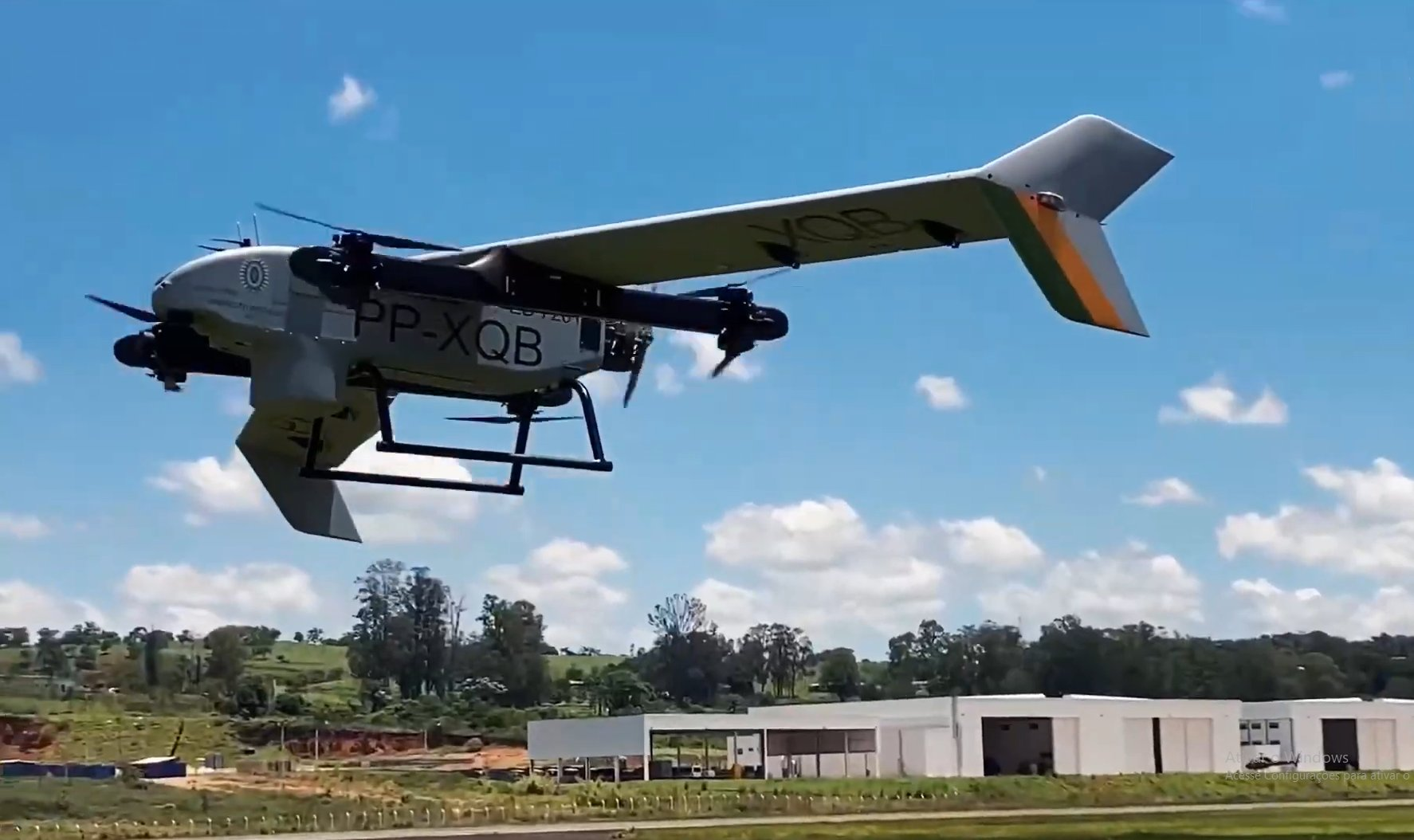
Nauru 1000C taking off

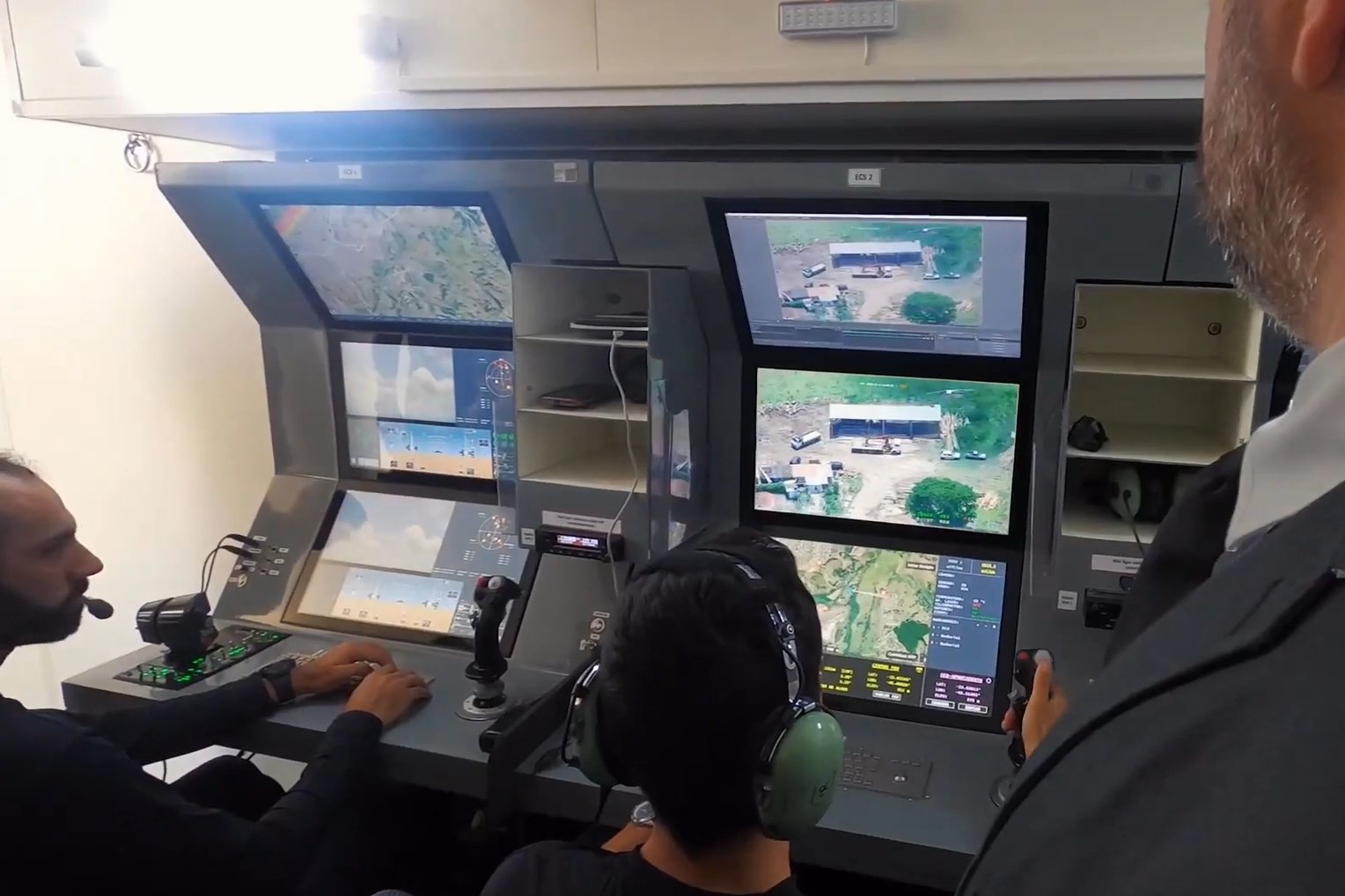
Nauru 1000C Console

== Operations ==
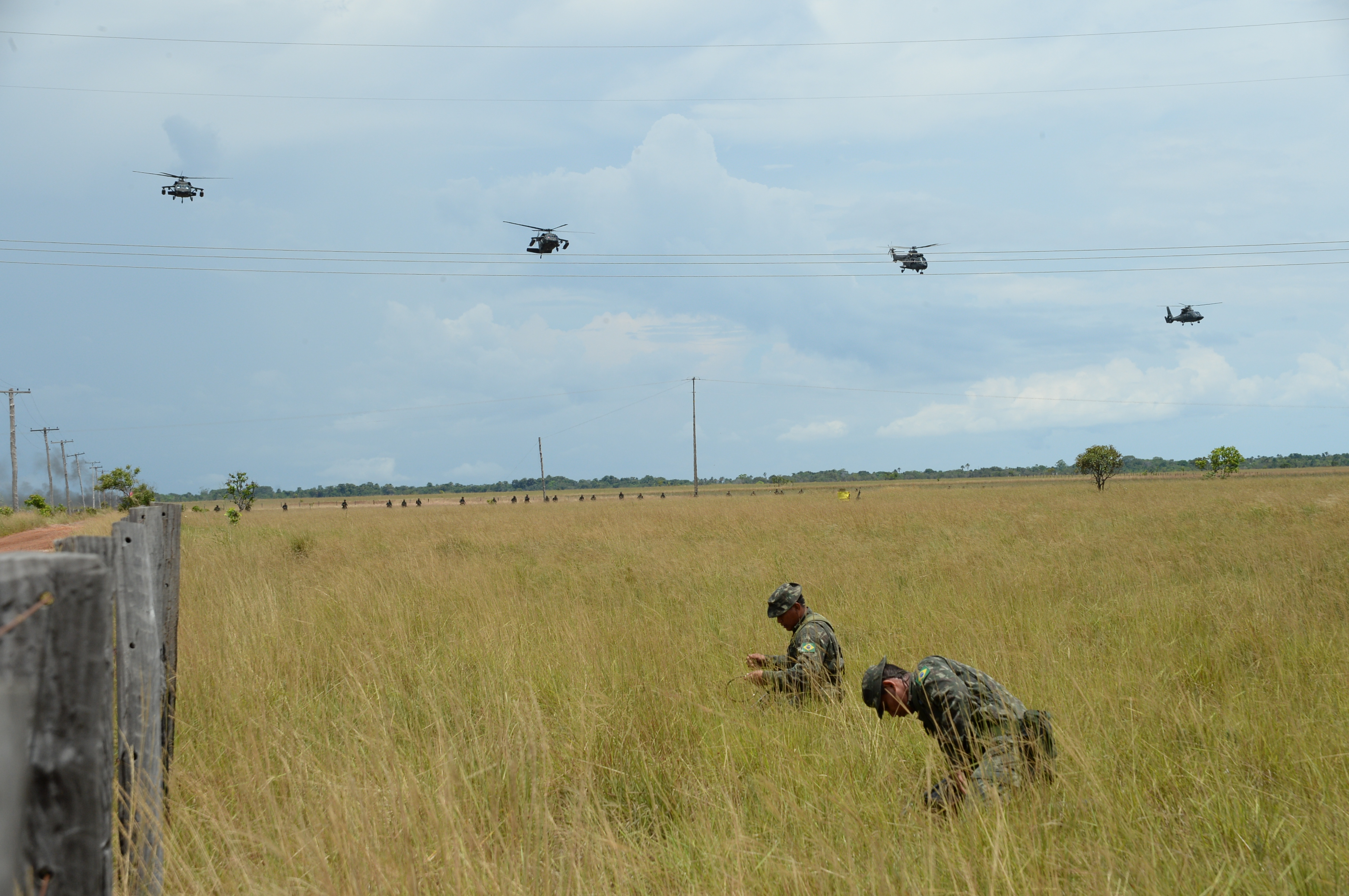
Joint action of surface forces and helicopters

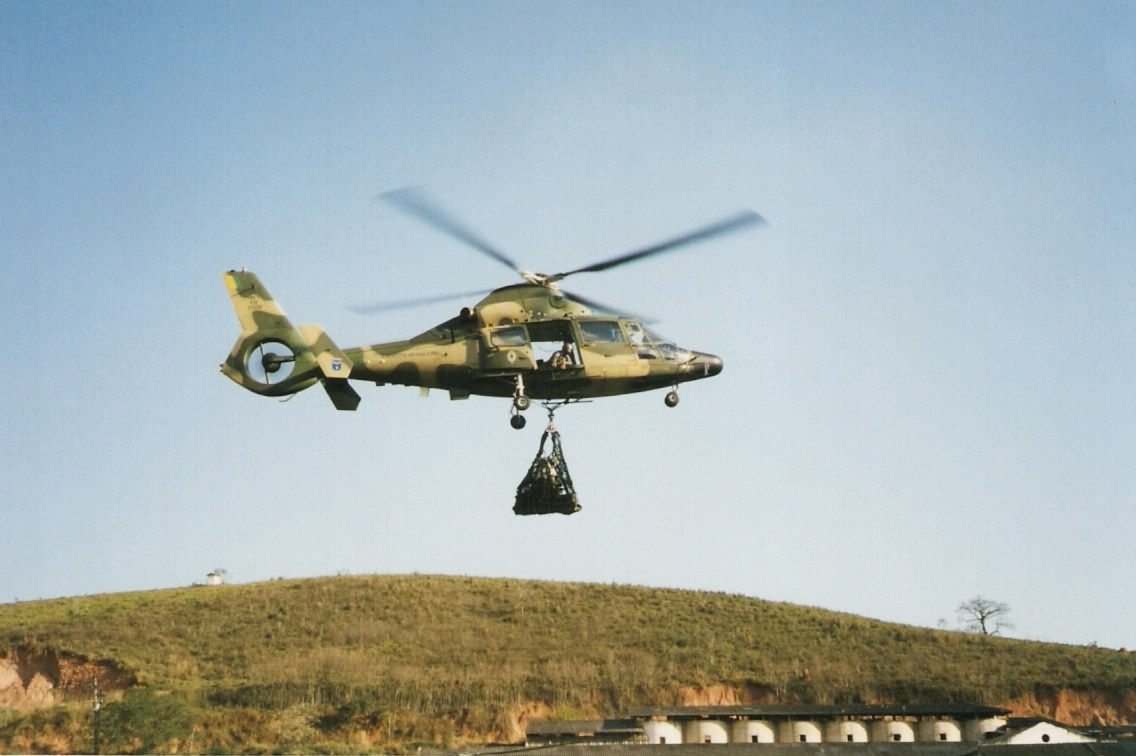
Cargo transport of an artillery group

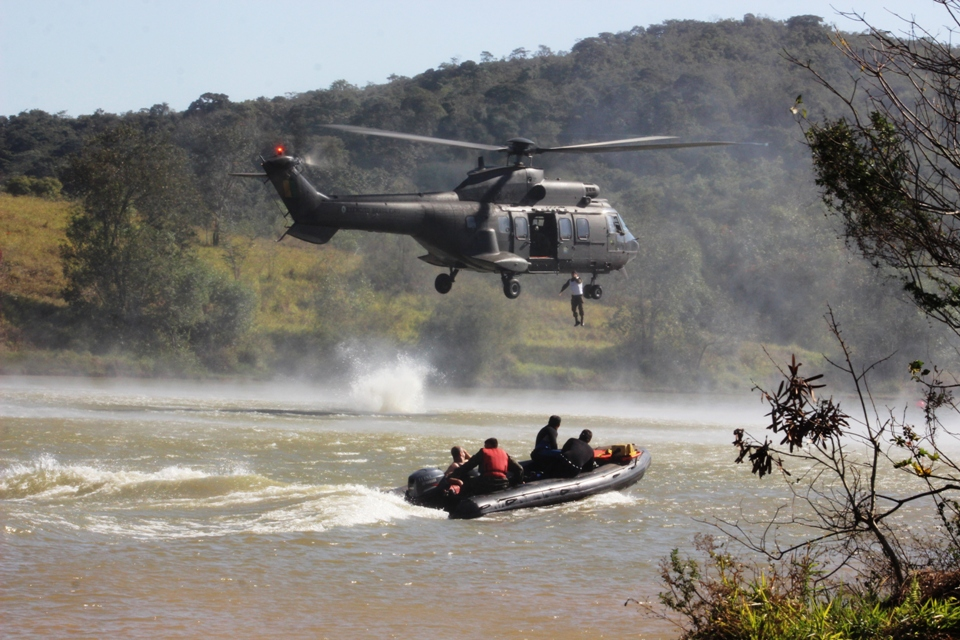
Water infiltration training with the Arms Sergeants School

Unlike FAB helicopter crews, in army aviation it is necessary to understand the ground maneuver and the language of the troops. During operations, helicopters fly low, in close integration with surface forces. This aviation provides aeromobility and power projection to the ground force, with numerous missions:

Army aviation has been used to carry out missions directly related to combat operations, such as attack, reconnaissance, security missions, incursions, infiltrations and airmobile exfiltration, in training troops in airmobile techniques, combat support and logistical support, as well as air support for various units, personnel transport, medical evacuation, artillery fire calibration.

The most important function is air assault, with troops on board, and thus, aviation is closely linked to the 12th Light Infantry Brigade (Airmobile). Maneuver helicopters transport troops, while attack helicopters protect maneuver helicopters. The operation preferably takes place at night, to reduce vulnerability to the enemy. The ideal is to disembark in a single wave, but the army is unable to transport an airmobile task force, the size of a battalion, at once.

In much of the Amazon, helicopters are a much faster means of transport than the only alternative, ships. For similar reasons, air transport is important in the Pantanal. The Amazon environment is challenging for helicopters: weather conditions are difficult and distances are long. Also in a mountain environment, helicopters may be preferable to roads, and thus Army Aviation can support the 4th Mountain Light Infantry Brigade. On the other hand, helicopters depend on suitable weather conditions and are vulnerable to enemy air defense and electronic warfare.

== Organization ==
The highest level of Army Aviation is its Command (CAvEx), (Note: Known as the Army Aviation Brigade before 1993. During war the Army Aviation Brigade may be reactivated. See Rodrigues, Wandercleidson da Silva (2019). A Brigada de Aviação do Exército em operações: sua logística (comum e específica) sob o enfoque da Doutrina Militar Terrestre vigente (PDF) (Thesis). Rio de Janeiro: ECEME. p. 22.) operationally subordinate to the Land Operations Command, in Brasília, and administratively to the Southeastern Military Command, in São Paulo. At his headquarters in Taubaté it commands the 1st and 2nd Army Aviation Battalions (BAvEx), the Army Aviation Instruction Center (CIAvEx), the Army Aviation Maintenance and Supply Battalion (BMS), the Taubaté Aviation Base (BAvT) and the Army Aviation Communications Company.

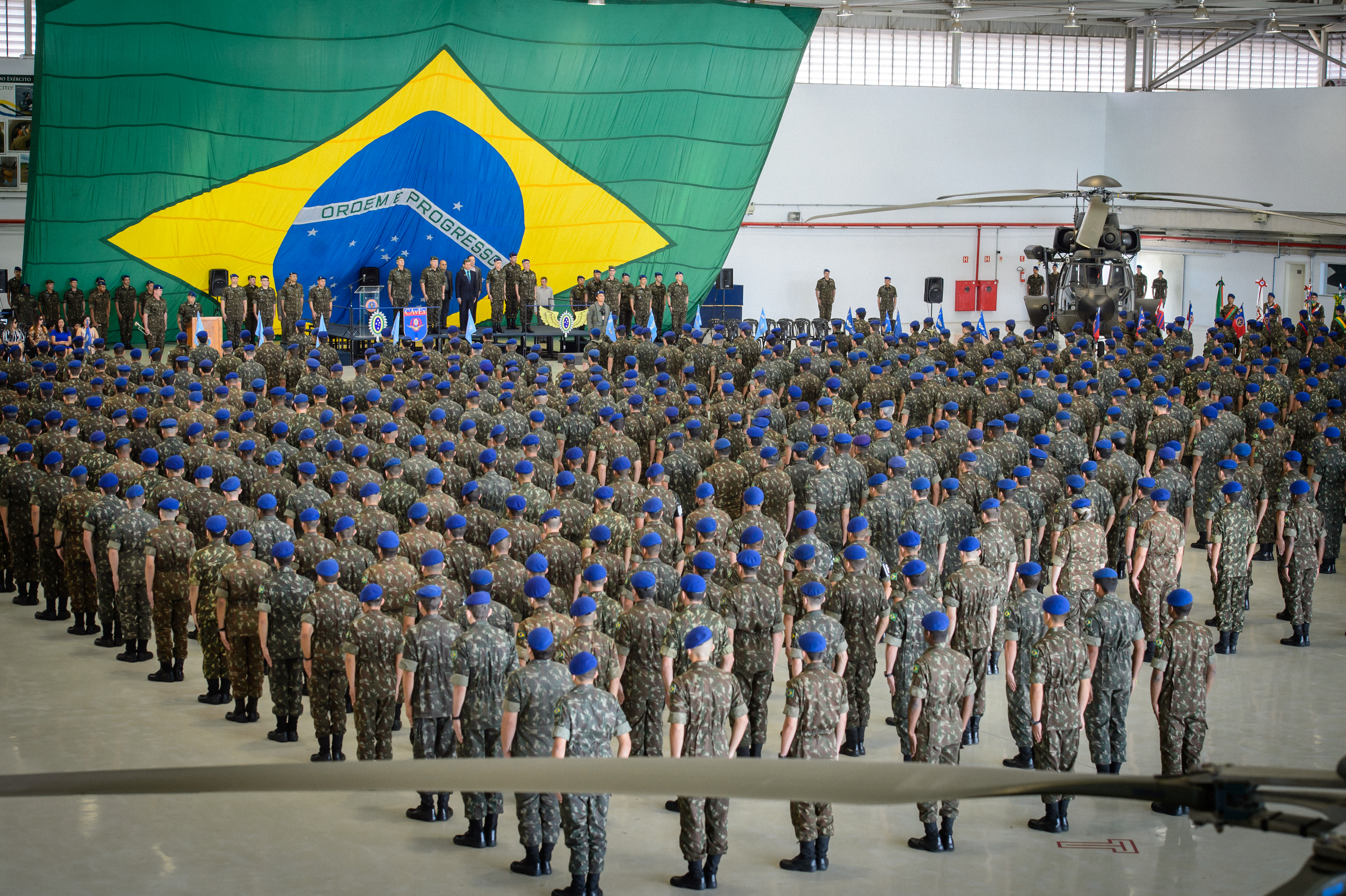
Soldiers from the Taubaté garrison

However, CAvEx does not command the entire Army Aviation. The 3rd and 4th BAvEx, respectively located in Campo Grande and Manaus, are subordinate to the Western and Amazonian Military Commands, respectively, and there is also the Army Aviation Detachment in the Northern Military Command (DstAvEx/CMN) . These battalions, far from Taubaté, still maintain a technical channel with CAvEx. In Brasília there is the Army Aviation Material Directorate (DMAvEx), subordinate to the Army Logistics Command.

The original headquarters of the Command was located in Brasília, in 1989. The airmobile infantry brigade was created in Goiânia. In 1991 the headquarters of the command was transferred to Taubaté, in the Paraíba Valley. The city has a strategic position on the Rio-São Paulo axis, close to the aeronautical industry and research center (Embraer, Helibras and the Department of Aerospace Science and Technology) and the new location of the airmobile brigade, which was created by converting the existing infantry brigade in Caçapava. Due to its position in the central nucleus of Brazil, the Army Aviation and the airmobile brigade formed part of the army's Rapid Action Forces, to easily operate in any part of the Brazil.

=== Aviation battalions ===
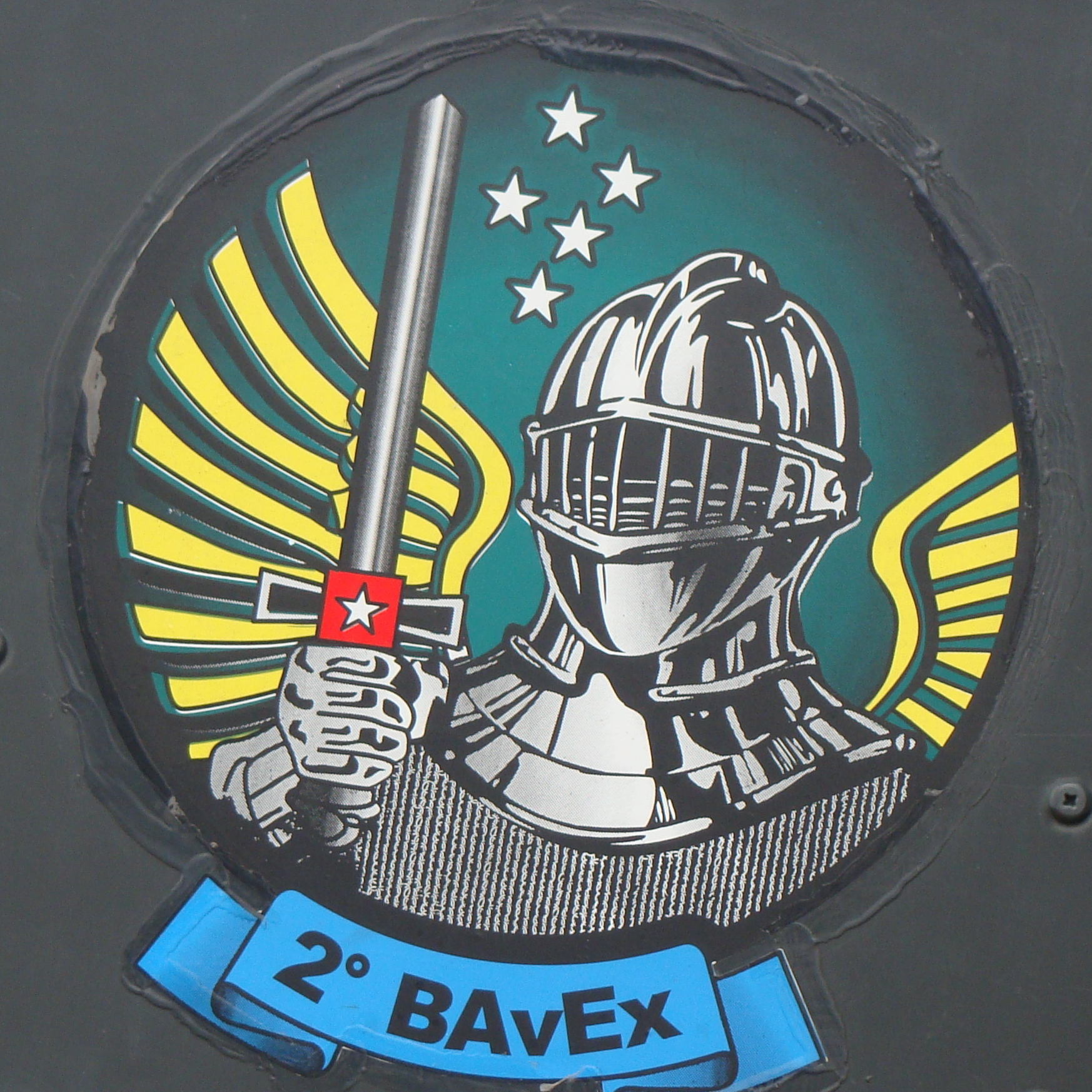
2nd BAvEx patch

The operational units, the battalions, were called squadrons until 2005. (Note: A 1st BAvEx was created in 1986 and replaced by the 1st Helicopter Battalion in 1990, which in turn gave way to the 1st Army Aviation Group in 1993. The group had three squadrons, the first with the HA -1 Fennec and the others with the HM-1 Pantera. The squadrons continued to exist after the extinction of the 1st Group in 1997 and gave rise to the current battalions (Moralez 2022).) (Note: "Squadron" is a term similar to that used in the Brazilian Air Force, but it created confusion in the army, where it also means subunits equivalent to a company. See Pedrosa, Fernando Velôzo Gomes (2022). "Organização das forças do Exército Brasileiro na República". Dicionário de história militar do Brasil (1822-2022): volume II. Rio de Janeiro: Autografia. ISBN 978-85-518-4910-1. p. 390-391.) They are the 1st (Falcões), 2nd (Guerreiros), 3rd (Panteras) and 4th (Onças), respectively created in 1986, 1993, 1993 and 1997.

Transport and attack aircraft are combined into the same operational units, imitating post-Vietnam War Americans. Each battalion must have two general employment squadrons (esquadrilhas de emprego geral, EHEG) and one for reconnaissance and attack (esquadrilha de reconhecimento e ataque, EHRA), in addition to one for maintenance and supply and one for command and support. The greater proportion of transport aircraft highlights the battalion's primary support, rather than attack, role. In reality, only the 1st and 3rd battalions had reconnaissance and attack squadrons in 2020.

The 1st battalion, for example, had one EHRA with the HA-1 and two EHEG in 2018, respectively with the HM-1 Pantera and HM-4 Jaguar. Each squadron has three helicopter platoons. At EHRA, each platoon has five helicopters, one for the commander and the others organized into two sections of two helicopters each. Within the section, one helicopter belongs to the section commander and another to his "Wingman" (Ala).

There was an intention to use aviation in the Amazon since its creation. Some aircraft used in Operation Traíra remained in the North, transferred to Manaus, and formed the Amazônia detachment in 1992, expanded to the 4th Squadron in 1997. It can transport troops from the 1st Jungle Infantry Battalion, based in the same city, which received the designation "airmobile" in 2005. In 2003, it was planned to transfer the 3rd Squadron to the Western Military Command and create two squadrons, one in the South and the other in the Northeast. What materialized was the transfer of the 3rd, carried out gradually from 2009 onwards from Taubaté to its new headquarters in Campo Grande. Despite this decentralization, in 2018 around 76% of employees remained in Taubaté. In 2022, two HM-4 Jaguars were transferred to Belém to form a detachment in the Northern Military Command.

Aircraft distribution in 2023
Organization	Place	HA-1A Fennec	HM-1A Pantera	HM-2 Black Hawk	HM-3 Cougar	HM-4 Jaguar	Total
CIAvEx	Taubaté	16					16
1st BAvEx	Taubaté	12				7	19
2nd BAvEx	Taubaté		16		4		20
3rd BAvEx	Campo Grande	6	6		4		16
4th BAvEx	Manaus		9	4		6	19
DstAvEx/CMN	Belém		3			2	5
Total		34	34	4	8	15	95

=== Instruction center ===
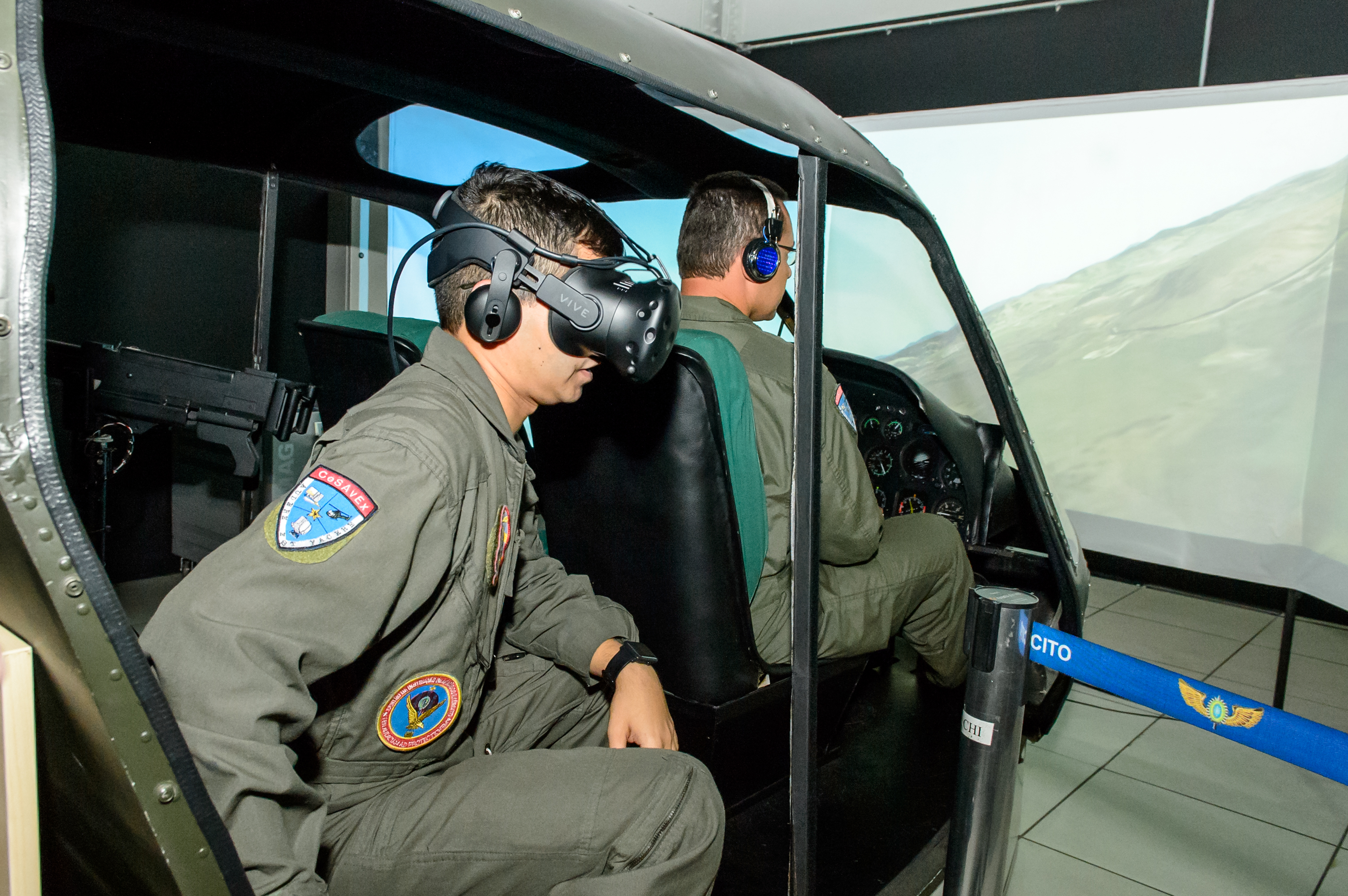
CIAvEx's flight simulator

Aerial activity is complex and requires a high degree of specialization. CIAvEx trains army aviation human resources: pilot officers and sergeants from various specialties (flight mechanics, maintenance technicians, air traffic controllers, meteorologists, search and rescue elements, aerodrome firefighters etc.). Further down the hierarchy, soldiers incorporated through conscription are trained within their own units. Before joining AvEx, officers are trained at the Military Academy of Agulhas Negras and, as lieutenants, serve for a minimum period in land units. In civil aviation, training to fly helicopters is expensive, costing R$80 to R$100 thousand in São Paulo in 2010. Some AvEx pilots continue to enter the civil aviation job market at the end of their service in the army, taking advantage of the cheaper route for qualification.

CIAvEx is an educational establishment with more than 40 courses and internships in 2020, from technical courses to undergraduate and postgraduate courses. It has its own Training Helicopter Squadron (Pegasus), operating the Equilo as a standard vehicle, and tools such as flight simulators, augmented reality and virtual reality to reduce flight hour costs of helicopters. In pilot training, every practical phase is preceded by the same mission carried out in the simulator. Returning to CIAvEx for additional training is normal throughout one's career. Pilots move from basic training to weapons, tactics, and leadership of a helicopter platoon. After training at the Officer Improvement School, they can return to CIAvEx and qualify for staff or battalion command and service as liaison officers in brigades, divisions and Military Commands.

=== Maintenance and logistics ===
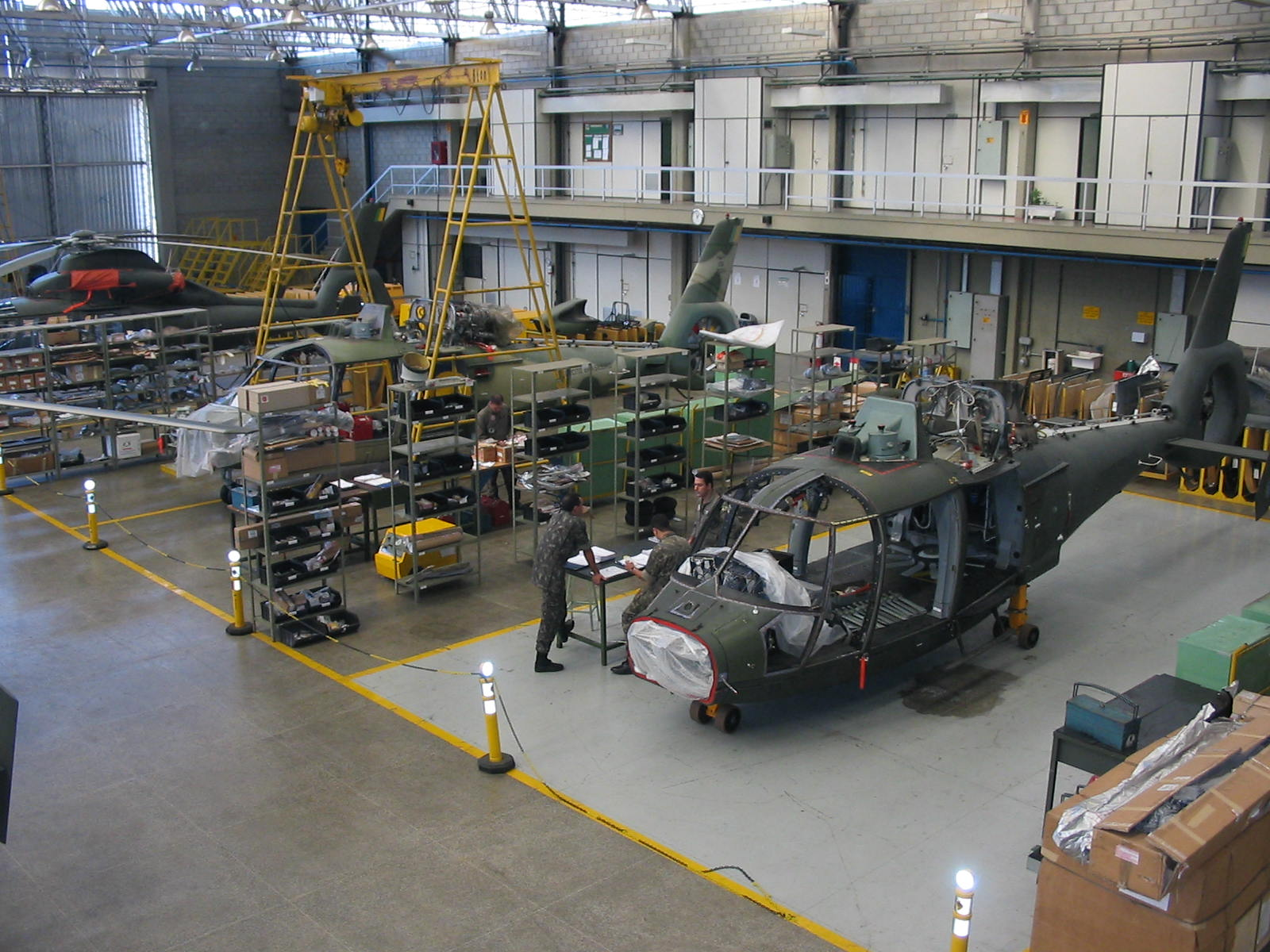
Maintenance and Supply Battalion Hangar (BMS)

AvEx logistics has the BMS as its protagonist, responsible for storing and distributing the supply. Logistics planning, integration and control are the responsibility of DMavEx. CAvEx mediates this board and the BMS. BAvT carries out acquisitions in the domestic market at the request of BMS. Some purchases on the domestic market, mainly chemical materials, are carried out in a decentralized manner by the 3rd and 4th BAvEx. Acquisitions on the foreign market go through the Permanent Commission of the Brazilian Army in Washington (CEBW) or the Special Depot (DE), which has a contract with Airbus Helicopters. The DE minimizes lead times and guarantees direct contracts with the manufacturers, but the need for prior budget forecasting, committed to Airbus Helicopters, delays the fulfillment of orders during economic crises.

At BMS, part of the maintenance work is outsourced. The battalion's goal is to keep 70% of helicopters available for immediate use, but historically bureaucratic difficulties and dependence on foreign technology causes disruptions in the logistics chain, with cascading effects of delays in the maintenance cycle. In 2011, in a scenario of low availability of resources in the entire Armed Forces, a dossier from the Ministry of Defense indicated that only 39 of the 78 Army Aviation helicopters were operational. In 2018 the HM-3 Cougar fleet reached 75% availability, a figure not reached since 2008.

=== Other components ===
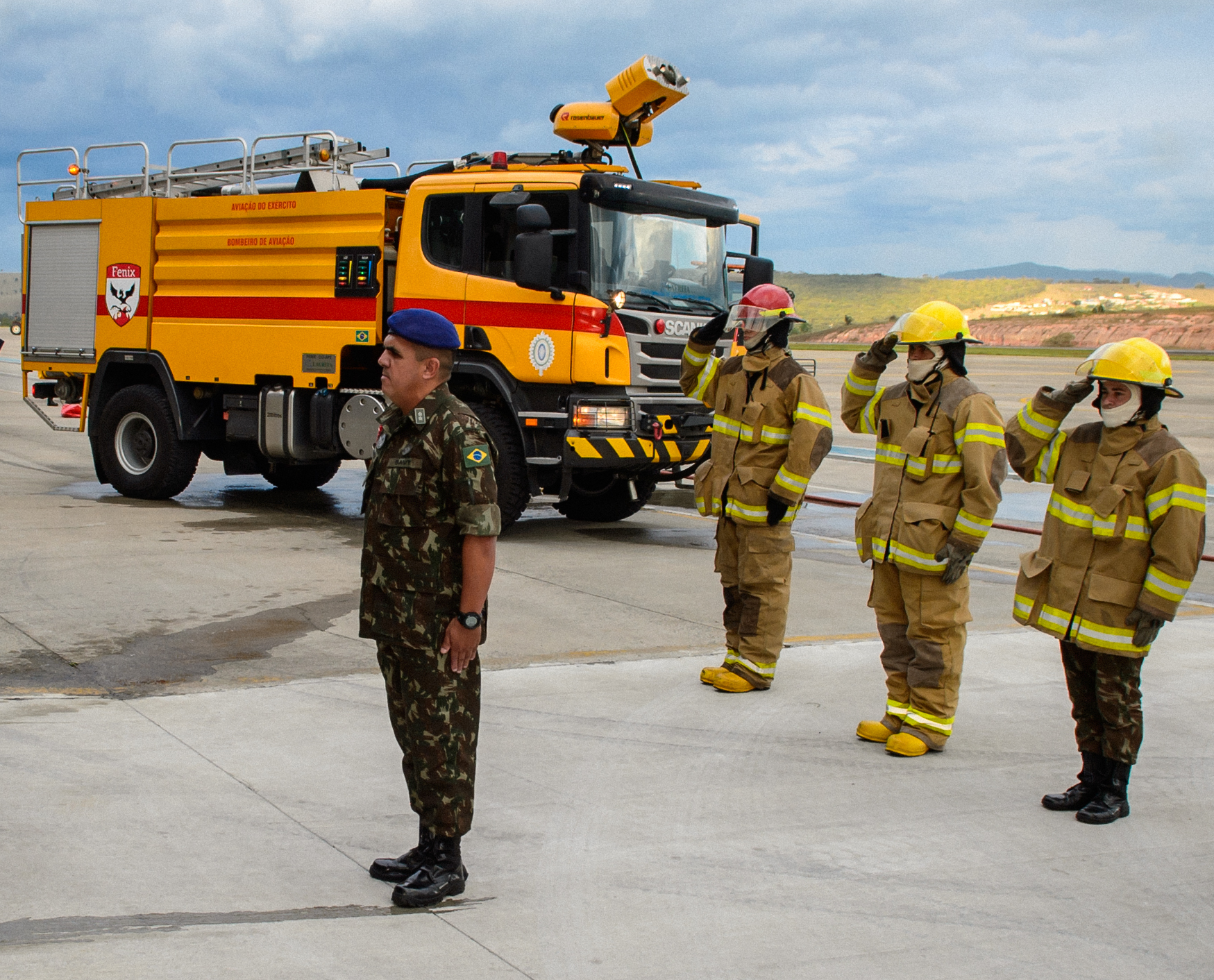
BAvT fire service

The Taubaté Aviation Base is an administrative and infrastructure management body, with a staff of around 800 military personnel. It maintains the Aerodrome Division, which operates the control tower, air traffic control and fire protection service. Throughout the complex in Taubaté it provides security, meals, medical treatment, the transit hotel and the management of budgetary, financial and patrimonial resources. When AvEx leaves its headquarters, BAvT sets up the new command post and continues to provide accommodation, meals, security and other services. In this situation, it sets up and operates the field aerodrome together with the Army Aviation Communications Company. Created in 2014, the company is responsible for command and control links.

CAvEx has in its Special Projects Section the Testing and Evaluation Group (GEA), which advises on modernization and equipment purchase decisions. Pilots qualified for flight testing are gathered in this group and can test aircraft and systems before their acquisition.
