= 1º Batalhão de Forças Especiais =

1st Special Forces Battalion
- 1º Batalhão de Forças Especiais
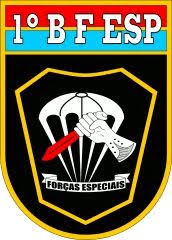
- Coat of arms of the 1st SF Battalion
- Active: 1983; 43 years ago
- Country: Brazil
- Branch: Brazilian Army
- Type: Special Forces
- Size: Unknown
- Part of: Special Operations Command
- Garrison/HQ: Goiânia
- Nickname: "FE"
- Mottos: Qualquer missão, em qualquer lugar, a qualquer hora, de qualquer maneira. (English: "Any mission, in any place, at any time, by any means.")
- Engagements: Araguaia Guerrilla War; Operation Traira; United Nations Stabilisation Mission in Haiti; Security operations in Rio de Janeiro

The 1º Batalhão de Forças Especiais (1º B F Esp) (English: 1st Special Forces Battalion), also named António Dias Cardoso Battalion, is a special forces unit of the Brazilian Army.

== History ==
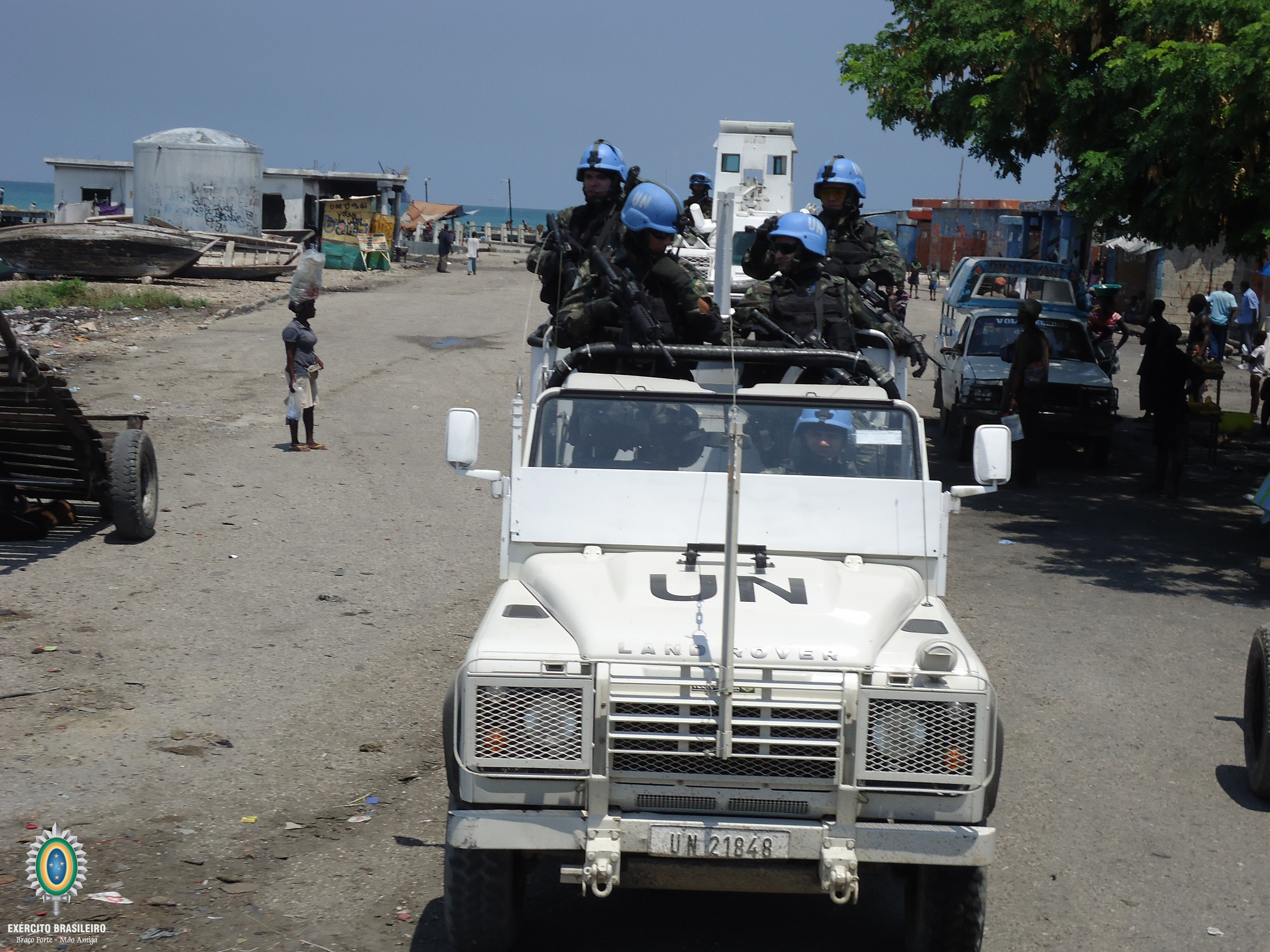
FEs and Comandos troops patrol Port-au-Prince during MINUSTAH.

The Battalion was initially formed in 1957 as a jungle rescue unit. However, in 1968 it was reorganized as a special forces unit. In 1983 the unit was expanded and placed under the parachute infantry brigade structure.

In 1991, elements of the 1st BFEsp along with participated in Operation Traira, an action taken by the Brazilian Army in response to an attack made in February by the Revolutionary Armed Forces of Colombia against a semi-permanent army position in the Taraíra River. BFEsp soldiers killed seven FARC soldiers, imprisoned an unspecified amount and recovered military equipment stolen during the original February 1991 ambush.

In November 1991, this operation was followed by operation Perro Loco, intended to dissuade FARC activity on the Brazilian side of the border.

During MINUSTAH, a force of around 20 men from the 1st Special Forces Battalion and 1st Commando Actions Battalion made up the Destacamento de Operações de Paz (Peace Operations Detachment) or Dopaz, a special operations unit responsible for high-risk missions such as special reconnaissance and direct action against leaderships of Haitian gangs, as well as leading the UN raids on neighborhoods such as Bel Air, Cité Militaire and Cité Soleil from 2005 to 2007. According to Brazilian SF General Sergio Schwingel, Dopaz's role in Haiti led to the UN creating a doctrine for the usage of special forces in peacekeeping operations worldwide.

== Role ==
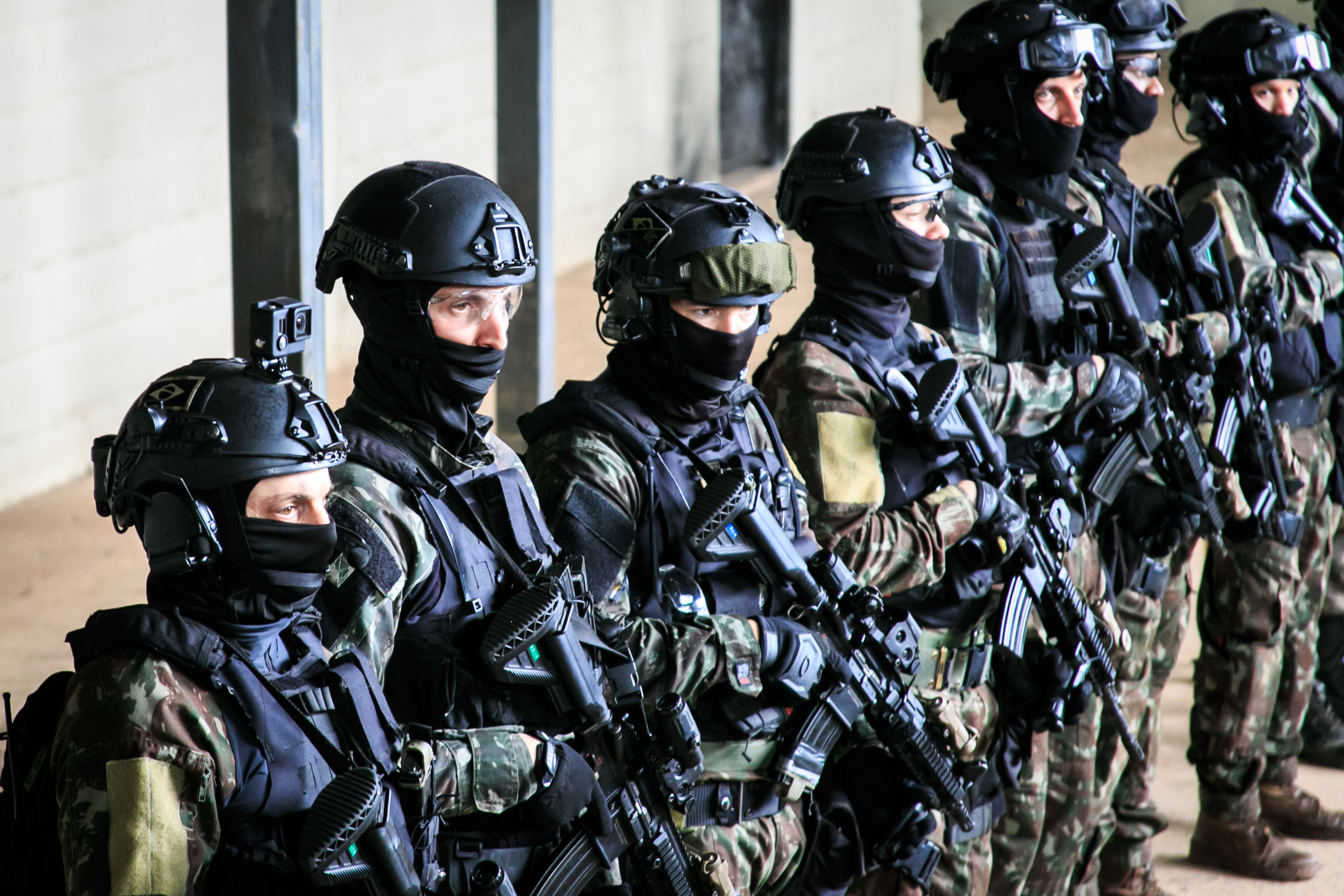
FE servicemen in 2018

The Battalion's mission is similar to that of the Green Beret units; however, because they have the CT mission, they have modified their organization to more closely follow Britain's Special Air Service and America's Delta Force. The SF Battalion falls within the Army's Special Operations Command and is located in Goiânia.

The battalion is capable of conducting its missions independently from or in conjunction with conventional forces. Battalion troops are trained in jungle warfare at the Army's CIGS jungle warfare school and in amphibious, mountain warfare, airborne, airmobile and HAHO/HALO operations. They are also prepared for long-range reconnaissance in addition to their CT operations.

== Equipment ==
Name	Origin	Type
Glock 17	Austria	Pistol
Glock 21	Austria	Pistol
Heckler & Koch USP	Germany	Pistol
IMBEL M1911A1	Brazil	Pistol
Taurus M975	Brazil	Pistol
Taurus Mod.21	Brazil	Pistol
Heckler & Koch VP70	Germany	Machine pistol
IMBEL ParaFAL	Brazil	Battle rifle
Heckler & Koch G3A3	Germany	Battle rifle
IMBEL IA2	Brazil	Assault rifle
IMBEL MD97	Brazil	Assault rifle
Heckler & Koch G36C	Germany	Carbine
Heckler & Koch 416	Germany	Assault rifle
Heckler & Koch HK33A2	Germany	Assault rifle
Heckler & Koch HK417	Germany	Battle rifle/DMR
HK53A5	Germany	Assault rifle
FAMAS F1 Commando	France	Assault rifle
Colt M4	United States	Carbine
Norinco Type 56	China	Assault rifle
Franchi SPAS-15	Italy	Shotgun
Benelli M3 Super 90	Italy	Shotgun
Benelli M4 Super 90	Italy	Shotgun
Mossberg 500 Cruiser	United States	Shotgun
Remington 870 MK1	United States	Shotgun
IMI Uzi	Israel	Submachine gun
IMI Micro Uzi	Israel	Submachine gun
Heckler & Koch MP5SD6	Germany	Submachine gun
Heckler & Koch MP5KA4	Germany	Submachine gun
Taurus M972	Brazil	Submachine gun
FN Minimi Para MK3	Belgium	Light machine gun
FN MAG	Belgium	General-purpose machine gun
HK21E	Germany	General-purpose machine gun
Barrett M82A3	United States	Anti-materiel sniper rifle
PGM Ultima Ratio	France	Anti-materiel sniper rifle
Heckler & Koch PSG1	Germany	Sniper rifle
SIG Saue SSG 3000	Switzerland	Sniper rifle
Remington MSR	United States	Sniper rifle
M24 Sniper Weapon System	United States	Sniper rifle
M110 SASS	United States	Sniper rifle
M79 grenade launcher	United States	Grenade launcher
AT4	Sweden	Rocket launcher
Carl Gustaf M3	Sweden	Recoilless rifle
60mm Commando Mortar	France	Mortar
L16 81mm mortar	United Kingdom	Mortar
Hydroar T1M1	Brazil	Flame-thrower
