= Special operations command =

A special operations command top-level military headquarters responsible for planning, training, and equipping elite forces for special operations. These commands ensure elite units across different branches (army, navy, air force) work cohesively.

It may refer to any of these military or police organizations:

- Special Operations Command (Australia)
- Special Operations Command (Brazil)
- Special Operations Command (Brunei)
- Special Operations Command (Canada), see Canadian Special Operations Forces Command
- Special Operations Command (Colombia), see Colombian National Police Special Operations Command
- Special Operations Command (Denmark)
- Special Operations Command (Germany), see Kommando Spezialkräfte
- Special Operations Command (France), see Commandement des Opérations Spéciales of the French Armed Forces
- Special Operations Command (Greece), see 13th Special Operations Command of the Hellenic Army
- Special Operations Command (Indonesia), also known as Komando Operasi Khusus Tentara Nasional Indonesia.
- Special Operations Command (Maldives)
- Special Operations Command (Malaysia)
- Special Operations Component Command (New Zealand)
- Special Operations Command (Pakistan), see Special Service Group of the Pakistan Armed Forces
- Special Operations Command (Philippines)
- Special Operations Command (Singapore)
- Special Operations Command (Spain)
- United States Special Operations Command

- United States Army Special Operations Command
- United States Air Force Special Operations Command
- United States Naval Special Warfare Command
- United States Marine Corps Forces Special Operations Command
- Joint Special Operations Command

== See also ==
- SOC (disambiguation)
- SOCOM (disambiguation)
- Special Forces Command (disambiguation)
- Special Warfare Command (disambiguation)
- Special Operations Group (disambiguation)
