= Soun =

Soun may refer to:

- Hōjō Sōun (1456–1519), Japanese samurai
- Soun Veasna (born 1994), Cambodian football player
- Soun Tendo, a Ranma ½ character

== See also ==
- Sound (disambiguation)
- Sou (disambiguation)
