= Socs =

Socs or SOCS may refer to:

- Senior chief special warfare operator, a Navy Seals rating
- Single overhead camshaft, a type of internal combustion engine
- Socs, one of the rival gangs in S.E. Hinton's novel The Outsiders.
- Socs subculture in the United States in the 1950s
- Suppressor of cytokine signalling, family of genes involved in inhibiting the JAK-STAT signaling pathway
- Symposium on Combinatorial Search, international computer science conference
- System on a chip, an integrated circuit that includes all components of a computer or other electronic system

== See also ==
- SOC (disambiguation)
- School of Computer Science (disambiguation)
