= MD2 =

MD2 or MD-2 may refer to:

- MD2 (file format)
- MD2 (hash function)
- MD-2 (immunology)

== See also ==
- MD2 low-profile PCI card
- IMBEL MD2 Rifle
- Maryland's 2nd congressional district
- Maryland Route 2
