= SOC =

SOC, soc, Soc, or SoC may refer to:

== Science and technology ==
- Information security operations center, in an organization, a centralized unit that deals with computer security issues
- Selectable output control
- Separation of concerns, a program design principle in computer science and software engineering
- Service-oriented communications
- Service-oriented computing, another term for service-oriented architecture
- Soil organic carbon, see Soil carbon
- Solid oxide cell, an electrochemical conversion device operating either in SOFC, SOEC, or rSOC mode
- Spin–orbit coupling
- State of charge, for batteries
- Store-operated calcium channel
- Super optimal broth with catabolite repression, a bacterial growth medium
- Superior olivary complex
- System on chip (SoC), in electronic design
- System organ class, an organizational division in the MedDRA dictionary

== Associations and societies ==
- Society (abbr.: "soc.")
- Scottish Ornithologists' Club
- Scouts of China
- Syriac Orthodox Church
- Serbian Orthodox Church
- Société des Ornithologistes du Canada, the French name of the Society of Canadian Ornithologists
- Society of Operating Cameramen, the original name for the Society of Camera Operators
- Special Olympics Canada
- Syrian Opposition Coalition, better known as the National Coalition

== Businesses ==
- SOC Films, a film company founded by Pakistani filmmaker and journalist Sharmeen Obaid-Chinoy
- Sirte Oil Company
- Social overhead capital
- South Oil Company
- System and organization controls, a suite of reports produced during an audit

== Military ==
- Curtiss SOC Seagull, a US Navy scout observation seaplane produced by Curtiss, first in service in 1935
- Special operations command, various military and police organizations

== Mathematics ==
- Second-order condition, a mathematical condition that distinguishes maxima and minima from other stationary points
- Self-organized criticality, a property of dynamical systems in physics

== Transport ==
- Adisumarmo International Airport (IATA: SOC), Indonesia
- Southend Central railway station (National Rail station code: SOC), Essex, England

== Other uses ==
- School of Communication, a school in American University
- Security operations center, in an organization, a centralized unit that deals with security issues
- The Settlers of Catan, a multiplayer board game
- Shippers Owned Container, intermodal container owned by the shipper or receiver instead of by the shipping line
- Soc (subculture), a 1950s precursor to the preppy look
- Sound of Contact, a British-based rock band
- S.T.A.L.K.E.R.: Shadow of Chernobyl, a video game
- Standard Occupational Classification System, a system of the United States Department of Labor
- Standard of care, medical or psychological treatment guideline, and can be general or specific
  - E.g., the Standards of Care for the Health of Transgender and Gender Diverse People
- Statement of claim, a legal document on which one states a cause of action
- Strategic Organizing Center, a group of United States labor unions
- Stream of consciousness (disambiguation), a writing or psychological style with disjointed thoughts
- Swedish Open Championships, an annual table tennis tournament
- soc.*, one of the Big 8 (Usenet) hierarchies

== See also ==
- Socs (disambiguation)
- Sock (disambiguation)
- SOCOM (disambiguation)
