= Special Warfare Command =

Special Warfare Command may refer to:

- Republic of Korea Army Special Warfare Command
- United States Naval Special Warfare Command
- Naval Special Warfare Command (Thailand)
- Royal Thai Army Special Warfare Command

== See also ==
- Special Operations Command (disambiguation)
- Special Forces Command (disambiguation)
