= Conscious (disambiguation) =

Conscious is the state or quality of awareness.

Conscious may also refer to:

- Conscious (Broods album), 2016
- Conscious (Guy Sebastian album), 2017
- "Conscious" (Guy Sebastian song)
- "Conscious" (Alias episode)

== See also ==
- Consciousness (disambiguation)
