= Special Forces Command =

Special Forces Command may refer to a number of military units, including:

- Special Forces Command (Croatia)
- Special Forces Command (Cyprus)
- Special Forces Command (Germany)
- Special Forces Command (Indonesia)
- Special Forces Command (Sweden)
- Special Forces Command (Switzerland)
- Special Forces Command (Turkey)
- Special Forces Command (Uganda)
- 1st Special Forces Command (United States) Special Forces command structure of the United States Army Green Berets

== See also ==
- Special Operations Command (disambiguation)
- Special Warfare Command (disambiguation)
- Special Forces Group (disambiguation)
