= Stream of consciousness (disambiguation) =

Stream of consciousness is a narrative mode used in literature.

Stream(s) of Consciousness may also refer to:

== Music ==
- Stream of Consciousness (Vision Divine album), 2004
- Stream of Consciousness (Wings of the Isang album), 2016
- Stream of Consciousness, an album by Still Time, or the title song, 2007
- Streams of Consciousness, an album by Max Roach and Dollar Brand (Abdullah Ibrahim), 1977
- "Stream of Consciousness" (instrumental), by Dream Theater, 2003
- "Stream of Consciousness", a song by Kreator from Extreme Aggression, 1989
- "Stream of Consciousness", a song by Textures from Drawing Circles, 2006

== Other uses ==
- Stream of consciousness (psychology), a concept in psychology
- Stream of Consciousness, a fictional flowing water in Pixar's Inside Out 2
- "Stream of Consciousness" (The Outer Limits), a television episode

== See also ==
- Consciousness (disambiguation)
