= Special Operations Group =

Special Operations Group may refer to:

== Australia ==
- Victoria Police Special Operations Group of the Victoria Police (Australia)
- Tasmania Police Special Operations Group of the Tasmania Police (Australia)
- State Protection Group, New South Wales

== India ==
- Special Operations Group (Jammu and Kashmir), of Jammu and Kashmir, India
- Special Operation Group (Odisha)
- Special Operations Group (Punjab)

== Spain ==
- Grupo Especial de Operaciones of Spain
- Grupo de Operaciones Especiales (Spain), of the Spanish Army

== United Kingdom ==
- Specialist Operations, London Police
- Metropolitan Police Specialist Firearms Command, London Police

== United States ==
- Special Operations Group of Special Activities Center in the American Central Intelligence Agency
- Groups within the United States Special Operations Command
- 27th Special Operations Group, a unit of the United States Air Force
- 352rd Special Operations Group, a unit of the United States Air Force
- 353rd Special Operations Group, a unit of the United States Air Force

== Other countries ==
- Special Operations Group (Argentina), a commando-like unit of the Argentine Air Force
- GOE (Brazil), Special Operations Group of Brazil
- Canadian Special Operations Forces Command
- Grupo de Operaciones Policiales Especiales (Chile) of Chile
- Special Operations Group of Estonia
- Special Operations Group (Czech Republic)
- Raggruppamento Operativo Speciale of Italy
- Special Operations Group (Japan), former name of the group of Japan
- Grupo de Operaciones Especiales (Mexico)
- Naval Special Operations Group of the Philippine Navy
- Grupo de Operações Especiais (Portugal)
- Special Operations Group (Sweden)

== See also ==
- Special Forces Group (disambiguation)
- Special Operations Command (disambiguation)
- Special Operations Unit (disambiguation)
