= Sou =

Sou or SOU may refer to:

== People ==
- Sou (surname), a Cantonese romanization of the Chinese surname Su
- William Sousa Bridgeforth (1907–2004), nicknamed "Sou", American Negro league baseball team owner

== Codes ==
- Southampton Airport (IATA code), England
- Southampton Central railway station (National Rail code), England
- Southern Railway (U.S.) (railroad reporting mark)
- Southern Thai language (ISO 639-3 language code)

== SOU ==
- Special Operations Unit (disambiguation)
- Southern Oregon University, United States
- Statens offentliga utredningar, an official series of reports of committees appointed by the Swedish Government
- Sound of Urchin, American eclectic alternative rock band
- Southland railway station, Melbourne

== Other uses ==
- Sou (French coin), various French coins
- Penny (Canadian coin), colloquially called a sou in Quebec
- Sou (pastry), a type of food pastry
- Sou (album), a studio album by Marcelo Camelo
- Sou (film), a Canadian two-minute mobile short for video cell phones
