= Special Forces Group =

Special Forces Group may refer to:

- Special Forces Group (Australia)
- Special Forces Group (Belgium)
- Special Forces Group (Guinea)
- Special Forces Group (Japan)
- Tunisian military special forces
- Individual groups within the Special Forces (United States Army)

== See also ==
- Special Operations Group (disambiguation)
- Special Forces Command (disambiguation)
