= Special Operations Command (Brazil) =

- Comando de Operações Especiais
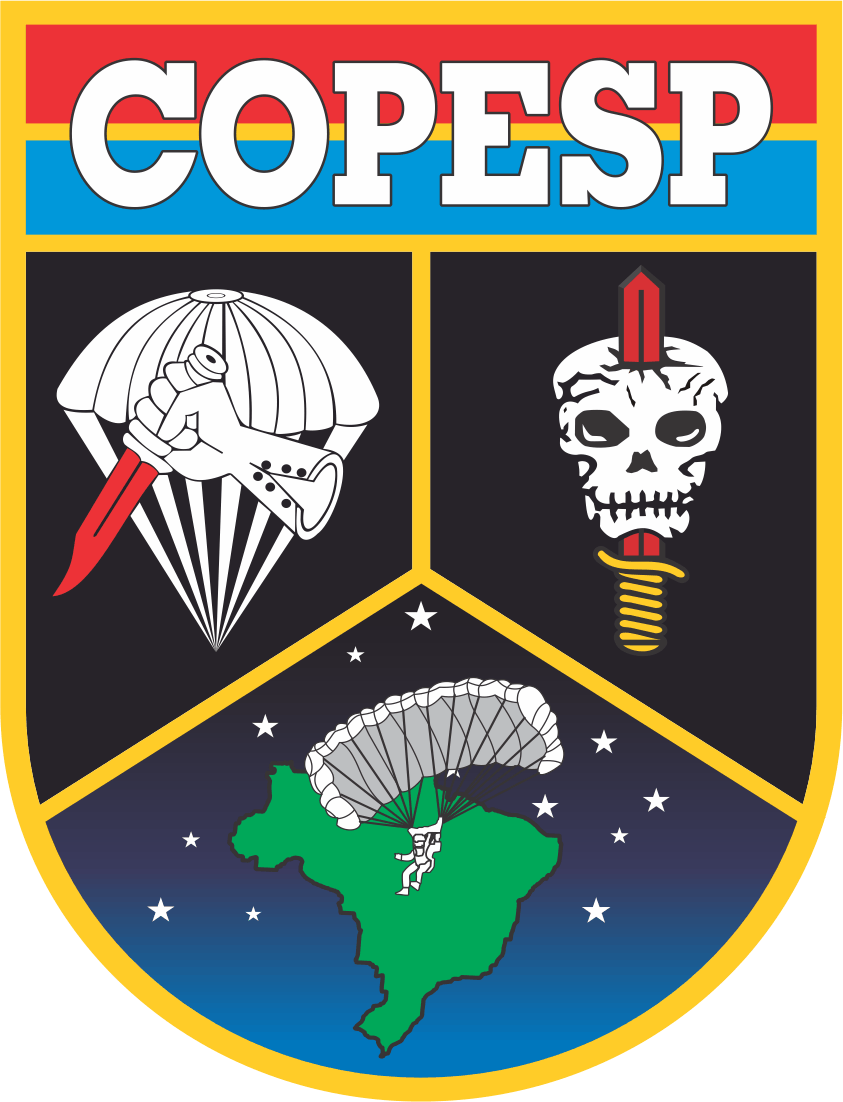
- Active: 27 June 2002; 24 years ago
- Country: Brazil
- Branch: Brazilian Army
- Type: Special forces
- Size: 2,645 (2020)
- Part of: Planalto Military Command
- Garrison/HQ: Goiânia, Goiás
- Nickname: Kids Pretos
- Website: www.copesp.eb.mil.br

Commanders
- Current Commander: Brig. Gen. Andrelucio Ricardo Couto

The Special Operations Command (Portuguese: Comando de Operações Especiais; COPESP) is an elite unit of the Brazilian Army, headquartered in Goiânia and subordinated to the Planalto Military Command and the Land Operations Command. It is a brigade-level unit adapted for guerrilla warfare and counterterrorism, forming part of the Strategic Rapid Action Force, capable of responding to both conventional and unconventional threats. Its two operational units are the 1st Special Forces Battalion and the 1st Commando Actions Battalion.

Among its components, only the Special Operations Training Center, located in Niterói, is outside Goiânia. The 3rd Special Forces Company, based in Manaus, is subordinate to the Amazon Military Command. These components occasionally operate alongside the special forces of other Brazilian Armed Forces branches or police units, although there is no permanent joint command structure.

The first Brazilian special operations course was established in 1957, and the first operational unit in 1968, both within the current Paratrooper Infantry Brigade. These units have historical ties to jungle warfare training and police special forces. The special forces and commandos studied counterinsurgency tactics within the context of the Cold War and the armed struggle against the Brazilian military dictatorship. This focus continued even after redemocratization. During the Araguaia Guerrilla campaign, they applied the principle that "guerrilla warfare is fought with guerrilla tactics". The Amazon region remains a key area of interest for special operations, with plans to use these forces for indirect action against conventional invaders by organizing resistance among the local population. Since the 1990s, special forces have also been employed in securing major events and combating organized crime in Rio de Janeiro. Special operations forces were expanded into a brigade in 2002 when terrorism risk became a public concern. In 2003, the brigade was relocated to Goiânia, in central Brazil, and its current designation dates to 2014.

Army commandos and special forces operators use advanced equipment and undergo more rigorous selection and training than regular military personnel. The commandos, identified by the emblem of a dagger in a skull, are recruited from voluntary service members outside the 1st Command Actions Battalion (1st BAC). They are used for direct combat missions deep in enemy territory. Special Forces (FEs) are recruited from those already certified in the paratrooper and Command Actions courses; the difficult access to the 1st Special Forces Battalion (1st BFEsp) makes it highly prestigious within the institution. Their roles include advanced tasks such as early intelligence gathering and organizing irregular forces. Due to their secretive operations, they are also referred to as "ghosts". Both commandos and FEs rely on specialized vehicles, the Brazilian Air Force, and the Army Aviation for mobility, often entering hostile territory through infiltration. Beyond these two operational battalions, the Special Operations Command includes a Psychological Operations Battalion and a Chemical, Biological, Radiological, and Nuclear Defense Company (DQBRN).

== Context in the Brazilian special forces ==
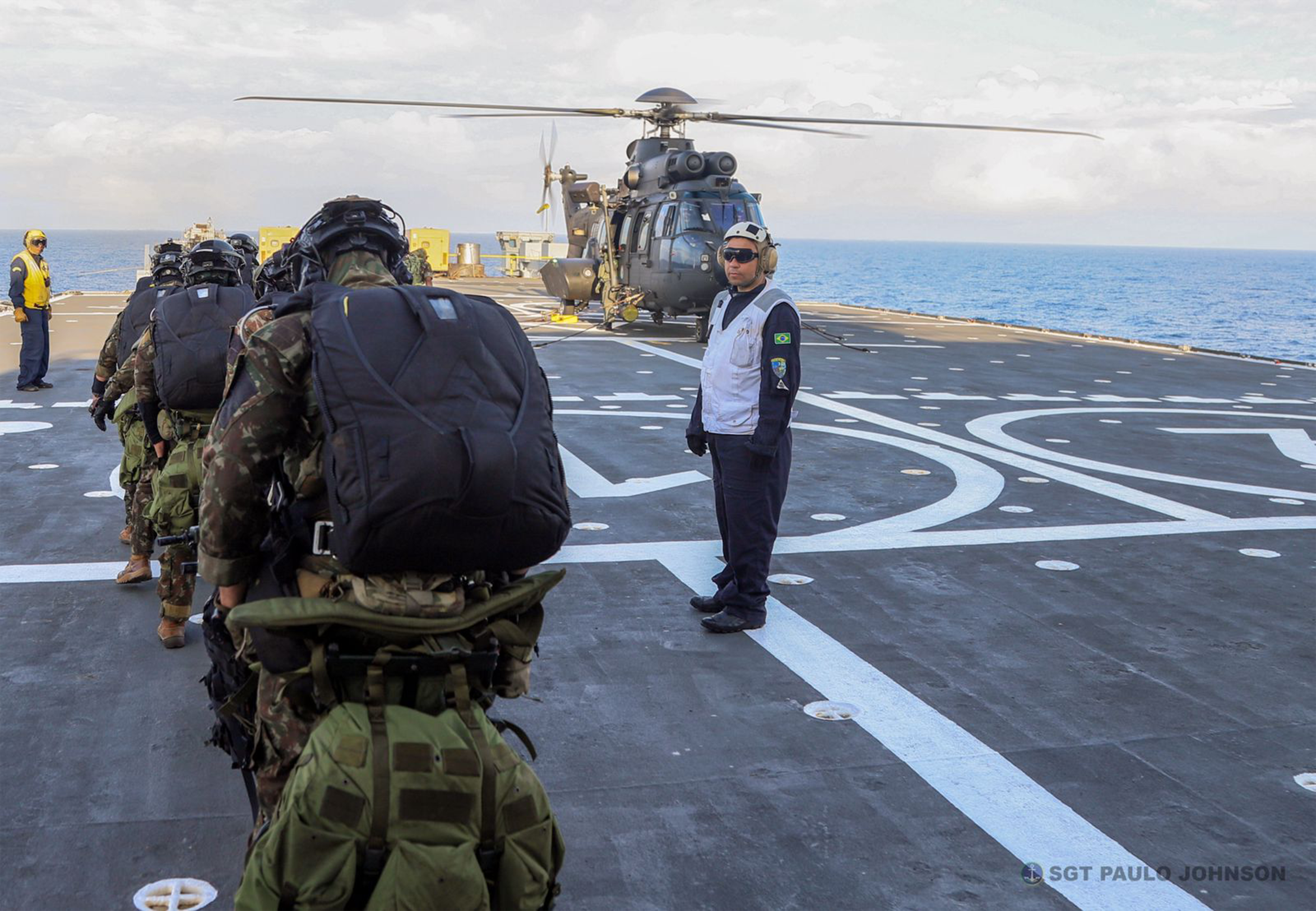
Army special operatives boarding a helicopter aboard the helicopter carrier Atlântico

In the Brazilian Armed Forces, special forces share the use of small groups with specialized training and equipment, supported by advanced intelligence and counterintelligence capabilities. They operate covertly in sensitive areas within limited windows of opportunity, employing two forms of action: direct action, involving violent contact with the enemy, and indirect action, focused on preparing and supporting friendly irregular forces. They infiltrate enemy territory through land, water, or air routes, often operating under vulnerable conditions. These forces have limited access to fire support, typically relying only on air support. They are highly sensitive to enemy counterintelligence and electronic warfare, present significant logistical challenges, and face difficulties in replacing casualties due to the extensive time required to train new operatives.

The Brazilian Navy's special forces include the Combat Divers Group (GRUMEC) and the Marine Corps Special Operations Battalion (Tonelero Battalion), while the Air Force's special unit is the Airborne Rescue Squadron (PARA-SAR). The special forces of the three branches occasionally conduct joint operations. However, there is no permanent joint command for all special forces, such as the United States Special Operations Command.

There have also been instances of joint operations with police special forces, and the two share historical ties. The Special Police Operations Battalion (BOPE) of the Military Police of Rio de Janeiro had a majority of special forces personnel in its original formation, primarily paratroopers experienced in counterinsurgency. However, the roots of police special forces are not exclusively linked to the army. As early as 1932, the Civil Police of Rio de Janeiro had the Special Police, a unit with rigorous selection that served as a precursor to both BOPE and the Special Resources Coordination Unit.

== History ==
=== Creation ===
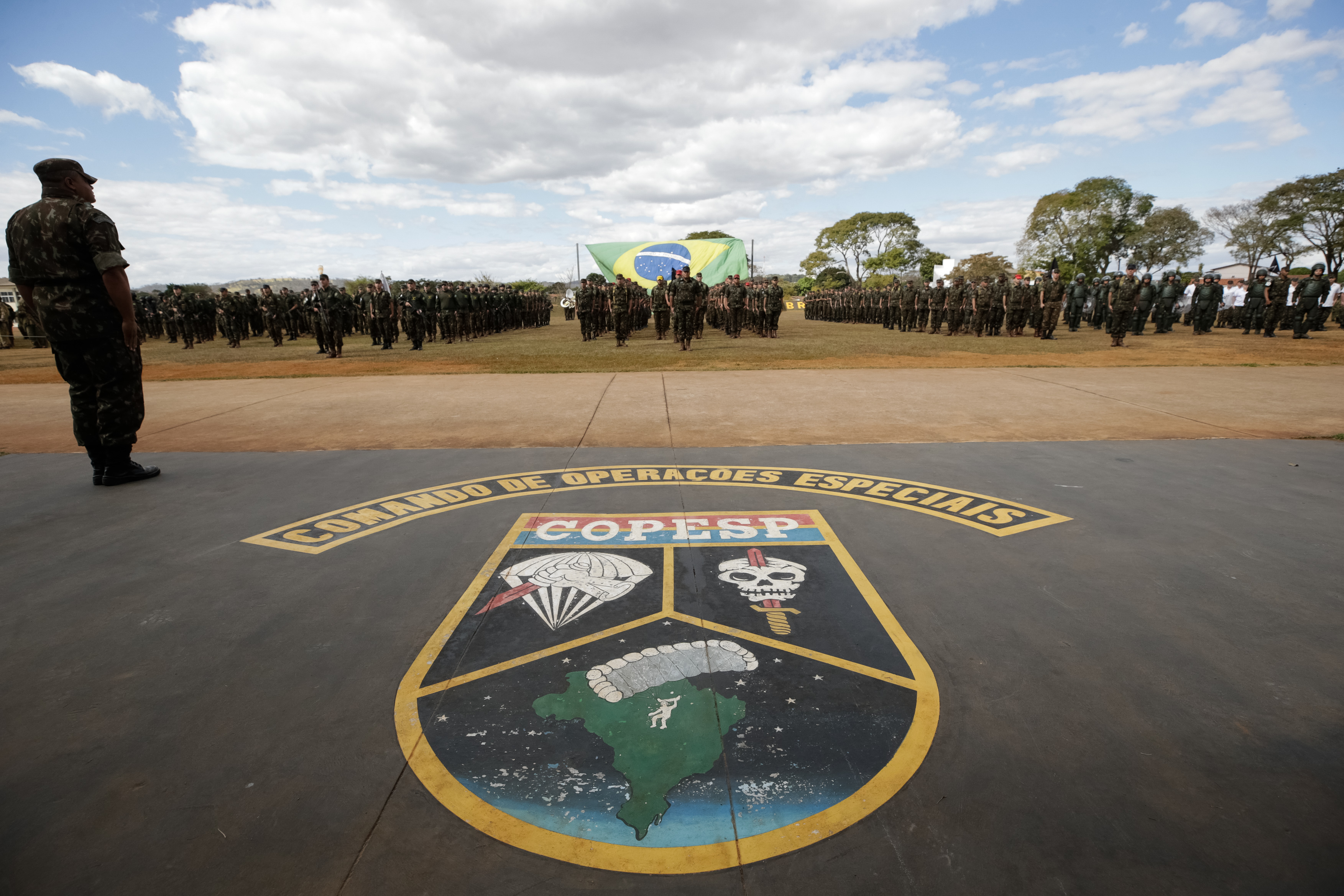
Personnel graduation at the headquarters

The first Special Operations Course in Brazil was created in 1957 within what was then the Aeroterrestrial Division Nucleus, serving as the foundation for the current Commando Actions, Special Forces, and Jungle Operations courses. In 1966, it was split into separate Commando and Special Forces courses. That same year, the traditional Infantry School Regiment introduced a commando course, which was discontinued two years later. During the military reforms under the dictatorship, the nucleus was transformed into a brigade in 1968, incorporating a Special Forces Detachment, which later became a company and was expanded in 1983 into the 1st Special Forces Battalion, including commando and special forces companies.

In a further expansion, the Special Operations Brigade was created in 2002 and renamed the Special Operations Command in 2013. Due to budget constraints, in 2002 the 42nd and 43rd Battalions of the 3rd Motorized Infantry Brigade in Goiás were deactivated, reflecting a broader trend of indirect downsizing within the Brazilian Army. The brigade's original headquarters was in Rio de Janeiro, home to the Paratrooper Infantry Brigade, but the following year it was relocated to Goiânia.

=== Conceived missions ===
The Brazilian Army draws parallels between the current missions of commandos and special forces and historical precedents during the Pernambuco Insurrection in the mid-17th century, particularly the actions of Portuguese military leader Antônio Dias Cardoso. He organized civilians into a resistance force against the Dutch invaders, employing ambushes as a primary tactic. Several other commanders, such as captain Francisco Padilha, also utilized ambushes and guerrilla tactics against the Dutch conventional army. Antônio Dias Cardoso is now honored as the patron of the 1st Special Forces Battalion.

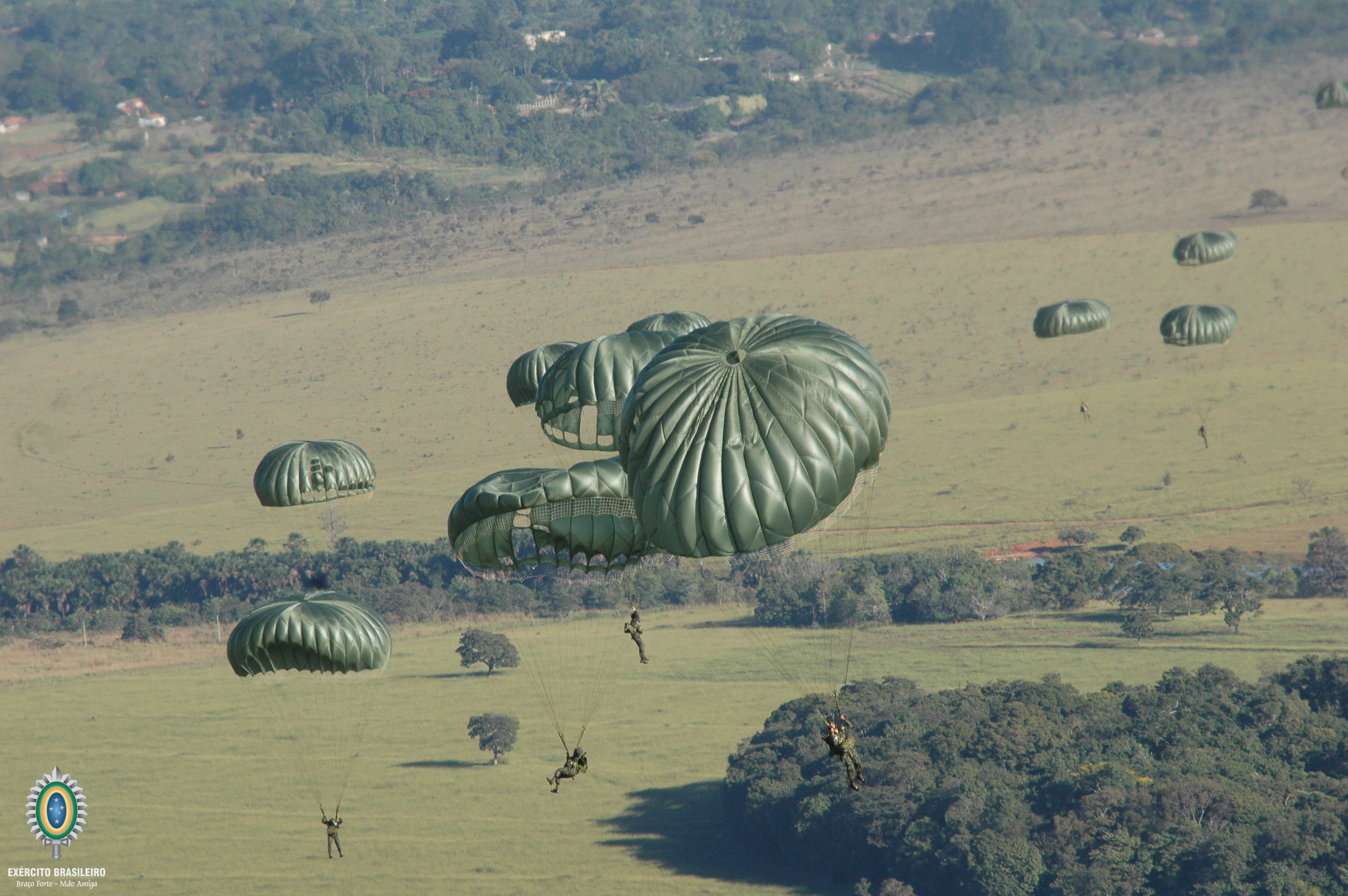
Special forces parachute jump, a continuity with the past in the parachute brigade

In their modern form, commandos and special forces proliferated during World War II and the Cold War. Brazil's first special operations course, established in 1957, initially focused on rescue and recovery operations, influenced by the 1952 crash of the Presidente airplane. Another focus soon emerged: "revolutionary warfare". At the start of the Cold War, military theorists in Brazil and the Western Bloc emphasized special forces for anti-communist counterinsurgency. They envisioned special forces soldiers as saviors of martial values, which were perceived to be eroding with advancements in military technology. These soldiers were also expected to surpass the traditional morality of warfare and fight "dirty" and violently, mimicking their opponents' tactics.

Paratrooper forces in South America were established during this period under American influence and were closely linked to special forces, commandos, and counterinsurgency efforts. An American captain contributed to the creation of the Brazilian course, and after its initial sessions, Brazilian soldiers trained with Rangers and Special Forces in the United States. In Brazil's case, the Armed Forces as a whole sent relatively few personnel to study counterinsurgency at American institutions, and visits by American instructors, such as the Green Berets, were limited, with counterinsurgency taught as just one among several topics. Opinions on the results of this influence are divided: some argued that American doctrinal and practical influence was decisive despite the small numbers, while others claimed it was of little importance, as the Brazilian Army already had its own counterinsurgency doctrine and employed methods distinct from those of other countries in the region.

The focus on counterinsurgency fell to the Paratrooper Brigade, which housed the special forces. In the early 1970s, it turned its efforts to combating the leftist armed struggle against the Brazilian military dictatorship. Terrain that was difficult for regular forces to access, such as jungles and mountains, was considered ideal for guerrilla warfare. The Jungle Warfare Training Center (CIGS), established in 1964, to some extent challenged the paratroopers' dominance over special forces training. While the qualification of special forces personnel and the operational unit remained with the paratroopers, from 1970 to 1978, the training of commandos was conducted at CIGS, in Manaus.

During the Araguaia Guerrilla, the largest counterinsurgency experience of the period, initial operations with conventional forces failed. The insurgents' focus on the jungle was neutralized by applying the principle that "guerrilla warfare is fought with guerrilla tactics". The insurgents were identified through intelligence work and eliminated by small groups of paratroopers and jungle warfare soldiers. Operating covertly and clandestinely, these soldiers often relied on local guides. The guerrilla tactics used against the insurgents in Araguaia were also hypothetically intended for use against a conventional invader in the Amazon. In the 21st century, special forces and jungle warfare units train for a "resistance strategy", infiltrating the jungle and blending with the local population. A significant portion of special operations training is geared toward the Amazonian context.

After 1975, with Brazil's redemocratization and the end of guerrilla movements, the Paratrooper Brigade shifted its focus back to conventional warfare. However, "combat against subversion" continued to be studied by commandos, special forces, and paratroopers. In this way, the army maintained a counter-guerrilla capability even after dismantling the repressive DOI-CODI apparatus. In 2020, Operation Mantiqueira, a special operations exercise targeting a clandestine armed organization, included a fictional scenario that alluded to leftist organizations. The army denied any political or ideological connotation in the simulation. Interest in special operations for conventional warfare persisted, reinforced by the study of the Falklands War. Special forces became a priority destination for resources and were integrated as part of the Rapid Action Forces.

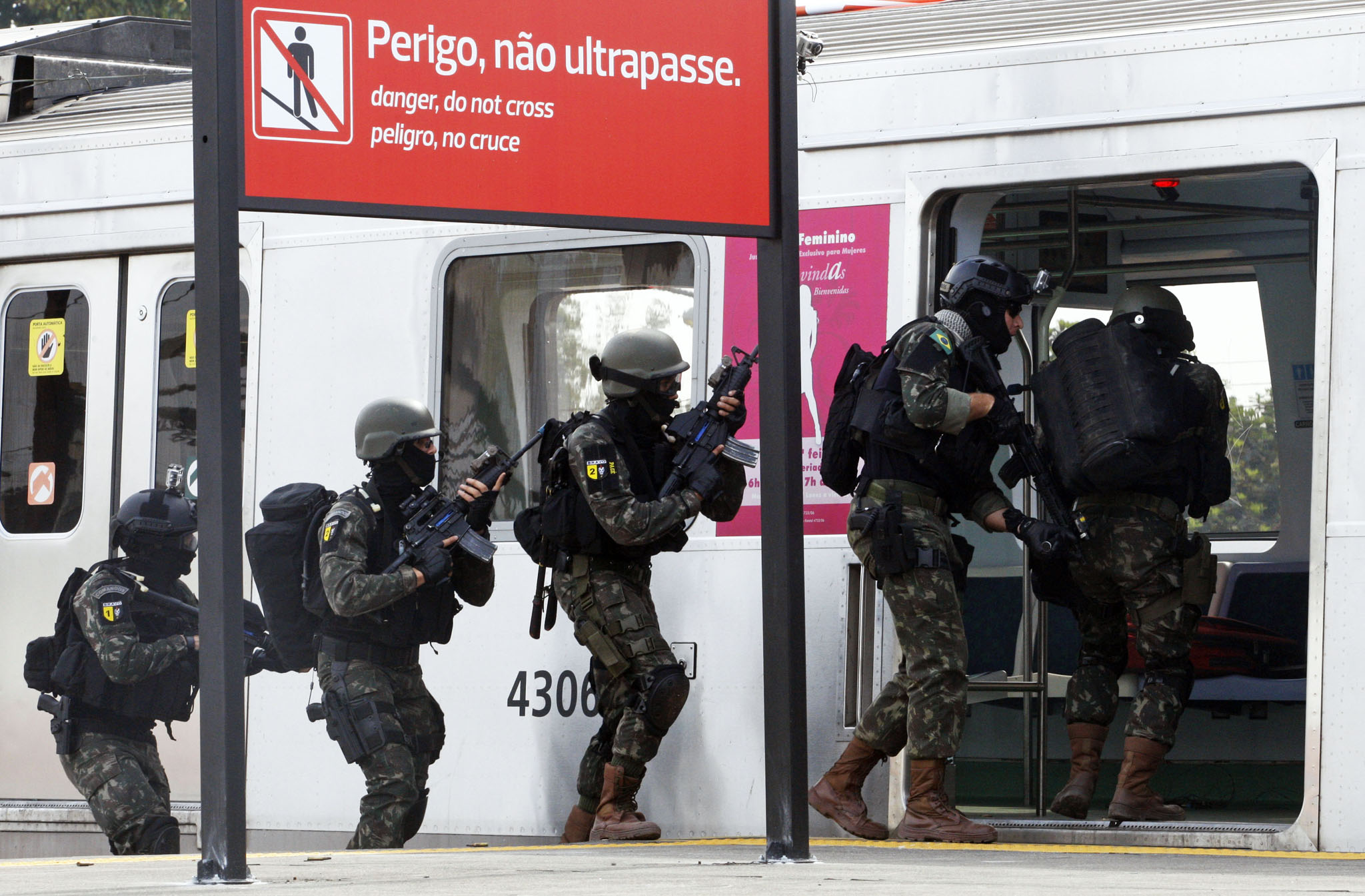
Counterterrorism training for the 2016 Olympics

Plans to expand special forces were revived after the September 11 attacks, as the context of the war on terror provided a rationale for investing in the Special Operations Brigade that could be justified to both the Brazilian public and the United States. The brigade serves as the vanguard of counterterrorism within the Brazilian Army, enabling responses to unpredictable threats and non-state adversaries. During the same period, the army also invested in capabilities for international peacekeeping operations and domestic missions, such as Law and Order Guarantee (GLO) operations. Terrorism was not the sole driver of this decision; it was also influenced by the broader "revolution in military affairs", which emphasized highly technological forces, rapid deployment capabilities, and reduced reliance on mandatory military service. The Special Operations Command is highly flexible and possesses significant destructive power. Within the army, it holds considerable prestige. (Note: "some of the most prestigious positions in the army, such as command of the Military Academy of Agulhas Negras (AMAN), the Eastern Military Command, and the Special Operations Command" (Estadão Conteúdo, 4 November 2022); "the 1st Actions and Commands Battalion, the 1st BAC, one of the units of the prestigious and feared Special Operations Command, based in Goiânia" (Metrópoles, 21 January 2023).)

=== Action ===
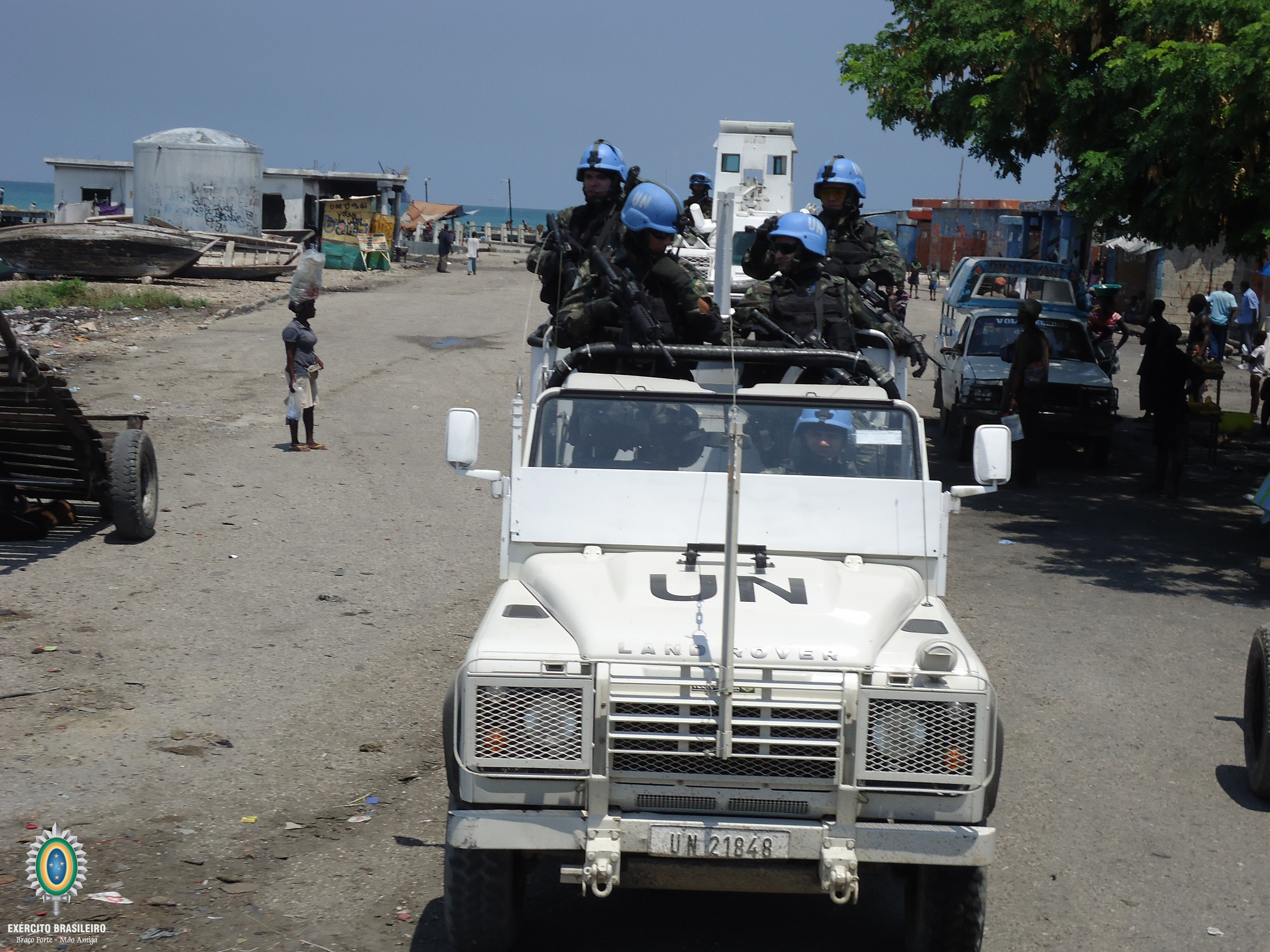
Brazilian Special Forces in Haiti

The Special Forces Detachment was a constant presence during the Araguaia Guerrilla, starting with intelligence operations. They acted as force multipliers for other units, trained local irregular forces, and conducted psychological operations. These were regular soldiers, not directly linked to political repression or the intelligence community, but they showed little inclination to take prisoners. The 1st Special Forces Battalion returned to the Amazon in 1991 for Operations Traíra and Perro Loco against the Revolutionary Armed Forces of Colombia (FARC). Among the deployed units, it played a key role due to its expertise in unconventional warfare. The battalion gathered intelligence and carried out some direct actions.

Designated by the Army General Staff as the army's counterterrorism unit in 1990, the 1st Special Forces Battalion coordinated counterterrorism security for ECO-92. In other major events, such as the 2014 FIFA World Cup and the 2016 Olympics, special forces were also prepared to provide security.

In 1993, the 1st BFEsp became involved in operations against organized crime. Under the direction of the Ministry of Justice, the battalion and the Federal Police prepared an invasion of Comando Vermelho's stronghold in the Morro do Alemão, Rio de Janeiro, similar to the operation carried out in 2010. However, the plan was canceled due to objections from governor Leonel Brizola. In the 2010s, Army Special Forces were deployed in high-risk operations against drug traffickers and militias in Rio de Janeiro. They returned to Alemão from 2010 to 2012, participated in the occupation of Complexo da Maré in 2015, and were involved in the federal intervention in Rio de Janeiro in 2018. In these contexts, they operate in environments where the police are less prepared, such as the forested areas of the hills. However, they have faced accusations of excessive violence, such as in the case of eight deaths in São Gonçalo, where the army denied that special forces were involved. In 2015, two Special Forces soldiers were wounded by traffickers during operations in Maré.

Starting in 2005, the unit contributed with the Peacekeeping Operations Detachment (DOPaz) to the United Nations Stabilization Mission in Haiti (MINUSTAH). Its 20 personnel, rotated every six months, were employed in reconnaissance and search-and-seizure operations targeting gang leaders in Haiti's slums. The detachment also played a role in developing United Nations doctrines for the use of special forces in peacekeeping operations. After Hurricane Irma struck in 2017, the detachment engaged with local leaders and conducted reconnaissance in coastal areas.

== Personnel and traditions ==
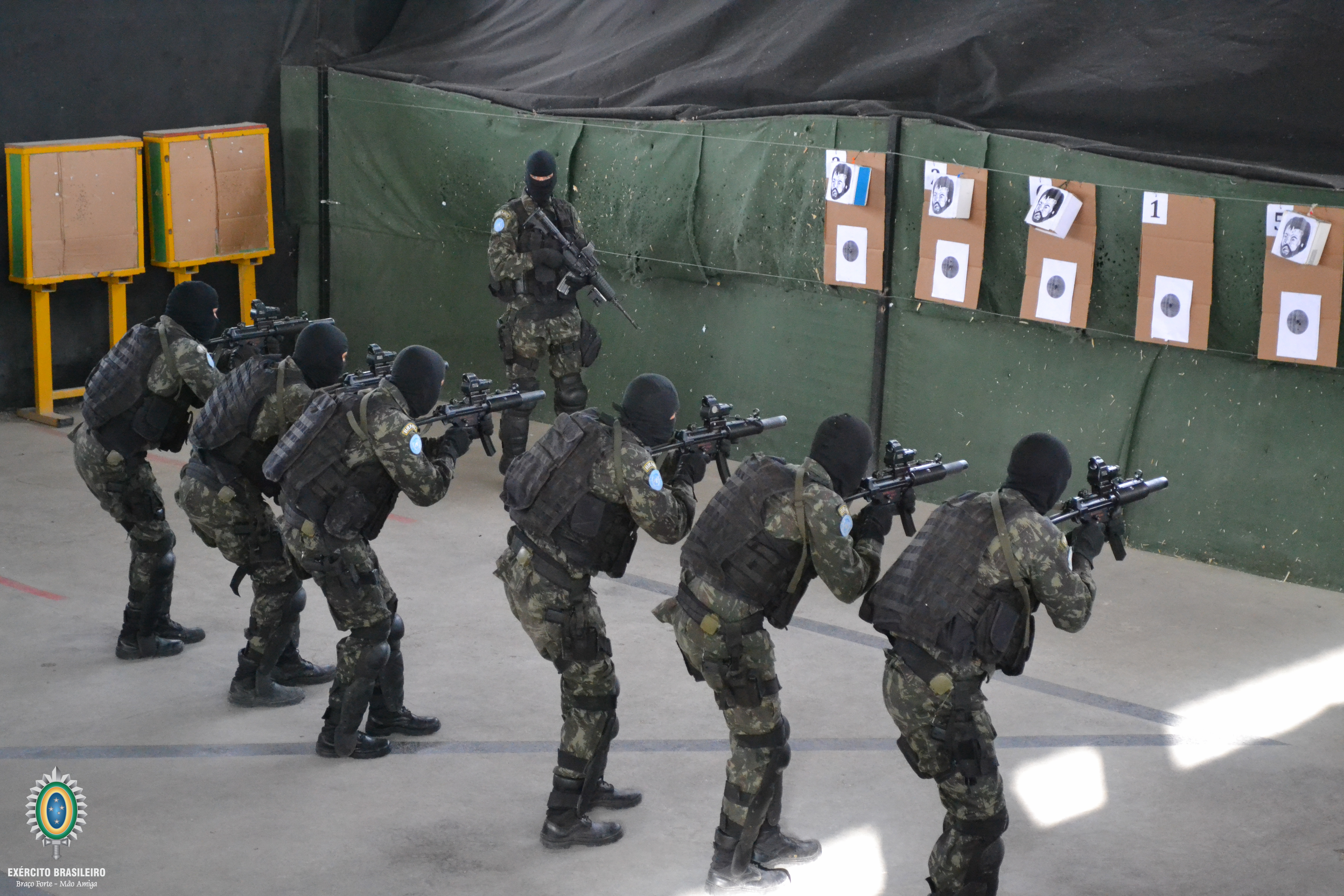
Shooting training with the MP5 submachine gun

Like other special forces, Brazilian commandos and FEs do not recruit directly from civilians; they only accept volunteers from within the military ranks. The Commando Actions Course (CAC), held at the Special Operations Instruction Center (C I Op Esp) in Niterói, is open to officers and sergeants with at least one year of service. Soldiers and corporals may volunteer for the Commando Corporal Training Course, conducted at the battalion itself. Sergeants and officers who have completed the Commando Actions and Basic Parachute courses can volunteer for the Special Forces Course, also held at the C I Op Esp. Not all personnel are parachutists, and recruitment processes differ for other units. At the Psychological Operations Battalion, personnel often have diverse experience in the Social and Human Sciences. In the Special Operations Support Battalion, their previous qualifications within the Brazilian Army are also very diverse. Both units recruit exclusively from volunteers.

The commandos and special forces receive better and more specialized training than regular soldiers. The CAC is often cited as the most feared course in the Brazilian Army. To emerge as part of the institution's elite, trainees are subjected to intense physical and psychological stress, enduring hunger, cold, pain, and other exhausting conditions. The sheer desire to wear the distinctive badge on their chest is a significant draw, but many voluntarily drop out after failing to find what they expected. For those who progress to the Special Forces Course, the selection process is even stricter: only a small minority is accepted. This course is also renowned for its extreme rigor, which some conventional military personnel even consider excessive. In 2012, the CAC included 12 weeks of training, while the Special Forces Course extended to 23 weeks. Since the 1970s, within the Paratrooper Brigade, the special forces have fostered a subculture of an elite within the elite, a status that is notoriously difficult to attain and, as such, highly valued within the institution.

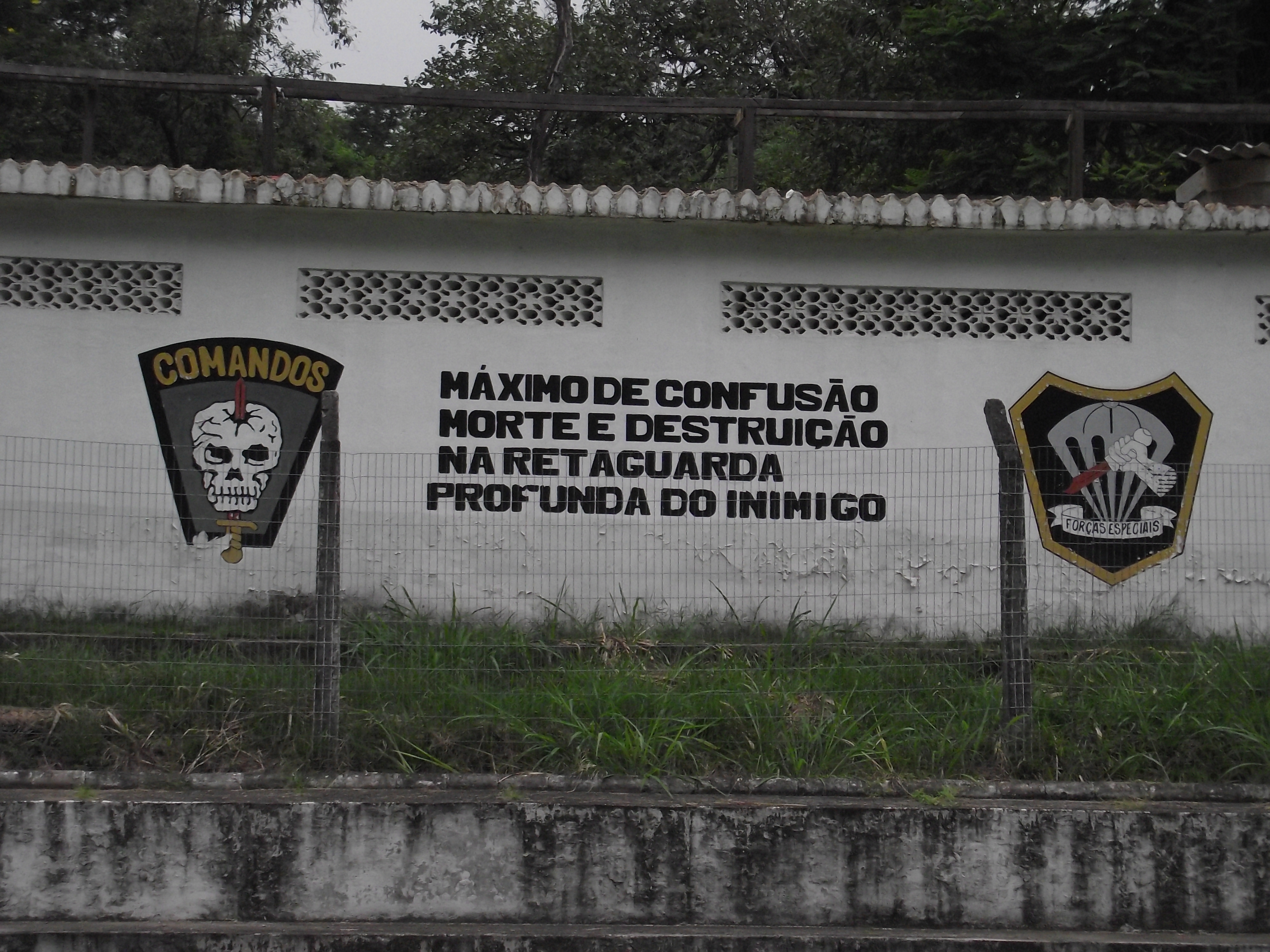
Commando (left) and Special Forces (right) badges, with the commandos' motto in the center

The special operations paratroopers inherited several symbols from the Paratrooper Infantry Brigade, such as the brown boots and the maroon beret. Between 2003 and 2015, there was an attempt to establish a new tradition, introducing dark brown boots and a darker beret. Another distinctive piece of their uniform is the black cap, which gave rise to their informal nickname, "kids pretos".

They have also incorporated the skull and dagger into their symbolism, elements used by special forces worldwide. The skull alone has an even longer tradition in military heraldry. The Commando Actions Battalion uses an insignia featuring a skull pierced by a red dagger, symbolizing the enemy's blood, with a green background representing the jungle and black for nighttime operations. The dagger-in-skull symbol, also adopted by police special forces, is the most controversial. Military personnel describe it as a symbol of overcoming death. The Special Forces Battalion uses an insignia featuring a gloved hand, representing discreet actions, holding a red dagger, once again with a black background, along with a parachute. This symbol is intended to portray the Special Forces as the most feared unit in the army. The command itself combines the symbols of the two battalions, adding a parachute jump over the map of Brazil.

== Structure ==
The COpEsp is subordinated to the Planalto Military Command but is linked to the Land Operations Command (COTER) for training and deployment purposes. Its location in Goiânia is geographically central in Brazil, allowing for faster response times to any region in the country. The decision to relocate it from Rio de Janeiro in 2003 was also aimed at distancing military personnel and former members from potential recruitment by Rio's drug traffickers. The original plans included a Commando Battalion and a Special Forces Battalion in the Central Nucleus (comprising the Military Commands of the Southeast, East, and Planalto), as well as a Chemical Warfare Battalion under the Southern Military Command. At some point, the concept of a central command emerged. At its foundation, it was the only major unit of its kind in Latin America. (Note: Similar commands currently exist in other armies, such as Chile's and Venezuela's.) Although created as a brigade, its organization differs from that of a conventional brigade. All components, except for the Special Operations Instruction Center (C I Op Esp) in Niterói, are based in Goiânia. Additionally, the command maintains technical ties to the 3rd Special Forces Company, under the Amazon Military Command. The "spearhead" of the COpEsp consists of its two operational battalions: the 1st Commando Actions Battalion (1st BAC) and the 1st Special Forces Battalion (1st BFEsp). Its smallest operational unit is known as a detachment.

COpEsp's military organizations (2019)
- Administrative Base
- 1st Special Forces Battalion
- 1st Commando Actions Battalion
- 1st Psychological Operations Battalions
- Special Operations Support Battalion
- Chemical, Biological, Radiological, and Nuclear Defense Company
- 6th Army Police Platoon
- Special Operations Instruction Center

=== Commandos ===
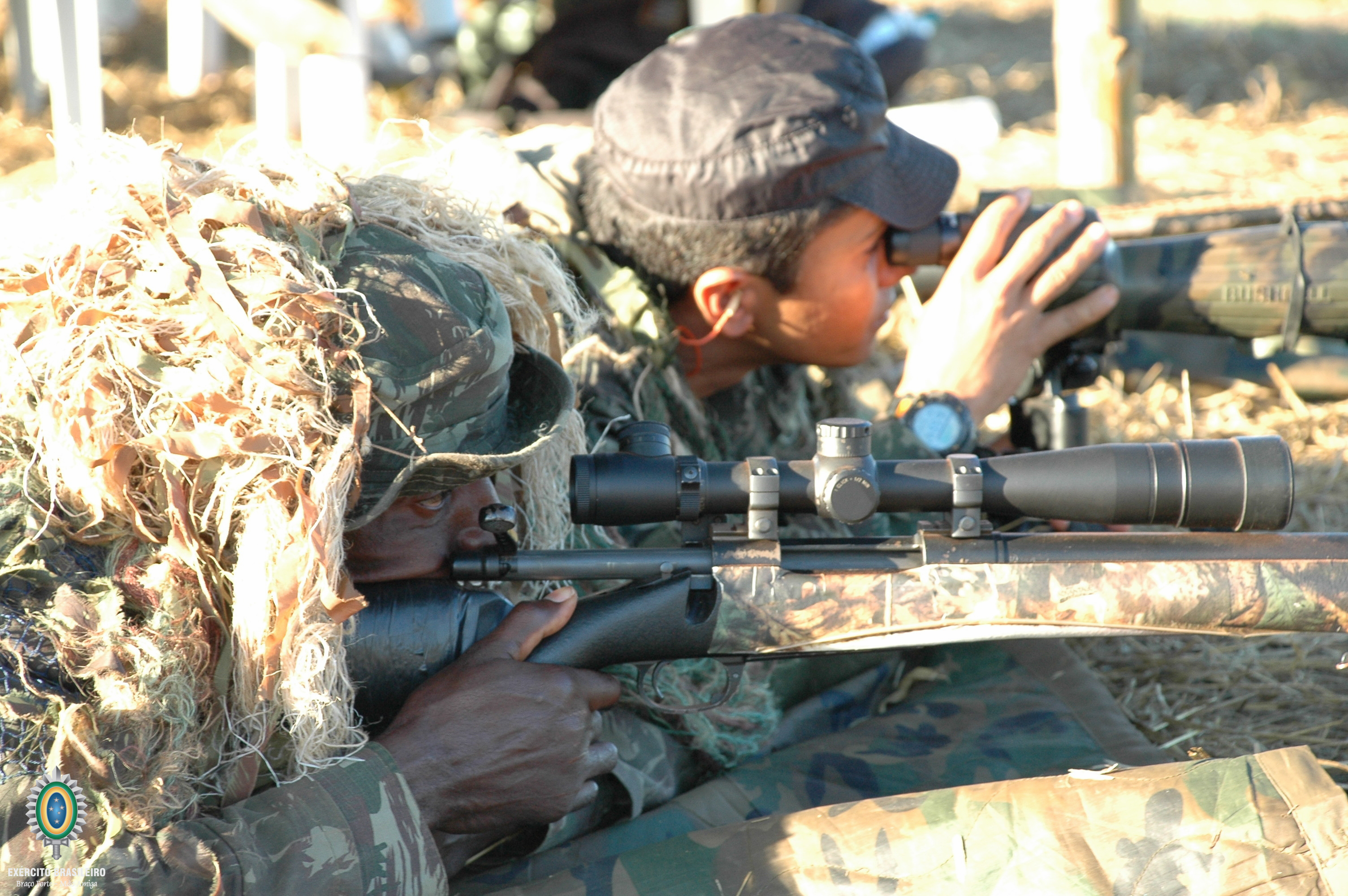
Caçadores (hunters) team

The 1st Commando Actions Battalion (1st BAC) is an elite light infantry force organized into a command and support company, three commando actions companies, and a Reconnaissance and Hunters Detachment (DRC). The commando companies each consist of three Commando Actions Detachments, with 42 operatives each, reinforced by personnel from the DRC. Commando actions are high-risk operations targeting strategic objectives in hostile territory. The battalion is specialized in direct action missions. The training, marked by realism, prepares operatives for infiltration and operations in any type of terrain, including mountains, the Caatinga, the Pantanal, and jungle. Commandos can work on reconnaissance and intelligence, combat against irregular forces (including counterterrorism), fire support observation, among other activities. Graduates of the course are trained for both the planning and execution of these military actions.

=== Special Forces ===
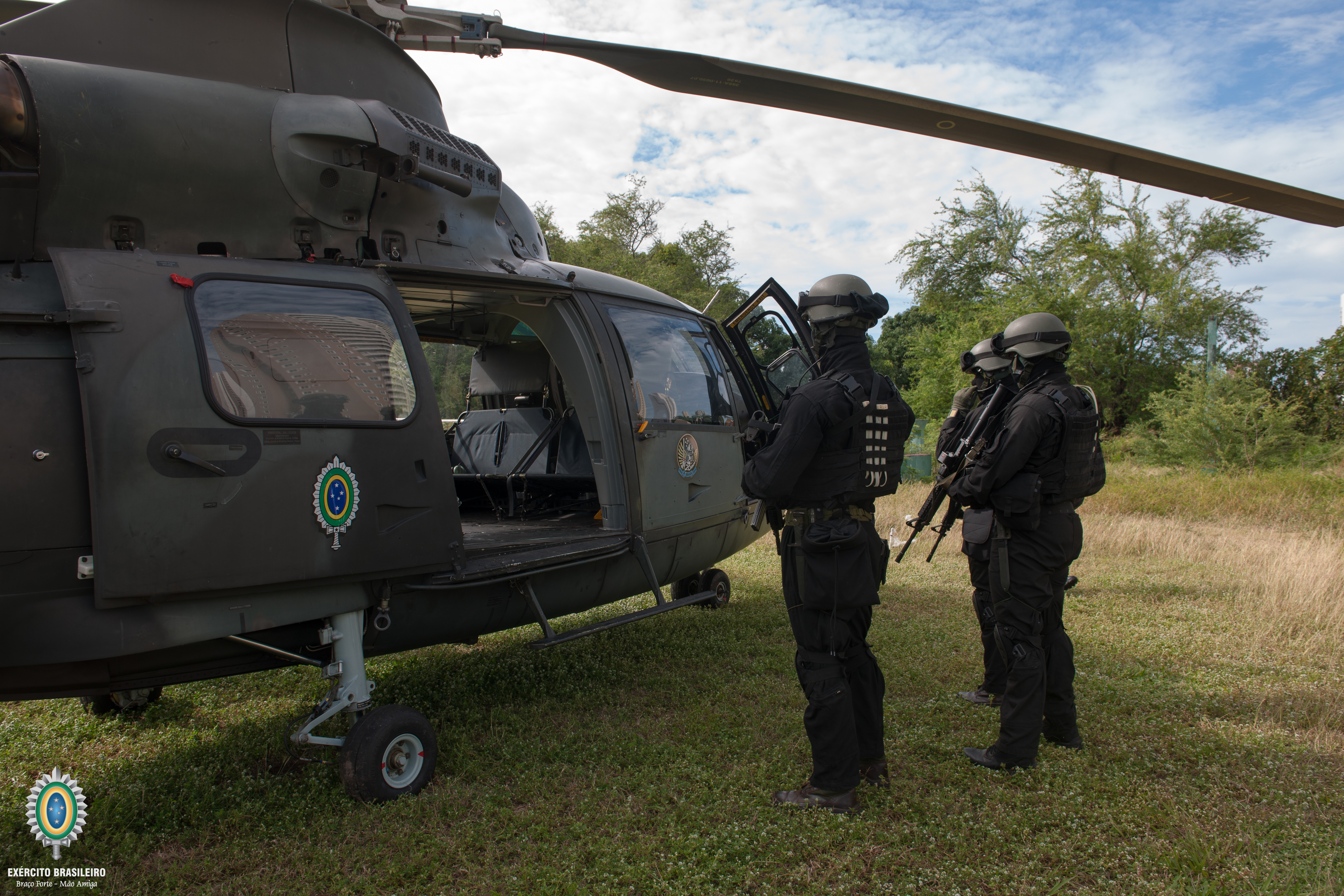
Special forces with an Army Aviation Panther helicopter

The main component of the COpEsp is the 1st Special Forces Battalion, organized into a command and support company, two special forces companies, known as Force 1 and Force 2, and a Counterterrorism Detachment. The special forces company consists of four Special Forces Operational Detachments; when reinforced by commandos, they are referred to as Immediate Action Detachments. In 2001, the battalion had approximately 500 personnel, but like other countries, Brazil discloses little information about its special forces. Its training is often compared to that of the United States Navy SEALs or Delta Force.

The Special Forces (FEs) have duties similar to those of commandos and also operate in hostile territory, where they must survive for long periods. However, they have additional, more complex responsibilities, such as psychological operations. They learn guerrilla tactics and urban operations, including combating criminal activities. They can be clandestinely infiltrated up to a year before an attack, possibly in civilian clothing, to identify opponents and allies. They are trained in sabotage, psychological interrogation, and even diplomacy. Some are not only paratroopers but also divers. Their survival skills are considerable. Long-distance reconnaissance patrols in the jungle are large by special forces standards, with up to 24 men. Similar to American special forces, Brazilian forces aim to create zones of unconventional warfare. Brazilian special forces would work through indirect action among the local population, building a resistance movement against a foreign invasion as part of an attritional war, especially in the Amazon. Due to their secretive operations, the FEs are nicknamed "ghosts". They are not as well known to the public as police special forces.

The 3rd Special Forces Company, known as Force 3, is linked to the COpEsp for preparation and training but is subordinated to the Amazon Military Command. Although it can operate independently, its primary role is as a force multiplier for other formations.

=== Other components ===
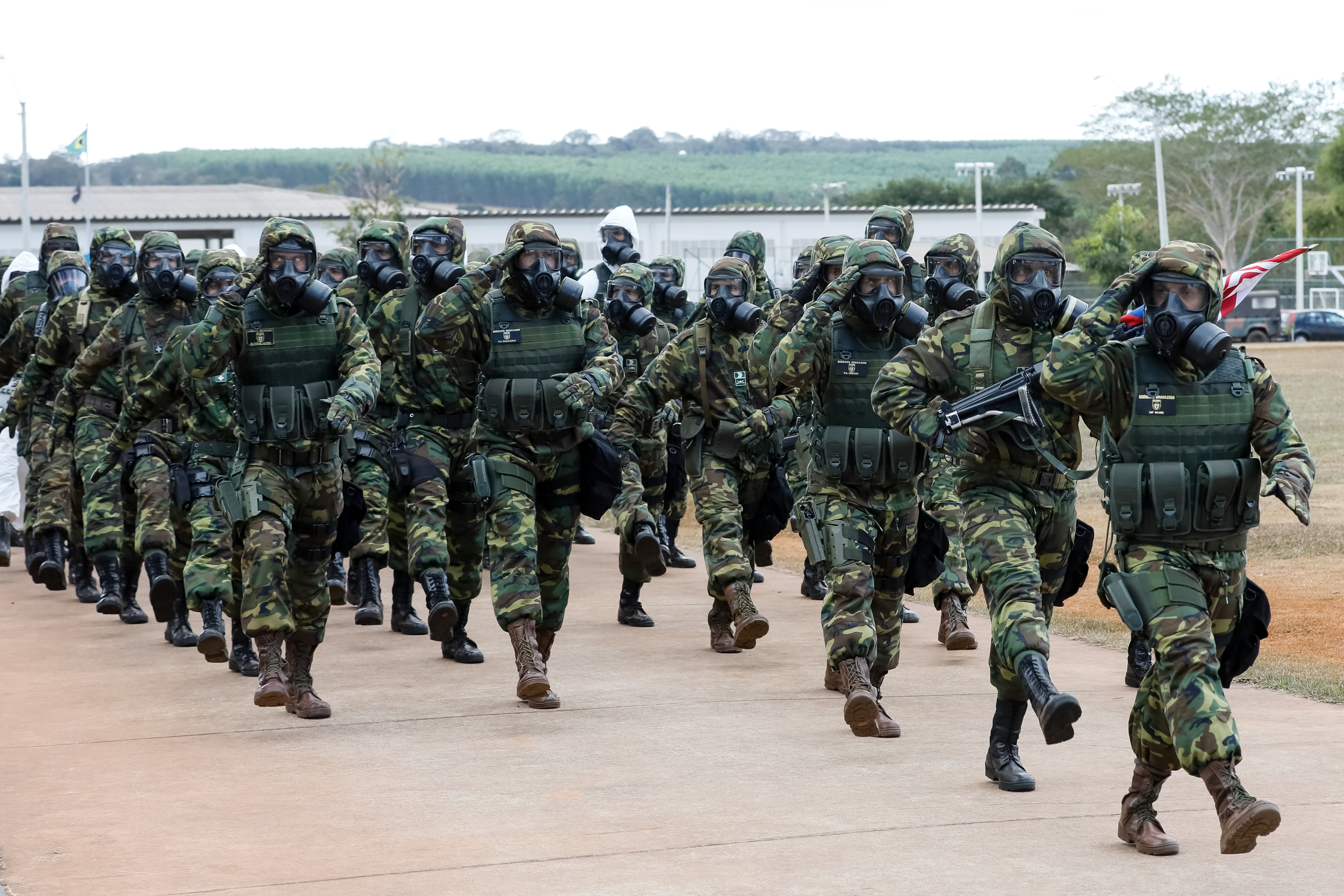
DBQRN company

The 1st Psychological Operations Battalion operates in support of the COpEsp and the Area Military Commands, developing Brazilian military doctrine in its field and creating and disseminating psychological operations materials for friendly forces, enemy forces, and civilians. The Brazilian Army was the first branch of the country's Armed Forces to implement psychological operations training. However, the COpEsp does not have a unit specifically dedicated to Civil Affairs.

The Chemical, Biological, Radiological, and Nuclear Defense Company (DQBRN) supports other units by monitoring vulnerabilities to weapons of mass destruction, providing safety equipment, and carrying out decontamination. The Special Operations Support Battalion installs communication systems, offers limited transportation capabilities, supports air and water infiltration and exfiltration, prepares parachutes and aerial supplies, and provides medical care, among other combat and logistical support functions. The 6th Army Police Platoon (PE) provides typical military police support. The Administrative Base manages finances, facilities, and personnel.

== Equipment ==
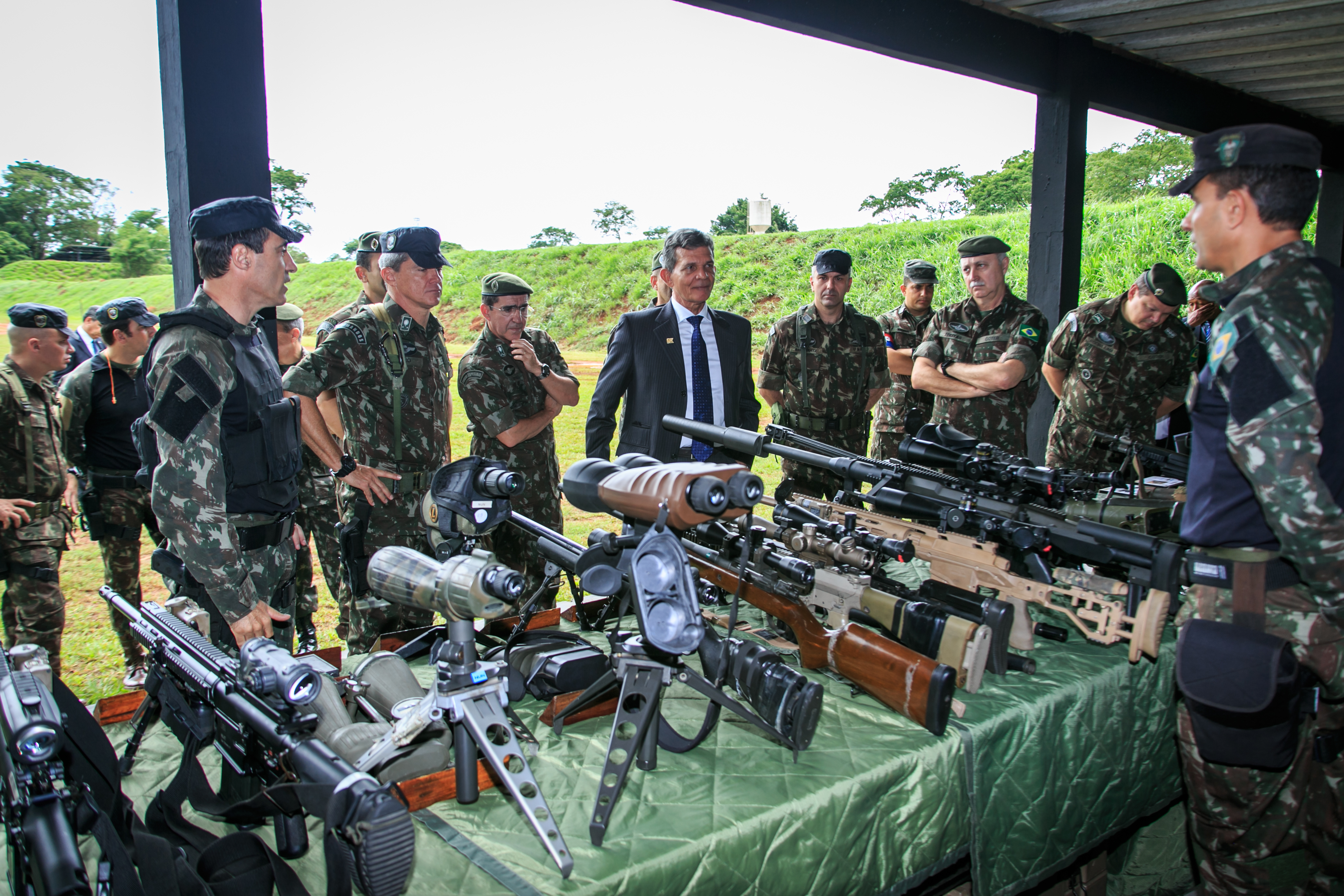
Equipment display

Commandos and special forces are equipped with advanced gear and weaponry. A special forces operative may carry a radio, explosives, night vision, thermal or low-light goggles, first aid supplies, and up to 35 kilograms in their backpack. Standard "woodland" camouflage and the Shemagh scarf are commonly used. Their weapons include both Brazilian and foreign models, such as Beretta, Colt .45, and IMBEL M-976 pistols; the MP5 submachine gun; rifles and carbines like the H&K G53, M4, IMBEL IA2, ParaFAL and M16A2, light machine guns like the FN Minimi, shotguns from Franchi, Remington, Mossberg, and ENARM, and even flamethrowers. The EOTech holographic sight is the most widely used. Snipers employ the Remington M-24, Heckler & Koch PSG1, and Barrett M82 rifles. The Counterterrorism Detachment is trained in hand-to-hand combat using daggers.

Detachments can infiltrate via air, water, or land, using specialized vehicles or fixed- or rotary-wing aircraft. Helicopters from the Army Aviation frequently support the command, but no component is specifically assigned to special operations support. Similarly, the Brazilian Air Force does not have squadrons dedicated exclusively to supporting special forces but trains for this purpose. In 2012, common aircraft used for special forces support included C-130 and CASA C-295 transports, F-5E fighters, AMX A-1 and A-29 Super Tucano attack aircraft, R-99A and R-99B aerial surveillance planes, and helicopters like the UH-60 Black Hawk, and CH-34 Super Puma.

== See also ==
- List of military special forces units
- Asymmetric warfare
- Hybrid warfare
