= SOCOM (disambiguation) =

SOCOM is an abbreviation which refers to United States Special Operations Command.

SOCOM may also refer to:

== Weapons ==
- .458 SOCOM, a moderately large round designed for a specialized upper receiver that can be mounted on any AR-15 lower receiver
- Firearms for USSOCOM's Offensive Sidearm Weapon System (OSWS) trials:
  - Colt OHWS
  - Heckler & Koch Mark 23 Mod 0
- SOCOM 16 and SOCOM II, variants of the Springfield Armory M1A rifle

== Video games ==
- SOCOM U.S. Navy SEALs, a series of third-person shooter video games

== See also ==
- SOC (disambiguation)
