= Symposium on Combinatorial Search =

The Symposium on Combinatorial Search (SoCS) in an international conference aimed at bringing together researchers and all others interested in all fields that use combinatorial search, including artificial intelligence, planning, robotics, constraint programming, meta-reasoning, operations research, navigation, and bioinformatics.

In addition, the conference tries to strengthen the relation with other important areas of artificial intelligence. In recent years, there has been an emphasis on robotics, automated planning, big data, and meta-reasoning.

SoCS is also an unincorporated non-profit volunteer association organized in New Hampshire (USA), with the purpose of promoting the study and understanding of combinatorial search and heuristic search algorithms among the public through the organization of scientific meetings, publications, tutorials, and other public scientific and educational activities.

== History ==
The First Symposium on Combinatorial Search was held in Chicago (Illinois, USA) in 2008 as a result of various workshops that were held in previous conferences, mainly IJCAI, AAAI and ICAPS. Since then, it has been held every year, always in association with a larger event.

Although the first three symposia were held in the United States, SoCS rotates around the world, being co-located near whichever major conference the organizers target. Papers from the first two symposia (2008 and 2009) are available on the web. Since SoCS 2010, the symposium has published with AAAI Press and all accepted papers can be found in the AAAI Digital Library.

== List of past conferences ==
Conference	Year	City	Country	Date
SoCS 2019	2019	Napa	USA	July 16–17
SoCS 2018	2018	Stockholm	Sweden	July 14–15
SoCS 2017	2017	Pittsburgh	USA	June 16–17
SoCS 2016	2016	Tarrytown, New York	USA	July 6 to 8
SoCS 2015	2015	Ein Gedi	Israel	June 11–13
SoCS 2014	2014	Prague	Czech Republic	August 15–17
SoCS 2013	2013	Leavenworth (Washington)	USA	July 11–13
SoCS 2012	2012	Niagara Falls	Canada	July 19–21
SoCS 2011	2011	Barcelona	Spain	July 15–16
SoCS 2010	2010	Atlanta (Georgia)	USA	July 8–10
SoCS 2009	2009	Lake Arrowhead (California)	USA	July 8–10
SoCS 2008	2008	Chicago (Illinois)	USA	July 13–14
