= Consciousness (disambiguation) =

Consciousness is the state or quality of awareness.

Consciousness may also refer to:

- Consciousness (Hill book), 2009 book by Christopher S. Hill
- Consciousness: How Matter Becomes Imagination, a 2000 book by biologists Gerald Maurice Edelman and Giulio Tononi
- Consciousness! (Eric Kloss album), 1970
- Consciousness (Pat Martino album), 1974
- Consciousness (Smile Empty Soul album), 2009

== See also ==
- Conscious (disambiguation)
- Unconsciousness
