= IMBEL MD97 =

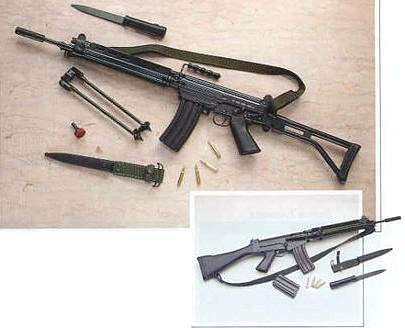
- Type: Assault rifle
- Place of origin: Brazil

Service history
- In service: 1997-present
- Used by: See Users

Production history
- Manufacturer: IMBEL
- Variants: See Variants

Specifications
- Mass: 3.7 kg (8.2 lb) (MD97L), 3.3 kg (7.3 lb) (MD97LC)
- Length: 1,010 mm (40 in) (MD97L), 850 mm (33 in) (MD97LC)
- Barrel length: 437 mm (17.2 in) (MD97L), 330 mm (13 in)
- Cartridge: 5.56×45mm NATO
- Rate of fire: 950 rounds per minute
- Muzzle velocity: 920 m/s (3,000 ft/s)
- Effective firing range: 600 m (660 yd)
- Maximum firing range: 3,800 m (4,200 yd)
- Feed system: 30-round STANAG magazines

The IMBEL MD97 is a Brazilian assault rifle used by the Brazilian Army, Special Forces, and police forces.

== History ==
The MD97 is a selective-fire or semi-automatic assault rifle that has been produced by IMBEL in Brazil since 1997. It is based upon the IMBEL MD2, which is itself based upon the FN FAL.

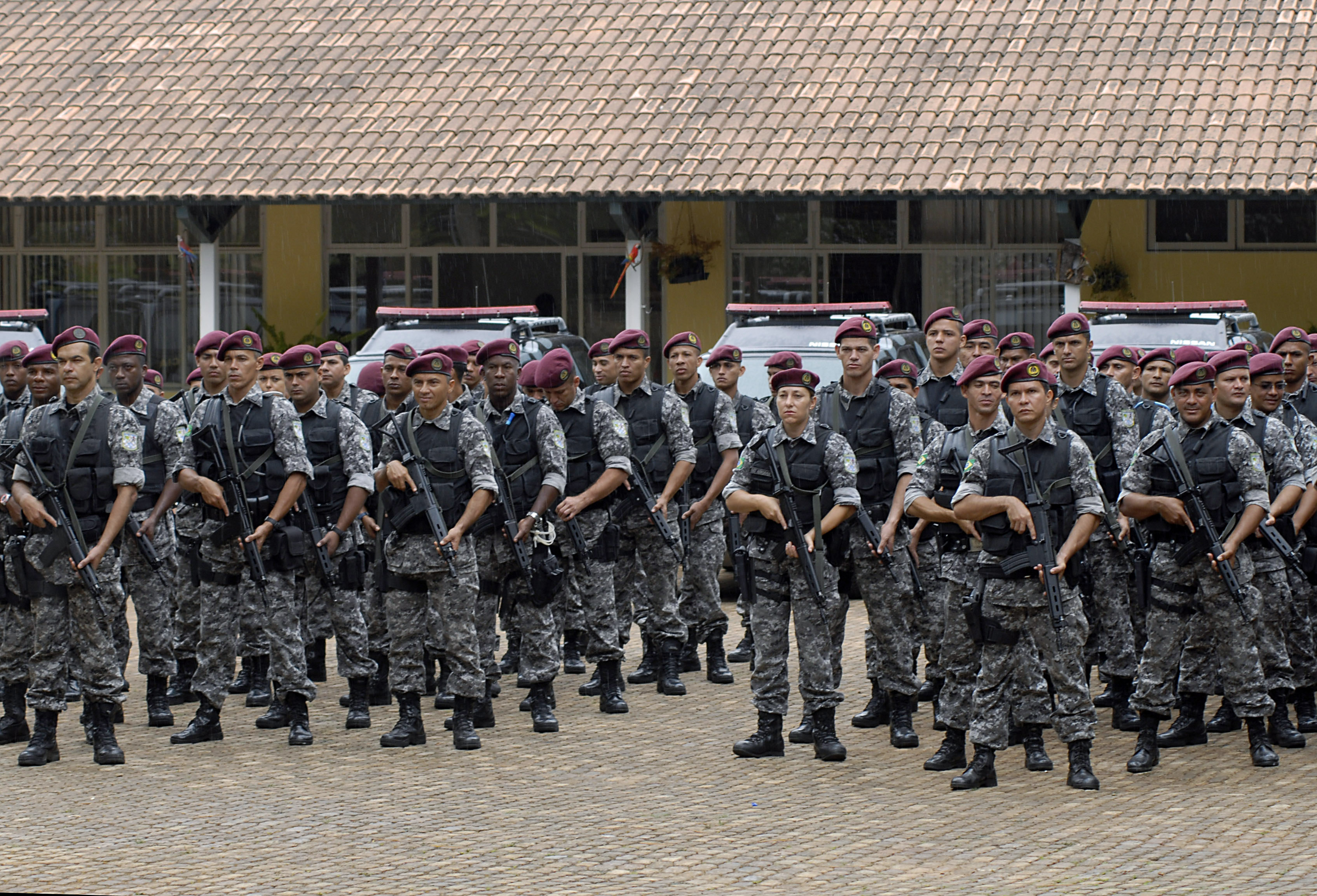
A large group of National Public Security Force soldiers armed with MD97s

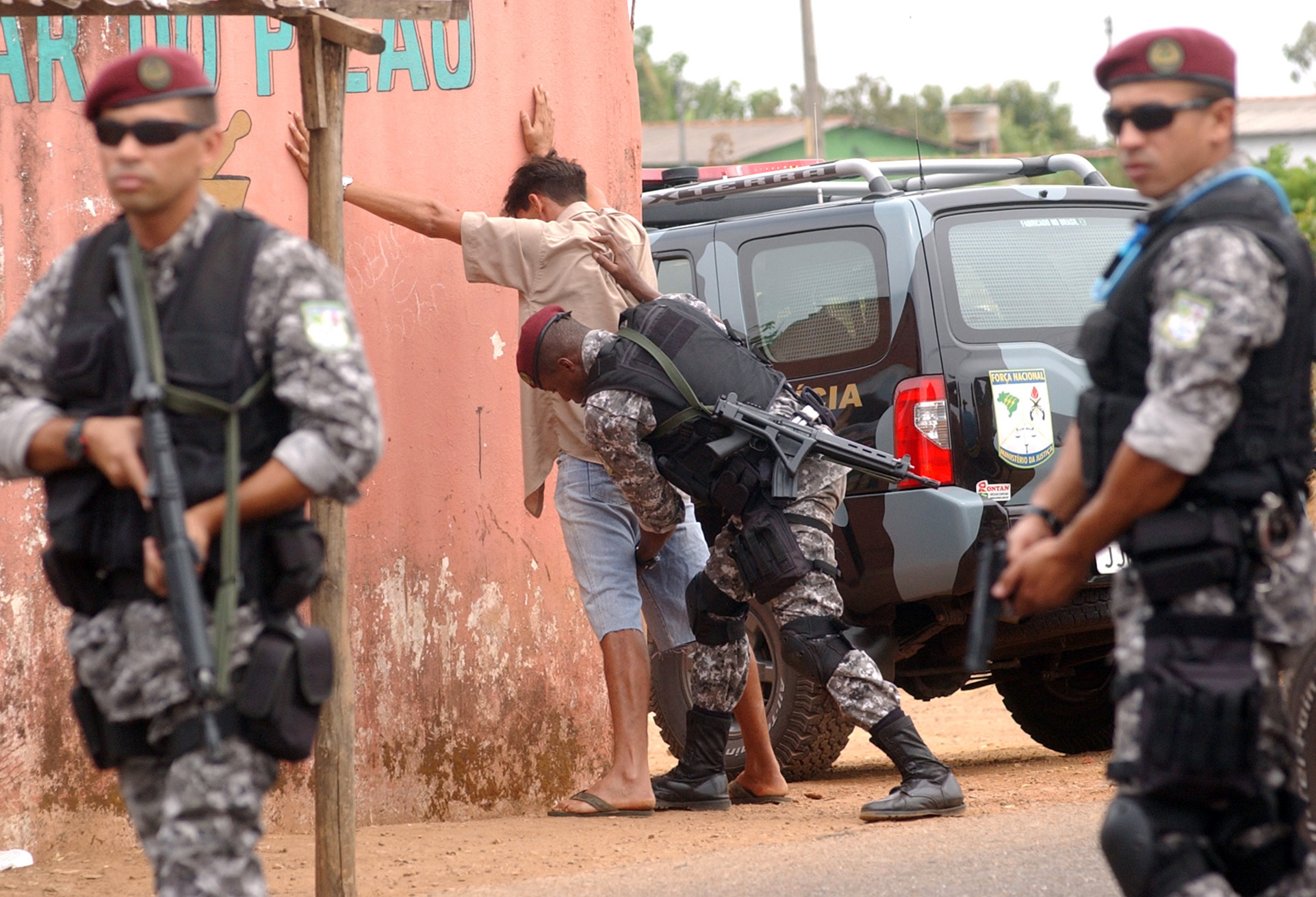
Two National Public Security Force soldiers armed with MD97s

== Variants ==
- MD97L- standard full-size, selective-fire version for use with Brazilian Army.
- MD97LM- MD97L with the addition of MIL-STD-1913 rails for mounting scopes and tactical attachments intended for use by Brazilian Special forces.
- MD97LC- compact, semi-automatic only version for use with domestic police forces.

== Users ==
- Brazil
  - Brazilian Army
  - Military Police of Rio de Janeiro State
  - Military Police of São Paulo State
  - Military Police of Espírito Santo State
  - Military Brigade of Rio Grande do Sul
  - Military Police of Paraná State
  - National Public Security Force
