= IMBEL IA2 =

Brazilian assault rifle

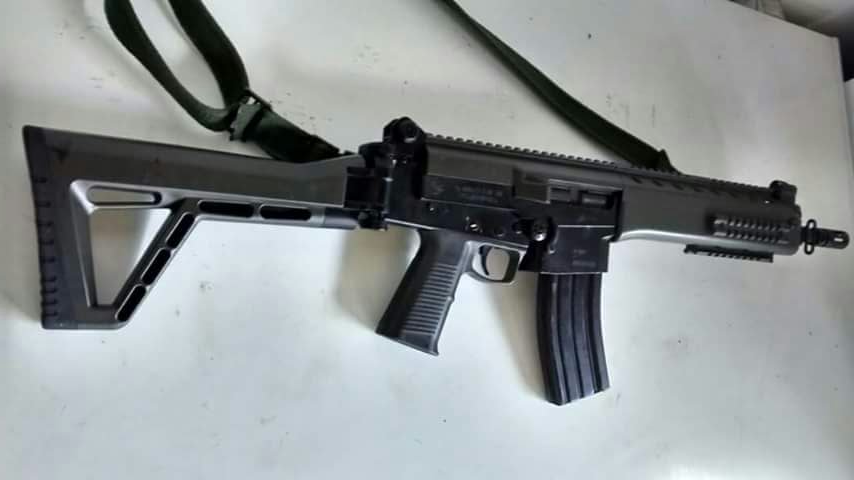
- IMBEL IA2 5.56 assault rifle
- Type: Assault rifle Carbine
- Place of origin: Brazil

Service history
- In service: 2012–present
- Used by: Brazil

Production history
- Designed: 2010–2012
- Manufacturer: IMBEL
- Produced: 2012–present
- No. built: 200,000+
- Variants: See Variants

Specifications
- Mass: IA2 5.56: 3.38 kg (7.5 lb); IA2 7.62: 3.76–4.03 kg (8.3–8.9 lb) empty
- Length: IA2 5.56: 850 mm (33 in) (Stock Extended); 600 mm (24 in) (Stock Folded); IA2 7.62: 800–920 mm (31–36 in) (Stock Extended); 550–670 mm (22–26 in) (Stock Folded)
- Barrel length: IA2 5.56: 330 mm (13.0 in); IA2 7.62: 265–390 mm (10.4–15.4 in)
- Cartridge: 5.56×45mm NATO; 7.62×51mm NATO
- Action: Gas-operated, rotating bolt
- Rate of fire: 730–890 rounds/min (IA2 5.56); 700 rounds/min (IA2 7.62)
- Muzzle velocity: IA2 5.56: 780 m/s (2,600 ft/s); IA2 7.62: 655 to 685 m/s (2,150 to 2,250 ft/s)
- Effective firing range: 300 to 600 m (330 to 660 yd)
- Maximum firing range: 3,600 m (3,937 yd)
- Feed system: STANAG magazines (IA2 5.56 mm); 20-round FN FAL-pattern magazines (IA2 7.62 mm)
- Sights: Rear sight with side adjustment with 2 positions (150 and 300 meters), and various optical sights

The IMBEL IA2 is developed in two different models: IA2 5.56 in 5.56×45mm NATO and IA2 7.62 in 7.62×51mm NATO; both are designed and manufactured in Brazil by IMBEL. It is designed to replace the FN FAL, M16A2 and HK33 currently in service with the Brazilian Armed Forces.

== History ==
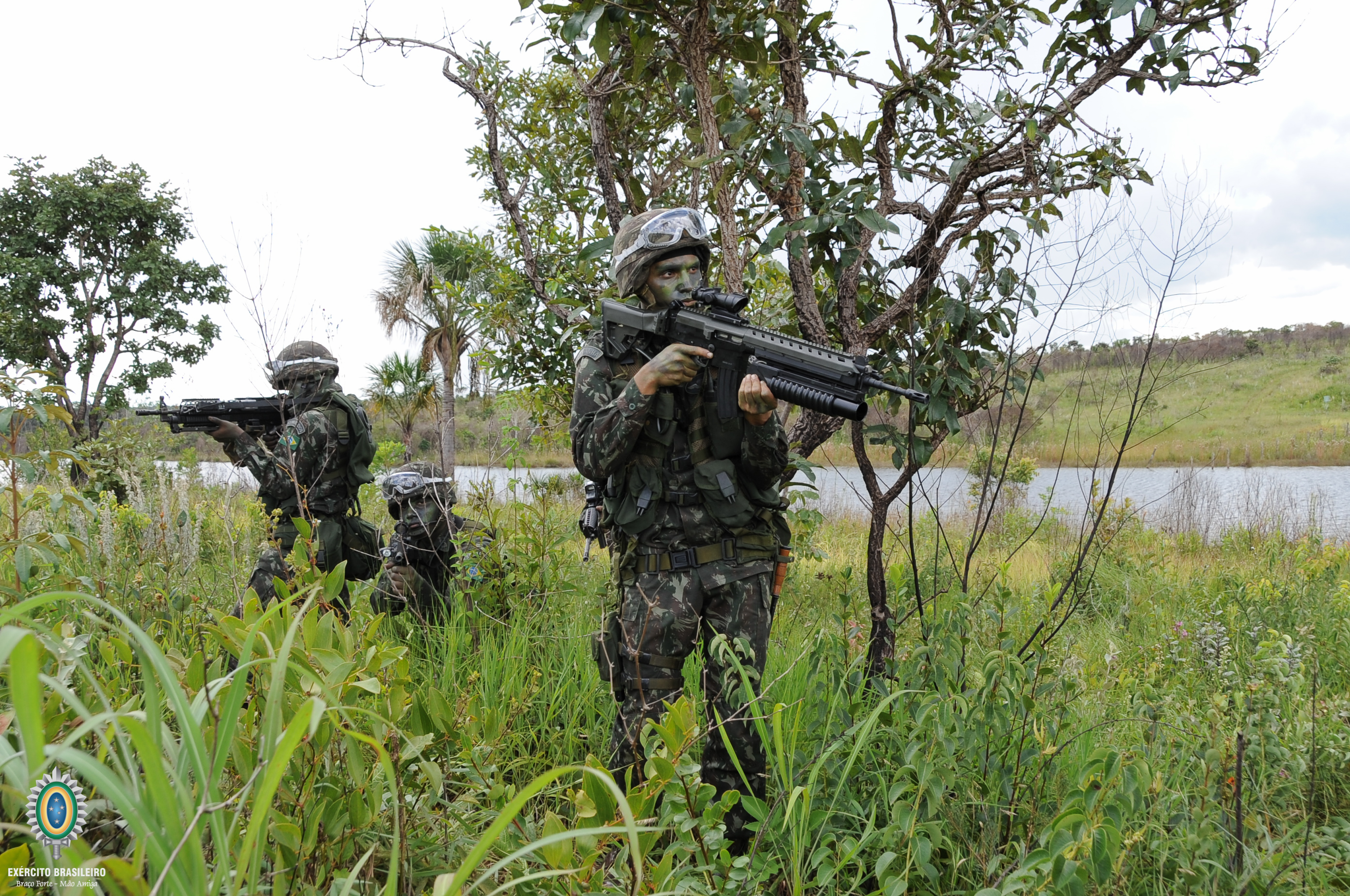
Brazilian special forces with the IA2 5.56

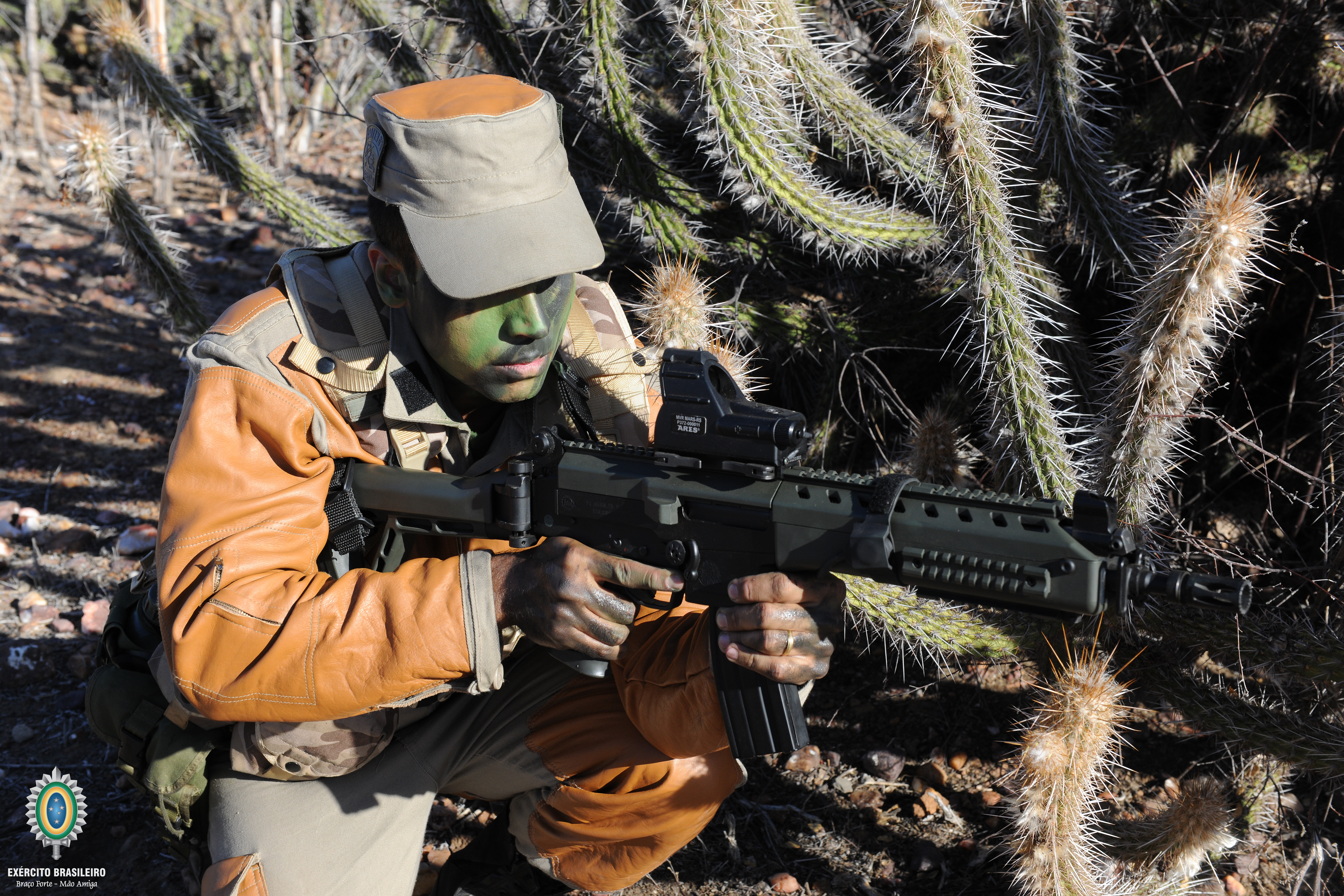
Caatinga soldier with the IA2 5.56

The IMBEL IA2 was created by Lieutenant Colonel Paulo Augusto Capetti Rodrigues Porto of the Brazilian Armaments Industry (IMBEL), to replace FN FAL and its variants in the ranks of the Brazilian Army. After the Army realized that IMBEL MD-97 could not meet the basic requirements to replace the FAL, IMBEL began to modernize the MD-97 project, but the simple modernization of the project, which used many FAL parts, was not enough to meet the needs of the Army.

With this, the project of a totally new rifle began in 2012, initially named as MD-97 Mk.II, not just a modernization of the MD-97, but a totally new rifle. It was unveiled in 2010, when it began to be tested in the Center of Evaluations of Army (CAEx), in the test field of Marambaia, Rio de Janeiro. In 2012, the Army commissioned the initial order of 1,500 IA2 5.56, in the 5.56×45mm NATO and 7.62×51mm NATO model, to be distributed for testing between Various units of the Army, such as the Special Operations Brigade, the Parachute Infantry Brigade and the Jungle Infantry Brigades.

The final product fired over 70 thousand rounds, and was subjected to endurance tests, sand, dust, high and low temperatures as well as immersion in water, followed by firing. The performance in tests in the jungle environment proved its reliability, as well as its run time of 15 seconds after submersion. Its performance was also tested in parachuting, caatinga and special operations.

In 2012, tests were carried out for the operational evaluation of 20 rifles at the Brazilian Marine Corps through COMANF, the Battalion Riverine Operations and 3rd Infantry Battalion of Marines, under the coordination of Board of Navy Weapon Systems (DSAM) and Equipment Command of the Marines (CMatFN). The performance of the rifle was evaluated under operational conditions, where was verified, for example, its compatibility with the individual equipment of the military and its resistance to impacts and contact with sand, water or mud.

In December 2013 the Brazilian Army placed an order for 20,000 rifles in 5.56. In 2016, it was announced that CAEx would be testing five prototypes of the Fz 7.62 variant.

In 2021, the Brazilian Army selected the AEL Guará red dot sight, from AEL Sistemas, to equip their IA2s.

=== Operational feedback ===
The IMBEL IA2 has been heavily criticized by experts and users alike. Many of such criticisms relate to the design limitations inherited from the FAL, which was used as a base for the IA2's design to retain training familiarity and parts commonality.

Among the criticisms are the fact that its charging handle is not directly attached to the bolt carrier, while also not possessing forward assist, forcing the soldier to disassemble the rifle in the middle of combat should the bolt fail to close fully due to mechanical failure or obstructions in the chamber, such as dirt and mud. The charging handle is a knob on the left side of the rifle, identical to that of the FAL, but due to it not being like that of the paratrooper FAL, which folds forwards when not in use, it often snags on soldiers' gear. The charging handle is non-ambidextrous, as is the fire mode selector and safety switch, which is positioned on the left side of the trigger assembly. All this makes it difficult for left-handed shooters to operate. The fire selector switch is the same as the MD97, and adopts a 180º angle when switching between firing modes. Meanwhile, modern rifles, aiming at better ergonomics, adopt a 90º angle. This would prevent the operator from having to take his hand off the grip to use the switch and also from uncomfortably stretching his finger too much. The designers of the rifle say they omitted considerations for left handed shooters, as they make up only 10% of the troops; it was decided it was not worth the cost and time to accommodate to them.

Some commentators say the magazine release button is stiff and difficult to actuate.

The railed dust cover has been reported by users to not be properly fixed to the handguard, which makes the use of sights and precision optical equipment ineffective as the zero of sights and lasers is not maintained consistently while firing. This greatly limits the rifle's utility as a precision rifle.

The IA2 did not modify the pivoting axis for disassembling the rifle, which is located between the magazine well and the trigger guard,.

Despite the polymer stock, the IA2 uses the same folding and locking mechanism as the MD97, which has been described as suboptimal by users, as the stock is seen to wobble while firing. Also criticized is the abandonment of the retractable stock, which provides better ergonomics for use by people of different body structures and facilitates the handling of the rifle from unusual firing positions in urban combat.

== Design details ==
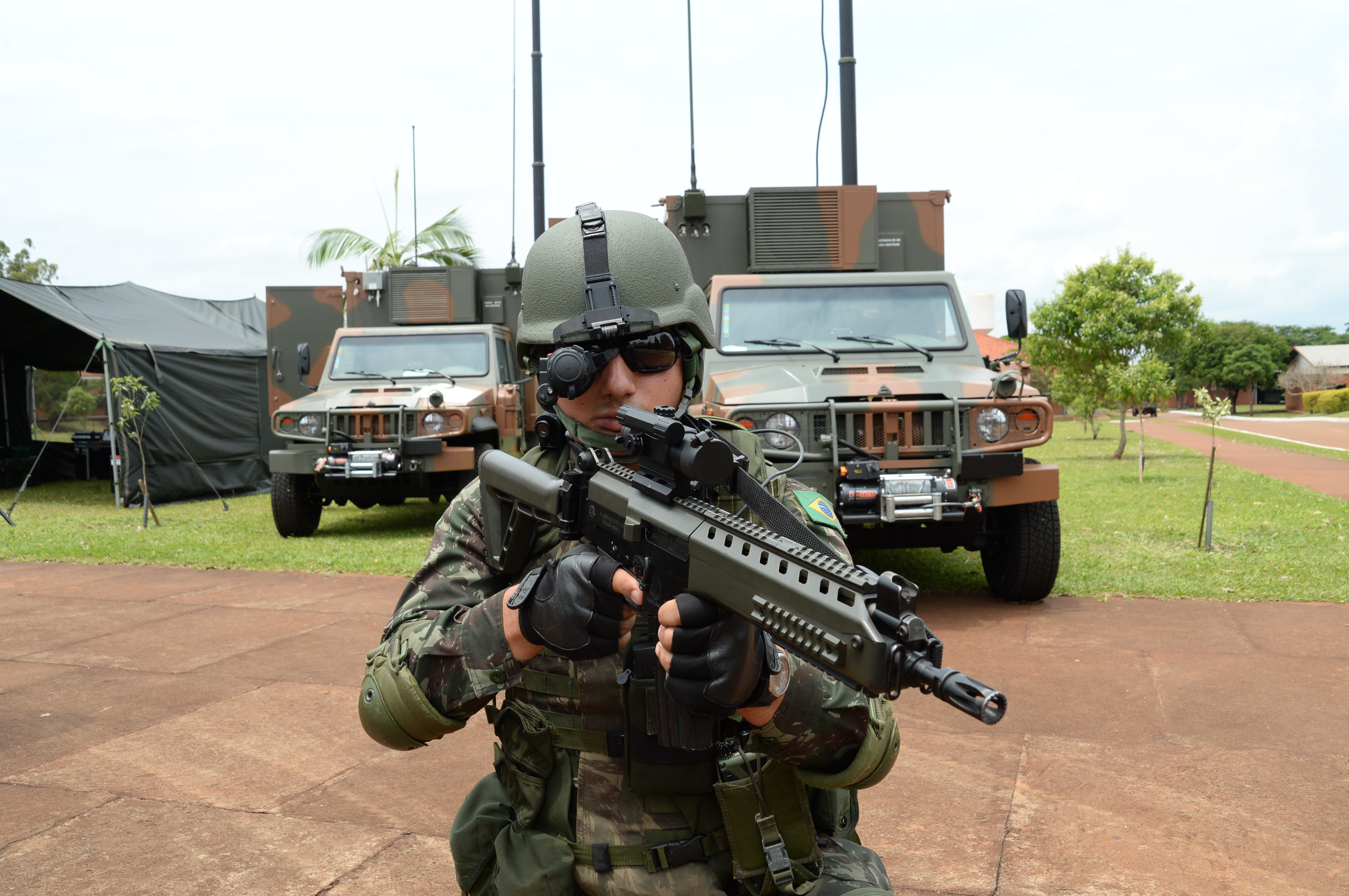
Border Brigade soldier with the IA2 5.56

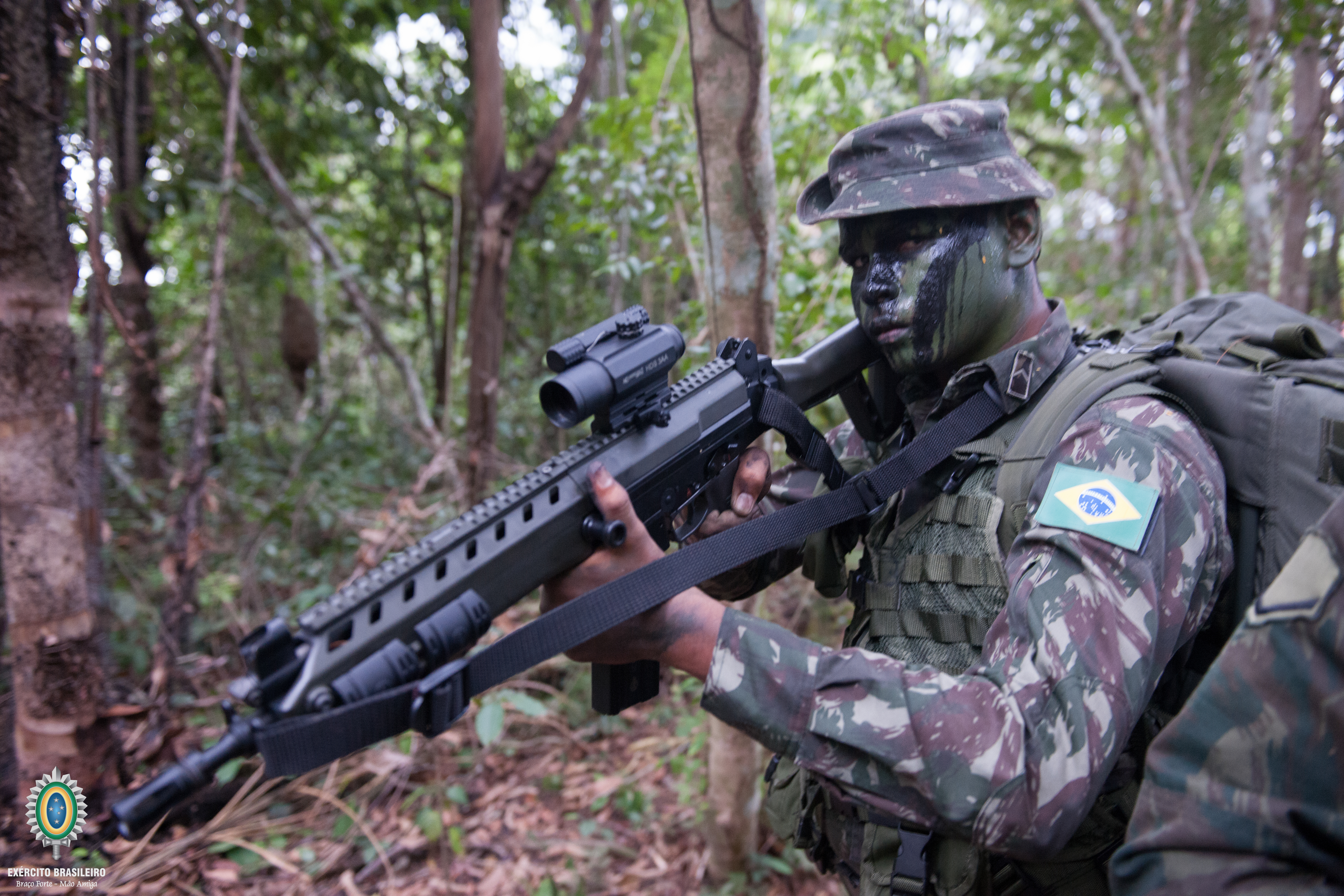
Brazilian soldier with the IA2 5.56

The IMBEL IA2 comes in 2 calibers: 5.56×45mm NATO and 7.62×51mm NATO. The IA2 7.62 variants still uses the FN FAL operating system (tilting breechblock) compared to the IA2 5.56's rotating bolt.

The IA2 makes extensive use of polymers, and features a non-reciprocating cocking handle on the left side of the receiver. The charging handle is the same as in the FAL, and is not capable of folding like the one in the FAL Para.

The IA2 5.56 variants uses STANAG magazines, while the IA2 7.62 variants uses FN FAL-pattern magazines. There is a magazine release button on the right side of the IA2, as well as a paddle magazine release between the magazine and the trigger guard, similar with the FN FAL.

The IA2 uses the same sight as the Para-FAL, a flip-up 2 position sight with positions of 150 and 250 meters, manually adjustable in the horizontal plane without the need for screwdrivers or other tools. The sight mass is also the same as the FAL, adjustable in height. The IA2's gas system is manually adjustable. The gas piston can be easily removed for maintenance by twisting the gas port to the disassembly position, and the rifle comes equipped with a cleaning kit. The bolt remains open on the last shot of a magazine.

The handguard has an internal heat-deflecting aluminum plate, which allows up to 200 shots in a row without overheating, unlike the FAL, which did not exceed 60. The handguard is designed to be tightly attached to the rifle, unlike the FAL which due to its age had its own worn and loose, which also caused noise. Due to integrated Picatinny rails, the IA2 supports a wide range of equipment and accessories such as scopes, flashlights, grenade launchers, lasers, etc. The barrel is equipped with a standard NATO flash hider, and supports the use of rifle grenades. The rifle can be equipped with an IA2 or AMZ bayonet, manufactured by IMBEL.

Relative to the previous MD-97, the rifle had its ergonomics improved, with a reduced size and improved grip, which breaks one of the main similarities between the MD-97 and the FAL. The polymer grip, much more ergonomic than in previous rifles, allows for a more comfortable positioning of the hand in standing, kneeling and lying positions, in addition to having a polymer trigger guard integrated into the piece, avoiding the surfaces of metal contact of the previous model, which caused certain injuries in rough handling and resulted in problems in the cold.

Initially, in the IA2 5.56 variants, a telescopic polymer stock was designed, with a modern design, very similar to the one used in the FN SCAR, and in the IA2 7.62 variants, a collapsible polymer stock very similar to that of the M964A1 Para-FAL, with modern design. Over time, the stock of the IA2 5.56 was abandoned, being supplanted by the stock of the IA2 7.62 variants, as it is cheaper and easier to manufacture. The butt plate has high-resistance rubber to soften the impact of the rifle's recoil. The stock's polymer coating prevents facial skin contact with metal surfaces, making it useful in operations at extreme temperatures. The stock can be folded without pressing any button; however, as a way to keep it safely in the folded position, there is a locking system that joins the top of the stock with the cartridge case deflector.

== Variants ==
=== IA2 5.56 ===
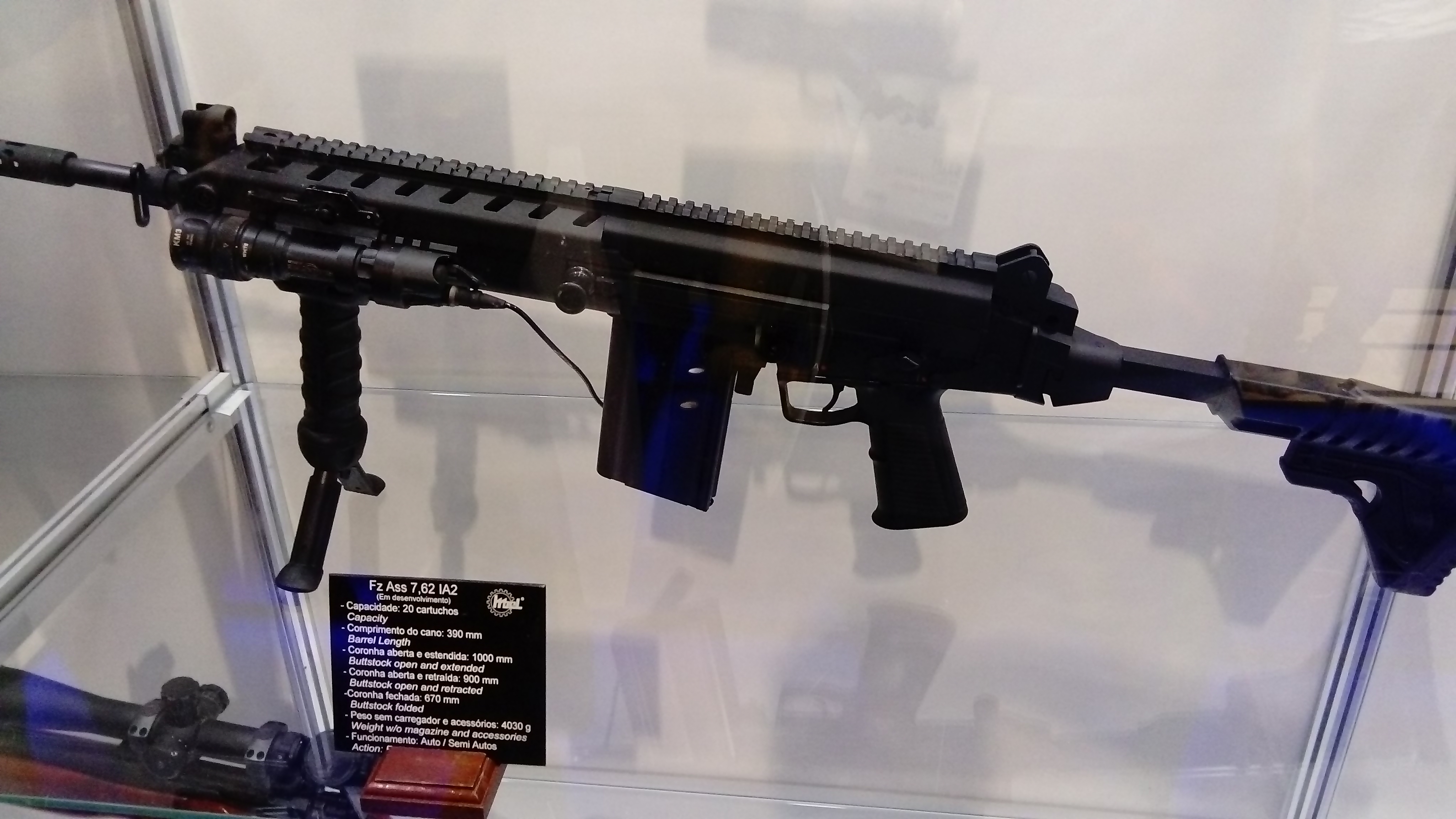
IMBEL IA2 7.62 displayed at LAAD 2017

The IMBEL IA2 5.56 is chambered in 5.56×45mm NATO cartridge, uses STANAG magazines, features a 350 mm (13.8 in) barrel length, and was developed for the Brazilian Army and police forces. It is available in select fire configuration (assault rifle variant) and semi-automatic only configuration (carbine variant). A prototype with a 480 mm (18.9 in) barrel length was also developed but never produced. A .22 LR conversion kit is available for training.

=== IA2 7.62 ===
The IMBEL IA2 7.62 is chambered in 7.62×51mm NATO cartridge, uses FN FAL-pattern magazines, and was developed for the Brazilian Army and police forces. It features a muzzle brake or flash hider and two different barrel lengths: 389 mm (15.3 in) and 265 mm (10.4 in). The IA2 7.62 is also available in select fire configuration and semi-automatic only configuration.

=== IA2 SMG ===
The IA2 SMG is a prototype variant of the IA2 chambered in either .380 ACP and .40 S&W. The prototypes were intended to become submachine gun variants of the already existing IA2 series of rifles, while retaining compatibility with most IA2 parts. Both the .40 S&W version and .380 ACP version can use magazines from IMBEL made handguns such as the GC MD2, and TC MD6. It also features a unique carry handle with built in iron sights.

== See also ==
- AK-12
- Beretta ARX160
- Colt CM901
- CZ 805 BREN
- FB MSBS Grot
- Galil ACE

== Sources ==
- "PM se arma contra crime organizado" (in Portuguese). JCNET. 2015-06-19.
- Tahiane Stochero Do G1, em São Paulo (2014-10-31). "G1 - Exército testa novo fuzil que substituirá o adotado há 50 anos - notícias em Política" (in Portuguese). G1.globo.com.
