= Special Operations Unit =

Special Operations Unit may refer to:

- Boston Police Special Operations Unit
- Special Operations Unit (Serbia), a former police unit of the State Security Service
- Special Operations Unit (North Macedonia), a Macedonian police unit
- Unidad de Operaciones Especiales, a former unit of the Spanish Navy and Marines
- Special Operations Unit (Slovenia), an elite unit of the Slovenian Armed Forces

== See also ==
- List of special operations units
- Special Operations Group (disambiguation)
