= IMBEL =

Brazilian defence company

Indústria de Material Bélico do Brasil
- Type: Joint Stock
- Industry: Defense
- Founded: 1934; 92 years ago
- Headquarters: Piquete, Brazil
- Key people: Guido Amin Naves
- Products: Small arms, and ammunition
- Revenue: ▲ R$115 million (2022)
- Operating income: ▲ R$30 million (2022)
- Net income: ▲ R$83 million (2022)
- Number of employees: 1,912 (2022)
- Website: imbel.gov.br

Indústria de Material Bélico do Brasil (IMBEL; English: Brazilian War Material Industry) is a Ministry of Defence quango, founded in 1975, which coordinates industrial activity related to the planning and production of war material through the transfer of technology and the financial and technical support of new military development.

== History ==
=== Background ===
The company has its roots from 1808, when the King of Portugal, Dom João VI, created the Real Fábrica de Pólvora (English: Royal Gunpowder Factory), established in the area where the Rodrigo de Freitas Lagoon Farm was located. In 1826 it was transferred to the city of Magé in the state of Rio de Janeiro, under the name of Real Fábrica de Pólvora da Estrela (English: Royal Gunpowder Factory of Estrela), by decree of the Emperor Pedro I.

From 1939, it was restructured and renamed Fábrica da Estrela (English: Estrela Factory), functioning as a Military Organization of the Ministry of the Army until the creation of IMBEL in 1975.

=== Foundation ===
IMBEL was founded on July 16, 1934, in the city of Itajubá, Minas Gerais, Brazil. The original factory was designated Fábrica de Canos e Sabres para Armas Portáteis (English: Barrels and Sabres Factory for Portable Arms) and later Fabrica de Itajubá (FI), which directly involved the Brazilian Army in the production of military material.

On July 14, 1975, Law no. 6227 created Indústria de Material Bélico do Brasil (IMBEL), linked to the Ministry of the Army, with the purpose of promoting the war material industry of interest to the army based on private investment. The organisation's remit was later expanded to promoting the military material industry in Brazil. It was initially involved in manufacturing Mauser rifles.

== Products ==
- IA2, a new rifle designed to be the replacement for their FALs. It uses many polymer parts and a redesigned bolt. It has a low recoil and passed the Brazilian Army's test. The rifle is still being evaluated by the Brazilian Navy and the Brazilian Air Force (2013/set).
- MD-2 and MD-3 Rifles - A licensed copy of the FN FAL called the Fuzil Automático Leve (FAL) manufactured by FI (Fábrica de Itajubá). Brazil took a delivery of a small number of FN-made FAL rifles for evaluation as early as 1954. Troop field testing was performed with FN-made FALs between 1958 and 1962. In 1964, Brazil officially adopted the rifle, designating the rifle M964 for the year. Licensed production started shortly afterwards at IMBEL in the Itajubá plant. The folding-stock version was designated M964A1. By the late 1980s to early 1990s IMBEL had manufactured some 200,000 M964 rifles. Most Brazilian-made FALs are characterized by their 'slab-sided' late-type receivers with external lightening cuts omitted, a feature which simplifies production and lowers cost. Early FN-made FALs for Brazil are typical FN 1964 models with Type 1 or Type 2 receivers (with lightening cuts), plastic stock, handguard, and pistol grip, 22 mm cylindrical flash hider for grenade launching, and plastic model "D" carrying handle. A heavy-barrel version, known as the FAP (Fuzil Automático Pesado, heavy automatic rifle) was also produced for the armed forces, to be used as a squad automatic weapon.
  - FAL Variants - Brazil also makes its own FAL variants, known as the MD-2 and MD-3 assault rifles, manufactured by IMBEL. The first prototype, the MD-1, appeared around 1983. In 1985, the MD-2 was presented and adopted by the Brazilian Armed Forces. The MD-2/MD-3 is very similar to the FAL, the main design differences being the locking system, which was replaced by an M16-type rotating bolt, and its chambering for the 5.56×45mm NATO cartridge. The MD-2 and MD-3 use M16-compatible magazines; the MD-2 features a side-folding stock, and the MD-3 uses the same fixed polymer stock as the FAL.
  - SAR 48 - IMBEL produced a semi-automatic version of the FAL for Springfield Armory, Inc. (not to be confused with the US military Springfield Armory), which was marketed in the US as the SAR-48 and SAR-4800, starting in the mid-1980s. Early SAR-48s were simply selective-fire M964 FALs which were modified to semi-auto-only by replacing the safety sear with a thick washer soldered in its place.
  - IMBEL MD2A1, a 9mm submachine gun adaptation of the MD-2 rifle.
- Itajubá Model 954, a clone of the Gewehr 43.
- Itajubá Model 968 Mosquefal, derivative of the Gewehr 98.
- The IMBEL MD97 assault rifle family was developed to replace IMBEL MD-2 and MD-3 rifles that were in use with the Brazilian military. The MD-97 is based on the MD-2. The IMBEL MD-97 assault rifle family consists of three models with different dimensions and weight. The MD-97 family can be fed from standard STANAG magazines. Assault rifles are available with fixed or folding buttstocks. The barrel life is a relatively short 6,000 rounds. The MD-97 also has a brass deflector.
  - The MD-97L is intended for the Brazilian Armed Forces, a similar design to the IMBEL MD-2 with a gas-operated action with rotating bolt. The "L" stands for "Leve" or "Light". This assault rifle is chambered for standard NATO 5.56×45mm rounds. It has a selective-fire mode-changer and fires in single-, burst- and full-auto modes. It can penetrate 3.5 mm of ballistic plate at a distance of 600 meters. It is the only MD-97 family rifle that can be fitted with an under-barrel grenade launcher.
  - MD-97LC carbine is a shortened single-shot-mode-only version of the MD-97L, intended for police forces. The "LC" stands for "Leve/Curto" or "Light/Short". It has reduced weight and length. It can penetrate 3.5 mm ballistic plate at a distance of 300 meters.
  - MD-97LM carbine is a single- and fully automatic model. It is an assault rifle with a sound suppressor and grenade launcher, with a Picatinny rail for various sights and accessories.
- The ALAC (pt: Arma Leve Anticarro), (English: Light Antitank Weapon)
- M1911 pistols: Project Colt - IMBEL acquired a manufacturing license for the M1911 pistol, and has exported pistols to the United States of America through Springfield Armory, Inc. (sold under the Springfield Armory brand) since 1985. It produces .380 ACP, 9mm Parabellum, .40 S&W and .45 ACP models.

== See also ==
- Defense industry of Brazil
