= IMBEL MD =

MD-2
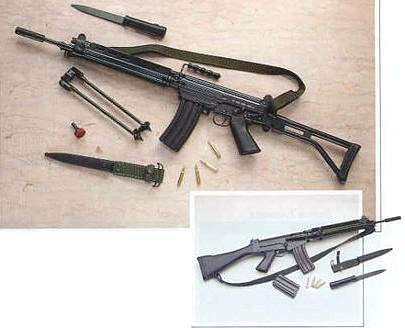
- The MD-2 rifle
- Type: Assault rifle
- Place of origin: Brazil

Service history
- Used by: Brazilian Army, Brazilian Navy, Brazilian Military Police, Battalion of Special Operations, Batalhão de Operações Policiais Especiais and National Force (Brazil)

Production history
- Designed: 1983
- Manufacturer: IMBEL
- Produced: 1985 -
- Variants: MD-1, MD-2, MD-3 and MD-4

Specifications
- Mass: 4.40 kg (9 lb 10 oz)
- Length: 1,010 mm (39.8 in) (stock extended); 764 mm (30.1 in), stock folded
- Barrel length: 453 mm (17.8 in)
- Cartridge: 5.56×45mm NATO (STANAG 4172)
- Caliber: 5.56mm
- Action: Gas-operated, rotating bolt
- Rate of fire: 700 rounds/min
- Effective firing range: 300 m (~328 yd)
- Feed system: Various STANAG Magazines.
- Sights: Aperture rear sight, hooded post front sight

The IMBEL MD series (MD-1, MD-2, MD-3 and the recent MD-4) of assault rifles are the standard-issue rifles of the Brazilian Army.

== History ==
These rifles are manufactured by IMBEL (Indústria de Material Bélico do Brasil) and are based on the 7.62mm NATO FN FAL, which was previously manufactured by IMBEL for many years under licence as the Brazilian Army's standard service rifle. In following the trend to adopt the 5.56×45mm NATO round, IMBEL started experimenting with 5.56mm versions of the FN FAL in the early 1980s. The first prototype, the MD-1, appeared in around 1983. Further development resulted in the MD-2 and MD-3 series, which still closely resemble their FAL parent.

== Design ==
The MD-2 and MD-3 rifles are the result of redesigning the FN FAL to use the 5.56×45mm NATO round in place of the FAL's 7.62mm NATO chambering. The MD-2/MD-3 series externally resembles a short-barrelled FAL, but with an M16 magazine.

Early MD-1 prototypes retained the FAL-type tilting bolt with a locking shoulder immediately behind the magazine well. This was found to not work well with the 5.56mm round, so subsequent prototypes and the final design incorporated an M16-type 7-lug rotating bolt into the design. The FAL's short-stroke gas piston, which is actuated by gas bled from the barrel via a vent located in the foresight housing, and which impinges upon the separate bolt carrier, is retained.

Feeding is from STANAG 4179 M16-compatible magazines. The versions differ in that the MD-2 uses the side-folding buttstock from the FN FAL 'para' variant, while the MD-3 uses the fixed polymer stock of the standard FAL. The MD-2 series contains many FAL-derived parts, some of which remain interchangeable with the original FAL, and others which are modified to suit the new design.
