= Trams in Braunschweig =

Coordinates: 52°15′45″N 10°31′34″E

Straßenbahn Braunschweig
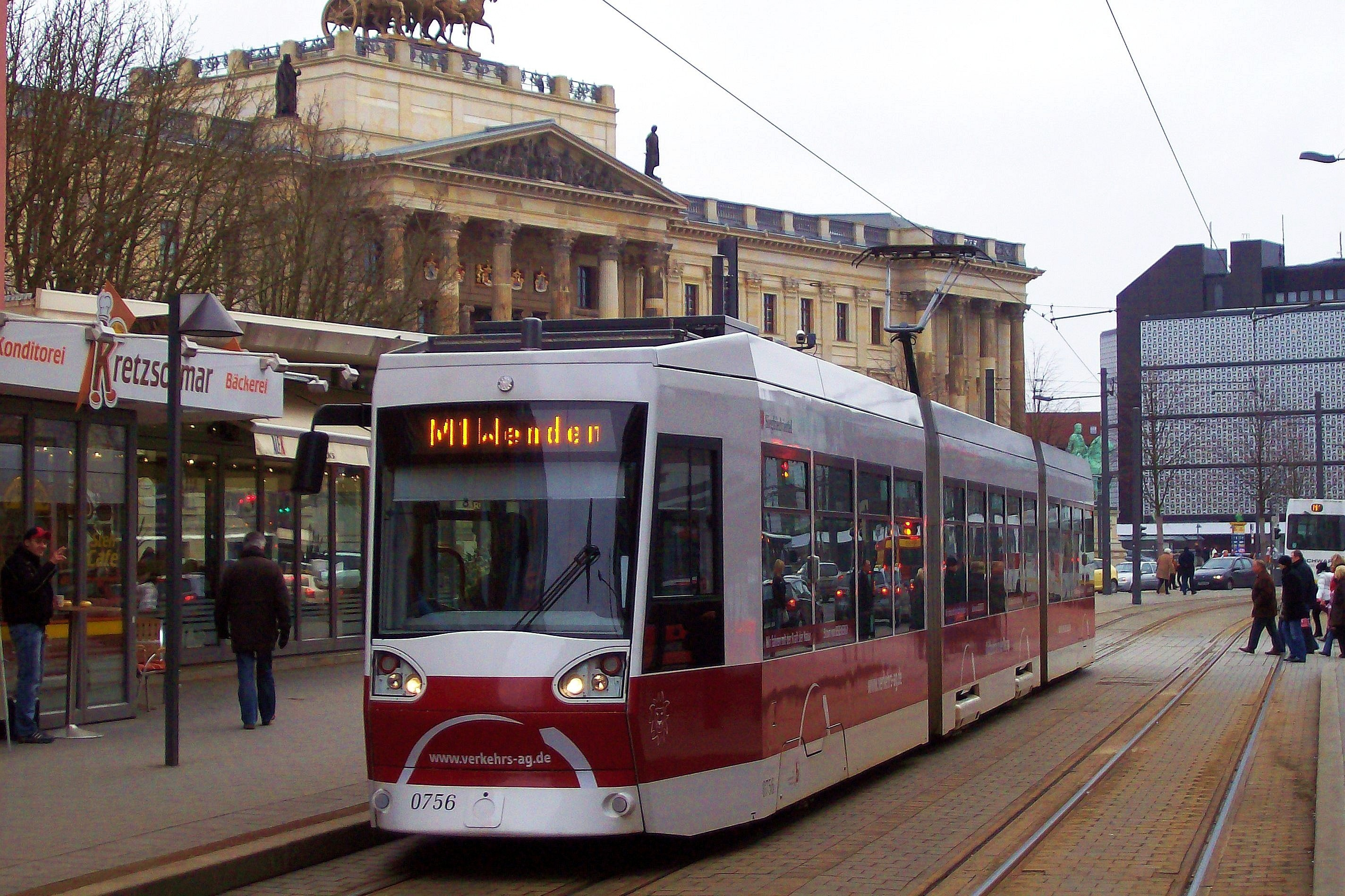
- An Alstom NGT8D tram in the Bohlweg, 2009

Operation
- Locale: Braunschweig, Lower Saxony, Germany

Statistics
Horsecar era: 1879–ca. 1897
- Status: Converted to electricity
- Track gauge: 1,100 mm (3 ft 7 5/16 in)
- Propulsion system: Horses
Electric tram era: since 1897
- Status: Open
- Lines: 6
- Operator: Braunschweiger Verkehrs-AG
- Track gauge: 1,100 mm (3 ft 7 5/16 in)
- Propulsion system: Electricity
- Electrification: 600 V DC wire
- Route length: 39.62 km (24.62 mi)
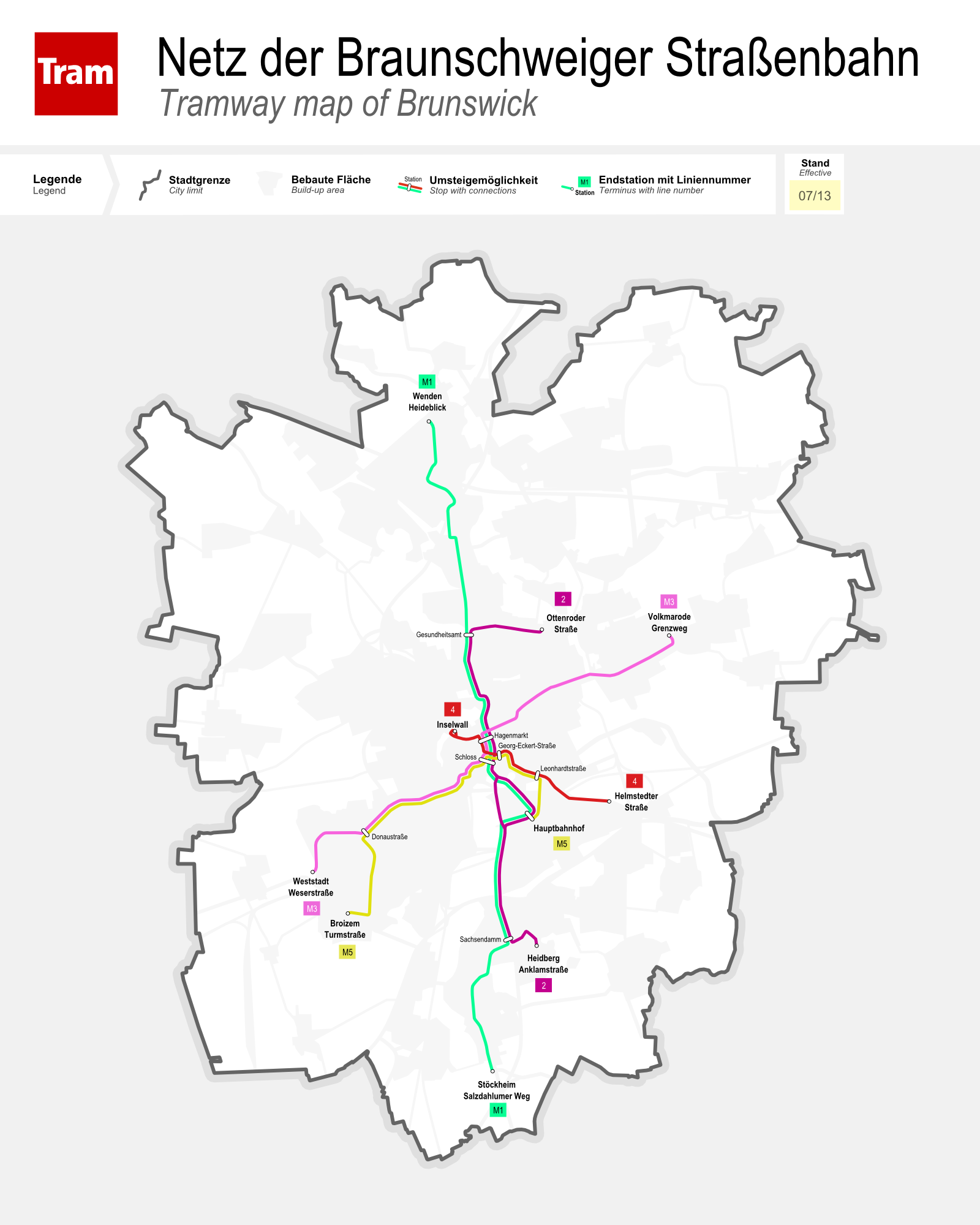
- Website: https://www.bsvg.net/ Braunschweiger Verkehrs-GmbH (in German)

The Braunschweig tramway (German: Straßenbahn Braunschweig) is a network of tramways forming part of the public transport system in Braunschweig, a city in Lower Saxony, Germany.

Opened in 1879, the network has been operated since its inception by the company now known as Braunschweiger Verkehrs GmbH (formerly Braunschweiger Verkehrs-AG), and is integrated in the Verkehrsverbund Region Braunschweig (VRB).

Line	Termini	Average speed	Frequency	Maximum speed	Routes	Notes
1	Stöckheim – Wenden	33 km/h	15 Min	70 km/h	Stöckheim – Melverode – (Heidberg) – Hauptbahnhof – Rathaus – Hamburger Straße – Stadion – Rühme - Wenden	
2	Heidberg – Siegfriedviertel	25.25 km/h	15 min	70 km/h	Heidberg – Hauptbahnhof/Leisewitzstraße – Rathaus – Hamburger Straße – Siegfriedviertel	
3	Weststadt Weserstraße – Volkmarode	26.6 km/h	7½ Min	70 km/h	Weststadt Weserstraße – Donauknoten – Cyriaksring – Europaplatz – Friedrich-Wilhelm-Straße – Rathaus – Hagenmarkt - Gliesmarode - Volkmarode	
4 |	Helmstedter Straße – Radeklint	20.25 km/h	15 Min	70 km/h	Helmstedter Straße – Am Magnitor – Rathaus – Radeklint	
5	Broitzem – Hauptbahnhof	21.5 km/h	15 Min	70 km/h	Broitzem – Weststadt Donauknoten – Cyriaksring – Europaplatz – Friedrich-Wilhelm-Straße – Schloss – Am Magnitor – Hauptbahnhof	
10	Hauptbahnhof - Rühme	30.26 km/h	15 Min	70 km/h	Hauptbahnhof – Rathaus – Hamburger Straße – Stadion – Rühme	On schooldays between approximately 06:00 and 19:00

Around 88,000 to 100,000 passengers use the trams on a daily basis.

== See also ==
- List of town tramway systems in Germany
- Trams in Germany
