= Escadaria Selarón =

Set of steps in Rio de Janeiro, Brazil

Selarón's Steps
- Stairway
- Escadaria Selarón (Portuguese)
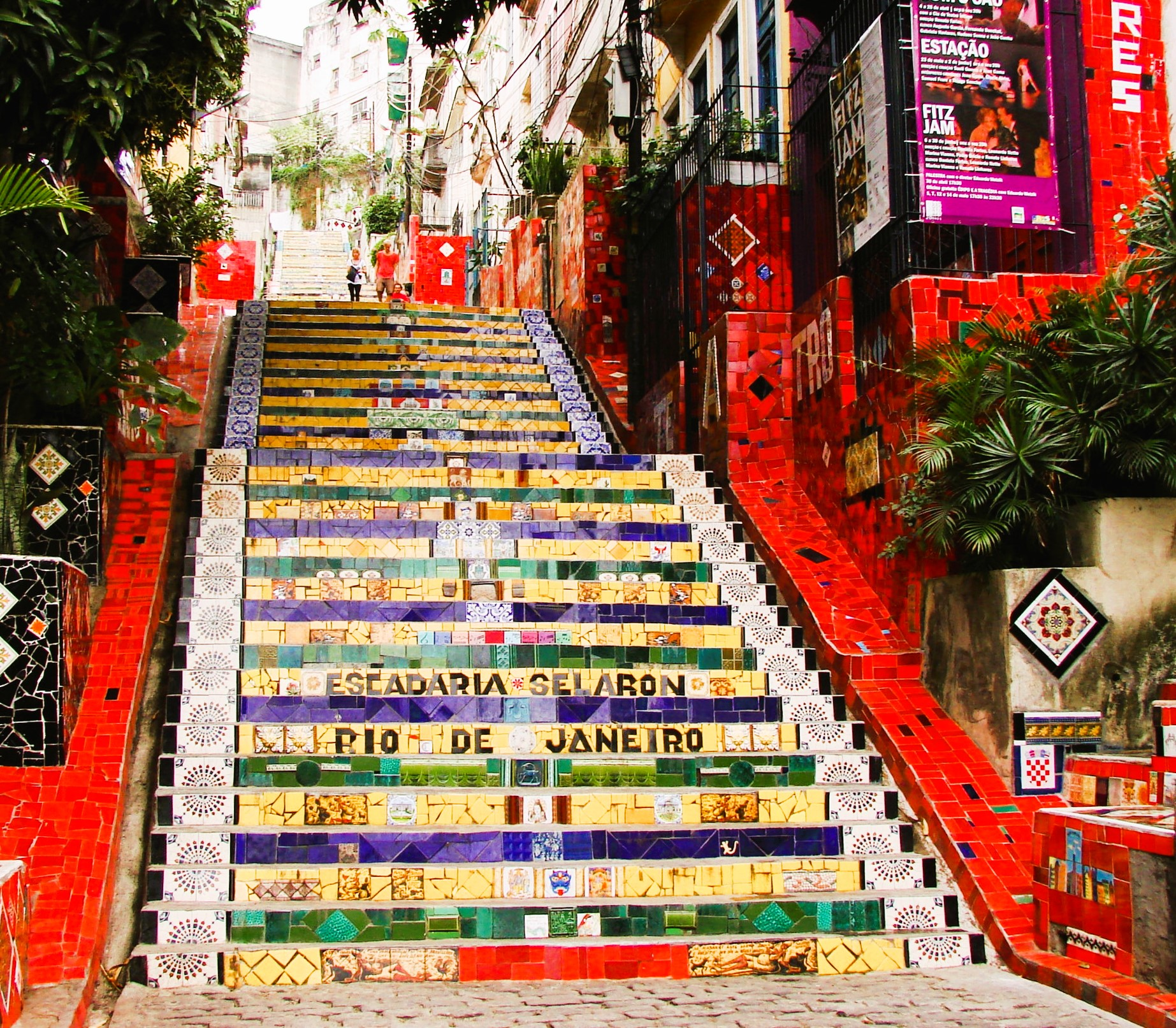
- Escadaria Selarón
- Design: Jorge Selarón
- Constructed: 1990–2013
- Steps: 215
- Height: 125 metres (410 ft)
- Surface: ceramic tile
- Location: Rio de Janeiro, Brazil
- Location within Rio de Janeiro
- Coordinates: 22°54′51.56″S 43°10′44.23″W

Escadaria Selarón, locally known as the 'Lapa Steps' (Escadaria da Lapa) for being situated at the "Lapa" neighborhood, is a set of world-famous steps in Rio de Janeiro, Brazil. They are the work of Chilean-born artist Jorge Selarón who claimed it as "my tribute to the Brazilian people".

== History ==
In 1990, Selarón began renovating dilapidated steps that ran along the front of his house. At first, neighbours mocked him for his choice of colours as he covered the steps in fragments of blue, green and yellow tiles – the colours of the Brazilian flag. It started out as a side-project to his main passion, painting, but soon became an obsession. He found he was constantly out of money, so Selarón sold paintings to fund his work. It was long and exhausting work but he continued on and eventually covered the entire set of steps in tiles, ceramics and mirrors.

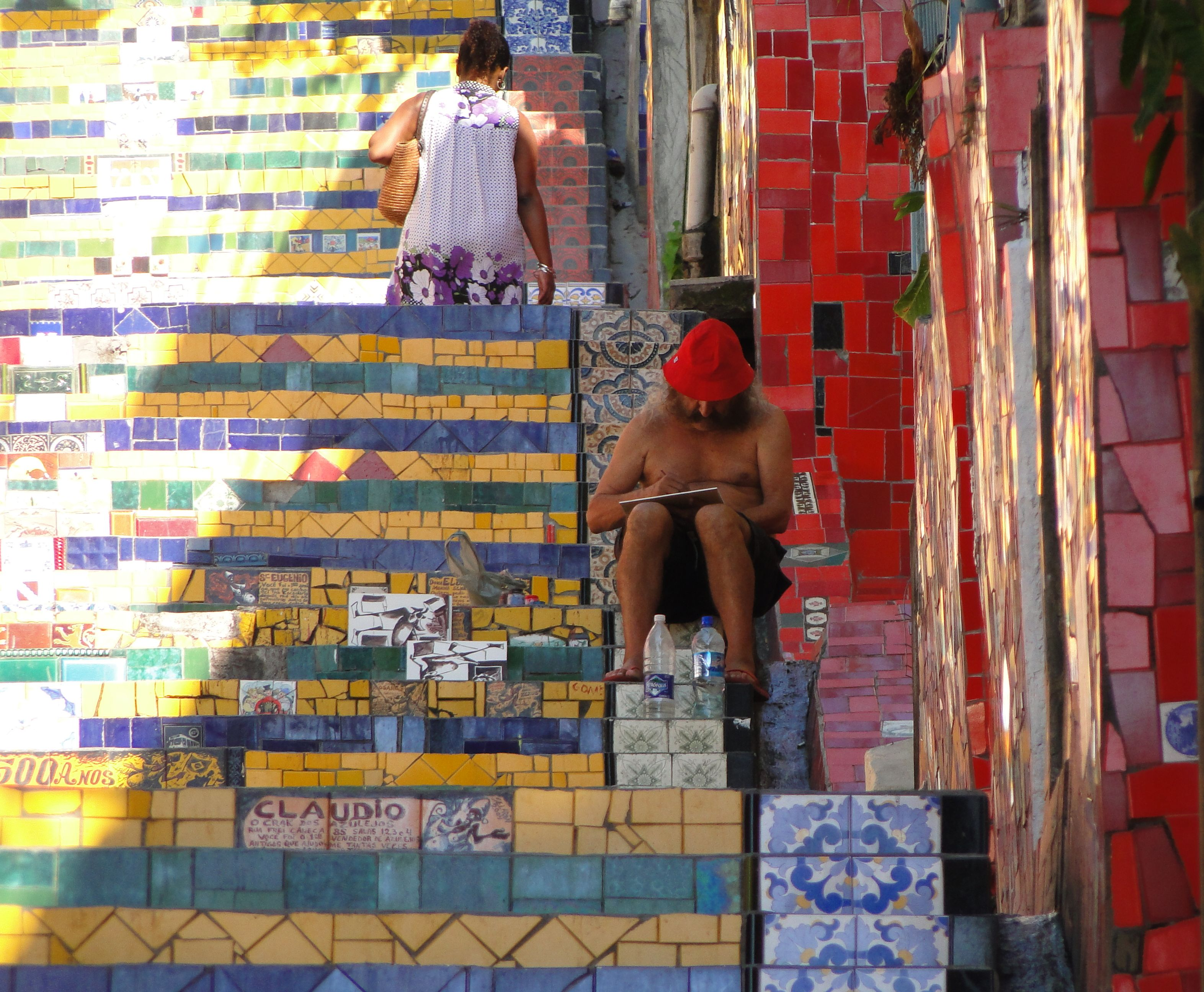
Jorge Selarón painting on the Escadaria, 2010

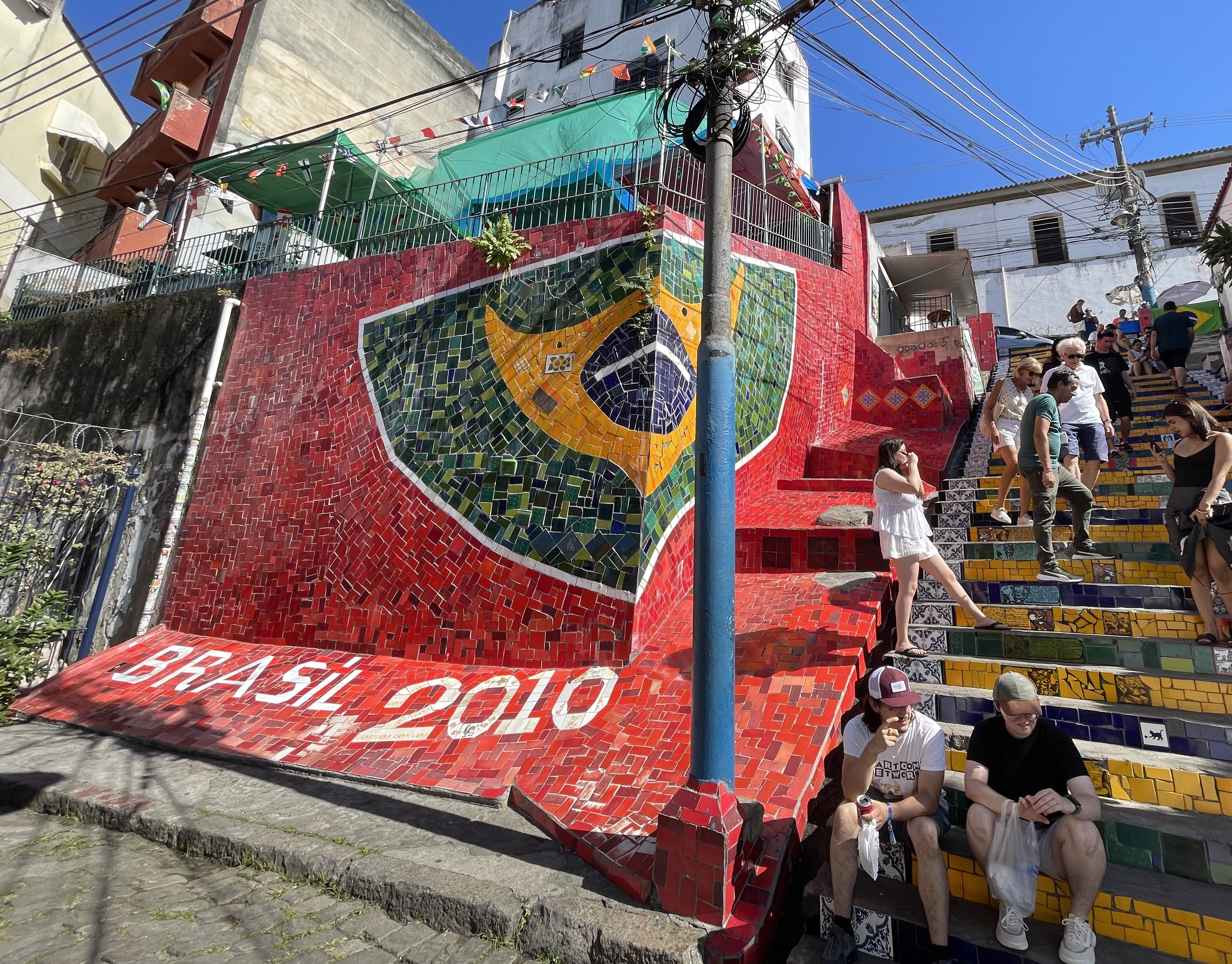
Top section of stairs

== The steps ==
Running from Joaquim Silva street and Pinto Martins street, officially known as Manuel Carneiro street, the steps straddle the Lapa and Santa Teresa neighbourhoods in Rio de Janeiro. There are 215 steps measuring 125 metres (135 yards) long, which are covered in over 2000 tiles collected from over 60 countries around the world. No sooner than one section of the steps was 'finished', Selarón started work on another section, constantly changing it so that it was an ever-evolving piece of art. Selarón considered the work as "never complete" and claimed that "This crazy and unique dream will only end on the day of my death".

Originally, tiles for the work were scavenged from various construction sites and piles of urban waste found on the Rio streets. But in later years, most of the tiles were donated by visitors from all around the world. Of the 2000+ tiles, 300-odd were hand-painted by Selarón depicting a pregnant African woman. Selarón didn't comment on this except to say that it was a "Personal problem from my past".

Eventually the work spilled over to steps at the foot of the Arcos da Lapa.

== Jorge Selarón ==
Jorge Selarón was born in Chile in 1947. He traveled, lived and worked as a painter and sculptor in over 50 countries around the world before arriving and deciding to settle in Rio de Janeiro in 1983. He began painting the steps on a whim in 1990. Many times, his phone was cut off and he was threatened to be evicted from his house due to being unable to afford the living costs. He sold many paintings and accepted donations from locals and travelers to continue his work. Since 1977, Selarón claimed to have sold over 25,000 portraits, all featuring the same pregnant woman which mostly funded his work. It was a labor of love for the artist who resided in the same house by the steps he lived in when he started the work. He was mostly unfazed by the attention given to him by curious onlookers and tourists alike. He was constantly spotted at the steps working by day and treating drunken revelers to fascinating anecdotes by night.

Selarón was found dead on January 10, 2013, on the famous Lapa steps. His body was found with burn marks.

== International recognition ==
It is a tourist attraction of Rio de Janeiro. The work has featured in many magazines, newspapers, travel shows, documentaries and commercials, such as National Geographic Channel, American Express, Coca-Cola, Kellogg's Corn Flakes, Time and Playboy.

It has also featured in numerous music videos, such as U2's "Walk On" in 2001 and Snoop Dogg's "Beautiful".

In 2009 the steps were featured in Rio's 2016 Olympic bid video "The Passion Unites Us". The steps were also featured in the show The Amazing Race (the 18th American season, and later the fourth Latin American version, the second Norwegian season and the third Chinese celebrity season) where teams were tasked to find a tile resembling a route info sign.
