= Favela Santa Marta =

Favela in Rio de Janeiro, Brazil

Coordinates: 22°56′51″S 43°11′38″W

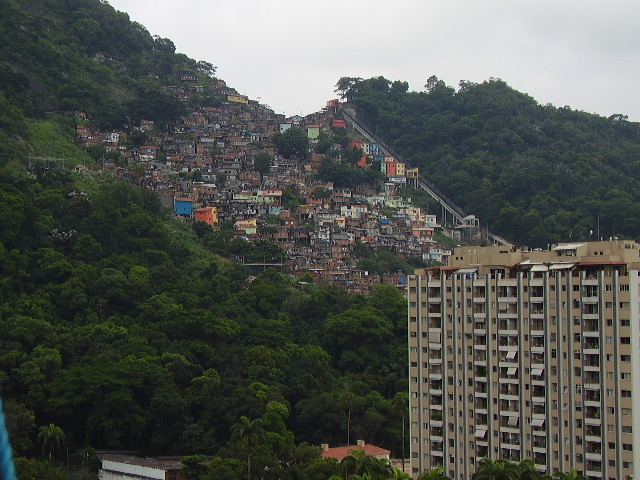
View of Morro Dona Marta.

Favela Santa Marta (Portuguese pronunciation: [fɐˈvɛlɐ ˈsɐ̃tɐ ˈmaʁtɐ], Saint Martha's favela) is a favela located in the Botafogo and Laranjeiras part of the Morro Dona Marta (pronounced [ˈmoʁu ˈdõnɐ ˈmaʁtɐ], Dame Martha's Hill), that is also divided with the neighborhoods of Flamengo, Cosme Velho and Silvestre, in the South Zone of Rio de Janeiro, Brazil. It has about 3,913 residents and 1,287 domiciles, with 500 wooden houses, 2,000 brick houses, 4 kindergartens, 3 bakeries, 2 sports fields, 1 block of a samba school, 3 military units and 1 small market. The favela is one of the steepest in the city, with an altitude of 352 metres (1,155 ft), approximately 45 degrees of inclination and occupies an area equivalent to 53,706 square metres (578,090 sq ft).

The favela has undergone a process of urbanization. Several popular houses were built with sewage, water piping and installation of electrical cables. One of the most important works done in recent years in Dona Marta was the construction of a cable car that facilitates the transport of residents to higher areas of the hill.

Morro Dona Marta, according to the Director Plan of the Municipality of Rio de Jаneiro (2011), is considered a Municipal Landscape Heritage subject to Environmental Protection, having an expressive vegetation of the Atlantic Forest and is included in the Área de Proteção Ambientаl (in English: Environmental Protection Area – APA), created in 1967.

Another major change in Dona Marta was the occupation of military force. On November 28, 2008 the control of Dona Marta was turned to civil police forces when Rio's first Pacifying Police Unit was established there. Between 2008 and 2013 the favela had no drug trafficking activity. Since 2013 criminal activities have raised.

Dona Marta was the shooting location of the music video of They Don't Care About Us by Michael Jackson. It also appeared in Bike Downhill MTB of Redbull and the film Fast Five. Madonna, Alicia Keys and Beyoncé had also visited the community between 2009 and 2010.

On June 26, 2010, a year after the death of American singer Michael Jackson, the State Department of Tourism, Sport and Leisure (SEEL) funded the works of a public space on the slab where the King of Pop had performed in 1996, it's possible to find a statue in his honor.

== Notable people ==
- Márcio Amaro de Oliveira, a.k.a. Marcinho VP do Santa Marta, Brazilian drug lord (Comando Vermelho)

== See also ==
- List of funicular railways
- A Arma Escarlate
