= Braunschweiger Verkehrs-AG =

Braunschweiger Verkehrs AG
- Company type: Aktiengesellschaft
- Industry: public transport
- Predecessors: Elektrizitätswerke und Straßenbahn Braunschweig AG
- Founded: 1879
- Headquarters: Braunschweig, Germany
- Products: transport
- Parent: Aktiengesellschaft für Industrie und Verkehrswesen
- Website: Homepage

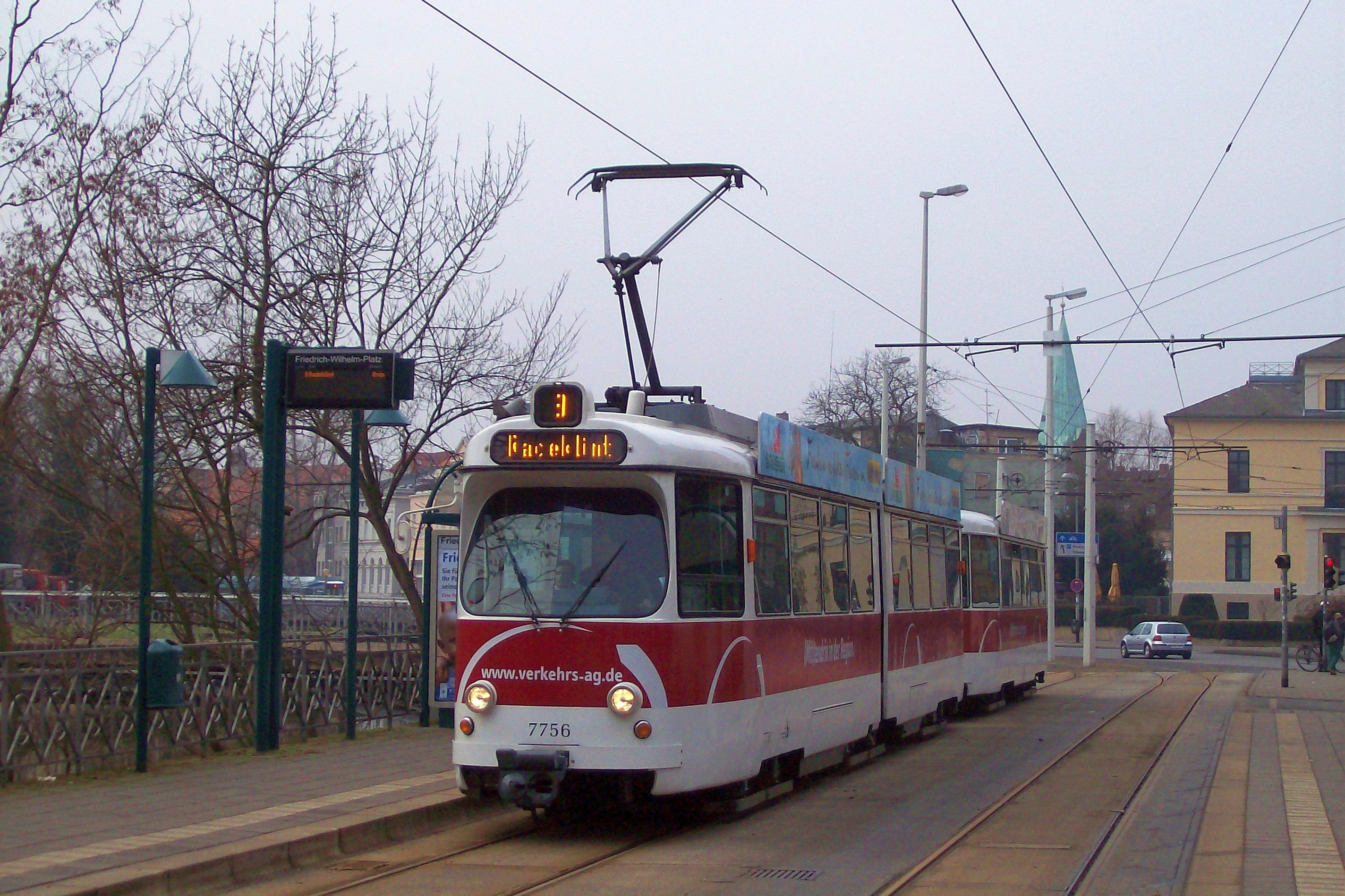
Tram in Braunschweig

The Braunschweiger Verkehrs-AG is responsible for public transport in Braunschweig, Germany.

It uses a track gauge of 1,100 mm (3 ft 7 5/16 in) for its Braunschweig tramway network, a gauge that remains in use on only one other tram system worldwide, Rio de Janeiro's Santa Teresa Tramway.
