= A Arma Escarlate =

2011 novel by Renata Ventura

- Book cover.
- Author: Renata Ventura
- Language: Portuguese
- Genre: Romance; Fantasy
- Published: November 18, 2011
- Publication place: Brazil
- Pages: 552 (1st edition); 448 (2nd edition)
- ISBN: 9788576795445

A Arma Escarlate (English: The Scarlet Weapon) is a 2011 fantasy novel by Brazilian author Renata Ventura and published by Novo Século. The book follows Hugo Escarlate, a boy raised at Favela Santa Marta, Rio de Janeiro, who discovers he is a wizard.

== Synopsis ==
The year is 1997, in the middle of an intense shootout, during one of the bloodiest eras of the Favela Santa Marta, a thirteen-years-old boy discovers he is a wizard.

Sworn death by drug kingpins, Hugo escapes with only one goal in mind: learn enough magic to come back and confront the bandit who is threatening his family. In this learning process, however, he may end up discovering how much of bandit's is inside himself.
