= Carioca Aqueduct =

Aqueduct in Rio de Janeiro, Brazil

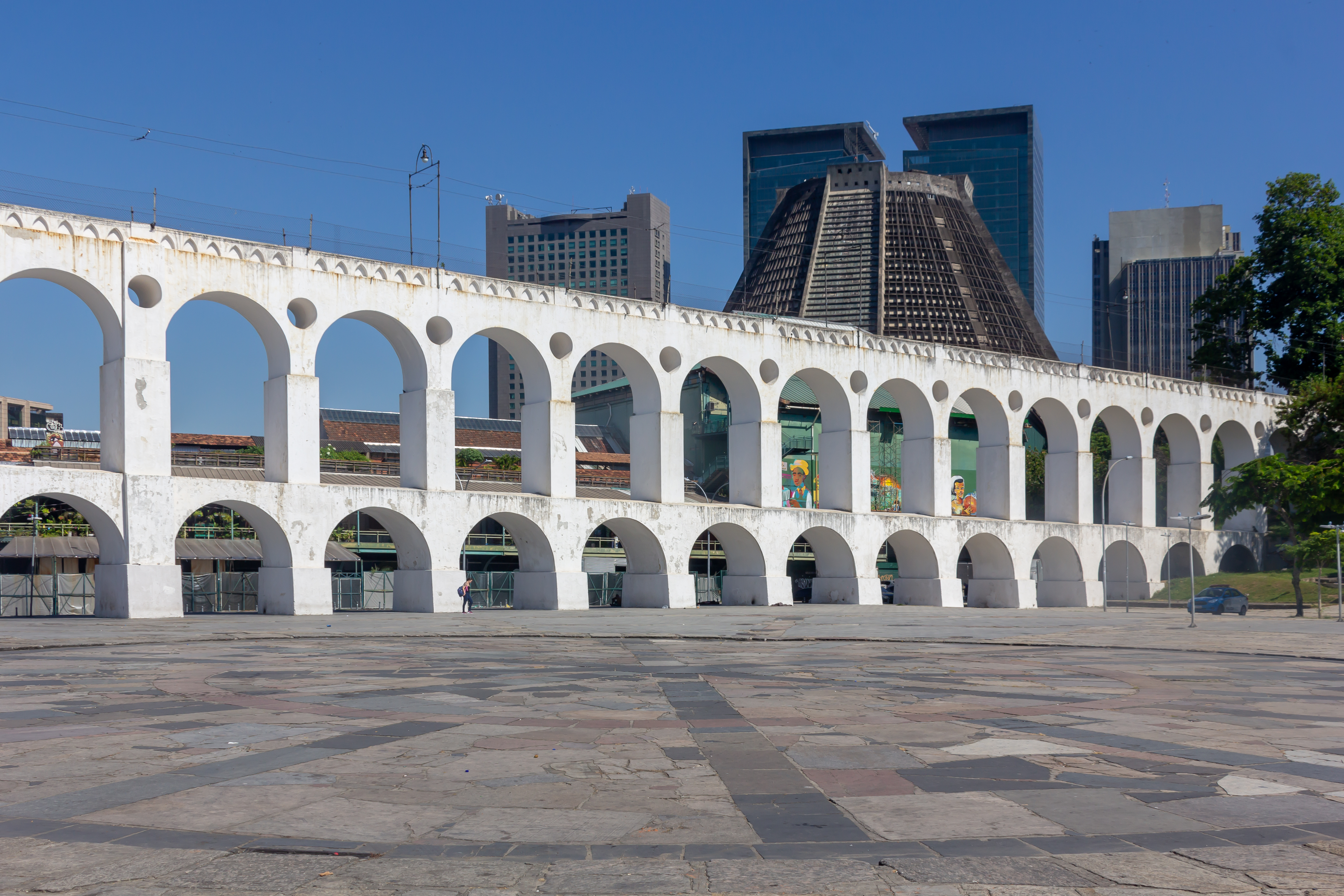
- Coordinates: 22°54′45.34″S 43°10′47.46″W

Characteristics
- Total length: 270 metres (890 ft)
- Height: 64 metres (210 ft)

History
- Construction start: 1718
- Inaugurated: 1750

Location
- Interactive map of Carioca Aqueduct

The Carioca Aqueduct (Portuguese: Aqueduto da Carioca), also known as Arcos da Lapa, is an aqueduct in the city of Rio de Janeiro, Brazil. The aqueduct was built in the middle of the 18th century to bring fresh water from the Carioca River to the population of the city. It is a typical example of colonial architecture and engineering.

The Carioca Aqueduct is located in the centre of the city, in the Lapa neighbourhood. Since the end of the 19th century the aqueduct serves as a bridge for the Santa Teresa Tramway that connects the city centre with the Santa Teresa neighbourhood uphill.

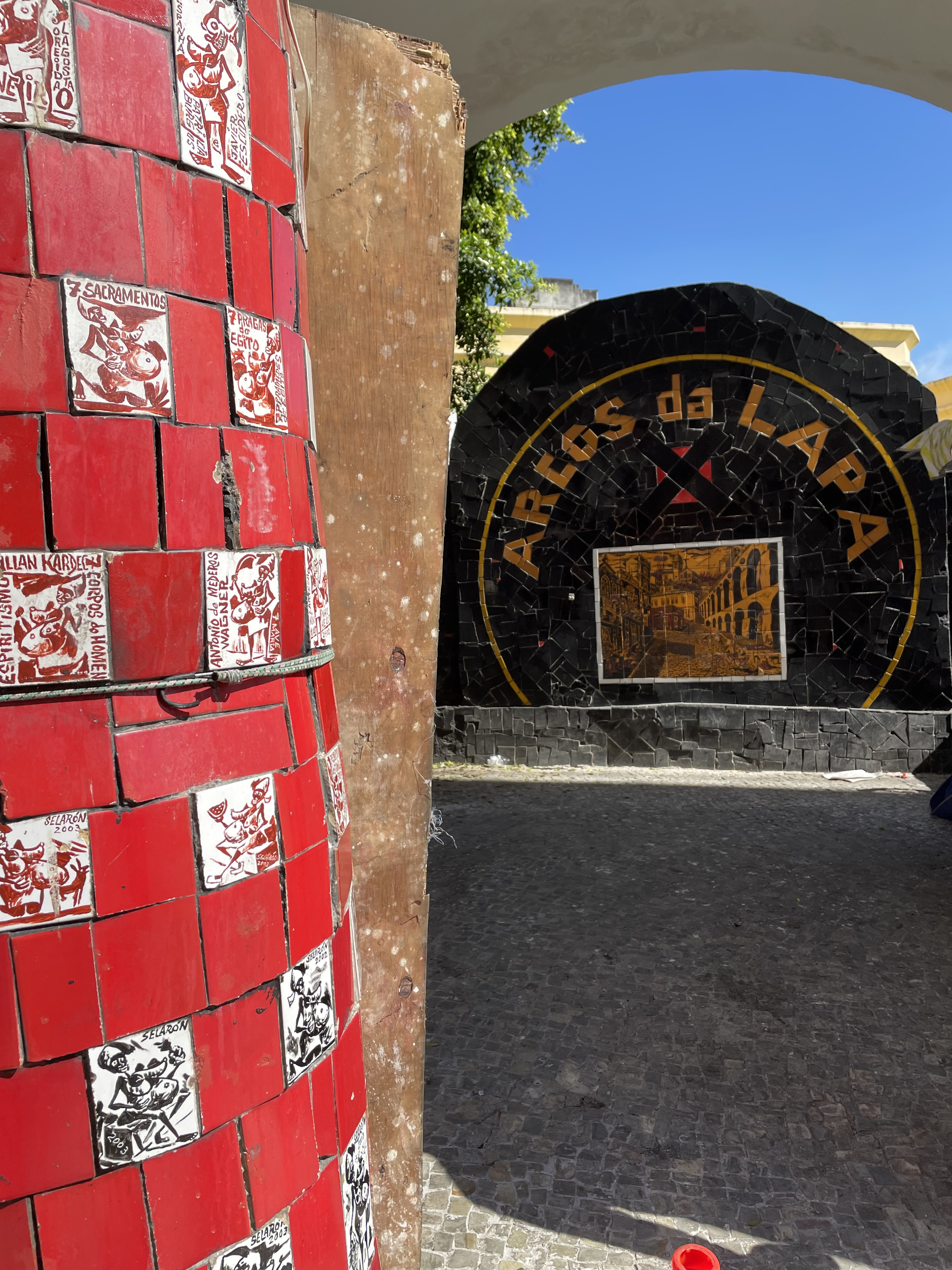
Arcos da Lapa tilework by Jorge Selarón

== History ==
In the early history of Rio de Janeiro, the nucleus of the city was surrounded by swamps with water of bad quality, and fresh water had to be carried manually from streams located relatively far from the city. Since at least 1602 there had been plans to build a system of canals to bring water from the source of the Carioca river, located on Santa Teresa hill, to Rio de Janeiro. Colonial authorities attempted to build canals, but the construction was always hampered by technical and financial difficulties. By the end of the 17th century there were only a few hundred metres of canalisation completed.

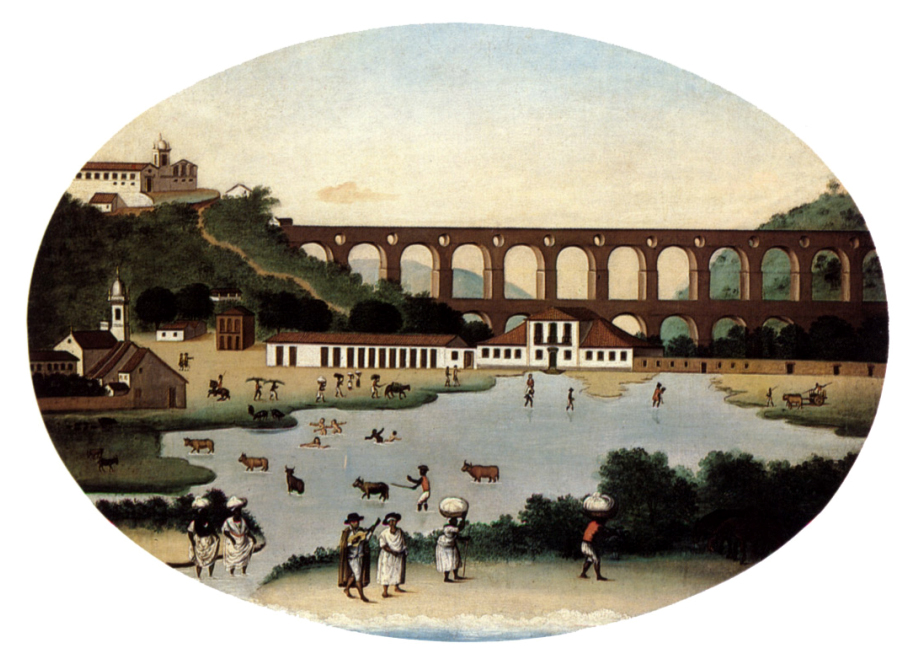
The Carioca Aqueduct by painter Leandro Joaquim (c. 1790). Santa Teresa hill and its convent are seen to the left. The lagoon in the foreground was landfilled to build the Passeio Público.

After 1706, construction of the aqueduct was given a fresh impulse by authorities. During the rule of governor Aires de Saldanha (1719–1725) it was decided that the canals, which at the time reached the Campo da Ajuda (today's Cinelândia square), should reach the Santo Antônio square (today's Largo da Carioca), which was closer to the centre of the city. Construction of the first aqueduct was finished in 1723, and clean water flowed directly to a decorative Baroque fountain in Santo Antônio Square, to the relief of the people of Rio de Janeiro.

This first aqueduct was already in bad shape by 1744, when governor Gomes Freire de Andrade (1733–1763) ordered the building of a new, larger structure. The works were encharged to Portuguese military engineer José Fernandes Pinto Alpoim, who was inspired by similar structures in Portugal, like the Águas Livres Aqueduct in Lisbon. The aqueduct was inaugurated in 1750.

The most impressive feature of the aqueduct is the course that connects the hills of Santa Teresa and Santo Antônio, in today's Lapa neighbourhood. This segment of the aqueduct spans 270 metres and consists of two storeys of monumental arches - 42 in total - with a maximum height of 17.6 metres.

In colonial times, water from the Carioca Aqueduct reached several fountains scattered through Rio de Janeiro, including those in Santo Antônio Square, Ajuda Square (Cinelândia) and the Terreiro do Paço (today's Praça XV). At the end of the 18th century, as the waters of the Carioca river were insufficient to feed the aqueduct, water from other streams were also diverted to its canals.

== Tramway ==
The aqueduct was deactivated at the end of the 19th century, as new alternatives to supply water to Rio were developed. The structure was adapted in 1896 to serve as a viaduct for a tram line – the Bonde de Santa Teresa (Santa Teresa Tramway) – that transports passengers between the centre of Rio and the hilly Santa Teresa neighbourhood. The picturesque ride is popular among locals and tourists alike. The Santa Teresa bonde (or bondinho, meaning "little tram") is the only tram still in operation in Rio de Janeiro, although the 2016-opened Rio de Janeiro Light Rail system is similar to a tramway on some sections.

In the 1960s, several houses which had been built near the aqueduct were demolished, improving the visual impact of the monument.

In August 2011, an accident occurred when brakes apparently failed and left five people dead. In response, all service was indefinitely suspended, but plans to rebuild the line and replace the old tramcars (with faux-vintage replicas) were subsequently approved. Limited service on a portion of the line – including across the former aqueduct – began operating again in July 2015.

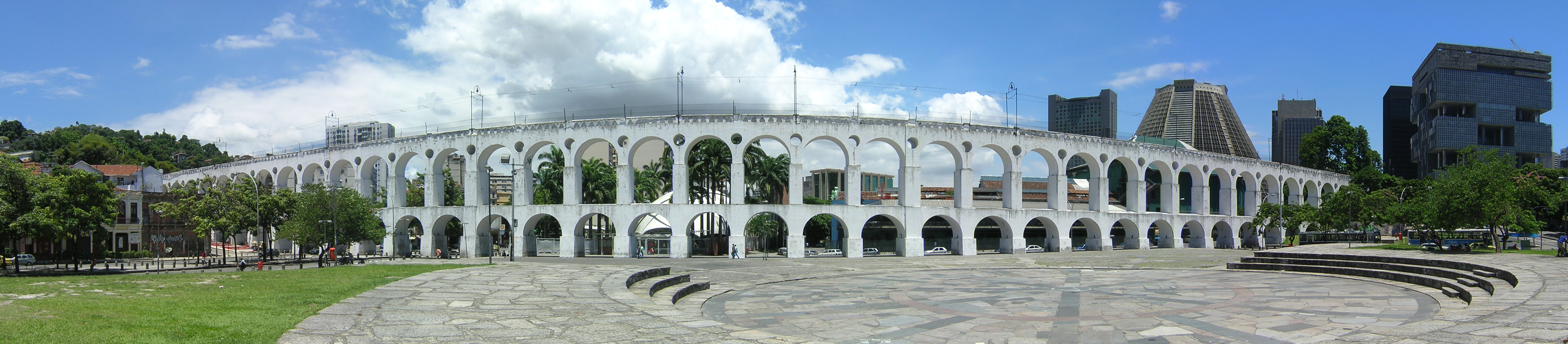
Panoramic view
