= Jorge Selarón =

Chilean painter and ceramist

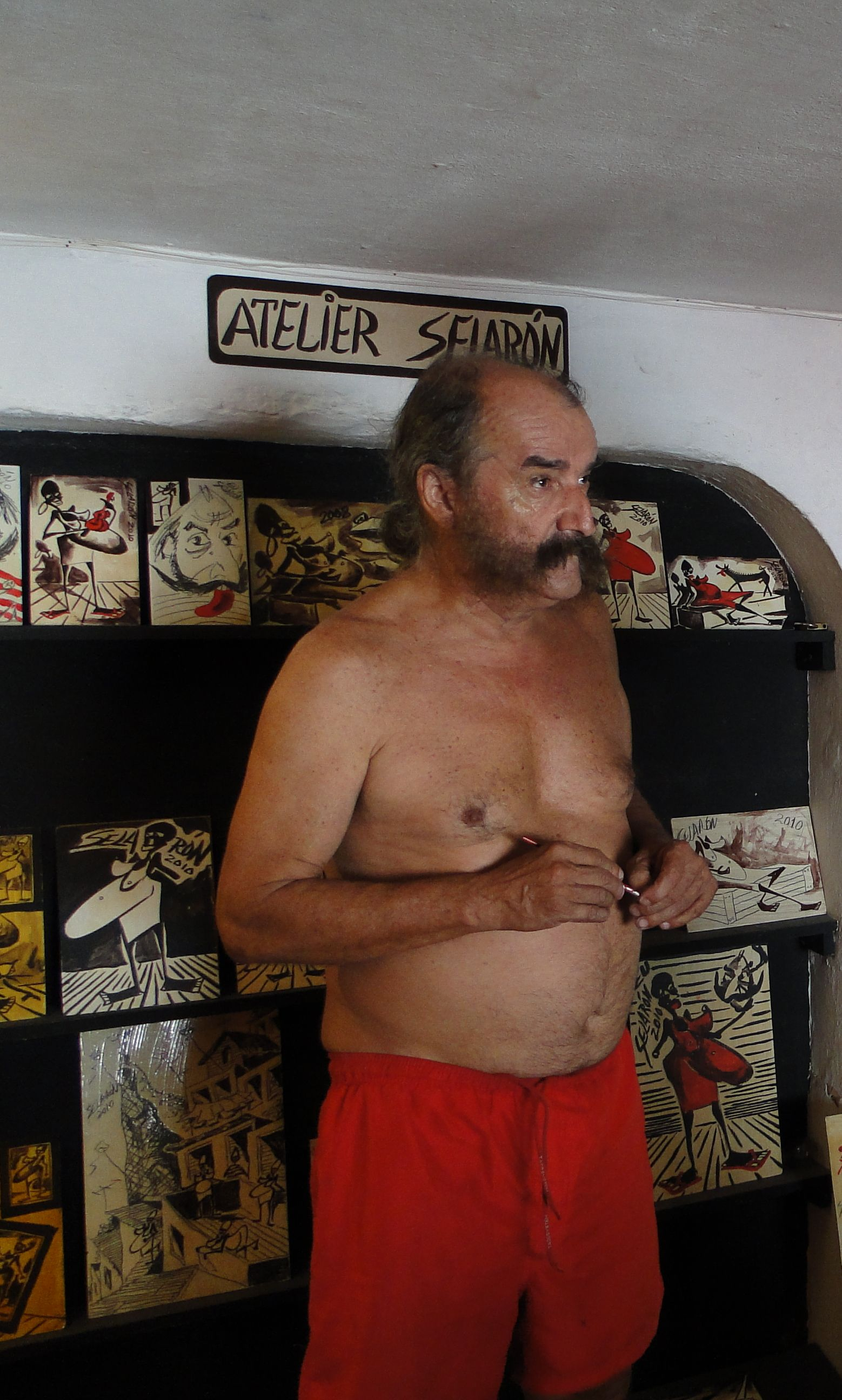
Jorge Selarón in his studio at the Escadaria in 2010

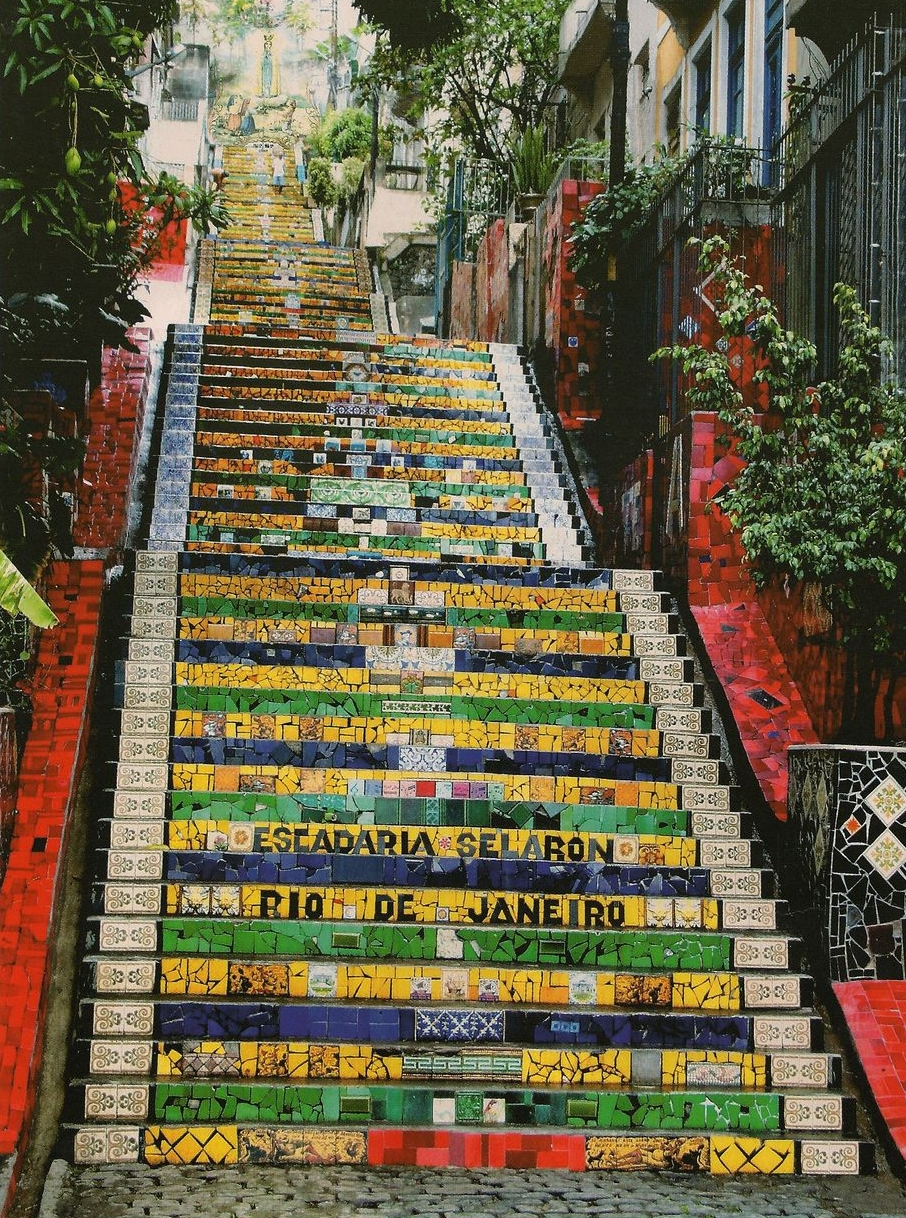
The Escadaria Selarón by Selarón

Jorge Selarón (1947 – January 10, 2013) was a Chilean painter and ceramist. He is perhaps best known for his work on the Escadaria Selarón, a world-famous set of ceramic tile-covered stairs located in the Lapa and Santa Teresa neighborhoods of Rio de Janeiro, Brazil.

== Biography ==
Selarón moved to the Lapa neighborhood of Rio de Janeiro in the 1980s, settling in a house next to the stairs. In 1990, he began decorating the 215 stairs leading up to the Convent of Santa Teresa with ceramic tiles. His artistic transformation of the stairs, using tiles and porcelain donated by friends and supporters, took twenty years to complete. His stairs, which were declared a city landmark in 2005, were featured in Rio de Janeiro's bid for the 2016 Summer Olympics.

Jorge Selarón was found dead on the Escadaria Selarón near his home on January 10, 2013, at the age of 65. His body was found burned on the aforementioned stairs in question. Later in 2013, police has said the main line of investigation was suicide, considering allegations from friends that he was depressed.
