= Santa Teresa Tram =

Tramway in Rio de Janeiro

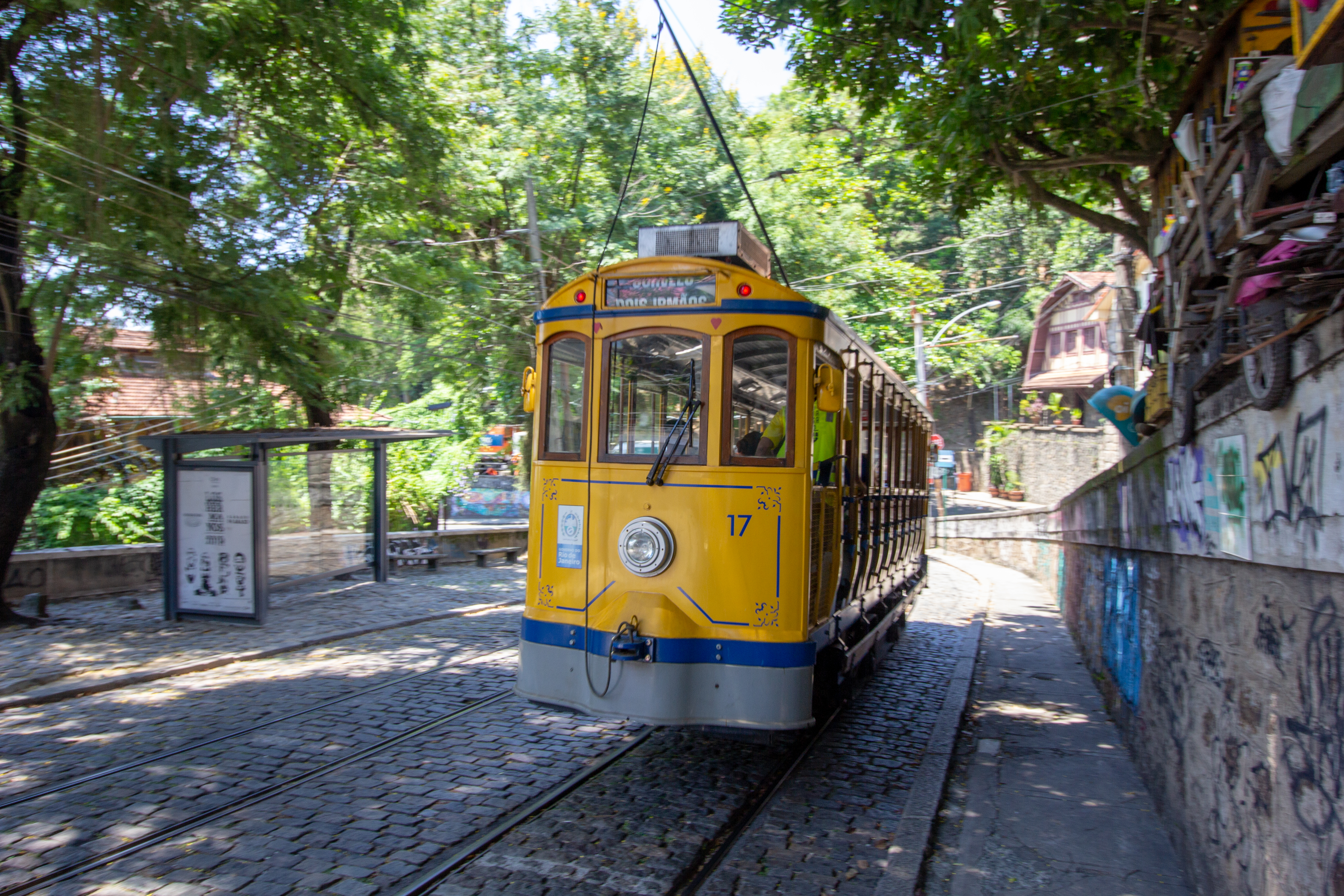
- Tram on a cobblestone-paved section

Overview
- Locale: Santa Teresa, Rio de Janeiro, Brazil
- First service: 13 March 1877 (horsecars); 1 September 1896 (electric trams)
- Current operator: Companhia Estadual de Engenharia de Transportes e Logística
- Website: Official website

Route
- Termini: Carioca; Silvestre
- Stops: 10
- Distance travelled: 6.0 km (3.7 mi) (Carioca–Dois Irmãos); 3.7 km (2.3 mi) (Carioca–Largo das Neves); 8.9 km (5.5 mi) (Carioca–Silvestre); 0.8 km (0.50 mi) (Carioca–Francisco Muratori)
- Service frequency: Every 30 minutes (Carioca–Dois Irmãos); Every 60 minutes (Carioca–Largo das Neves); 4 per day (Carioca–Silvestre); 1 per day (Carioca–Francisco Muratori)

Technical
- Track gauge: 1,100 mm (3 ft 7 5/16 in)
- Electrification: 600 V DC overhead wire
- Track owner: Rio de Janeiro State Government

The Santa Teresa Tram, or Tramway (Portuguese: Bonde de Santa Teresa, IPA: [bõˈdʒi dʒi ˈsɐ̃tɐ teˈɾezɐ]), is a historic tram line in Rio de Janeiro, Brazil. It connects the city's centre with the primarily residential, inner-city neighbourhood of Santa Teresa, in the hills immediately southwest of downtown, which features the tram in many of its local murals.

It is mainly maintained as a tourist attraction and is nowadays considered a heritage tramway system, having been designated a national historic monument in 1985. The line has a very unusual gauge: 1,100 mm (3 ft 7 5/16 in). The main line to Dois Irmãos is 6.0 kilometres (3.7 miles) long, but the 2026-reopened section to Silvestre extends it to approximately 8.9 km (5.5 mi).

Having run continuously since its opening in 1877 (except for a 2011–15 suspension), it is one of the oldest street railway lines in the world. It has been electrically powered since 1896, being the oldest electric railway in all of Latin America. For many years it was also the only remaining metropolitan tram system in Brazil. The only other original tram systems in the country to have survived past 1971 are the Campos do Jordão interurban tram/light rail line, which continues to operate today, and the Itatinga line (near Bertioga), a rural and non-public tram line which had ceased operation as a tramway by 2017. All other cities closed their systems by 1971 (Santos being the last), but since that time, three towns, Belém, Campinas and Santos, have reinstated trams as heritage services. Rio de Janeiro opened a modern light rail/tram system in 2016.

All service on the line was suspended starting in August 2011 as a result of a serious accident, but limited service resumed in July 2015 with new tramcars and with passengers no longer allowed to stand on the running boards. Following studies after the 2011 suspension, it was decided to buy new trams that would be replicas of the previous vintage fleet, and an order for 14 such cars was placed in 2012. Rebuilding of the line then commenced, and was continuing in late 2014, at which time reopening was scheduled for 2015, in time for the 2016 Summer Olympics. In July 2015, limited service resumed between Carioca Station and Largo do Curvelo, and was extended from the latter point to Largo do Guimarães in December 2015, making the length of route in operation about 2 km (1.2 mi). Service on the Paula Mattos branch remained suspended indefinitely at that time.

The Francisco Muratori branch, which had been abandoned since 1966, reopened in 2016, but is served only by very limited service, with only trips per day as of 2019 and only a single trip per day as of 2024.

Work continued slowly, and at times intermittently, on restoration of additional sections of the main route to Dois Irmãos. In February 2018, just five trips per day were extended from Largo Guimarães to Praça Odylo, and then on 22 October 2018 all service was extended to Largo do França. The full 6-kilometre (4 mi) route between Largo da Carioca and Dois Irmãos was finally restored to operation and passenger service in January 2019. Work to reopen the Paula Mattos branch began in 2024, and service on the branch was restored in January 2025. The 2.9 km-long (1.8 mi) (5.8 km round trip) section of line between Dois Irmãos and Silvestre, which had been abandoned since 2008, reopened in June 2026. This extension will eventually allow interchange with the Corcovado Rack Railway, once the long-closed Silvestre station on that line has been reopened.

== Routes ==
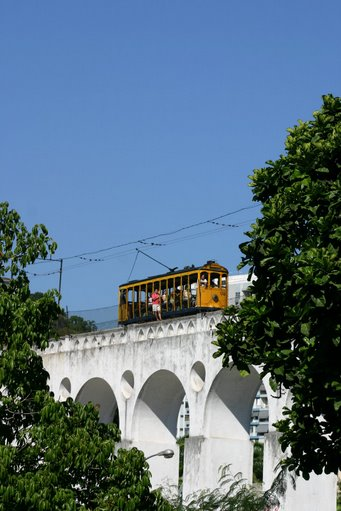
Santa Teresa tram over the aqueduct arches

The Santa Teresa tram route rises from downtown Rio de Janeiro and climbs Santa Teresa hill, offering a high-level view of the city. It passes over the 17.6-metre (58 ft) high Carioca Aqueduct, a former aqueduct constructed in 1750 and 1,435 mm (4 ft 8 1/2 in) standard gauge electric trams used to run beneath it. Except for the section between the central terminus and the initial station (including the aqueduct), the route is shared by motor vehicles.

Before 1964, Rio de Janeiro trams served the entire downtown area and all nearby suburbs, but, after 1967, only the Santa Teresa line remained. Before the system closed in 2011, trams ran from Carioca to Dois Irmãos via Largo dos Guimarães and along a short branch from the latter to Largo das Neves (Paula Mattos). There were also services between Carioca and Silvestre from 1999 to 2008. After reopening in 2015, services were gradually restored along the entire route, including the Paula Mattos branch and, to a limited degree, on the long-abandoned branch to Francisco Muratori.

=== Current service ===
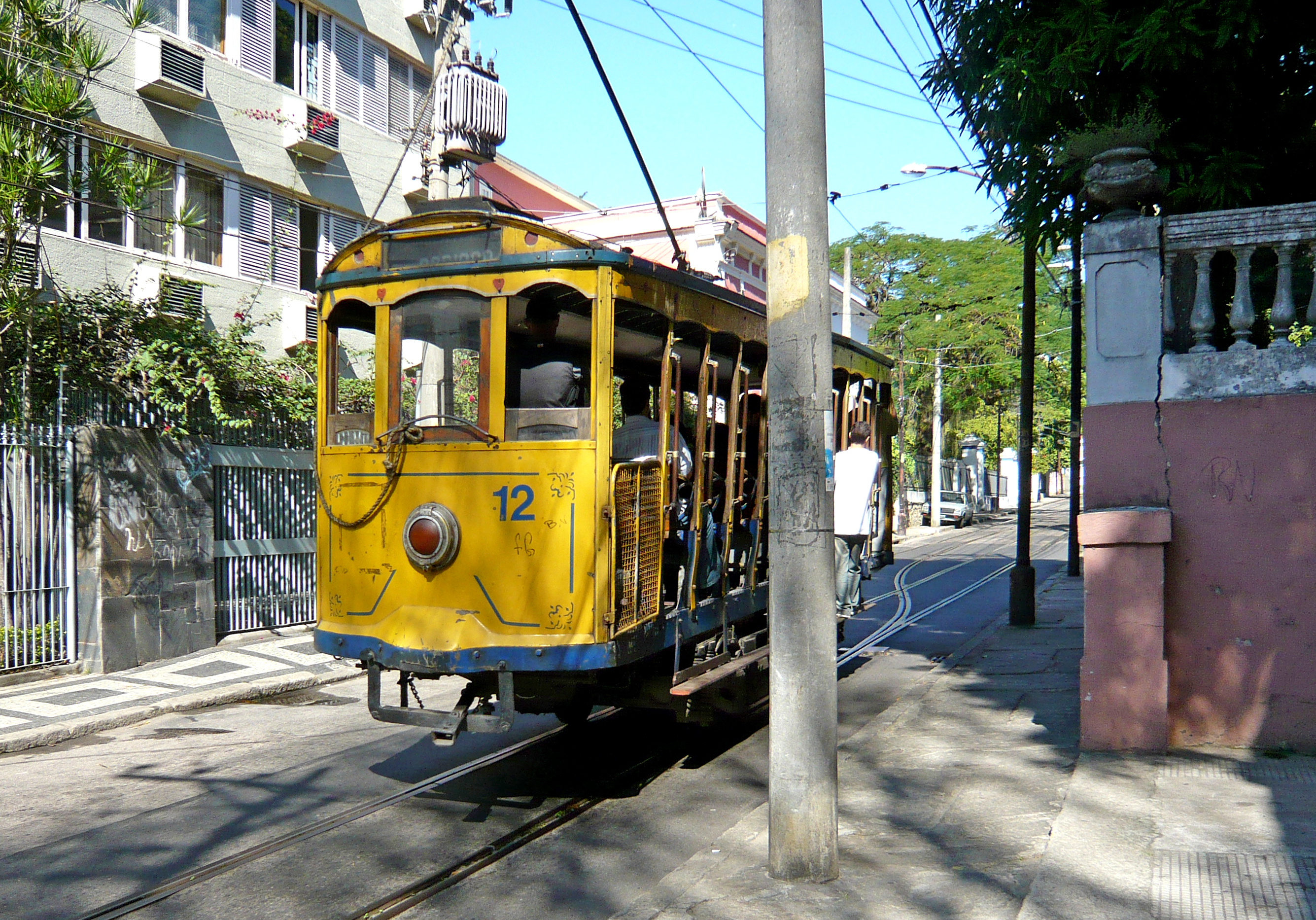
Car 12 on the Paula Mattos line in 2007, here leaving a section of bidirectional single-track

Most services run from near Largo da Carioca (in the city centre, at 22.910188°S 43.178732°W) to Largo do Guimarães (Santa Teresa cultural center, at 22.9215517°S 43.1860415°W), where the lines branch. The main route continues southwestwards to Dois Irmãos (at the intersection of Rua Almirante Alexandrino with Rua Gomes Lopes, at 22.935141°S 43.20109°W) and is 6.0 km (3.7 mi) long. Four trams per day continue 2.9 km (1.8 mi) (5.8 km round trip) from there to Silvestre (at 22.945516°S 43.204948°W) from 10:00 to 15:00. The other route runs northwest from Largo do Guimarães towards Largo das Neves (22.916279°S 43.191709°W). This terminus is indicated as Paula Mattos on the destination signs of the vintage tramcars, though the neighbourhood to which the name refers adopted the modernised spelling of Paula Matos many years ago. Its length – about two-thirds of which is shared with the Dois Irmãos route – is 3.7 km (2.3 mi). The four daily trips to Silvestre will eventually allow passengers to connect with the Corcovado Rack Railway there, but currently that line has no stop at Silvestre. A station there closed in 1966, and its reopening is planned, but has yet to come to fruition.

As of 2026, the service between Carioca and Dois Irmãos runs every 30 minutes from 08:00 to 18:30 on weekdays, and from 09:00 to 17:00 on weekends and public holidays. The Paula Mattos line runs every hour from 08:00 to 17:00 on weekdays and from 09:00 to 17:00 on weekends and public holidays.

==== Special service ====
Just one trip per day operates on a route between Carioca terminal and Rua Francisco Muratóri, via the Carioca Aqueduct. This route is 800 m (2,600 ft) long, of which 400 m (1,300 ft) is shared with the main line. The non-shared portion of track is bi-directional single-track. Having closed in 1966, the short branch was reopened in late 2015 and formally "inaugurated" in January 2016, but actual public service was not introduced until sometime later in 2016 and has been very limited and somewhat intermittent since then. In 2018 and 2019, there were two trips per day, departing Carioca at 08:00 and 15:00, but in 2024, the branch was being served by only a single round trip, at 08:30 each day.

== History ==
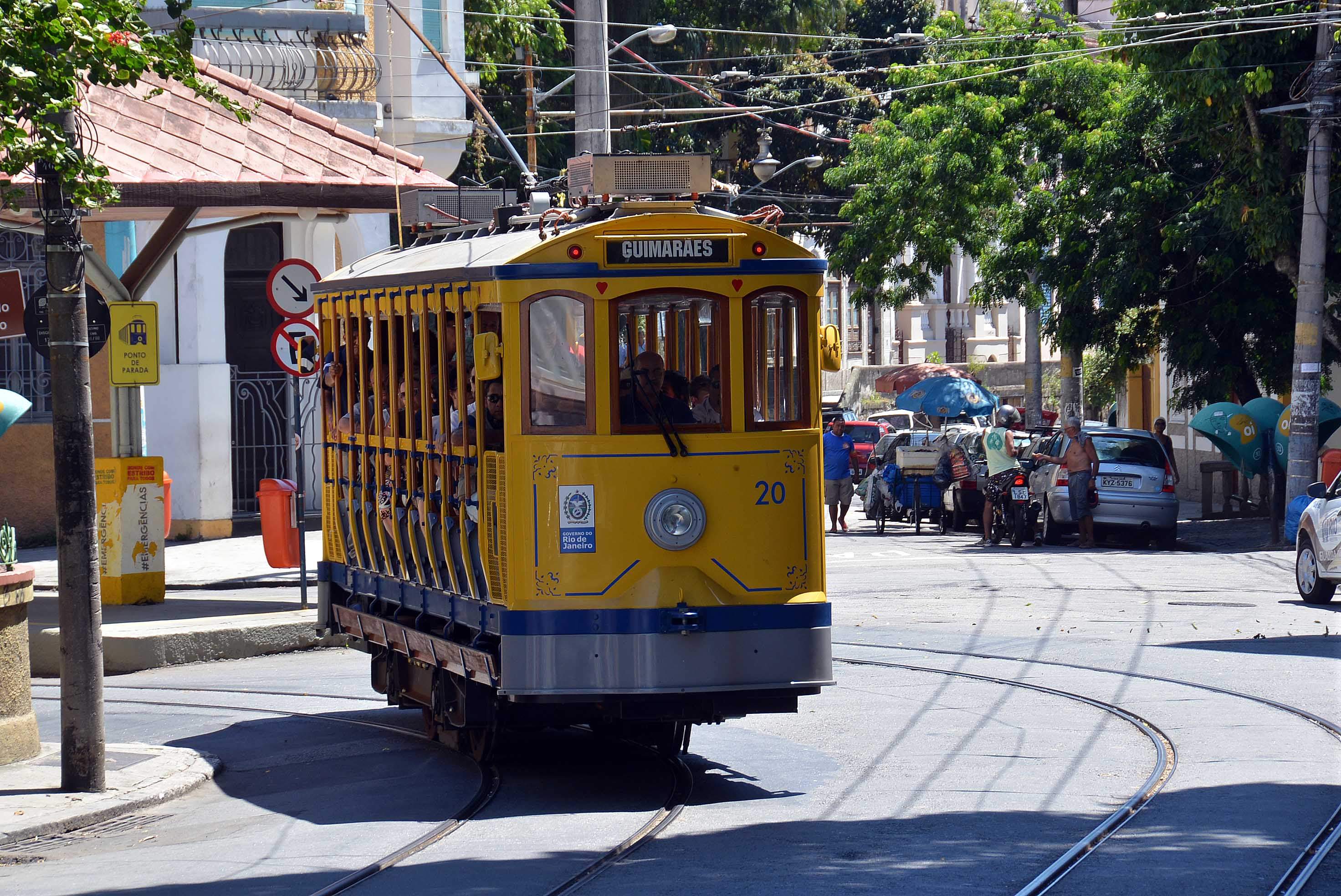
The tram in 2015

If horse-drawn tramways are included, trams have operated in Rio de Janeiro since 1859 – continuously, apart from an 1866–1868 suspension. There are only four cities in the world in which trams have run longer: New Orleans (since 1835), Boston (1856), Mexico City and Philadelphia (both 1858).

Rio de Janeiro's first tramway was a 7-kilometre (4.3 mi) horsecar line on which service was inaugurated on 30 January 1859 (testing began in 1858). Constructed by Thomas Cochrane and operated by the Companhia de Carris de Ferro da Cidade a Tijuca, the service ran between the city centre and Tijuca. In 1862 steam trams replaced the horsecars, making Tijuca line the first steam-powered tramway in South America, but the higher speed and poor condition of the track led to many derailments, and the line was closed in November 1866. It was reopened in January 1870, by a different company.

A new horse-drawn tramway was built in 1868 by Charles B. Greenough and a service running from Rua do Ouvidor to Largo do Machado commenced on 9 October, extended to Botafogo six weeks later. By January 1871, the line had reached the Rio de Janeiro Botanical Garden, 10 km from the city centre.

Another tramway using horse-drawn vehicles, constructed by Albert H. Hager and run by the Rio de Janeiro Street Railway, opened on 25 November 1869. The first route ran to the palace grounds at Quinta da Boa Vista, with routes to Caju and São Cristóvão following later.

In 1870 the Rio de Janeiro Street Railway (soon to be renamed the Companhia de São Cristóvão) reopened the route of Cochrane's pioneer tramway to Tijuca. A new horse-drawn tram, constructed by João Batista Viana Drummond and run by the Companhia Ferro-Carril da Vila Isabel, opened in 1873. Further routes were opened to the Vila Isabel zoo, Engenho Novo, Méier and the suburbs along the Dom Pedro II Railroad on the northwest side of town. The Ferro-Carril de Jacarepaguá company opened a new line in 1875, running from the Dom Pedro II Railroad's Cascadura station to Taquara and Freguesia.

In name only, the Santa Teresa tramway's first horse-drawn line, operated by Empreza de Carris de Ferro de Santa Theresa, opened in the same year of 1875, but served only the flat terrain within the city centre, not actually serving any of the Santa Teresa neighbourhood (or any part of the line that survives today); it was 820 mm (2.69 ft) gauge. The same company built both a funicular (513 m long) to take passengers from the city centre up to Santa Teresa hill and a separate hilltop tram line which started at the top of the funicular. The hilltop Santa Teresa tramway, the predecessor of the current line, opened on 13 March 1877, with a gauge of 914 mm (3.0 ft). It ran from the funicular station east to Curvelo and west to Largo do França. This main Santa Teresa line was extended from Largo do França to Silvestre in 1890. The operating company's name changed in 1885 and again in 1891, but kept the name Companhia Ferro-Carril Carioca from 1891 until the beginning of 1964.

Meanwhile, steam trams were reintroduced to Rio in 1882, this time on the Tijuca line, operated by the São Cristóvão tramway company.

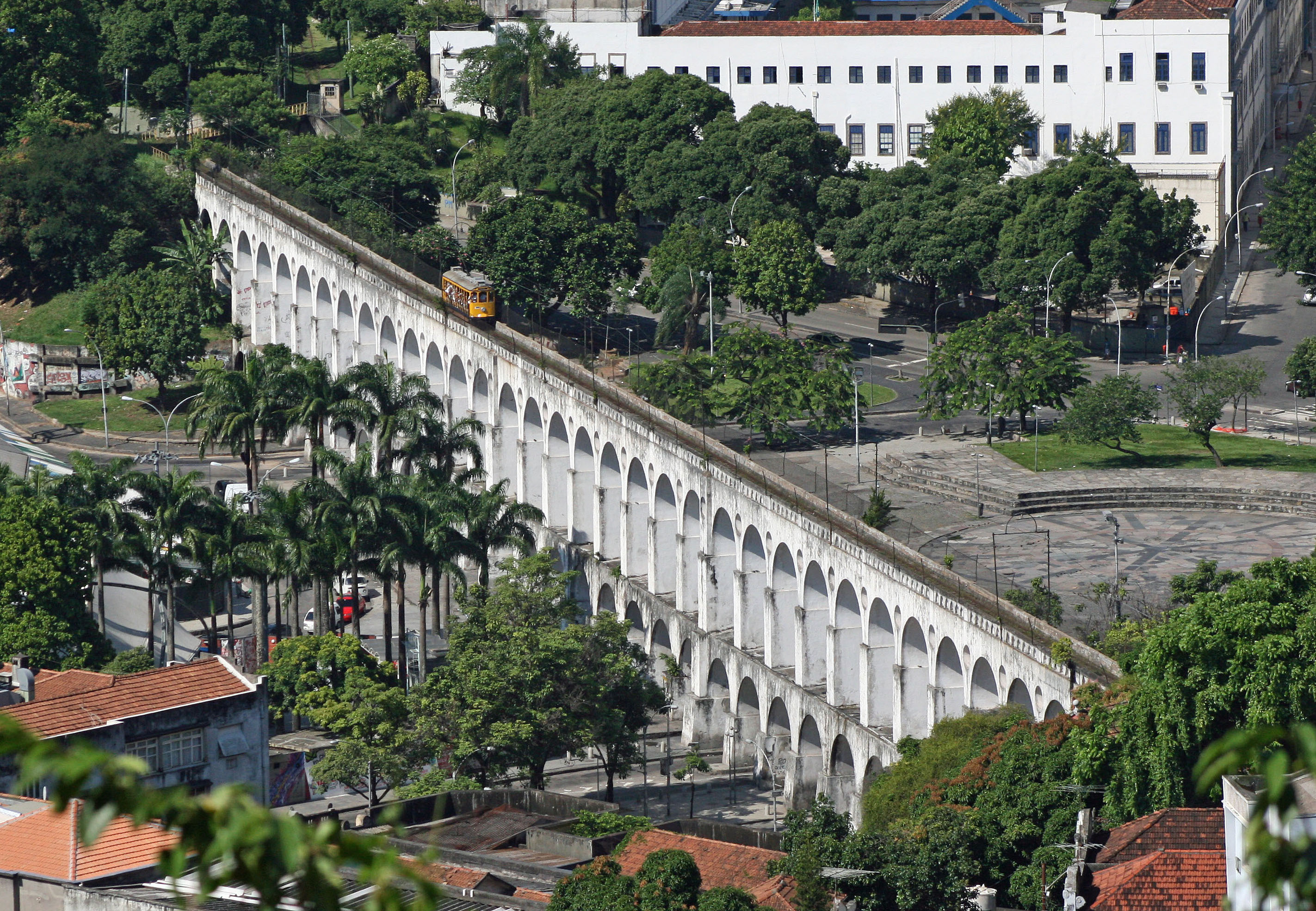
A tram on the Carioca Aqueduct in 2010, viewed from the Chácara do Céu Museum

1892 saw the arrival of the first electric tram, on the Botanical Garden route. This was the first electrified street railway in all of Latin America, aside from a tram line that was extended in 1890 from Laredo, Texas, into Nuevo Laredo, Mexico (barely onto Latin American soil). It was quickly followed by other electric tram lines in Rio, including a Rua do Catete service in 1894 and two new lines in Flamengo in 1896.

In 1896 electric trams replaced the horsecars on the Santa Teresa line, and the line was extended across the then-abandoned aqueduct between Santa Teresa and Santo Antonio hills (the Carioca Aqueduct), with the city terminus uniquely being built on the second floor of the company's office building on Largo da Carioca. During this rebuilding, the line's gauge was changed from 914 mm (3 ft) to 1,100 mm (3 ft 7 5/16 in), which it retains to the present day. The Santa Teresa system's electrification was completed in 1897.

By 1897 the Carioca railway had been completely electrified, making it the first totally electric tram system in South America. Electrification expanded rapidly over the next few decades and by 1928 the last horse-drawn trams had been withdrawn from service.

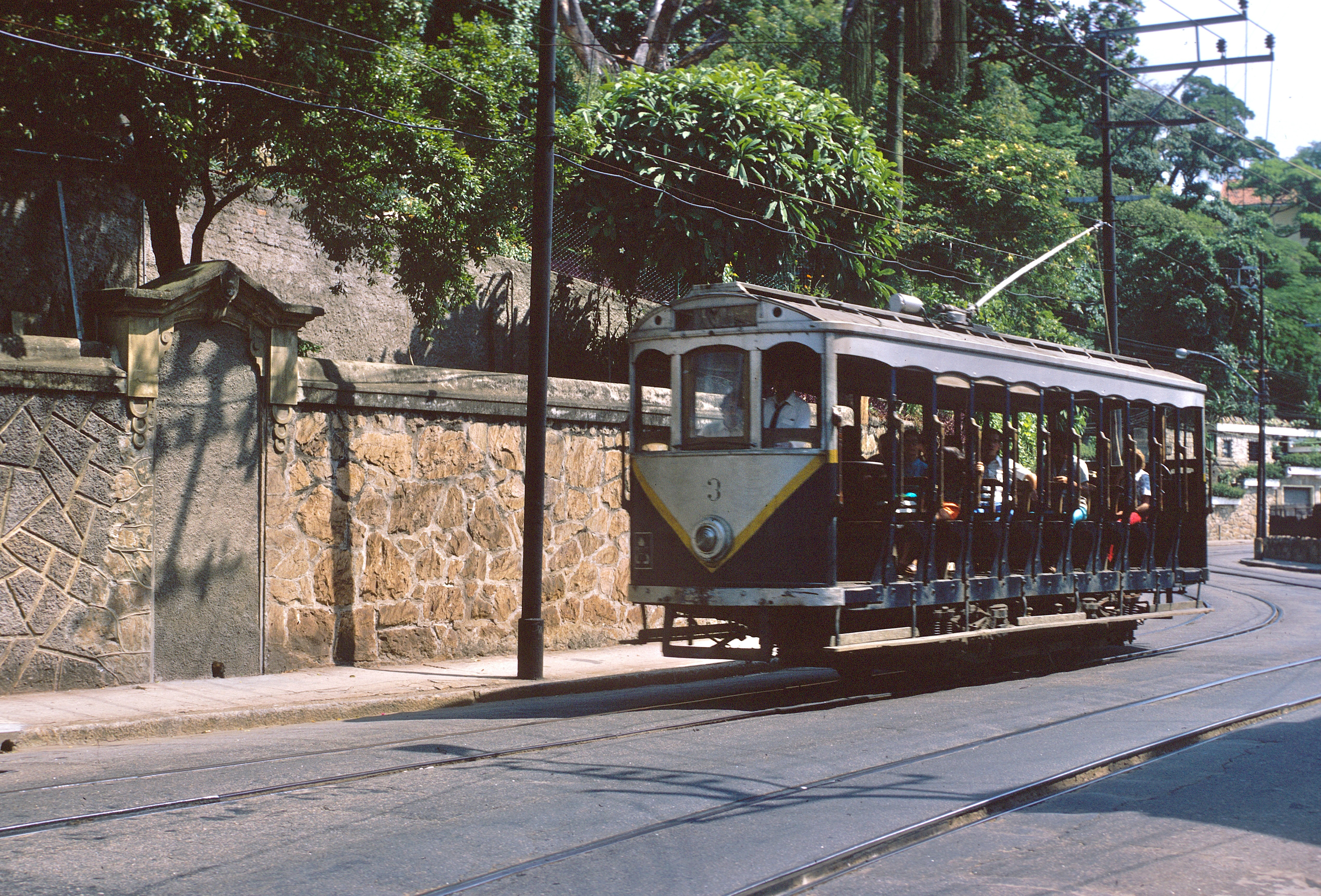
From 1964 to 1973, most trams wore a blue-and-silver livery.

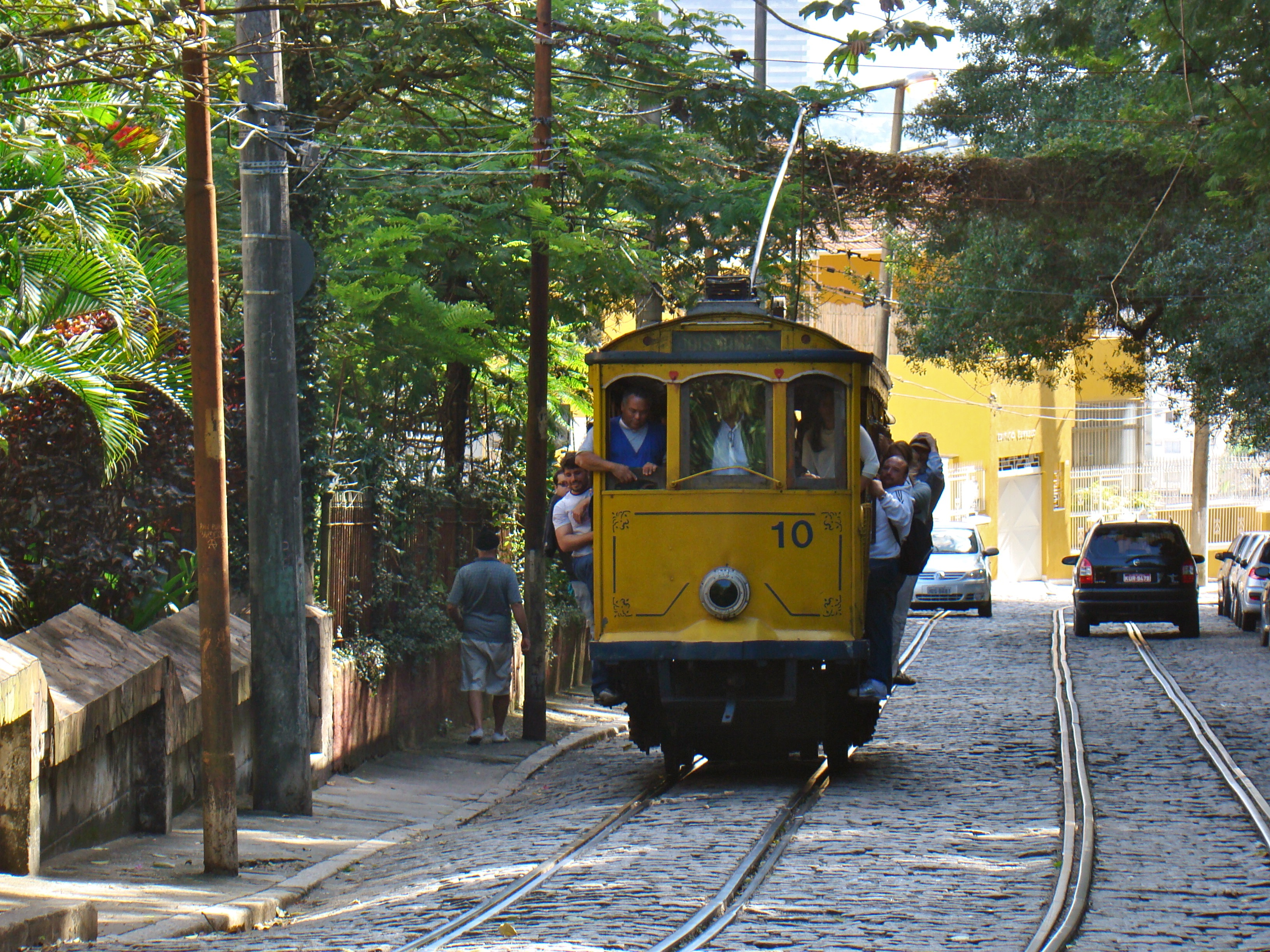
Tram on cobblestone-paved section of Rua Joaquim Murtinho in 2009

From around the 1950s, the Rio de Janeiro tram system went into decline, with many lines being closed, and by the end of the decade most of the tram routes of the former São Cristóvão system had gone.

Closures continued through the 1960s, with the closure of the Alto da Boa Vista route in 1967, leaving only the Santa Teresa tram still running. The Silvestre Line had been cut back to Dois Irmãos in 1966; the section beyond was abandoned following storm damage.

The Santa Teresa tram moved to its new modern terminal in 1975, in the gardens of the Petrobrás oil company, located on the roof of the company's parking garage. This was the Santa Teresa line's sixth successive city-centre terminus; it remains the system's terminal today. The system is currently operated by the Companhia Estadual de Engenharia de Transportes e Logística.

Starting in December 1999 a few trips on the main (Dois Irmãos) route, on Saturdays only, had continued beyond Dois Irmãos, to Estação Silvestre (22.945629°S 43.204911°W), a route section previously closed in 1966. However, operation of these trips became sporadic and is thought to have ceased by 2005 or 2006; the section of tramway between Dois Irmãos and Silvestre was closed definitively in 2008, after the theft of most of the overhead trolley wire. Plans to reopen the line were announced in 2023, work began in 2024, and limited service was restored in June 2026.

=== Depots and terminals ===
During the heyday of the Rio de Janeiro tram system, there were a number of depots (carhouses) and terminals.

Depots at Cascadura, Penha, Méier, Alto da Boa Vista, Usina, Triagem, 28 de Setembro, Vila Isabel, São Cristóvão, Bonjardim, Rua Larga, Santo Antonio (neighbourhood), Largo do Machado, Largo dos Leoes and Cosme Velho are all now closed, and the only depot still operating is Santa Teresa itself.

Most termini are also now closed, including Freguesia (Jacarepaguá), Taquara, Madureira, Irajá, Cavalcante, Inahauma, Caxambi, Piedade, Quintino Bocaiuva, Caju, Andarai, Santa Alexandrina, Estrela, Praia Vermelha, Leme, Gávea and Silvestre. Lastly, three termini are still served, near Largo da Carioca, at Dois Irmãos and Largo de Neves, and of these Largo da Carioca is the only one with a terminal building.

One historic mule tram depot, at Vila Guarani, is preserved.

== Problems ==
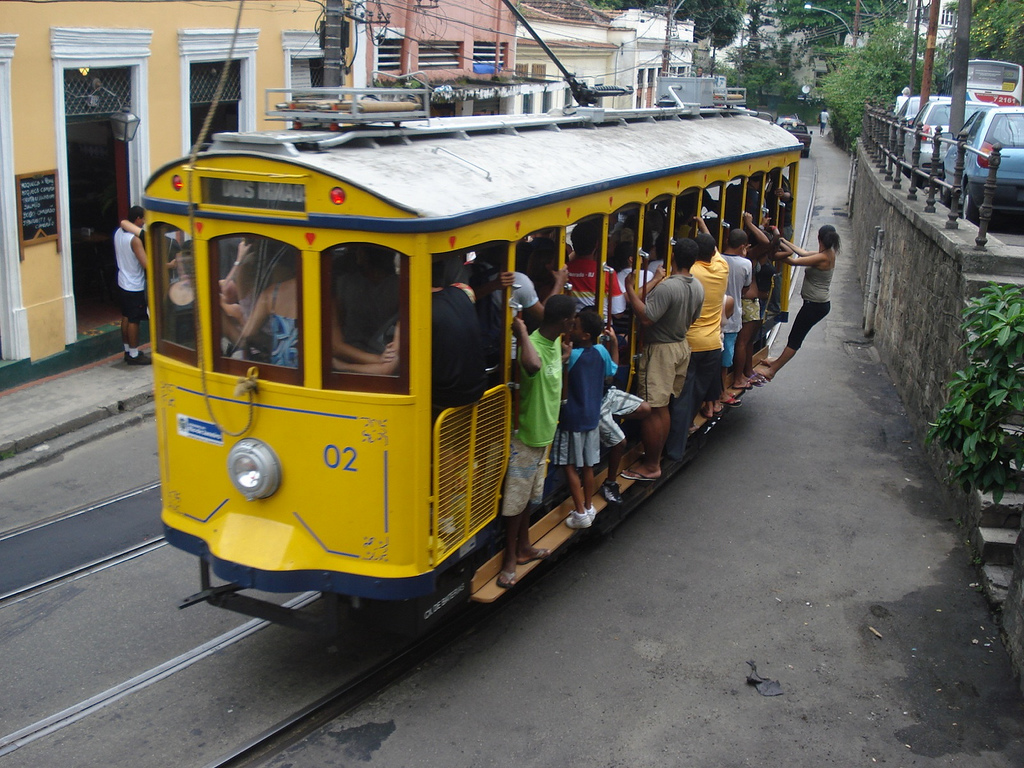
Rio de Janeiro's trams are often overcrowded, but the longstanding practice of allowing passengers to stand on the running boards, seen in this 2009 photo, has now been banned.

Prior to the 2011 suspension, the tram's fleet was outdated, with only five cars remaining in use on a regular basis, which were 50–60 years old. The cars were open-sided with wooden cross-benches, leading to street children often hopping on and off for free rides. Electricity to the cars is provided through roof-mounted trolley poles, and all cars are bi-directional. The old cars were built locally by the tramway companies, but several key components were supplied by foreign manufacturers: traction motors from English Electric, controllers from General Electric and trucks by the Peckham Manufacturing Company (Kingston, New York). They were built in the 1950s, but in appearance were similar to the cars that the line had used since the 1890s.

By the 2000s, the cars and tracks were not in good repair, so the ride was slow and bumpy, though the carriages were regularly repainted in keeping with the tram's heritage image. The ride is good for sightseeing, but besides tourists, there are few regular paying passengers and so the tramway was increasingly running at a loss. The new replica trams, which began to arrive in 2014, have new safety features, but retain the appearance of the old cars, for heritage-preservation value and tourist appeal. They are bi-directional, open-sided cars, using trolley poles to collect current.

== Suspension and renovation ==
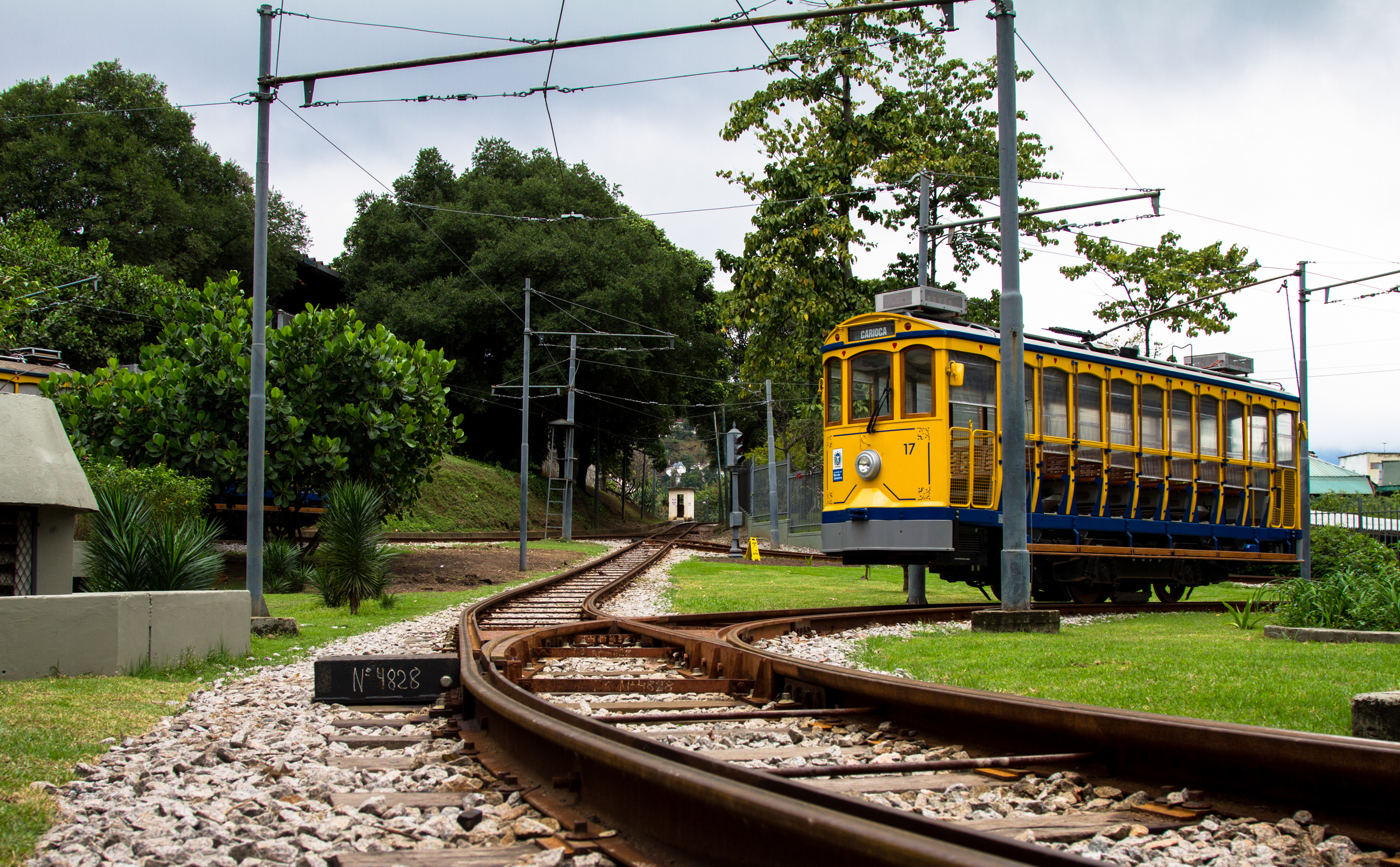
One of the new trams, which are replicas of the old ones, in the Carioca terminal loop in 2015

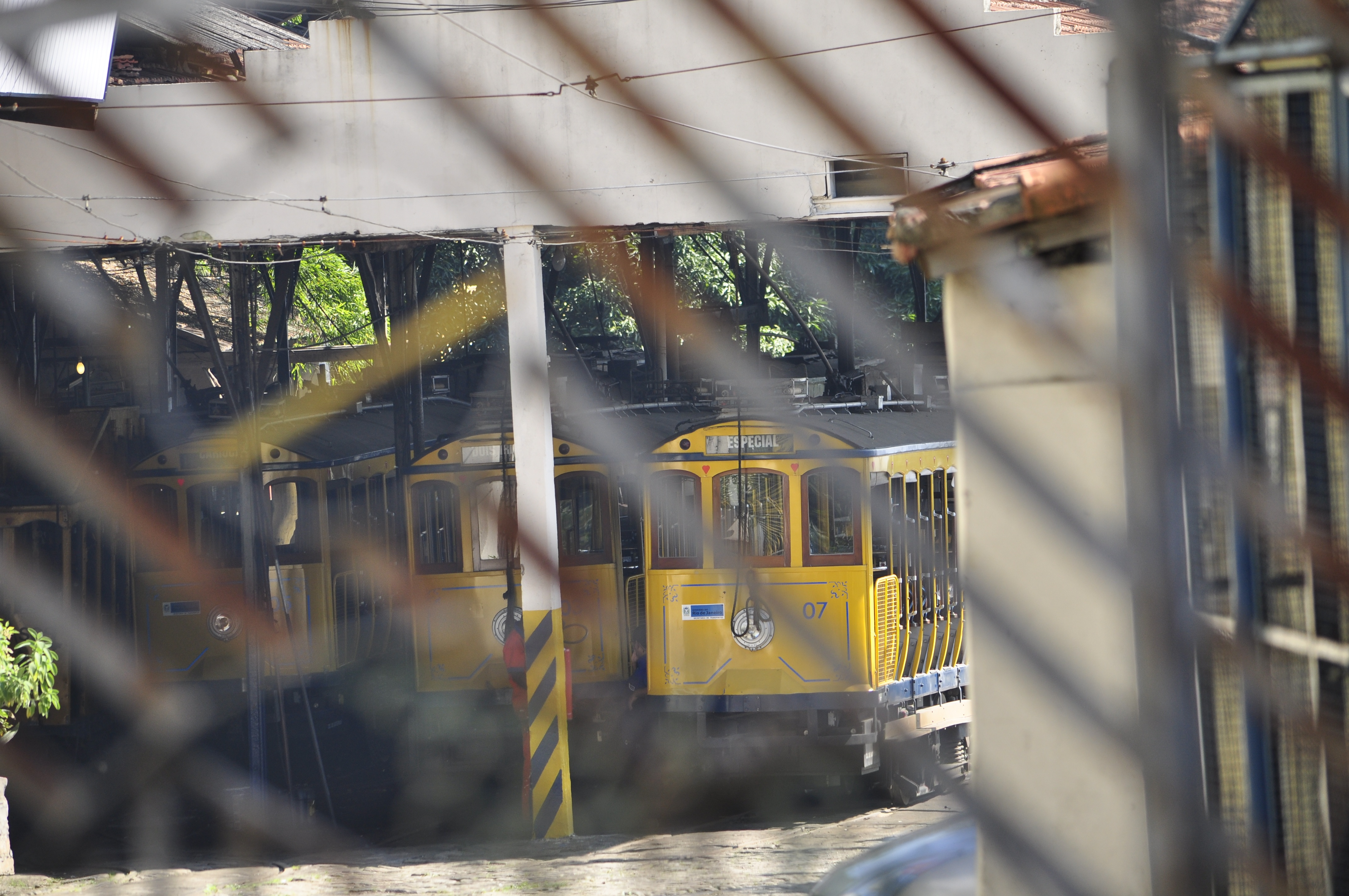
In the mid-2010s, the old trams were still in storage in the depot, which remained out of use at that time.

Six people were killed and at least 50 injured when a tram derailed in late August 2011. All service was suspended indefinitely after the accident.

The year 2012 saw the start of a R$110m project for the procurement of new rolling stock and the renovation of the tram line. An order for 14 new two-axle trams was placed in 2012 with a Brazilian manufacturer named T'Trans (based in Três Rios). Delivery was originally projected to begin in November 2013, but was delayed, and the first car was not delivered until August 2014. Reopening of the line was planned to take place in stages, starting with the section between Largo da Carioca and Largo do Curvelo. In May 2014, this was predicted to occur in August 2014, but was delayed. By 1 October 2014, only one new tramcar had been delivered, and it was making test runs. By the end of 2014, five of the new trams had been delivered, numbered 16–20.

After additional delays, the first segment finally reopened on 27 July 2015, with very limited service initially, covering only the 1.7-kilometre (1.1 mi) section from Carioca terminus to Largo do Curvelo and running only between 11:00 a.m. and 4:00 p.m., every 20 minutes, Monday to Saturday. Service was extended from Largo do Curvelo to Largo do Guimarães on 28 December 2015, but without any expansion to the limited hours of operation. During the 2016 Summer Olympics, the hours of operation were temporarily expanded, to 8:00 a.m. to 4:00 p.m., and the frequency was doubled, to every 10 minutes. By that time, mid-2016, additional delays had caused the estimated date of restoration of service over the full line to Dois Irmãos to be postponed to at least December 2017.

Service was finally restored through to Dois Irmãos in January 2019, in stages. In February 2018, a limited-service extension – served by only five trips per day – from Largo Guimarães to Praça Odylo came into operation, and on 22 October 2018 all service was extended to Largo do França. The final stage was reached on 21 January 2019, making the route once again Largo da Carioca to Dois Irmãos, a length of 6 kilometres (4 mi).

Of the order for 14 new replica-vintage tramcars that was placed with T'Trans in 2012, only eight cars had been delivered by mid-2019, numbered 16–23. As of 2015, the old trams were in storage at the depot (carhouse), their fate undecided.

== Murals ==
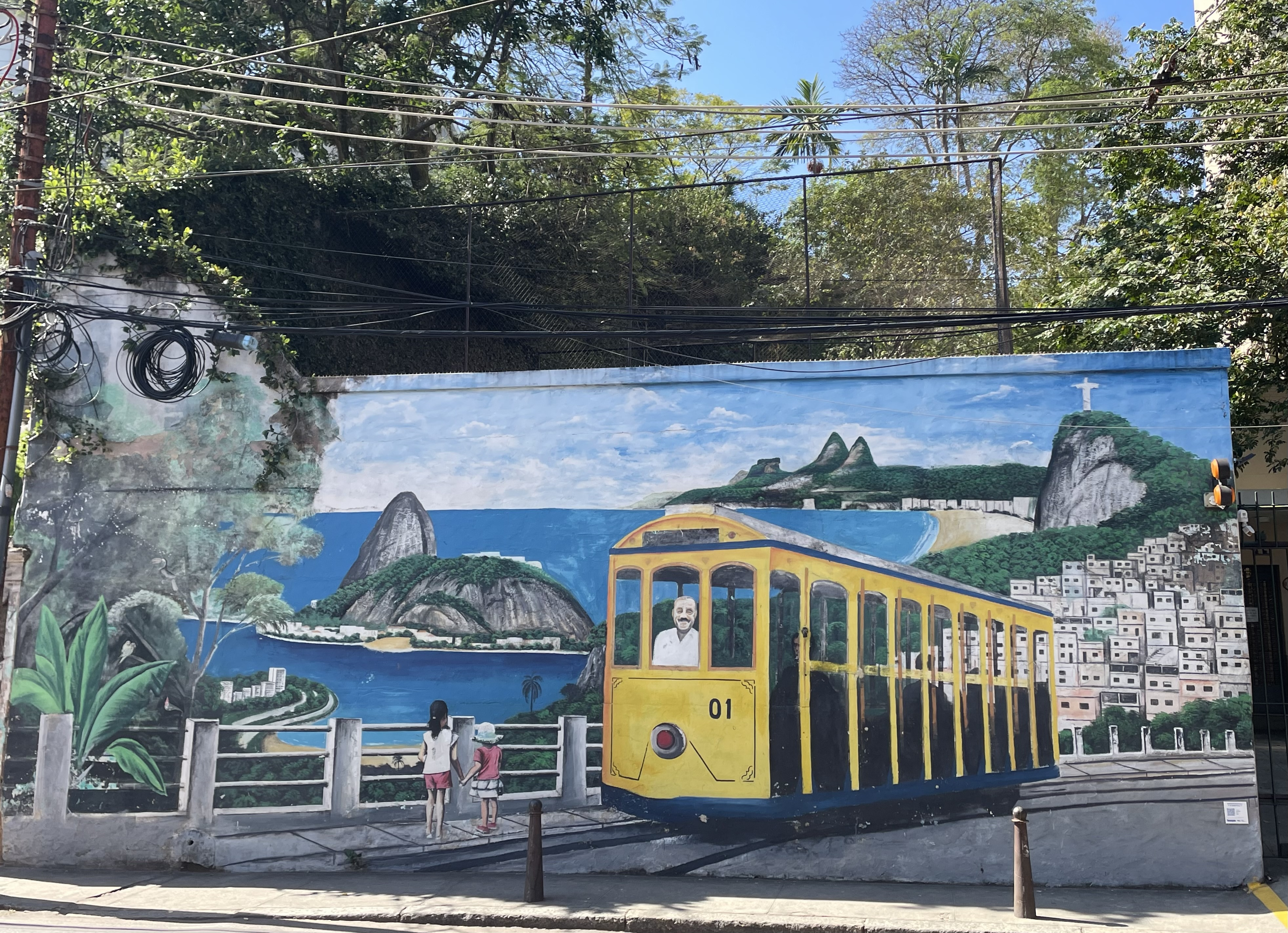
Mural of the Santa Teresa tram

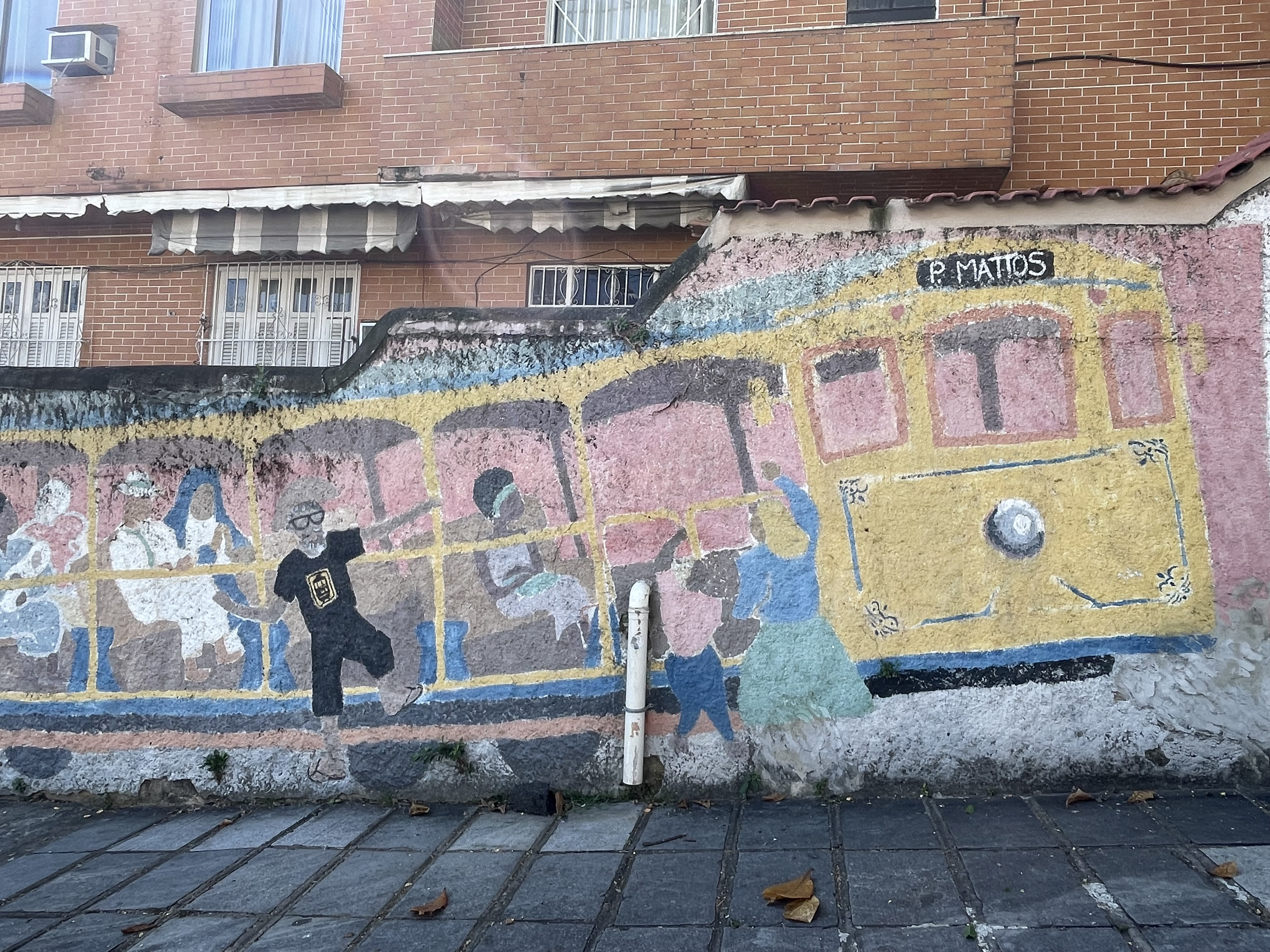
Older mural of the Santa Teresa tram

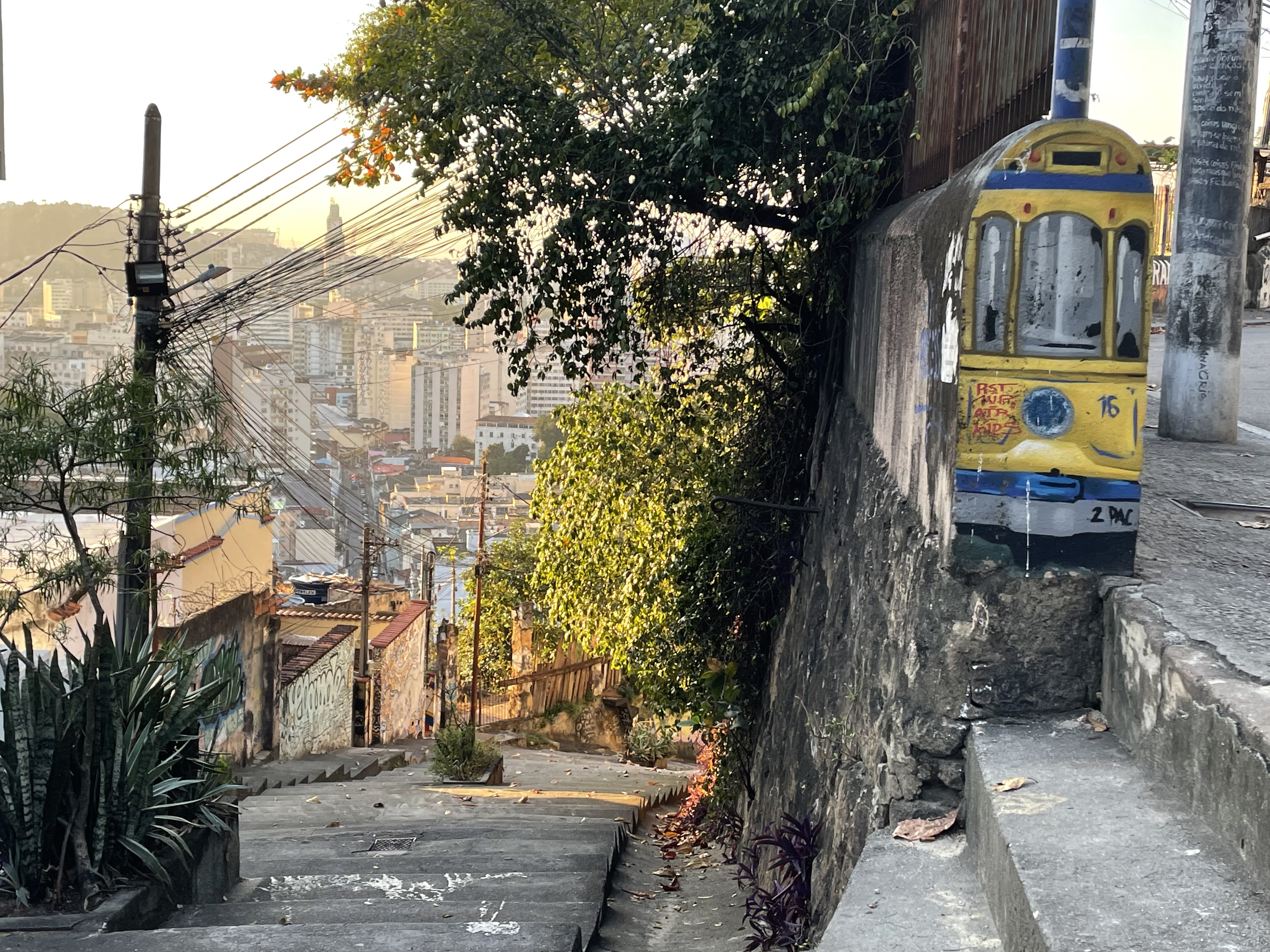
Local street featuring tram artwork

== See also ==
- List of town tramway systems in Brazil
- Rio de Janeiro Metro
- Supervia - Rio de Janeiro suburban railway
