= Santa Teresa, Rio de Janeiro =

Santa Teresa
- Neighborhood
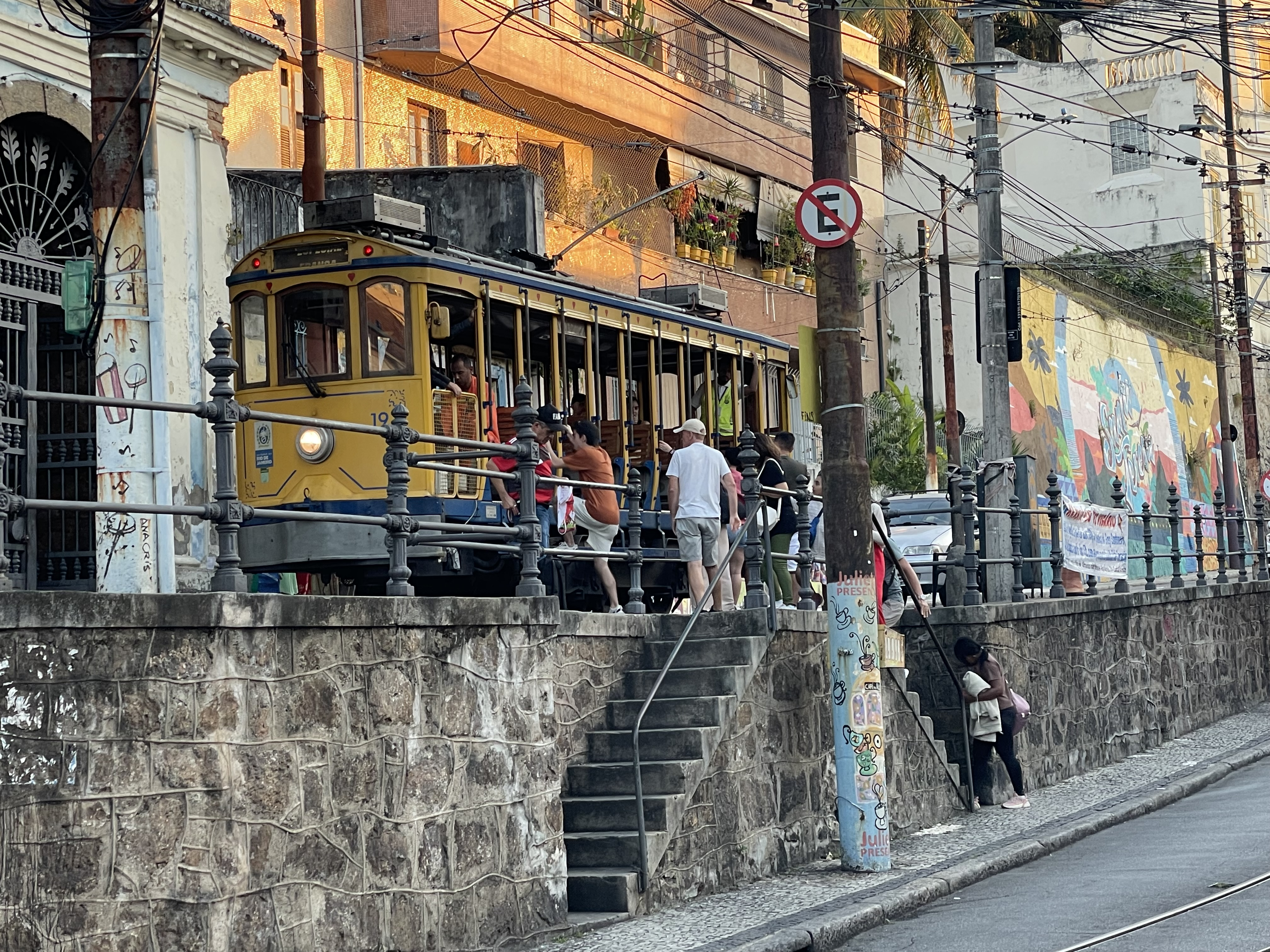
- Santa Teresa tram stop

- Location in Rio de Janeiro
- Coordinates: 22°55′03″S 43°11′17″W
- Country: Brazil
- State: Rio de Janeiro (RJ)
- Municipality/City: Rio de Janeiro
- Zone: Centro

Population (2022)
  - Total: 35,873

Santa Teresa (Portuguese pronunciation: [ˈsɐ̃tɐ teˈɾezɐ]) is a neighborhood in the city of Rio de Janeiro, Brazil. It is located on top of the Santa Teresa hill, by the centre of Rio, and is famous for its winding, narrow streets which are a favourite spot for artists and tourists.

The neighborhood originated around the Santa Teresa Convent, built in the 1750s on the Desterro hill. At the end of the 19th and early 20th century it was an upper class borough, as testified by its many opulent villas. Santa Teresa ceased being an upper-class neighbourhood long ago, but it has been revived as a fashionable hotspot. It is home to several artists and art studios and galleries. The offer of restaurants and bars is also varied.

One of Santa Teresa's most illustrious inhabitants was Raymundo Ottoni de Castro Maia, an art collector who lived in his Chácara do Céu mansion in the neighborhood. The estate was turned into a museum (Museu da Chácara do Céu) and its exhibits include works by Matisse, Jean Metzinger, Eliseu Visconti, Di Cavalcanti, and Candido Portinari. It is located near the adjacent to the cultural center Glória Maria Municipal Park. In 2006, some paintings were stolen, and have not yet been recovered.

Another museum is the Museu do Bonde, which tells the history of the famous Santa Teresa Tram since its historic origins. A ride on the tram is a popular attraction among tourists. It sports crossing the old Carioca Aqueduct, going through picturesque streets of the Santa Teresa neighbourhood and wonderful views of the city downhill.

== History ==
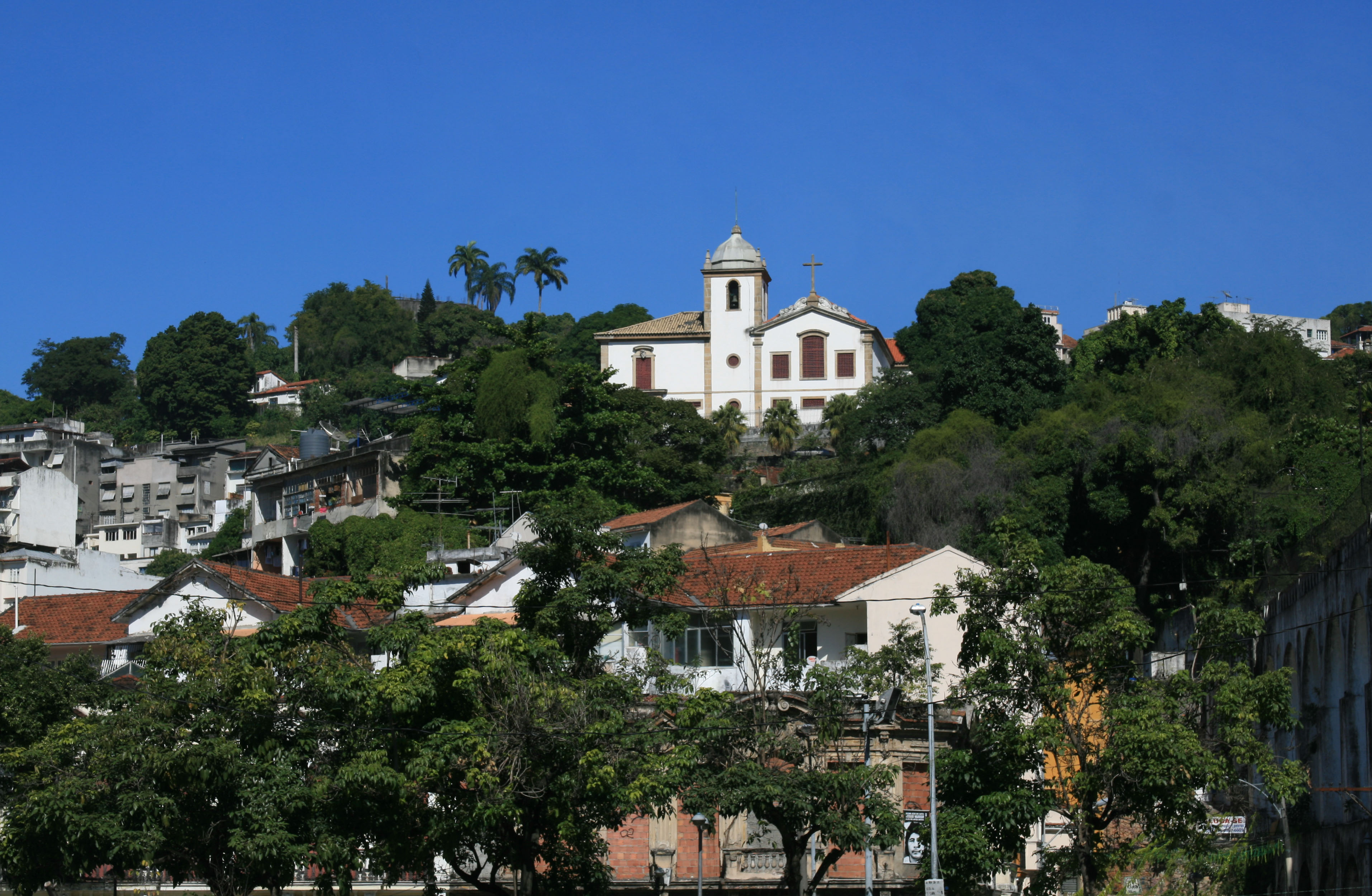
Convent of Santa Teresa

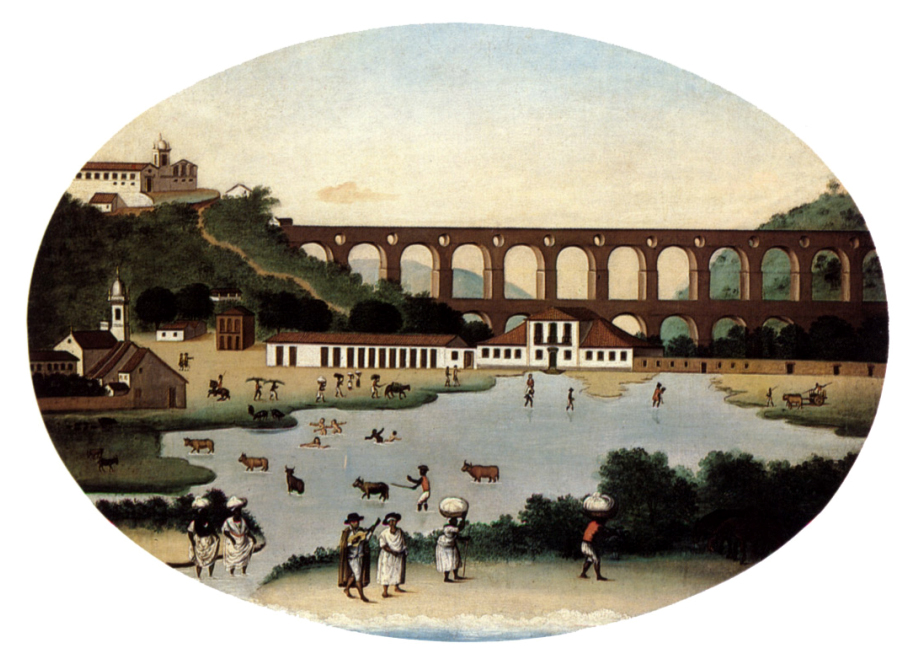
View of the Convent of Santa Tereza (on the hill, to the right) in a 1790 painting. The pond in front was filled for the construction of the Passeio Público.

=== Santa Teresa Convent ===
The neighborhood arose in the 1750s on the Morro Desterro ("Right Hill"), emerging from the eponymous Catholic convent. It was one of Rio de Janeiro's first expansions out of the initial Portuguese settlement in the city center. Initially inhabited by the upper class of the time, several houses and mansions were built, inspired by French architecture of the time, many of which are standing today. All throughout its history, Santa Teresa received many European immigrants.

Around 1850 many people, fleeing the yellow fever epidemic in the city, flocked to the neighborhood. As it was at a higher altitude, Santa Teresa was less affected by the epidemic than the surrounding neighborhoods.

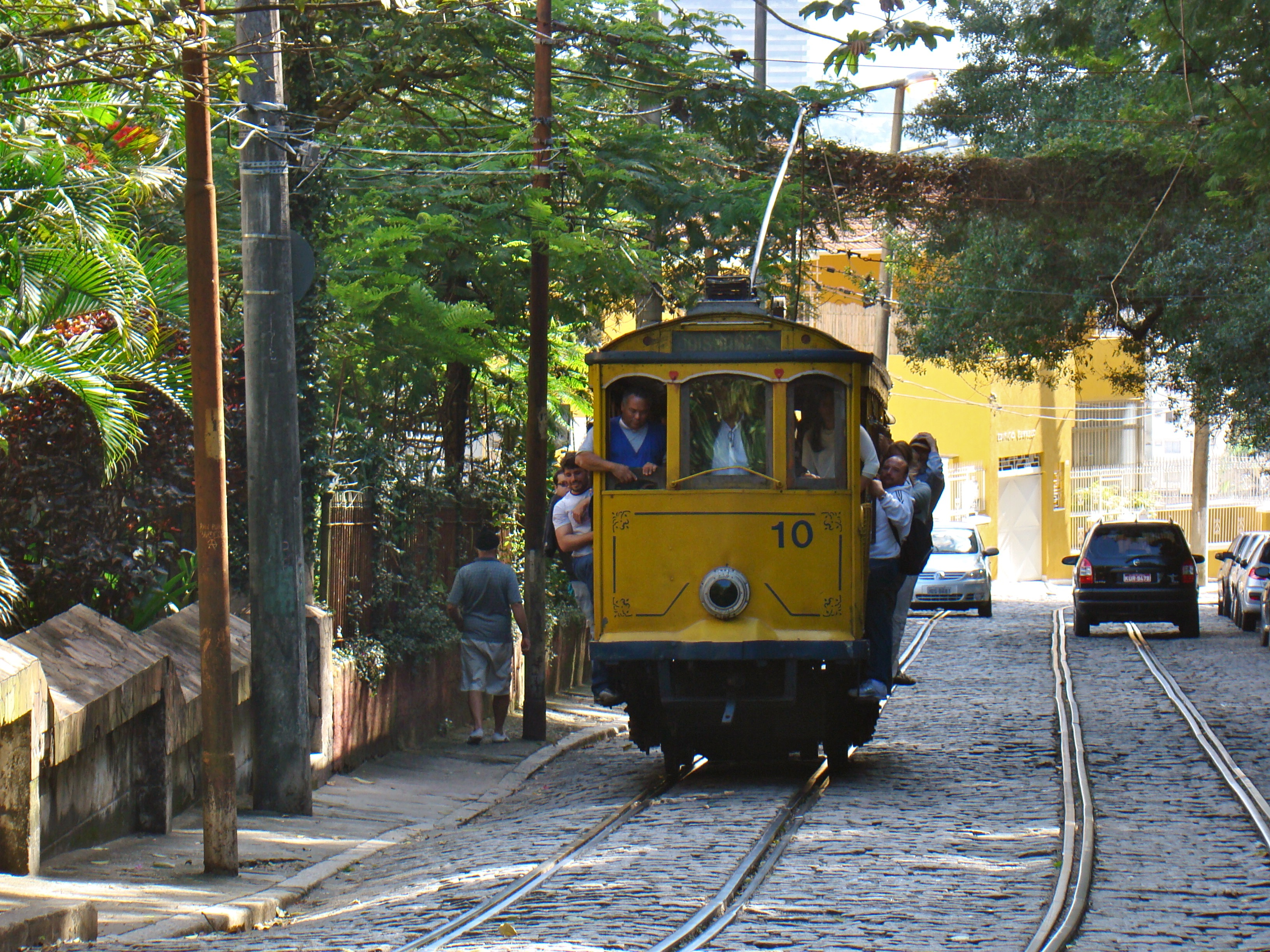
The Santa Teresa Tram has run over the Carioca Aqueduct since 1896.

=== Santa Teresa tram ===
In 1872, a tram line was constructed to connect Santa Teresa to downtown Rio de Janeiro, which further advanced the access to the neighborhood. The tram ran up the streets of Rua Joaquim Murtinho (named after Joaquim Murtinho) and Rua Almirante Alexandrino, crossing the Carioca Aqueduct. Initially, the tramcars were drawn by mules, before electric tramcars replaced the mule- or horse-drawn trams in 1896. The tramcars' colours ranged from green to silver and blue, but came to be painted bright yellow after complaints from residents who said that the tram "disappeared" amid the greenery of the neighborhood. The iconic yellow trams – or bondes in Brazilian Portuguese – have become a symbol of Santa Teresa.

By means of organized demonstrations, residents were able to preserve the historic tram system by convincing the government to release funds for the streetcars. After an accident with a tram in 2011 that killed five people, all service on the tram line was suspended for four years, in order to modernize the system. Newly built, replica-vintage tramcars in the same style as the old fleet were acquired, and the line was rebuilt and reopened in stages starting in 2015. It was restored to its full length of 6 km (4 mi) in January 2019.

=== Revitalization ===
Over time, Santa Teresa lost its status as an upscale neighborhood, like many of the historic districts of Rio's South zone. In recent years however, it has become a district of cultural interest because of its architectural value and prime location. In 2009 the city council started a gentrification program to revitalize the neighborhood. Walls were built to stop the surrounding favelas from growing; and taxes were imposed on water, energy and gas supply in order to decrease the number of poor people.

== Culture ==
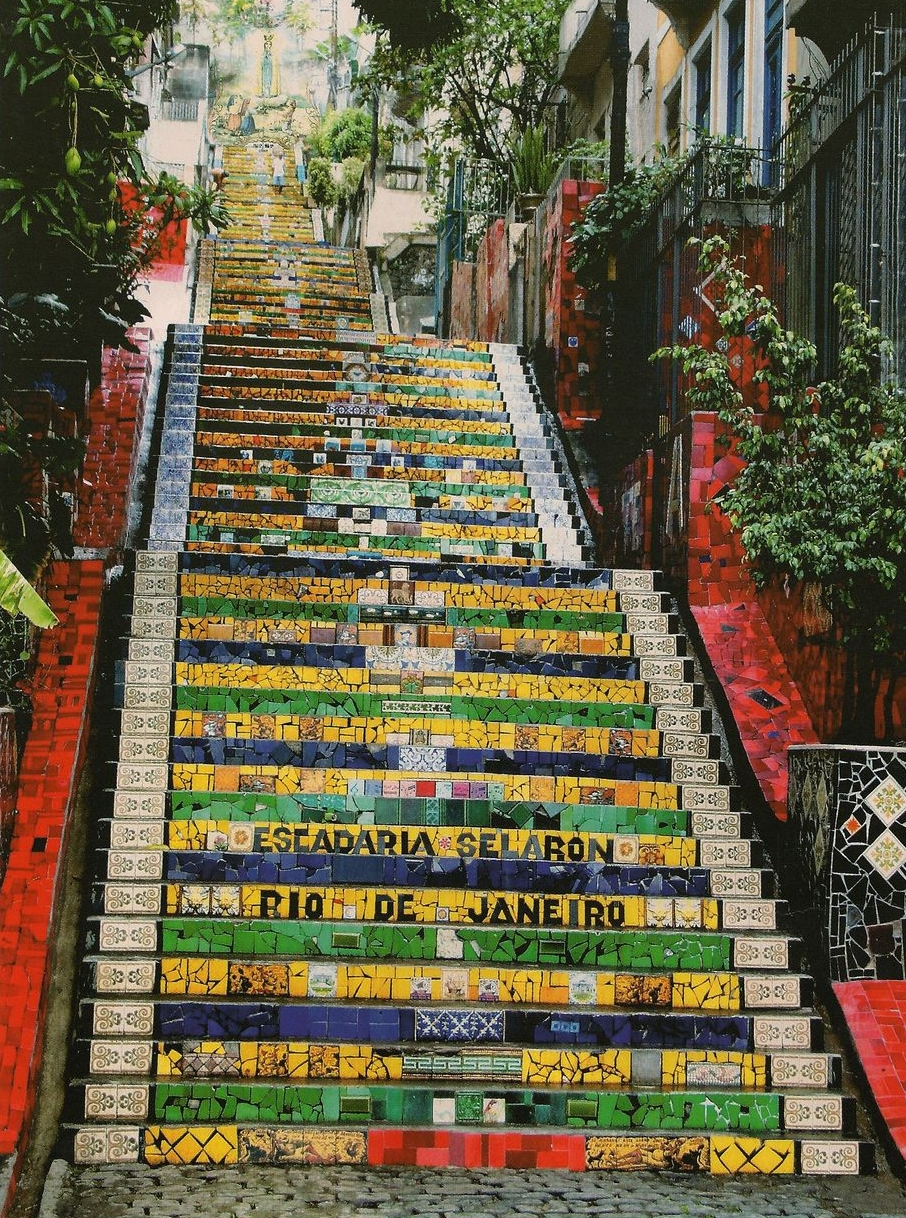
The Selarón stairs.

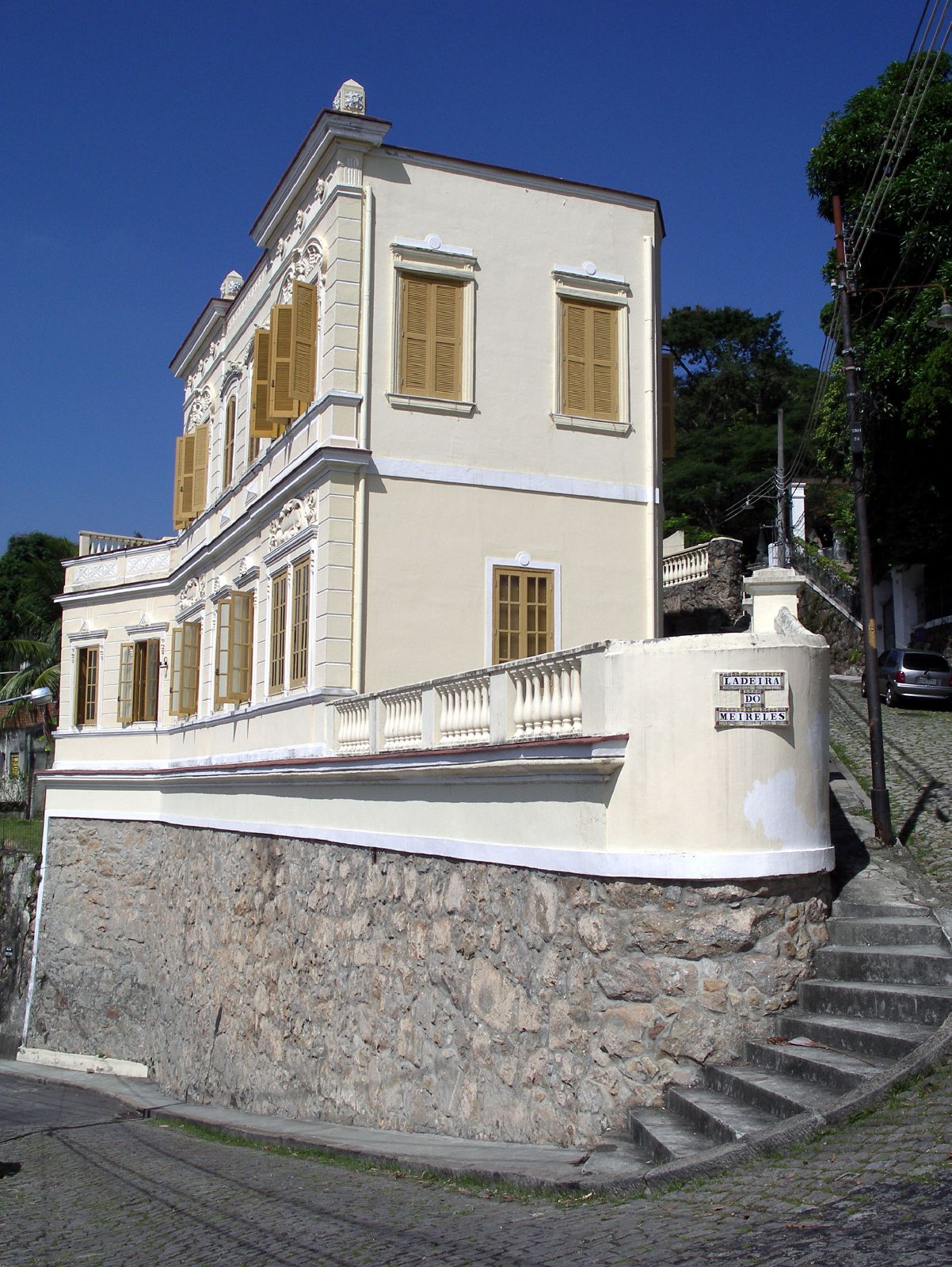
Picturesque corner of Ladeira de Meireles

Traditionally Santa Teresa is a renowned gathering place for intellectuals, academics, artists and politicians, who are attracted by its historic character, cultural life and standard of living. Due to this profile, it is a former district of opinion with political participation in popular movements. There are also a large number of NGOs who provide services and support to the favelas located around Santa Teresa.

Santa Teresa has a varied gastronomic scene, particularly around Largo do Guimarães, and is also known for its artistic community and studios. Its concentration of artists and galleries has led to comparisons with Paris's Montmartre. The neighborhood's bohemian atmosphere, historic architecture, and cultural offerings have made it a popular destination for visitors to Rio de Janeiro. In 2016, it was included in a ranking that recognized it as one of the world's most unique neighborhoods.

The neighborhood, affectionately called "Santa" by locals, is composed of several steep staircases, slopes, cobbled roads and tortuous alleys, which provide the character of the neighborhood. These sloping roads connect Santa Teresa to the surrounding districts of Centro, Glória, Laranjeiras, Fátima, Cosme Velho, Catumbi, Catete and Rio Comprido. At the highest point of Santa Teresa, which gives access to Tijuca National Park and Corcovado, there is a broad panoramic view of the city.

== Education ==
The Associação Civil de Divulgação Cultural e Educacional Japonesa do Rio de Janeiro ("Civil Association of Japanese Educational and Cultural Dissemination of Rio de Janeiro", known in Japanese as the "Rio de Janeiro Japanese School"), a Japanese international day school, was previously located in Santa Teresa. It is now located in Cosme Velho.

== Principal roads ==
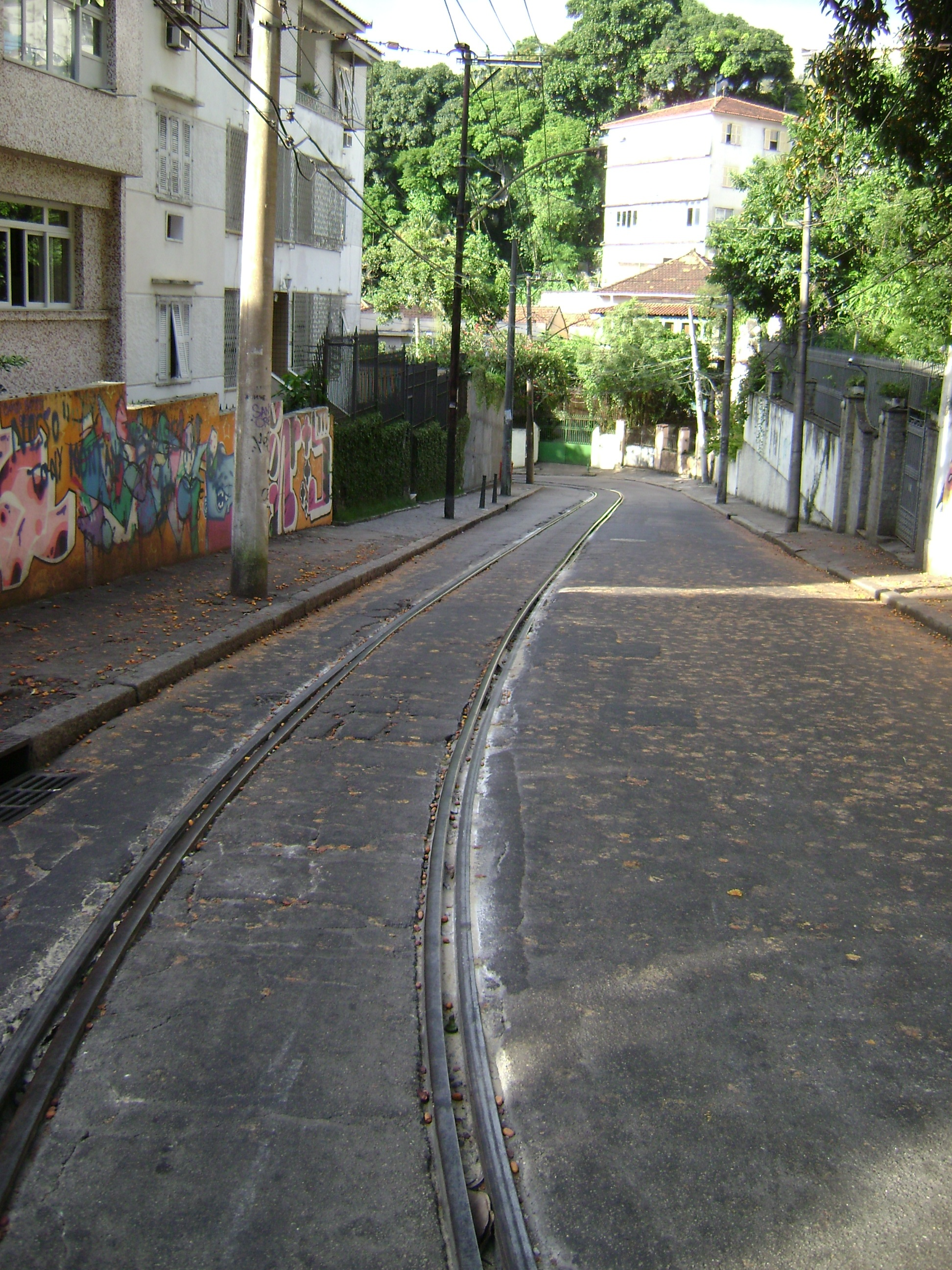
Rua Paschoal Carlos Magno

- Escadaria do Convento de Santa Teresa
- Escadaria do Fialho
- Escadaria Manoel Lebrão
- Escadaria Santa Isabel
- Ladeira do Castro
- Ladeira dos Guararapes
- Ladeira do Durão
- Rua Aarão Reis
- Rua Alice
- Rua Almirante Alexandrino
- Rua André Cavalcanti
- Rua Aprazível
- Rua Monte Alegre
- Rua Cândido Mendes, antiga Rua Dona Luíza.
- Rua Francisco Muratóri
- Rua Hermenegildo de Barros
- Rua Joaquim Murtinho
- Rua Júlio Otoni
- Rua do Oriente
- Rua Paula Mattos
- Rua Prefeito João Felipe
- Rua Santa Cristina
- Rua Santo Amaro
- Rua Cardeal Dom Sebastião Leme

== Panorama ==
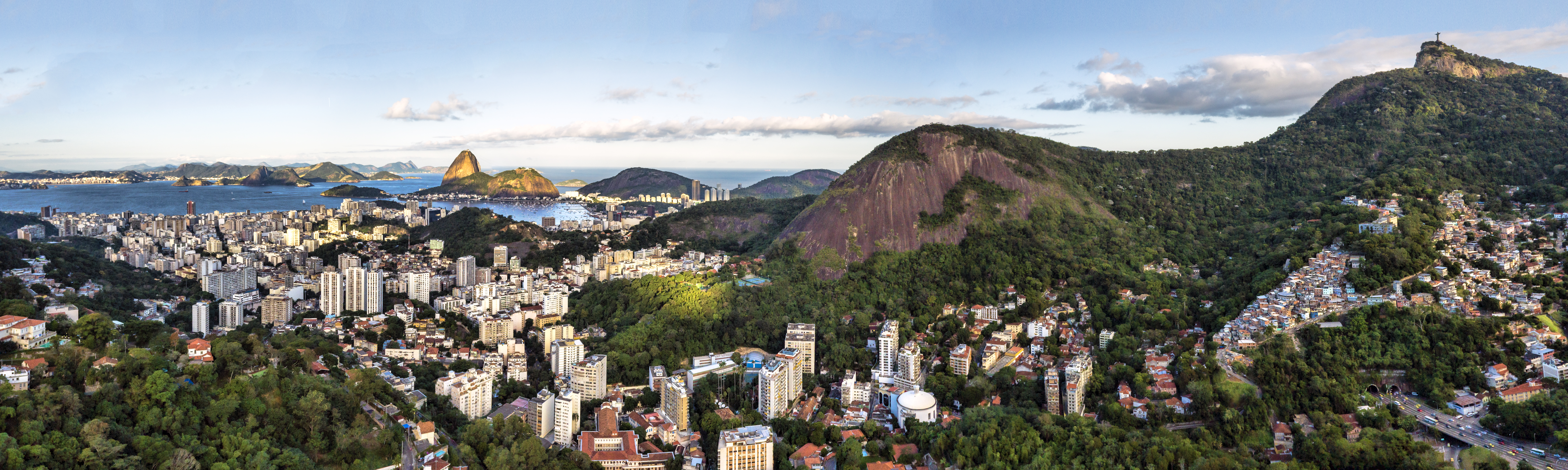
Aerial panorama from Santa Teresa: Botafogo neighborhood left, Sugarloaf Mountain in the back and Christ the Redeemer on top of Corcovado in the top right corner.
