= Silvestre, Rio de Janeiro =

Region of Rio de Janeiro, Brazil

Coordinates: 22°56′35″S 43°12′14″W

Silvestre is a region of Rio de Janeiro, but not officially recognized as a neighborhood.
