= Aqueduct (bridge) =

Structure constructed to convey water

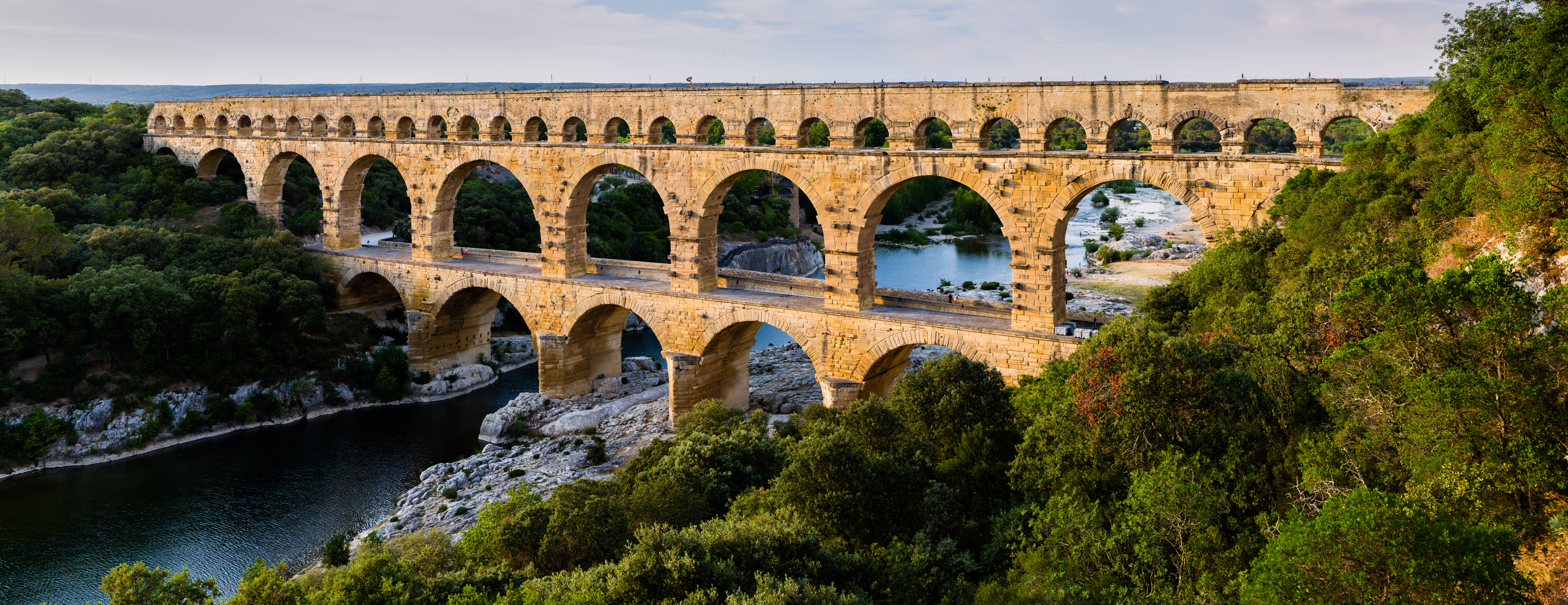
Pont du Gard, France, a Roman aqueduct built circa 40–60 CE. It is one of France's top tourist attractions and a World Heritage Site.

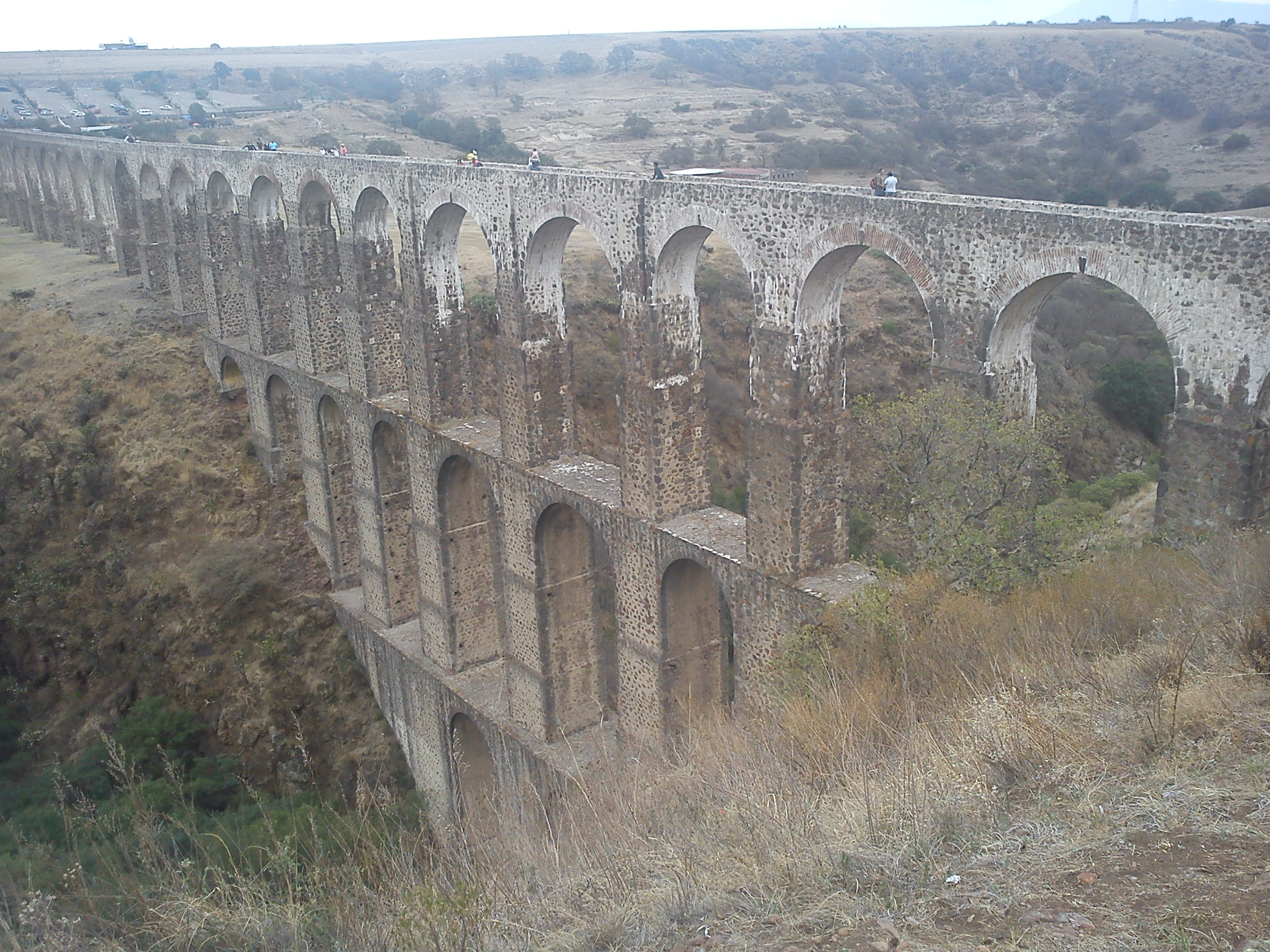
Aqueduct of Xalpa, Tepotzotlán, State of Mexico

Aqueducts are bridges constructed to convey watercourses across gaps such as valleys or ravines. The term aqueduct may also be used to refer to the entire watercourse, as well as the bridge. Large navigable aqueducts are used as transport links for boats or ships. Aqueducts must span a crossing at the same level as the watercourses on each end. The word is derived from Latin aquaeductus from aqua ("water") and ducere ("to lead"), therefore meaning "water-leader". A modern version of an aqueduct is a pipeline bridge. They may take the form of tunnels, networks of surface channels and canals, covered clay pipes or monumental bridges.

== Ancient bridges for water ==
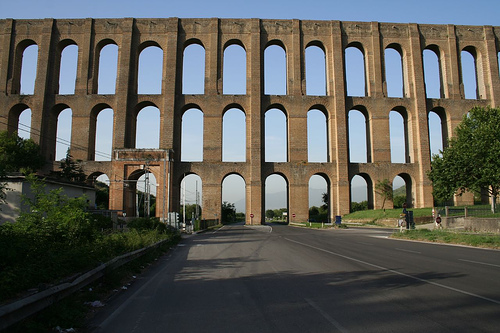
Aqueduct of Vanvitelli, Italy, built by Luigi Vanvitelli. It is a World Heritage Site.

Although particularly associated with the Romans, aqueducts were likely first used by the Minoans around 2000 BCE. The Minoans had developed what was then an extremely advanced irrigation system, including several aqueducts.

In the seventh century BCE, the Assyrians built an 80 km long limestone aqueduct, which included a 10 m high section to cross a 300 m wide valley, to carry water to their capital city, Nineveh.

=== Roman Empire ===
Bridges were a distinctive feature of Roman aqueducts, which were built in all parts of the Roman Empire, from Germany to Africa, and especially in the city of Rome, where they supplied water to public baths and for drinking. Roman aqueducts set a standard of engineering that was not surpassed for more than a thousand years.

== Modern aqueducts ==
=== Navigable aqueducts ===
Navigable aqueducts, also called water bridges, are water-filled bridges to allow vessels on a waterway to cross ravines or valleys. During the Industrial Revolution of the 18th century, navigable aqueducts were constructed as part of the boom in canal-building. A notable revolving aqueduct has been made on the Bridgewater Canal. This allowed vessels to cross at high and low levels while conserving water that would be lost in the operation of locks.

== Notable aqueducts ==
=== Roman aqueducts ===
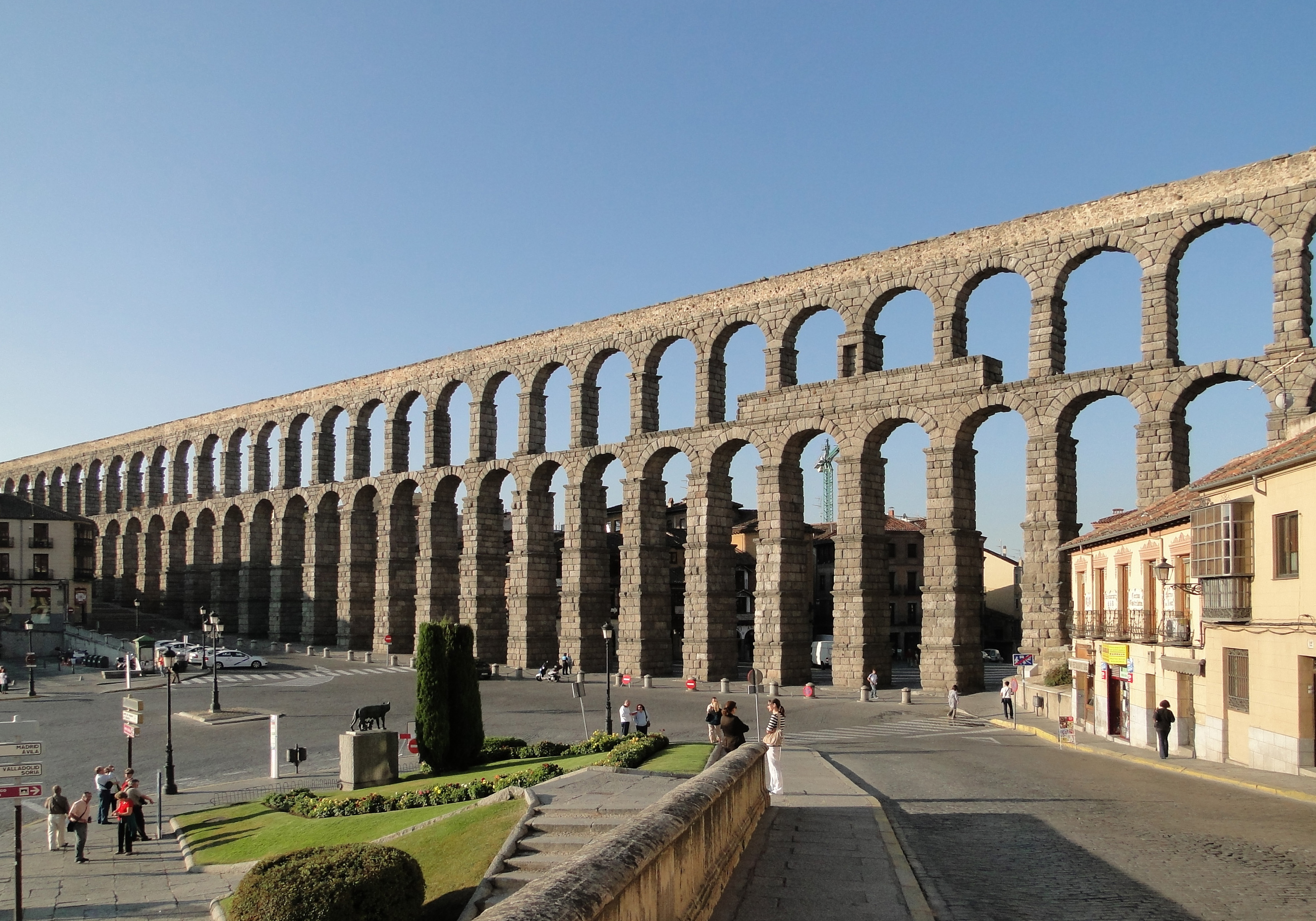
Aqueduct of Segovia

- The Pont du Gard in southern France
- Barbegal aqueduct, France
- Aqueduto de São Sebastião, in Coimbra, Portugal
- Eifel aqueduct, Germany
- Caesarea Maritima, Israel
- Patras, Greece
- Aqueduct of Segovia, Spain
- Acueducto de los Milagros, Mérida, Spain
- Tarragona, Spain
- Almuñécar, Spain (five aqueducts – four still in use)
- Valens Aqueduct, Istanbul, Turkey
- Aqua Augusta, Italy
- Aqua Claudia and the Anio Novus, as part of the Porta Maggiore, Rome, Italy
- Skopje Aqueduct, Skopje, North Macedonia

=== Other aqueducts ===
France

- Aqueduct St-Clément, Montpellier, France – 17th century
- Roquefavour Aqueduct, France – built between 1842 and 1847

Greece

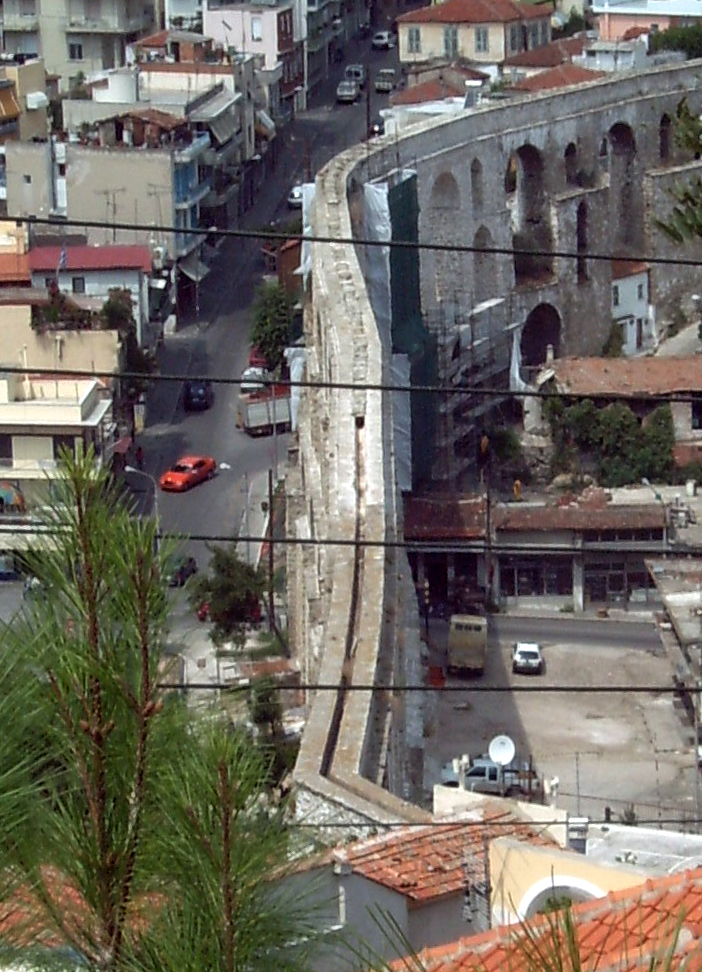
Kavala aqueduct, Greece

- Kavala aqueduct, 16th-century Ottoman aqueduct in Kavala, Greece

Malta

- Wignacourt Aqueduct, Malta; built in the 17th century to transport water from Dingli and Rabat to the new capital city Valletta; today, most of its arches still survive in the localities of Attard, Balzan, Birkirkara, Fleur-de-Lys and Santa Venera

Montenegro

- Bar Aqueduct, Montenegro – 16th century

Portugal

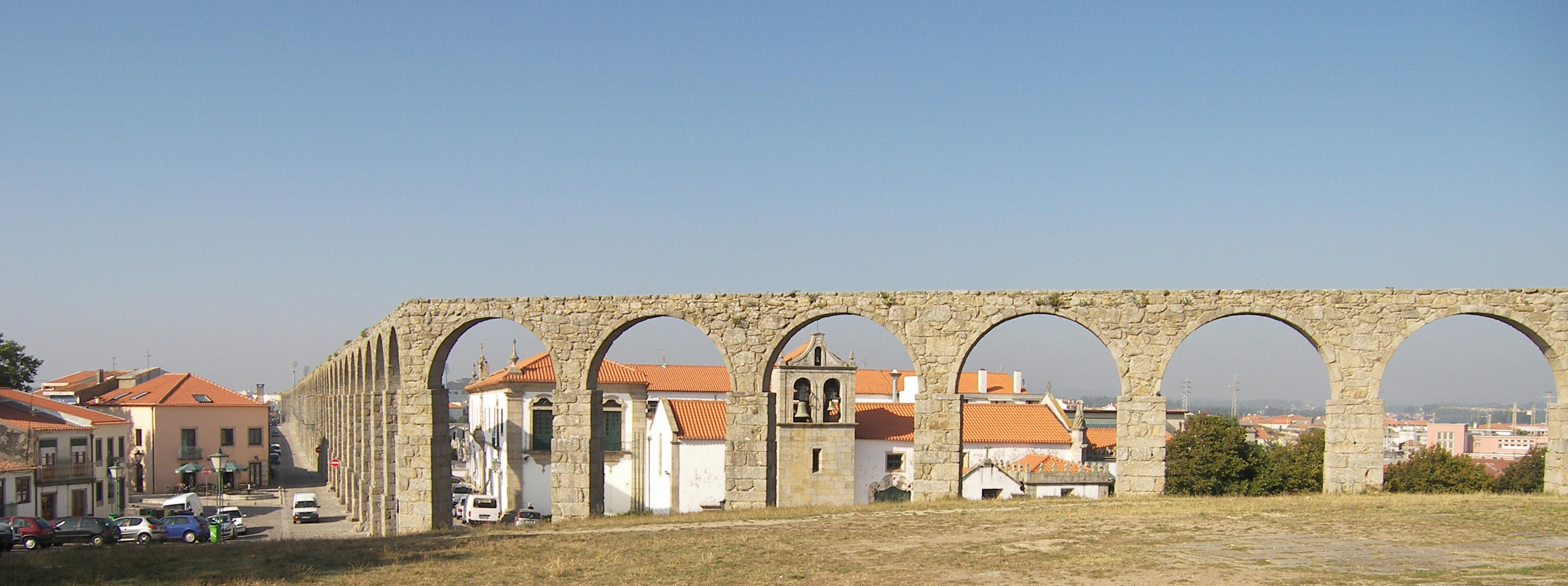
An aqueduct in Vila do Conde, Portugal

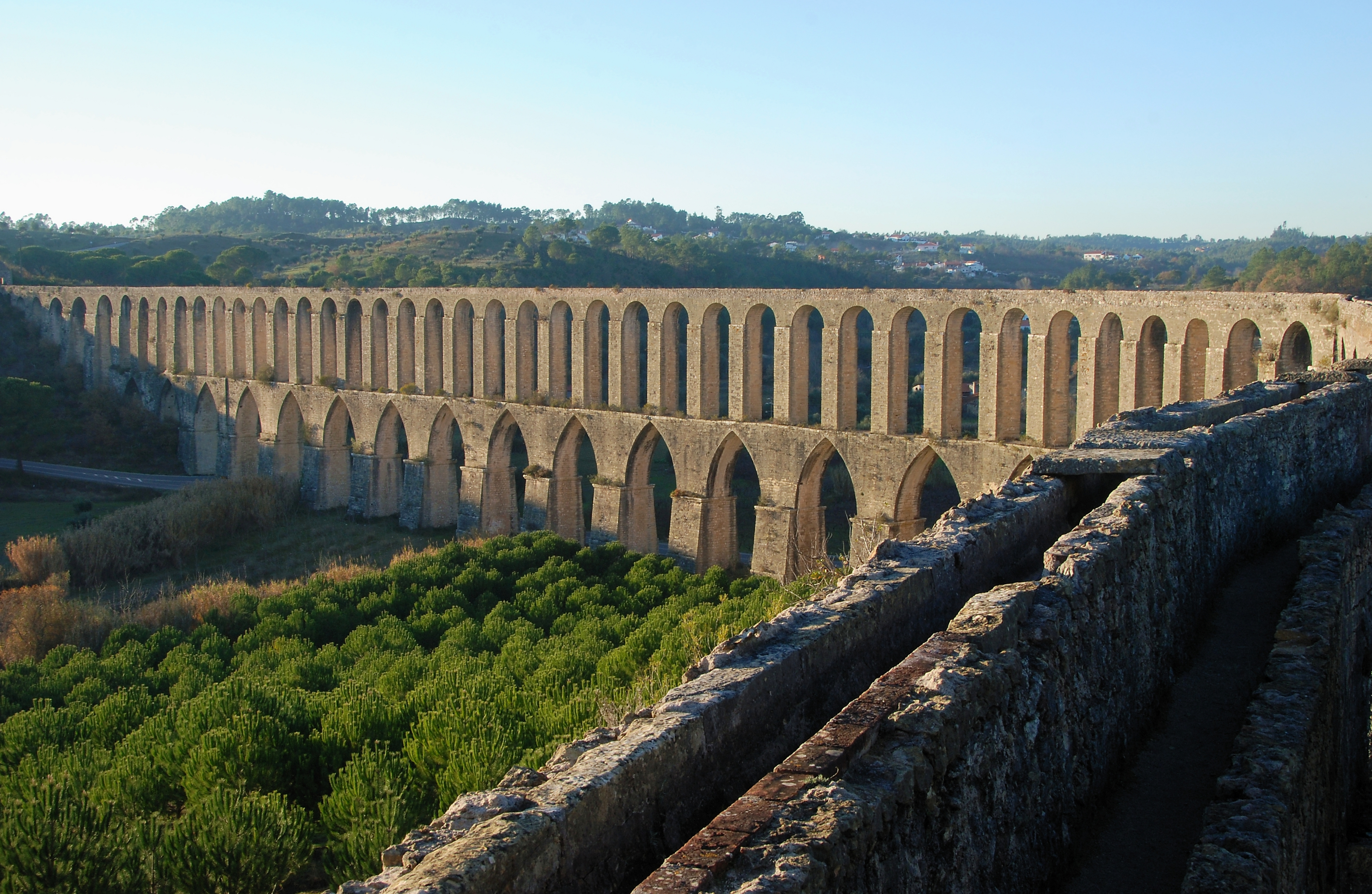
The Aqueduto dos Pegões in Tomar, Portugal

- Aqueduto da Amoreira, in Elvas, Portugal (built 1537–1620)
- Águas Livres Aqueduct, in Lisbon, Portugal (built 1731–1748)
- Aqueduto de Óbidos, in Óbidos, Portugal (built 1570)
- Aqueduto de Setúbal in Setúbal, Portugal (built 1696)
- Aqueduto dos Pegões in Tomar, Portugal (built 1593)
- Água de Prata Aqueduct, in Évora, Portugal (built 1531–1537)
- Santa Clara Aqueduct, in Vila do Conde, Portugal

Russia

- Rostokino Aqueduct in Moscow (built 1780–1804)

Spain

- Aqueduct of Teruel, Spain

==== Middle East ====
- Tabarja in Lebanon, aqueduct runs throughout the entire ancient town and is still actively used by the farmers of the area (built 1700–1750)

==== North America ====
- Greater Winnipeg Water District Aqueduct, Manitoba, Canada – built between 1915 and 1919
- High Bridge, part of the former Croton Aqueduct, built in 1848, is the oldest surviving bridge in New York City

==== Latin America ====
- Carioca Aqueduct in Rio de Janeiro, Brazil (built 1744–1750)
- Surviving Spanish aqueducts in Mexico:
  - Aqueduct of Querétaro, Mexico – built between 1726 and 1738, 1.3 kilometres (0.81 mi) long and featuring 74 arches
  - Aqueduct of Zacatecas, Zacatecas.
  - Aqueduct of Padre Tembleque, Zempoala, Hidalgo Mexico – built between 1553 and 1570
  - Aqueduct of Morelia, Michoacán, built between 1735 and 1738
  - Aqueduct of Los Remedios, Naucalpan, Mexico, 1765
  - Aqueduct of Acámbaro, Guanajuato, built in 1528
  - Chapultepec aqueduct, Mexico City
  - Aqueduct of Guadalupe, Mexico City – present-day only partially preserved due Modern avenues works
  - Del Carmen Arch, San Cristóbal de las Casas, Chiapas
  - Aqueduct of Guadalupe, Chiapas
- Aqueduct of Bogotá, Colombia, built in 1955, notable by being the most modern aqueduct of Latin America in the 20th century.

==== India ====
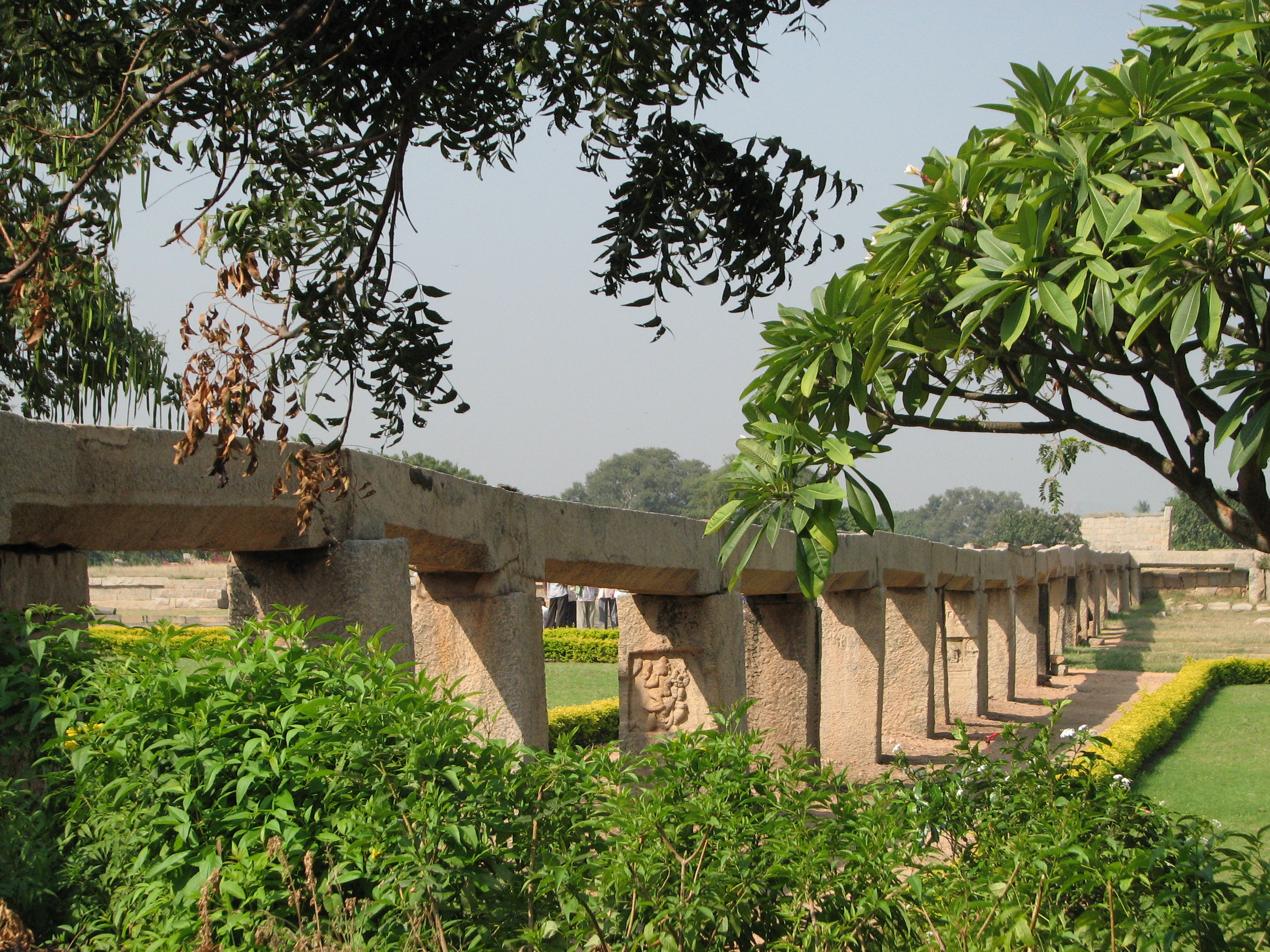
Aqueduct in Hampi, India (14th century)

- Mathur Aqueduct in Tamil Nadu state, India

==== Australia ====
- Boothtown Aqueduct in Sydney, Australia (built 1886–1888)

== Gallery ==
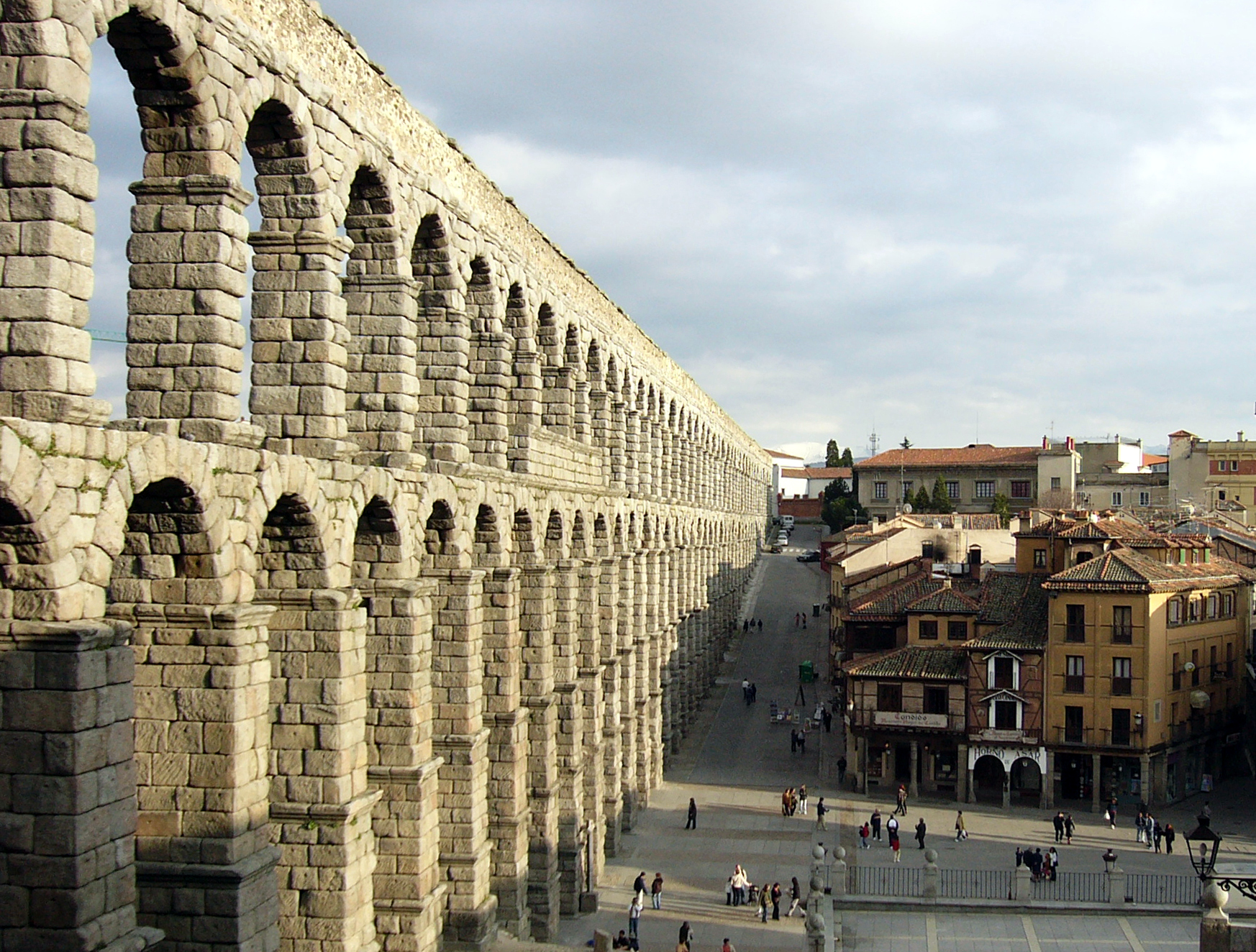
Aqueduct in Segovia, Spain

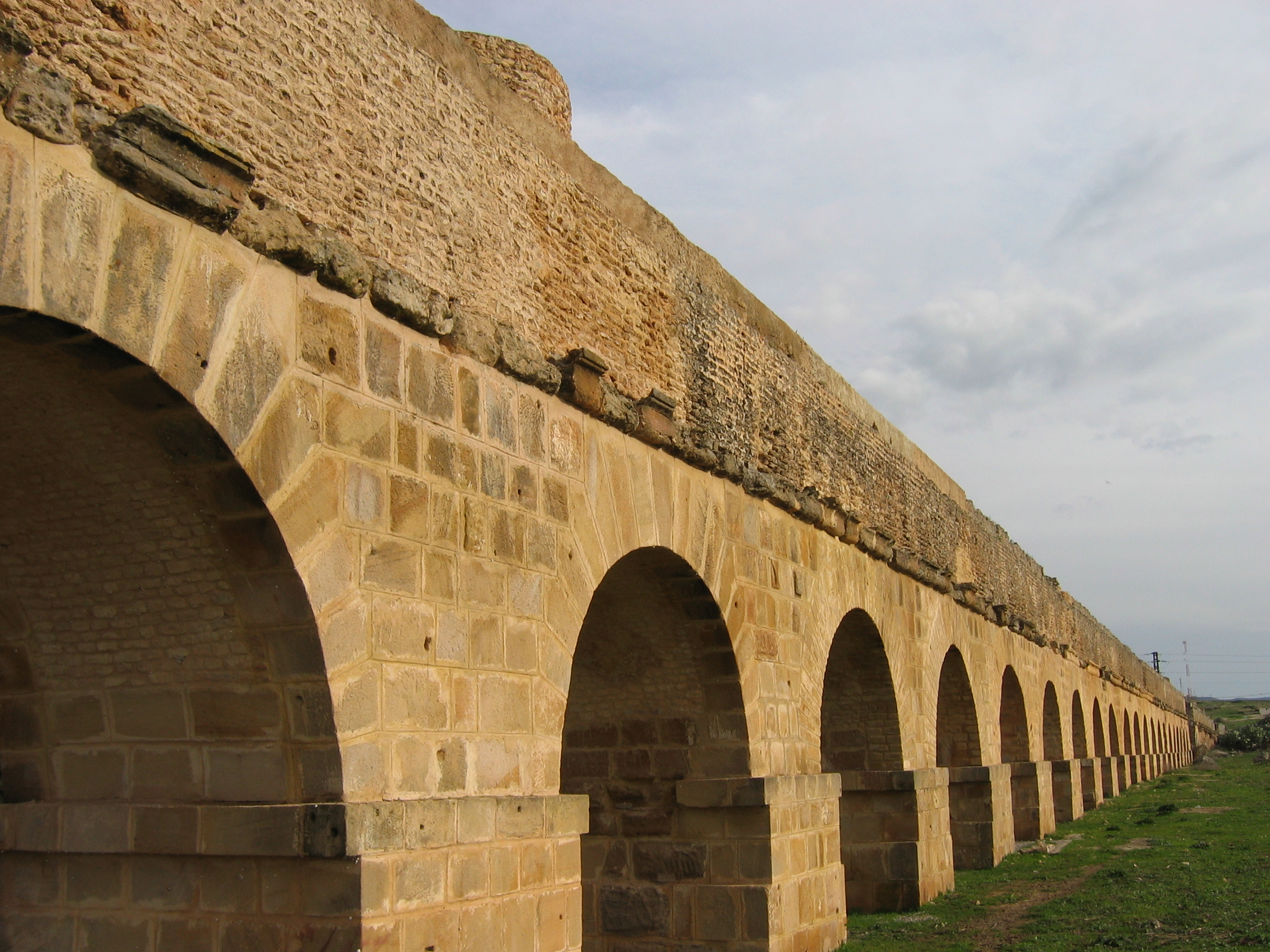
Roman aqueduct supplying Carthage, Tunisia

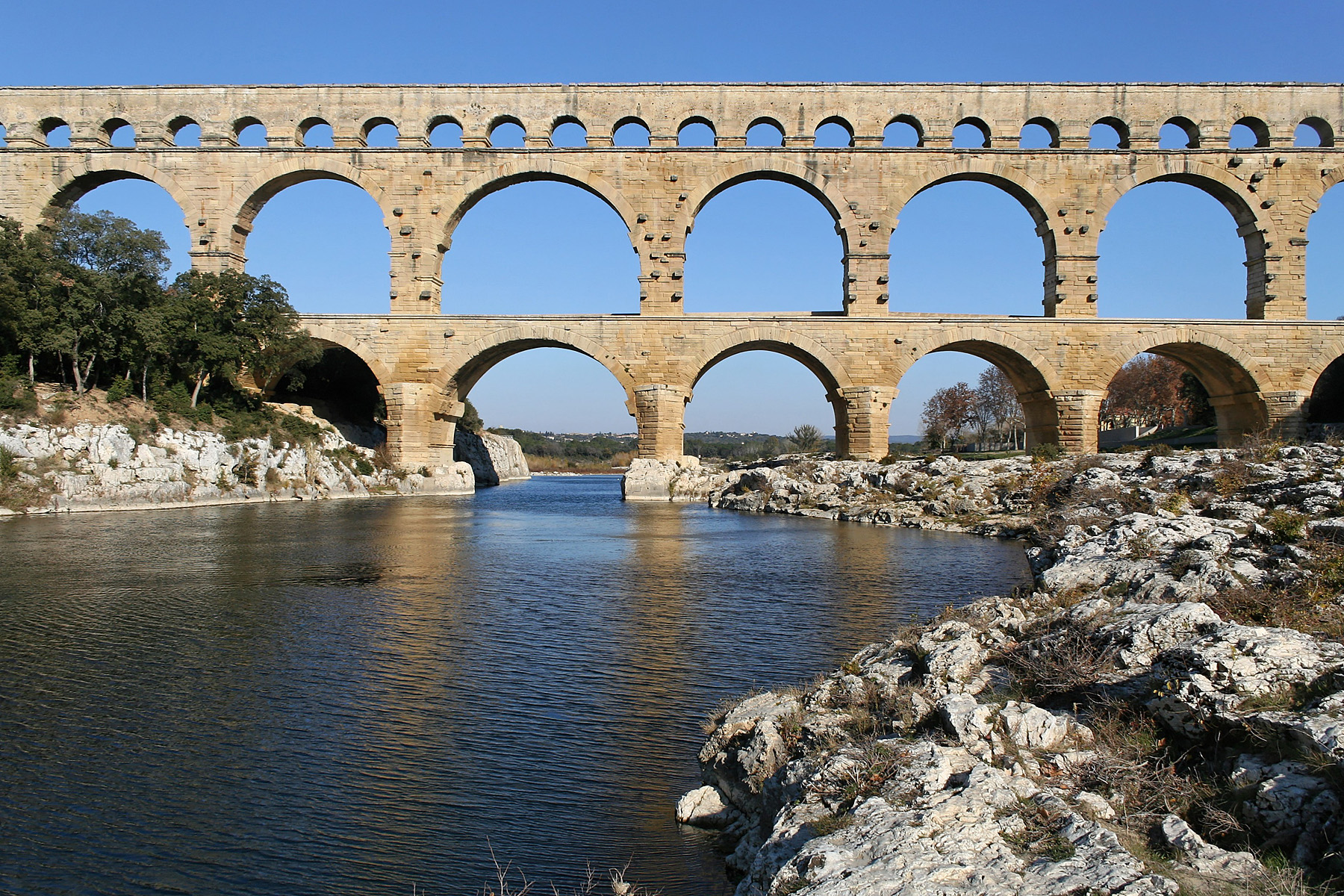
Pont du Gard near the town of Vers-Pont-du-Gard in southern France

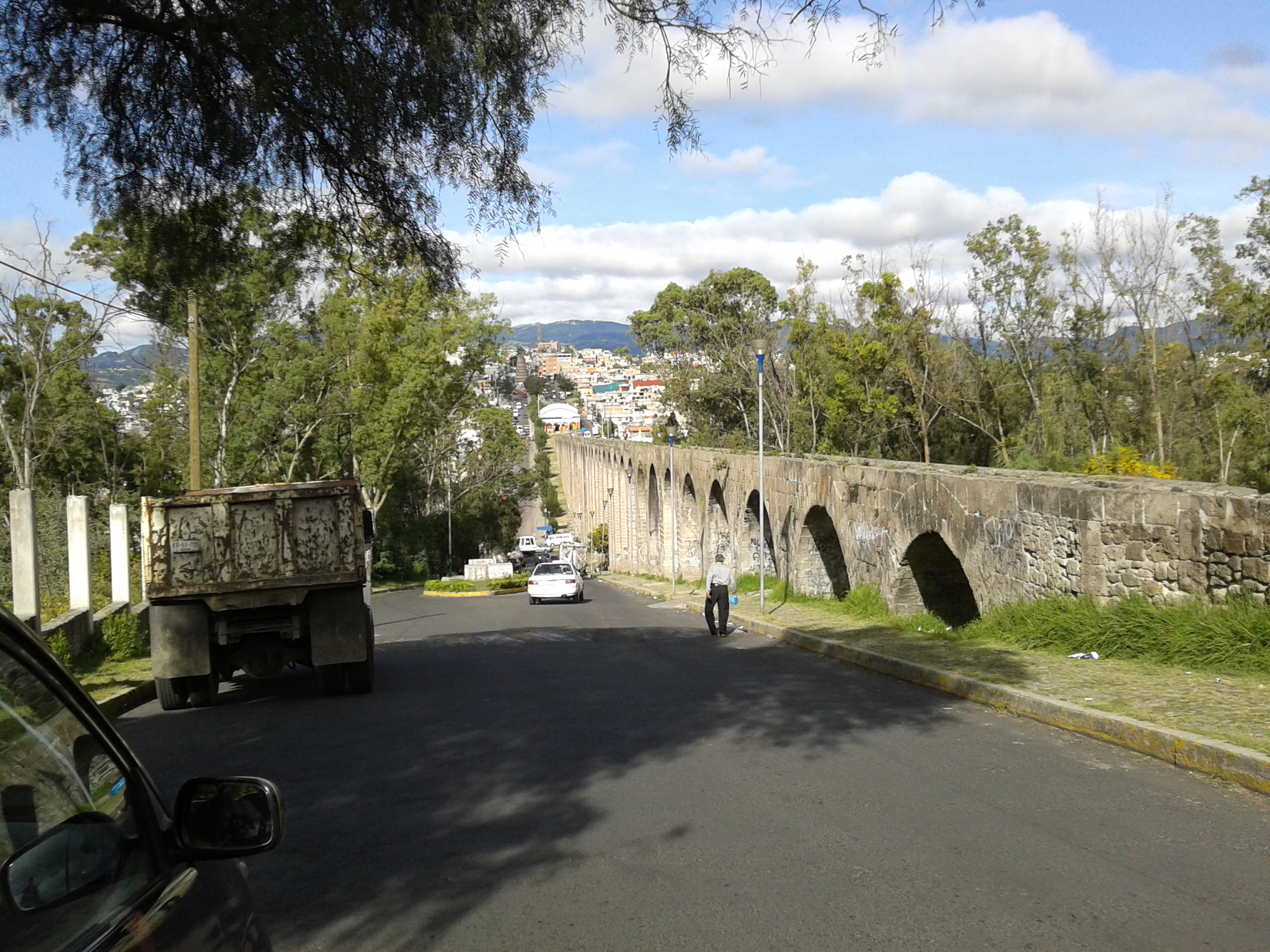
De los Remedios Aqueduct, Naucalpan, Mexico

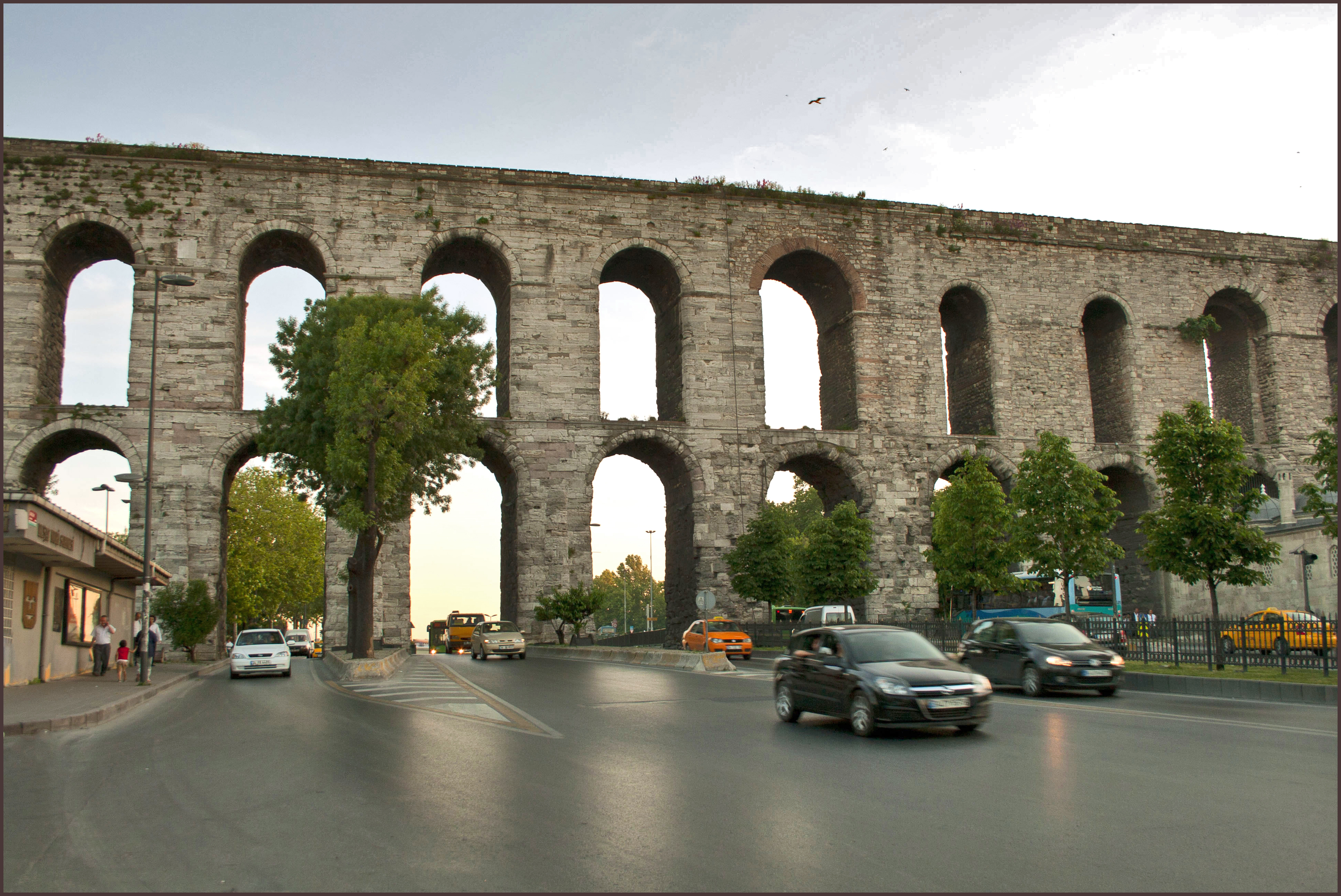
Aqueduct of Valens, Istanbul

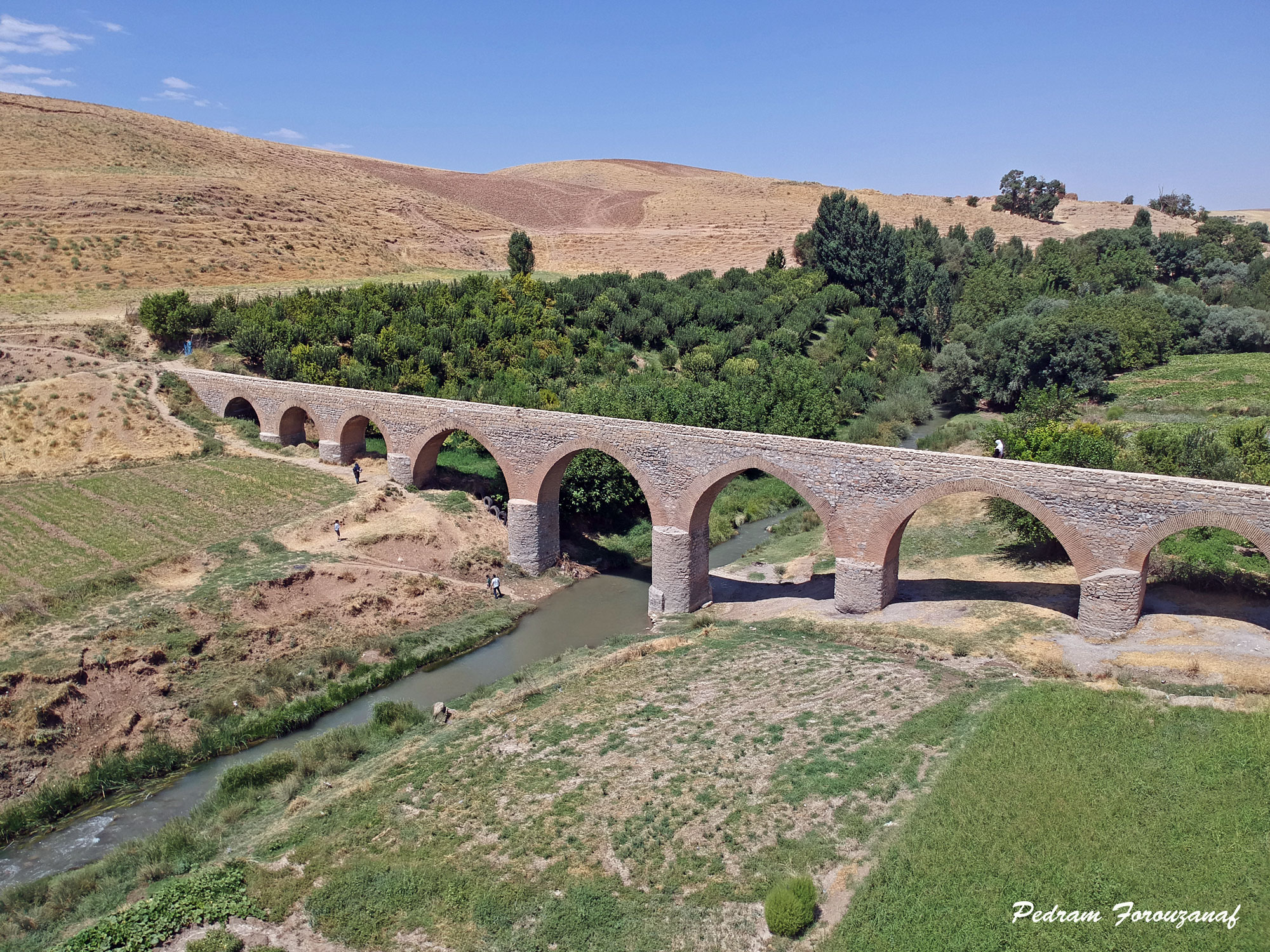
Qaleh-ye Hatam bridge in Borujerd, west of Iran

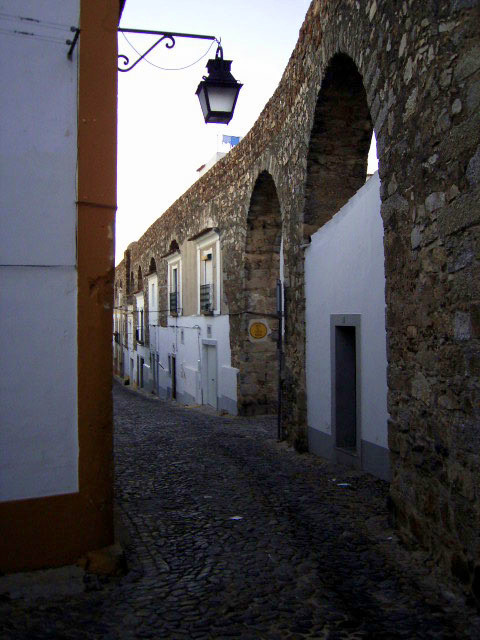
Traditional homes built between the arches of the Água de Prata Aqueduct in Évora, Portugal

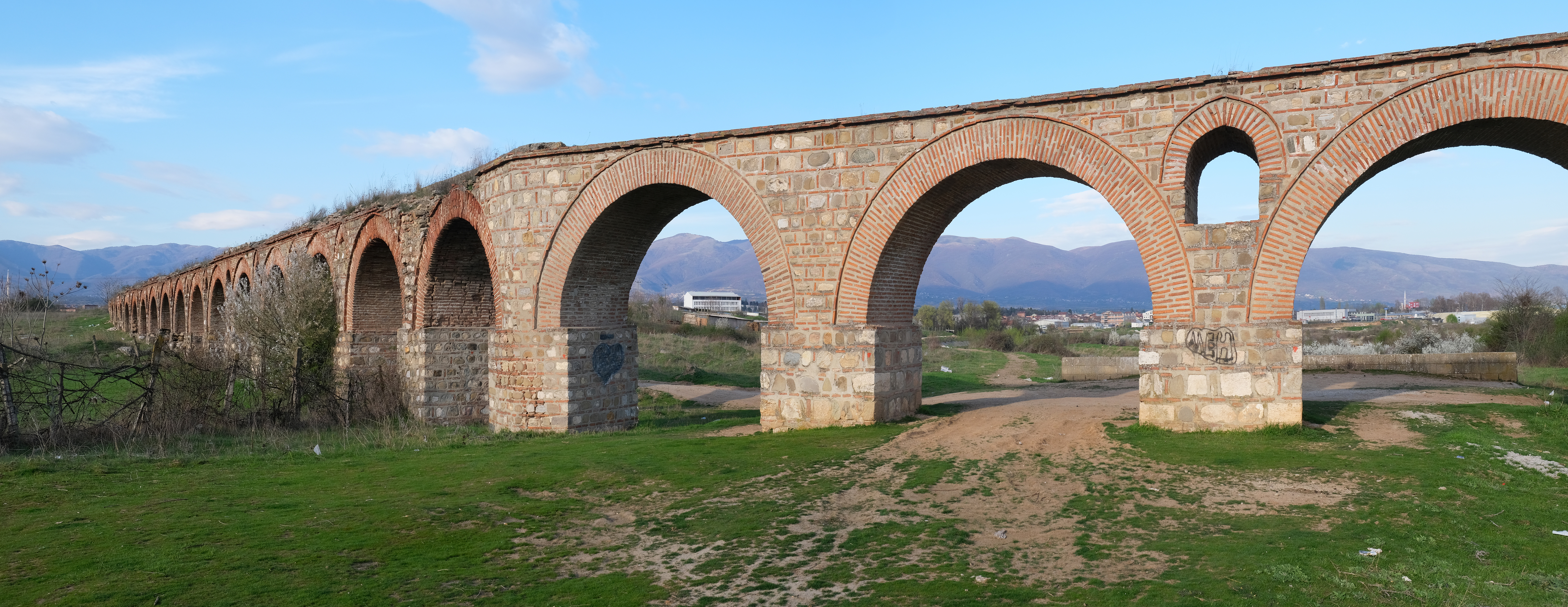
Roman-era Skopje Aqueduct near Skopje, North Macedonia

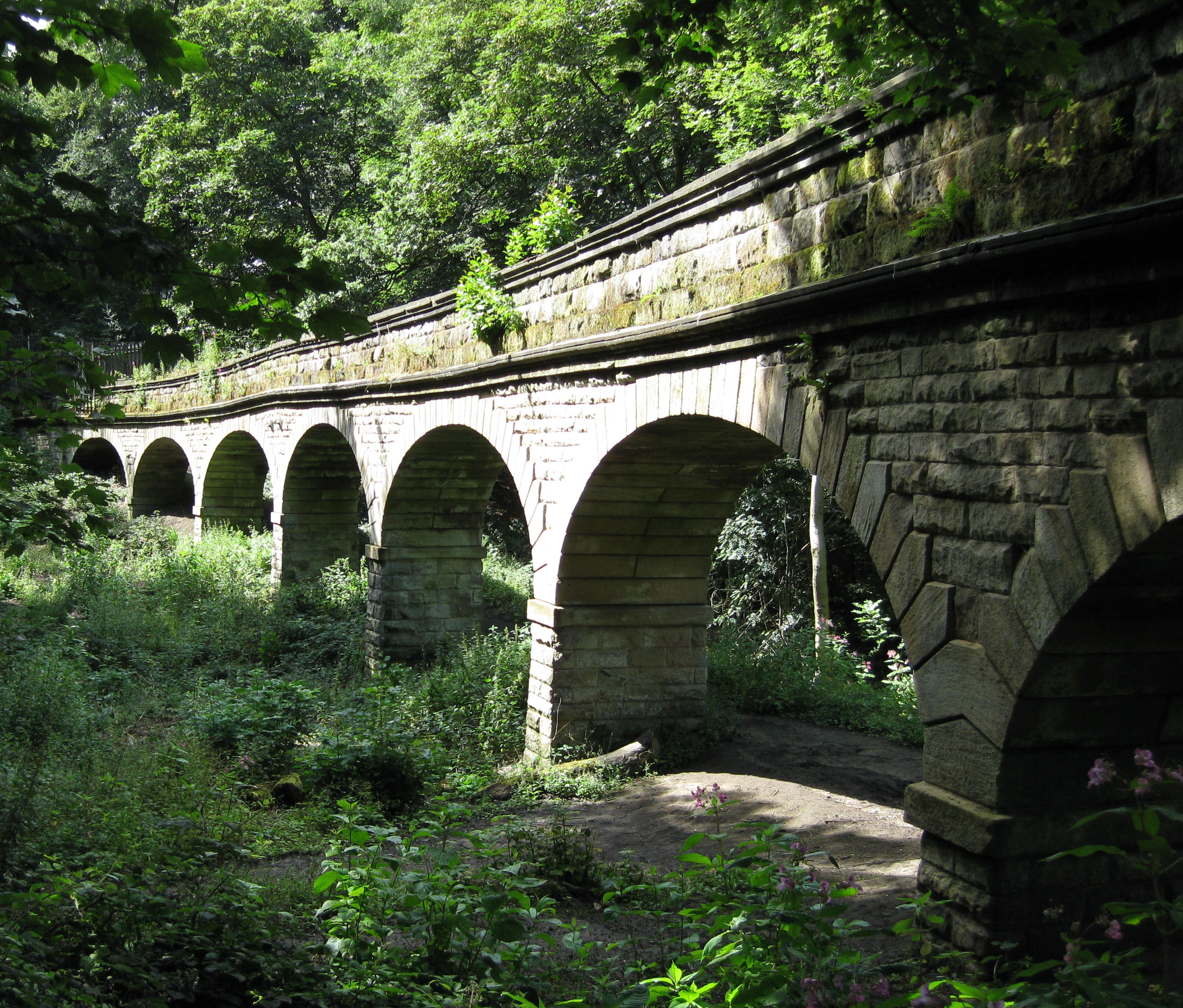
A small disused aqueduct in Leeds, England

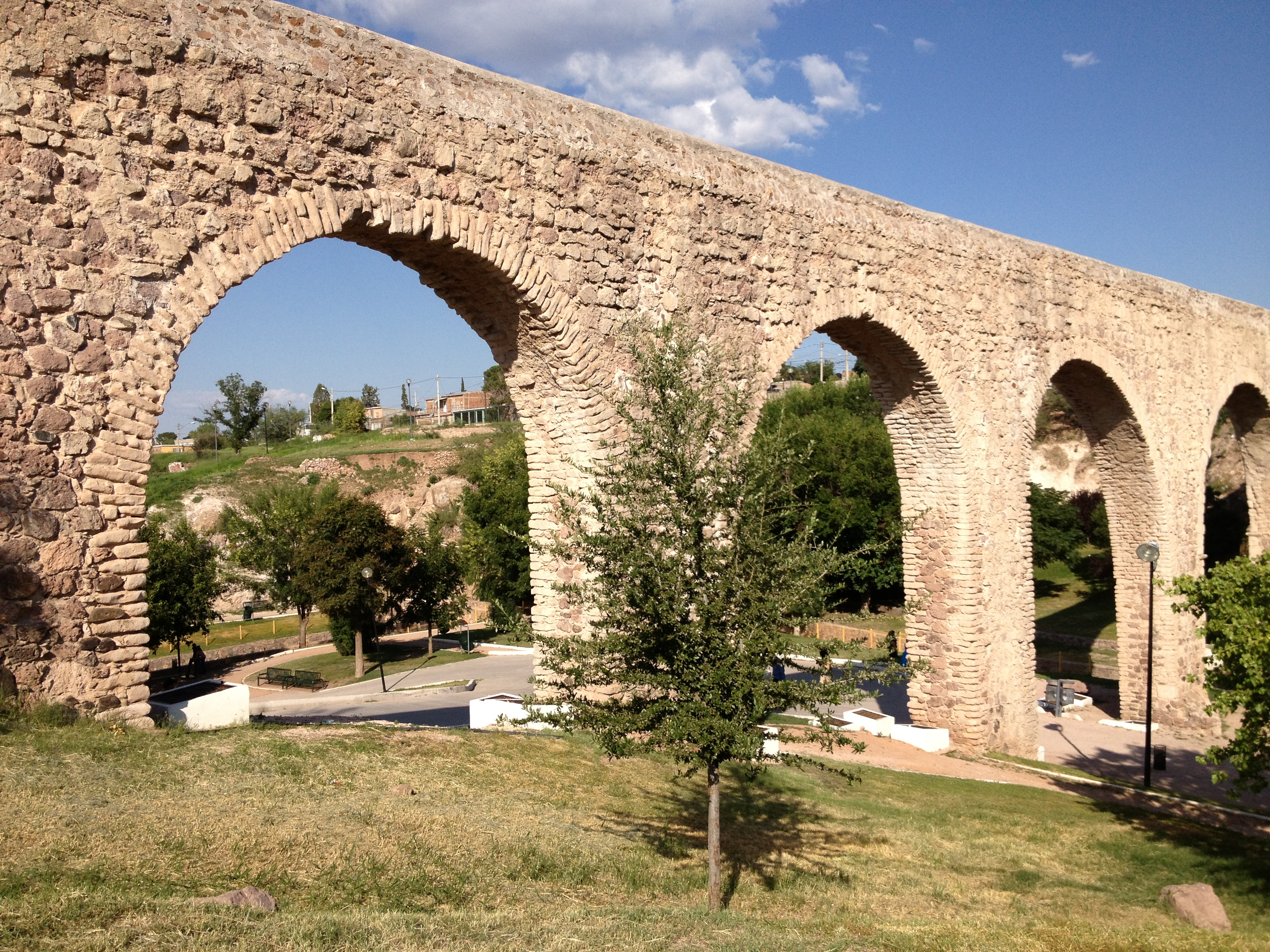
Aqueduct in Chihuahua, Mexico

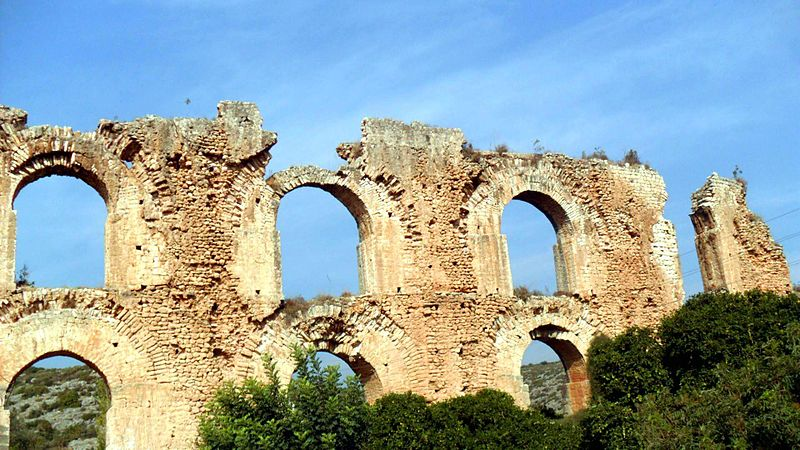
Ruins of Lamas Aqueduct a Roman Aqueduct near Mersin, Turkey

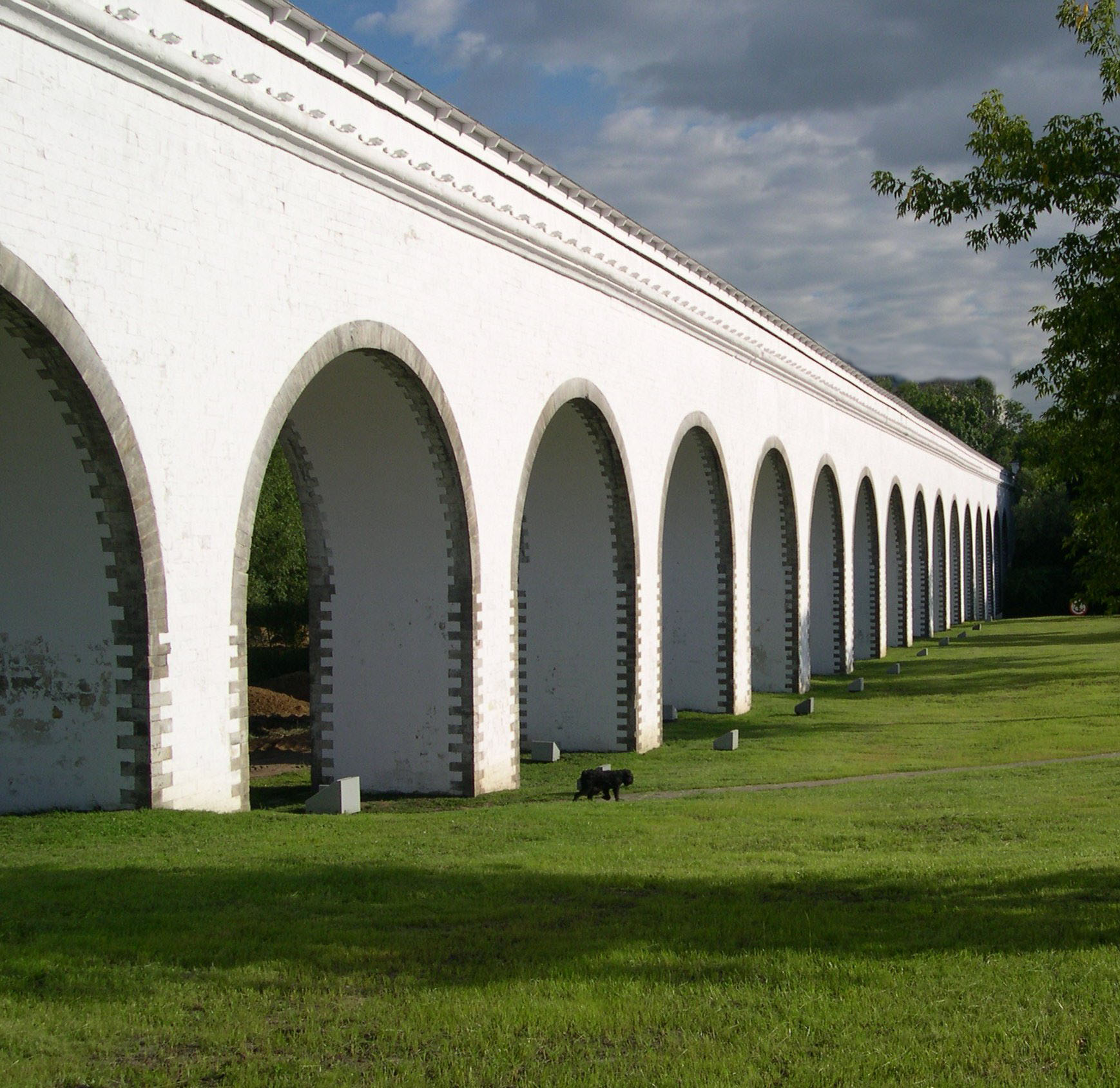
Rostokino Aqueduct in Moscow

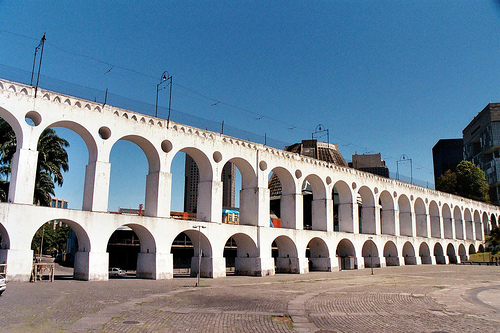
Carioca Aqueduct in Rio de Janeiro, Brazil

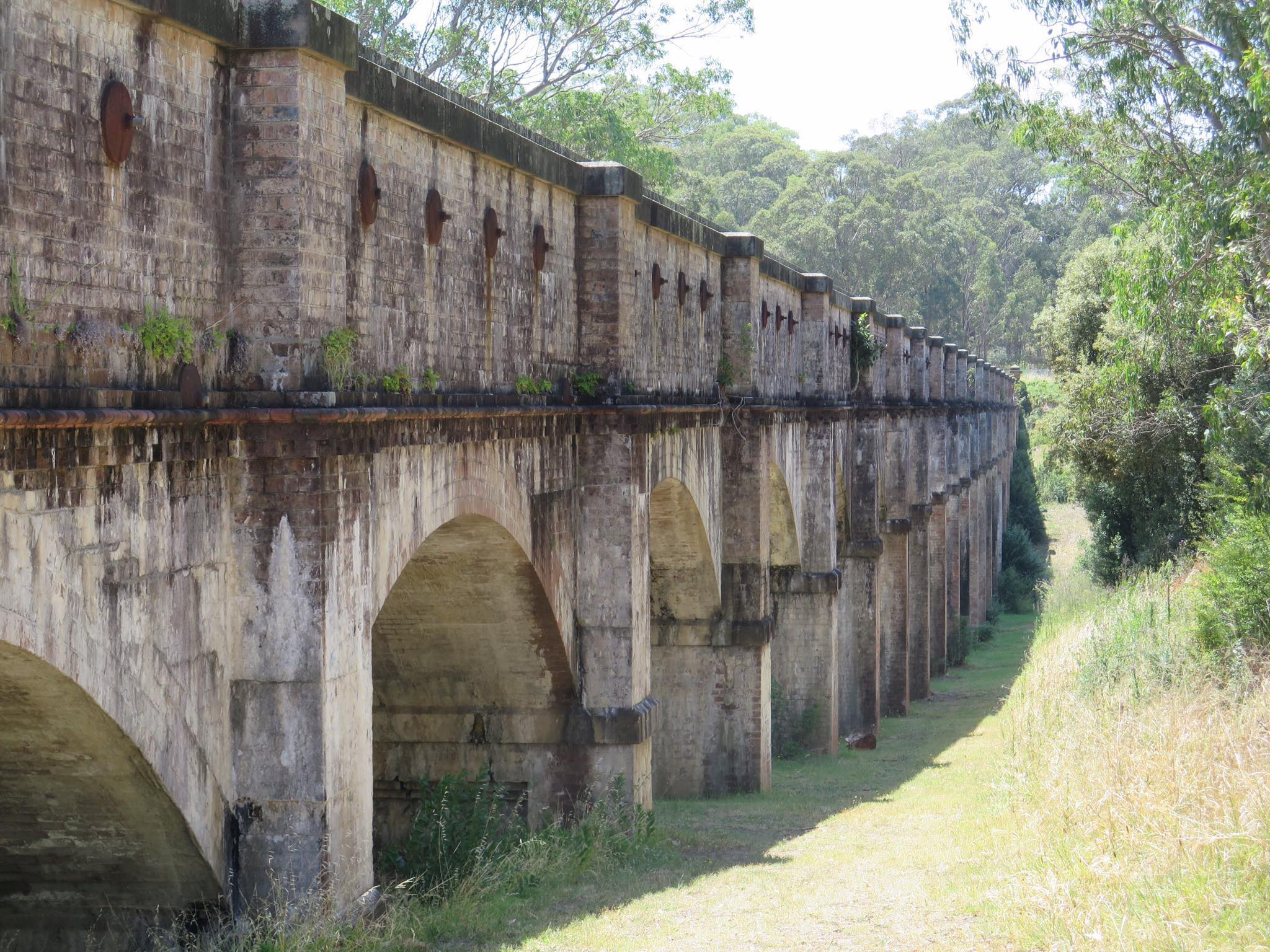
19th-century aqueduct in Sydney, Australia

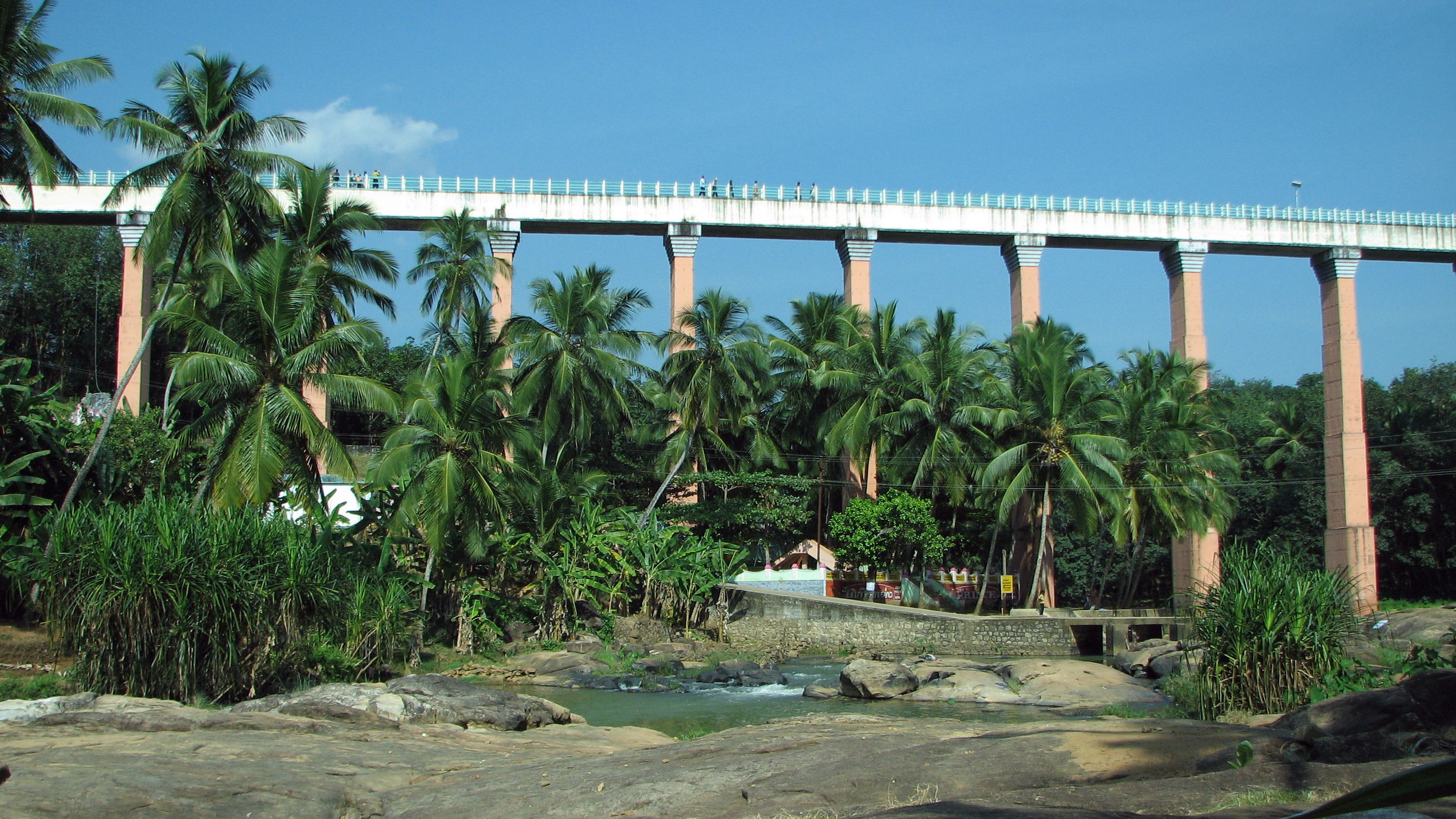
Mathur Aqueduct, India, built in 1966

== See also ==
- List of bridge types
- Ancient Roman architecture
- Ancient Roman engineering
- List of aqueducts
- List of canal aqueducts in the United Kingdom
- List of Roman aqueduct bridges
- Pipeline – some used to carry water
- Viaduct
- Water resources
