= Mathur Aqueduct =

Bridge in India

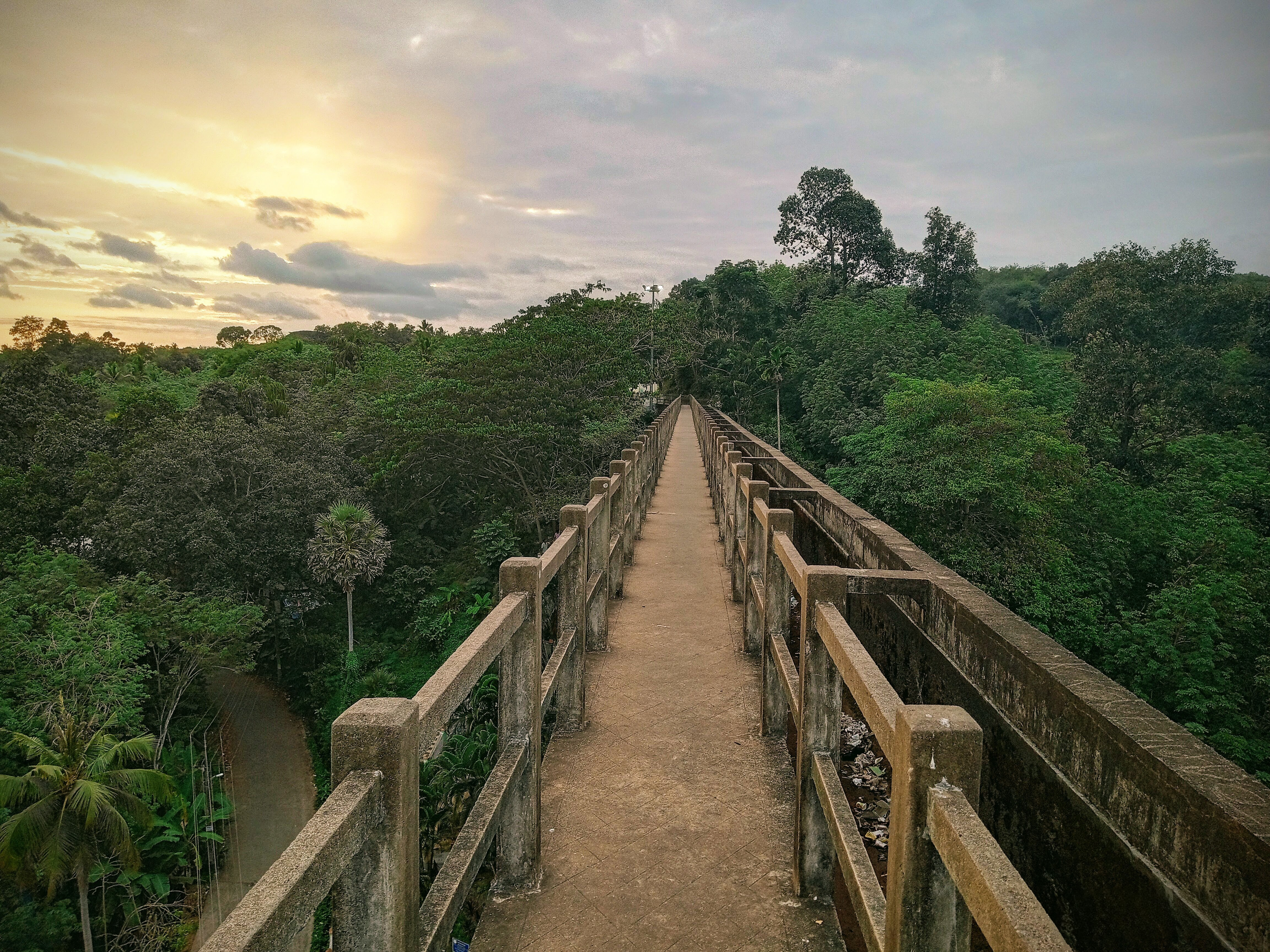
- A evening view along the walkway of Mathur Aqueduct.

- Location within Tamil Nadu

General information
- Type: Reinforced concrete aqueduct
- Location: Mathur, India
- Coordinates: 8°20′10″N 77°17′40″E
- Construction started: 1966
- Completed: 1966
- Cost: ₹12.9 lakhs (1966)
- Client: Government of Tamil Nadu (Irrigation Department)

Height
- Height: 115 ft (35 m)

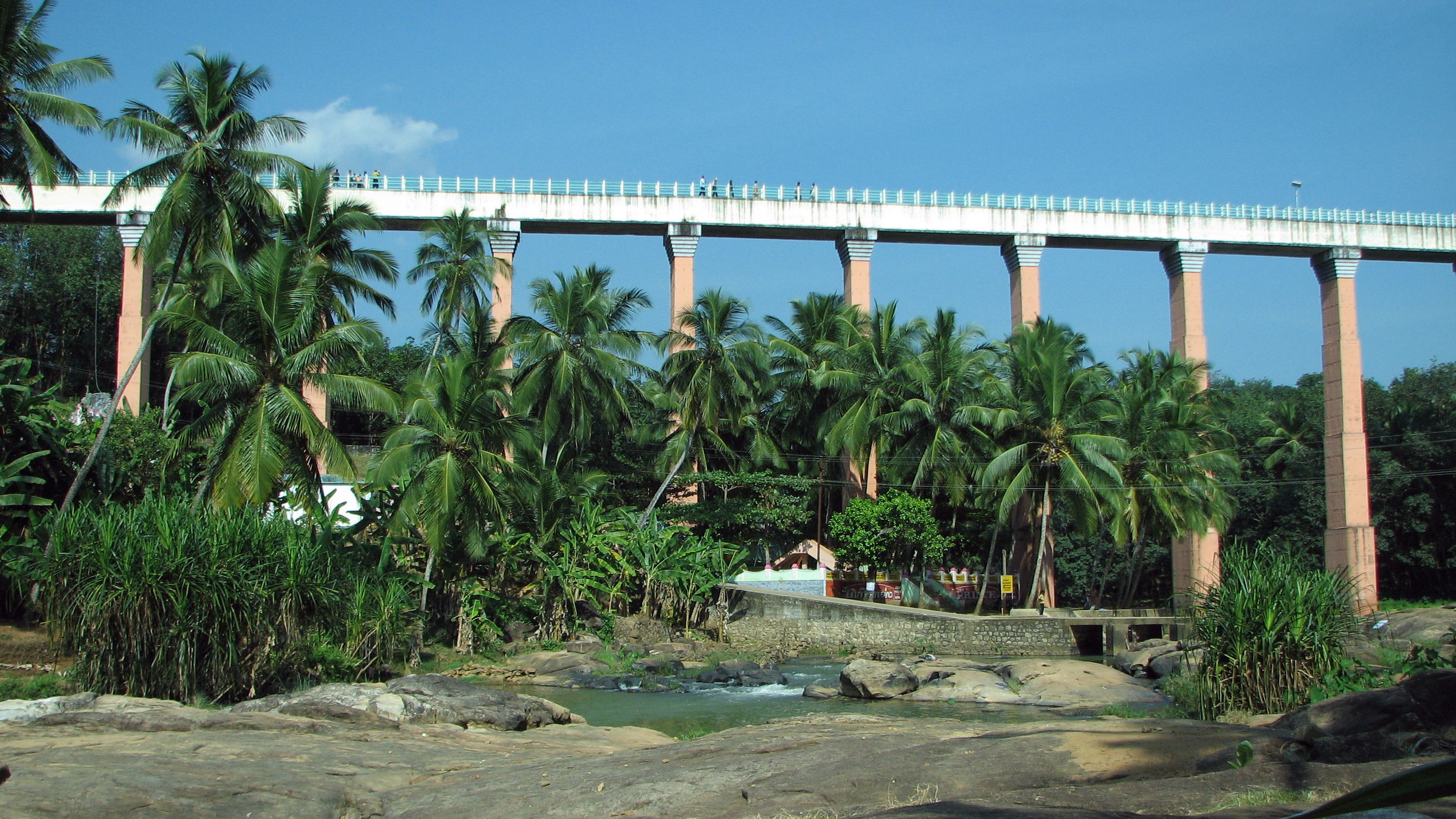
Mathur Aqueduct

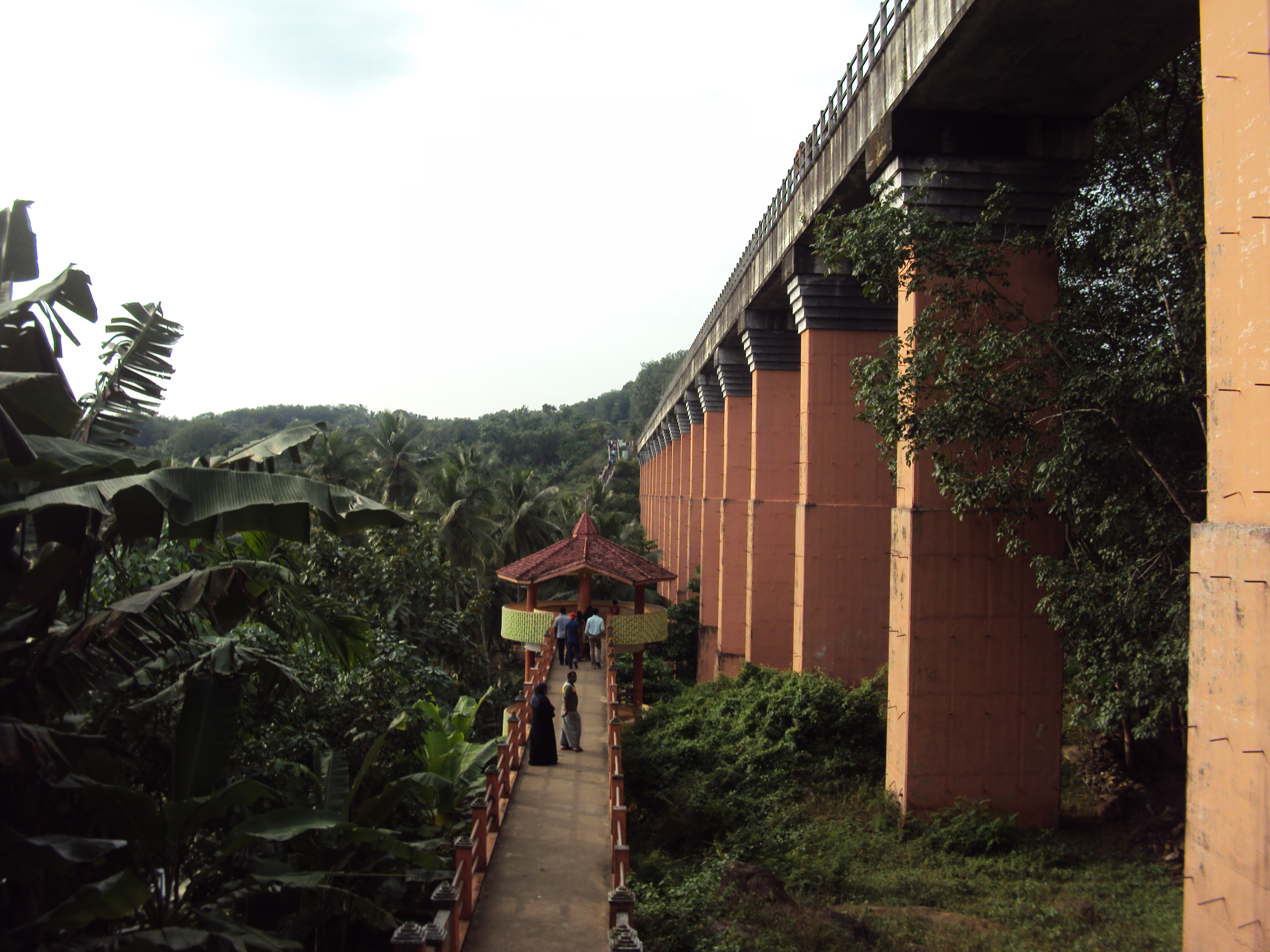
Side View of Mathur Aqueduct

Mathur Aqueduct is an aqueduct in Thiruvattar taluk of Kanniyakumari district of Indian state of Tamil Nadu. It was built in 1966 over the Pahrali River and takes its name from Mathoor, a hamlet near the aqueduct, which is about 3 km from Thiruvattar town and about 60 km from Kanniyakumari.

== Purpose ==
Mathoor Aqueduct was constructed in 1966 as a drought relief measure over the river Pahrali to carry water for irrigation from an elevated level of one hill to another. The irrigation water feeds the taluks of Vilavancode and Kalkulam.

== Construction ==
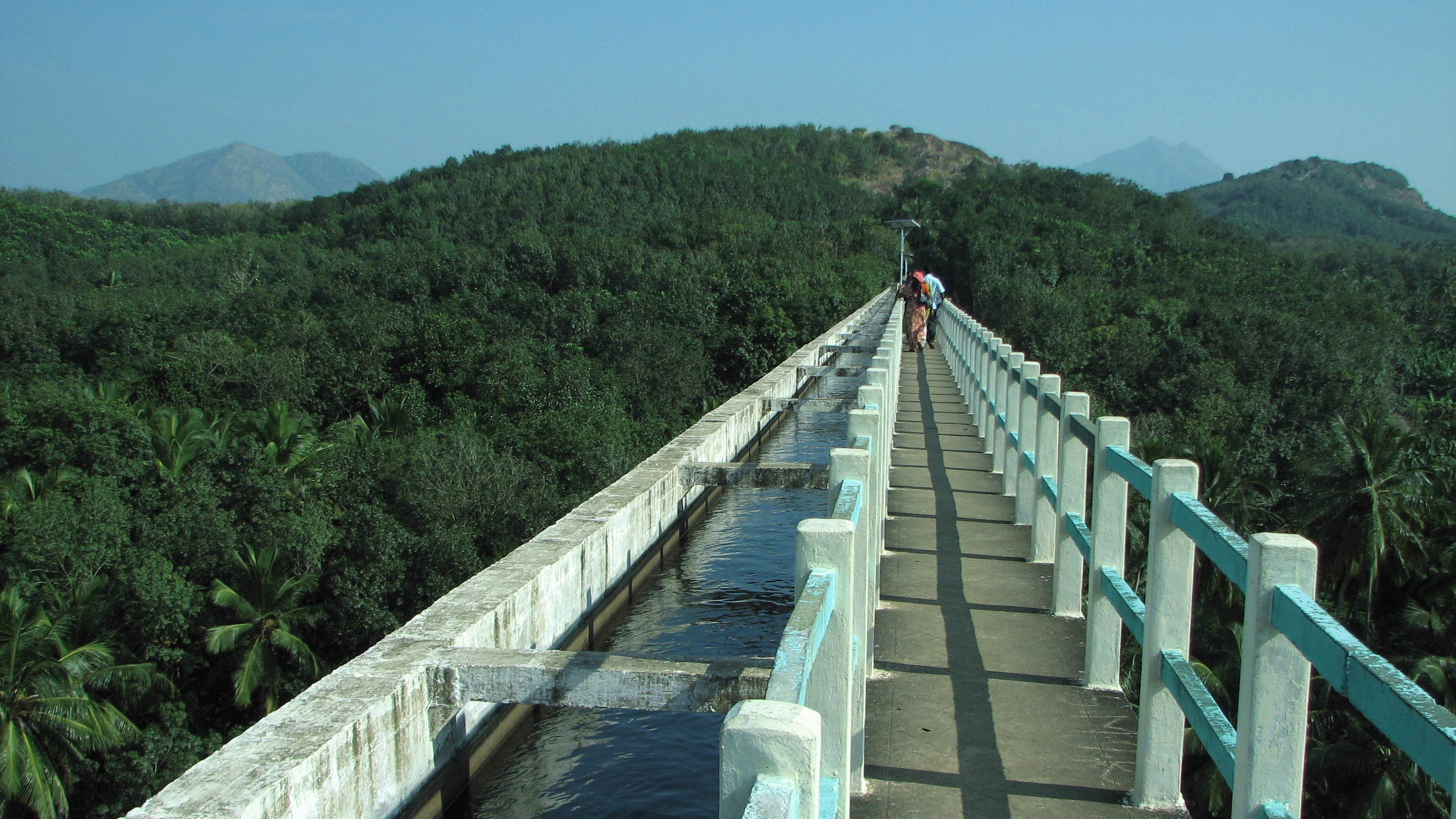
Mathur Aqueduct - one of the largest aqueducts in Asia

The aqueduct is built across the Parali river, a small river that originates in the Mahendragiri, Tamil Nadu hills of the Western Ghats. Mathoor Aqueduct itself carries water of the Pattanamkal canal for irrigation over the Parali, from one hill to another, for a distance of close to 1 km. This aqueduct is needed because of the undulating land terrain of the area, which is also adjacent to the hills of the Western Ghats.

Mathoor Aqueduct is a concrete structure supported by 28 huge pillars, the maximum height of the pillars reaching 115 ft. The trough structure is 7 ft in height, with a width of 7.5 ft. The trough is partly covered with concrete slabs, allowing people to walk on the bridge and to see the water going through the trough. Some of the pillars are set in rocks of the Pahrali river, though some of the pillars are set in hills on either side.The bridge has been constructed at Mathoor across the river Parazhiyar at a cost of Rs. 12.90/- lakhs

There is road access to one end of the aqueduct and to the foot of the aqueduct (the level where the Pahrali flows) on the opposite side. There is a huge flight of stairs, made more recently, that allows one to climb from the level of the Pahrali river to the trough.

Irrigation water flows through the trough for a large part of the year, except in the summer (from February to May).

== Tourist attraction ==
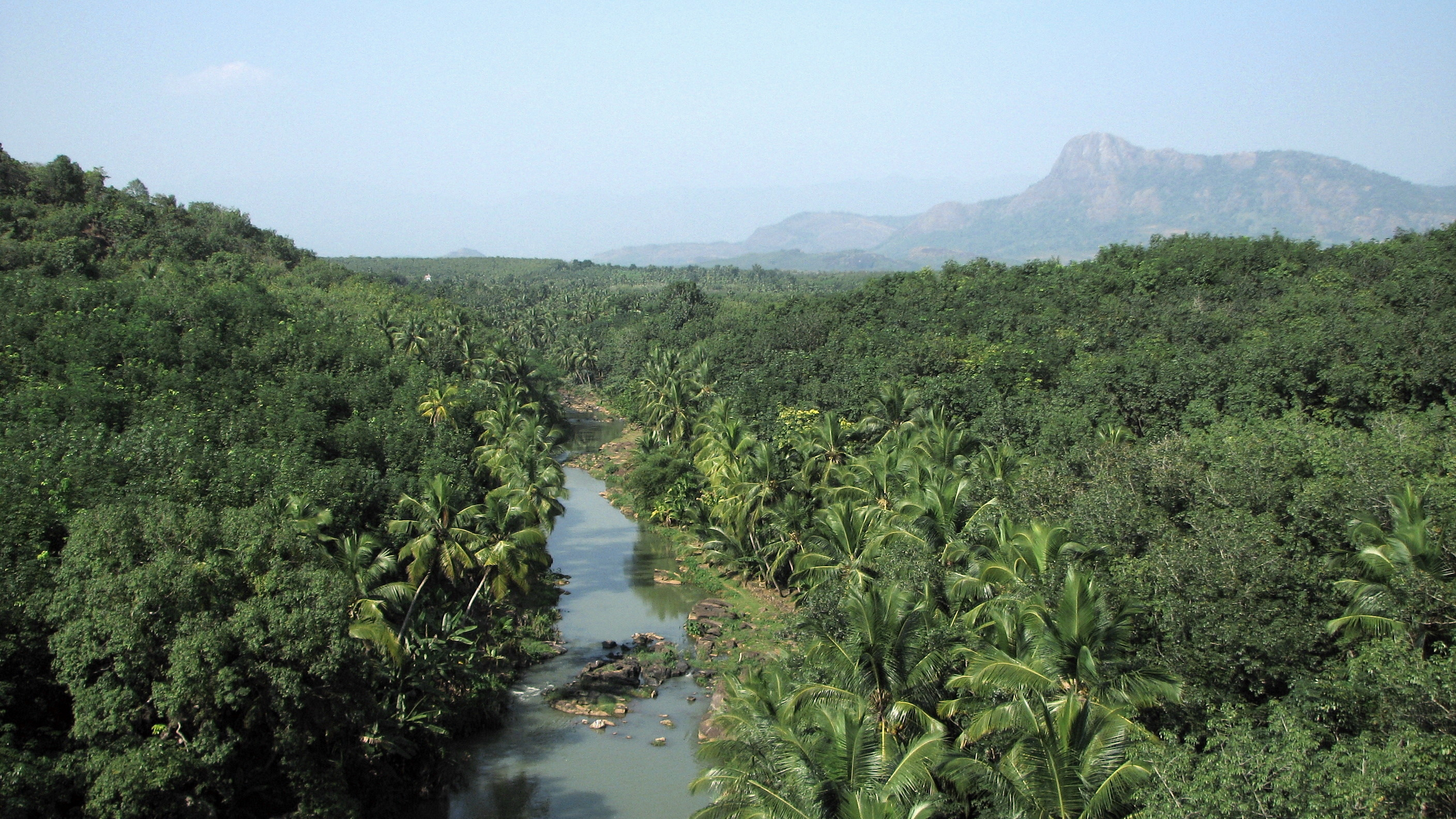
View from the centre of the bridge

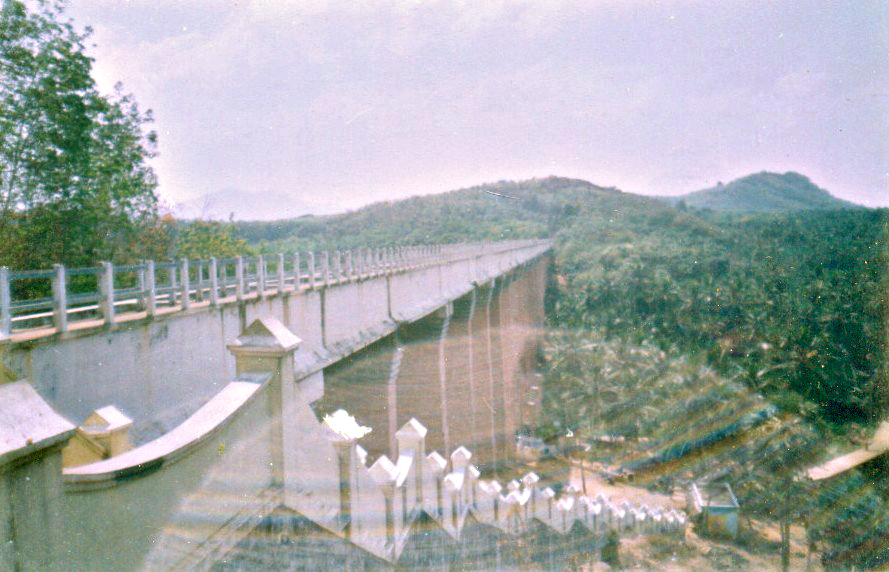
Mathur Aqueduct with Western Ghats in background

In recent times, Mathoor Aqueduct has become a popular tourist attraction in Kanyakumari district. The tourism department and the local Panchyat office have improved facilities for visiting tourists.

From the centre of the aqueduct, one can see a vast expanse of greenery, with rolling hills of the Western Ghats in the background, and the meandering Pahrali river flowing below.

Mathoor Aqueduct is about 60 km from the tourist town of Kanyakumari and about 60 km from the city of Trivandrum, the capital of Kerala state.

== Technical specifications ==
Parameter	Value
Length of flume	1,250 ft (380 m)
Width of trough	7.5 ft (2.3 m)
Height of trough	7 ft (2.1 m)
Water velocity	5.1 ft/s (1.6 m/s)
Discharge capacity	204 cu ft/s (5.8 m^{3}/s)
Number of pillars	28
Span length	40 ft (12 m)
Bed level (start)	91 in (2.3 m)
Bed level (end)	90 in (2.3 m)
