= Aqueduct of Kavala =

Aqueduct in Greece

Coordinates: 40.9369°N 24.4155°E

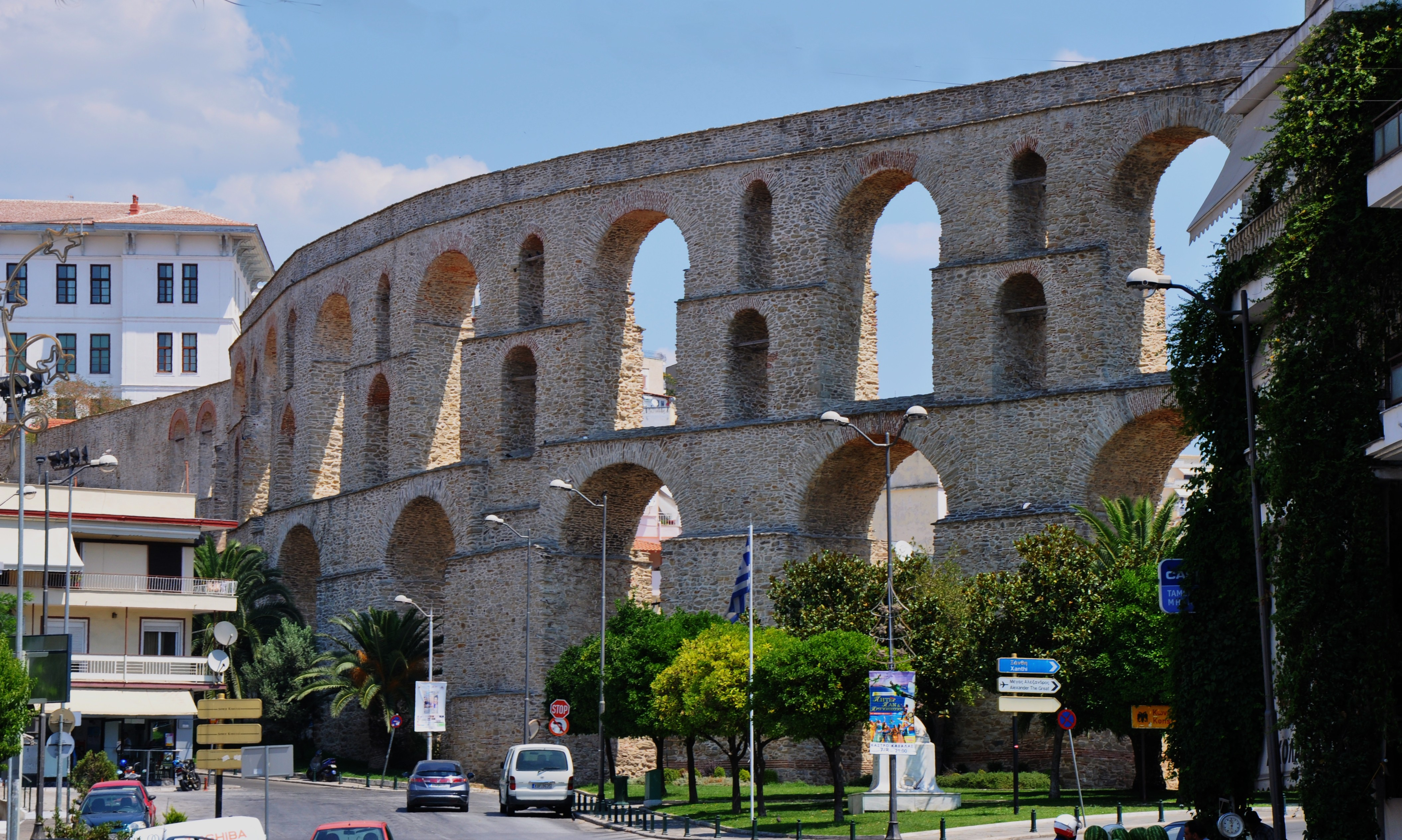
Kavala aqueduct near Nikotsara Square

The Aqueduct of Kavala, popularly known as the Kamares (Greek: Καμάρες, "arches"), is a well-preserved aqueduct in the city of Kavala, Greece, and is one of the city's landmarks.

While the aqueduct is of Roman origin, the present structure was built by the Ottomans in the 16th century. A Byzantine barrier wall of the early 14th century, built as part of the fortifications on the Acropolis of Kavala, probably also functioned as an aqueduct. If so, it would have been a rare example of a Byzantine aqueduct, since Byzantine cities more typically used wells and cisterns rather than either maintaining existing Roman aqueducts or building new ones. The barrier wall was replaced with the present arched aqueduct during Suleiman the Magnificent's repair and improvement of the Byzantine fortifications. Some authors date that construction to the time of the 1522 Siege of Rhodes, but a more likely date is between 1530 and 1536. The acqueduct was restored in 1881 thanks to a donation from Muhammad Ali Pasha, a Kavala native who had been Governor of Egypt since 1805. Ali was also responsible for the construction of the nearby Imaret. As late as 1911, the acqueduct supplied the city with drinking water from Mount Pangaeus.

== Gallery ==
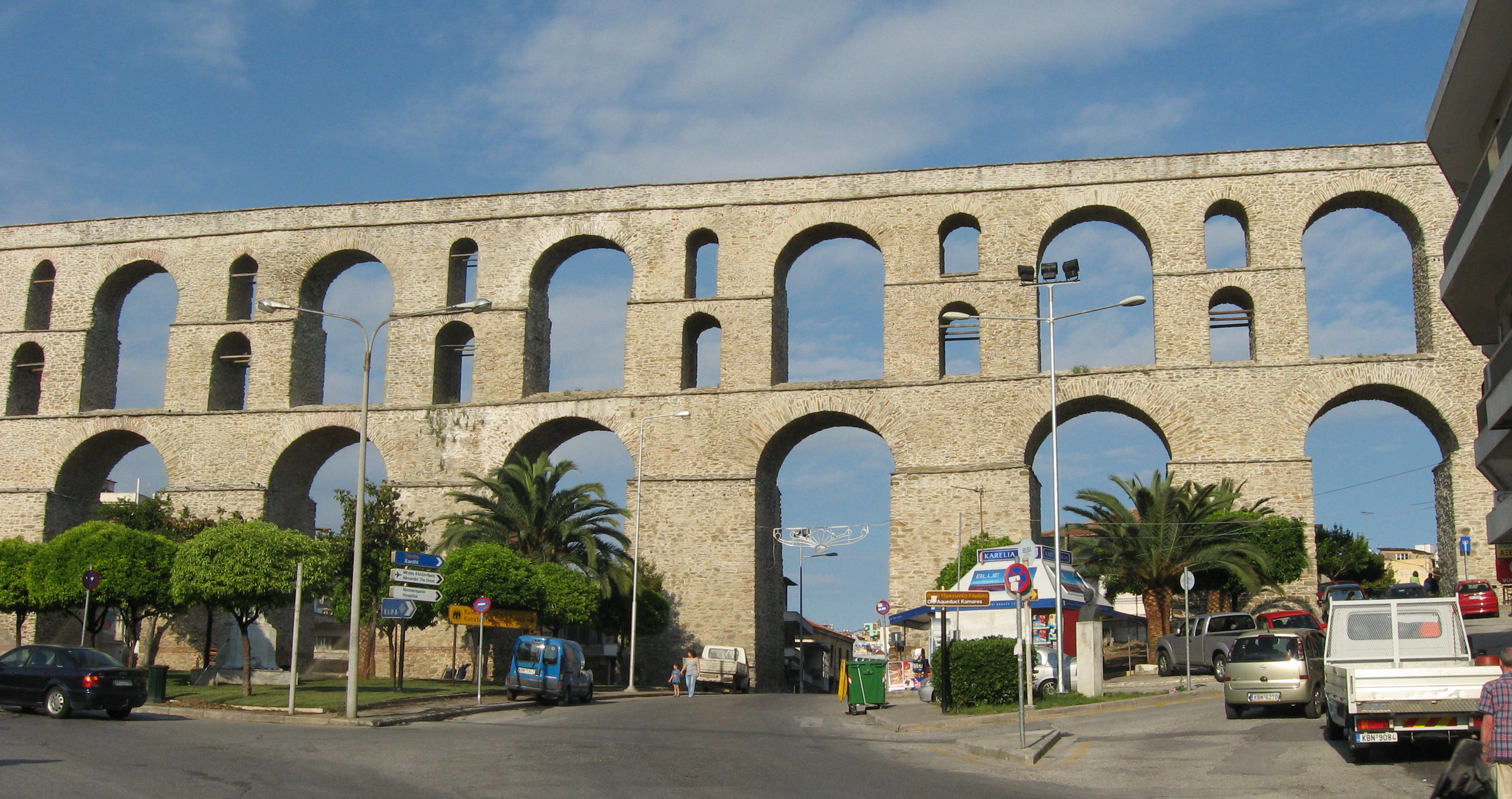

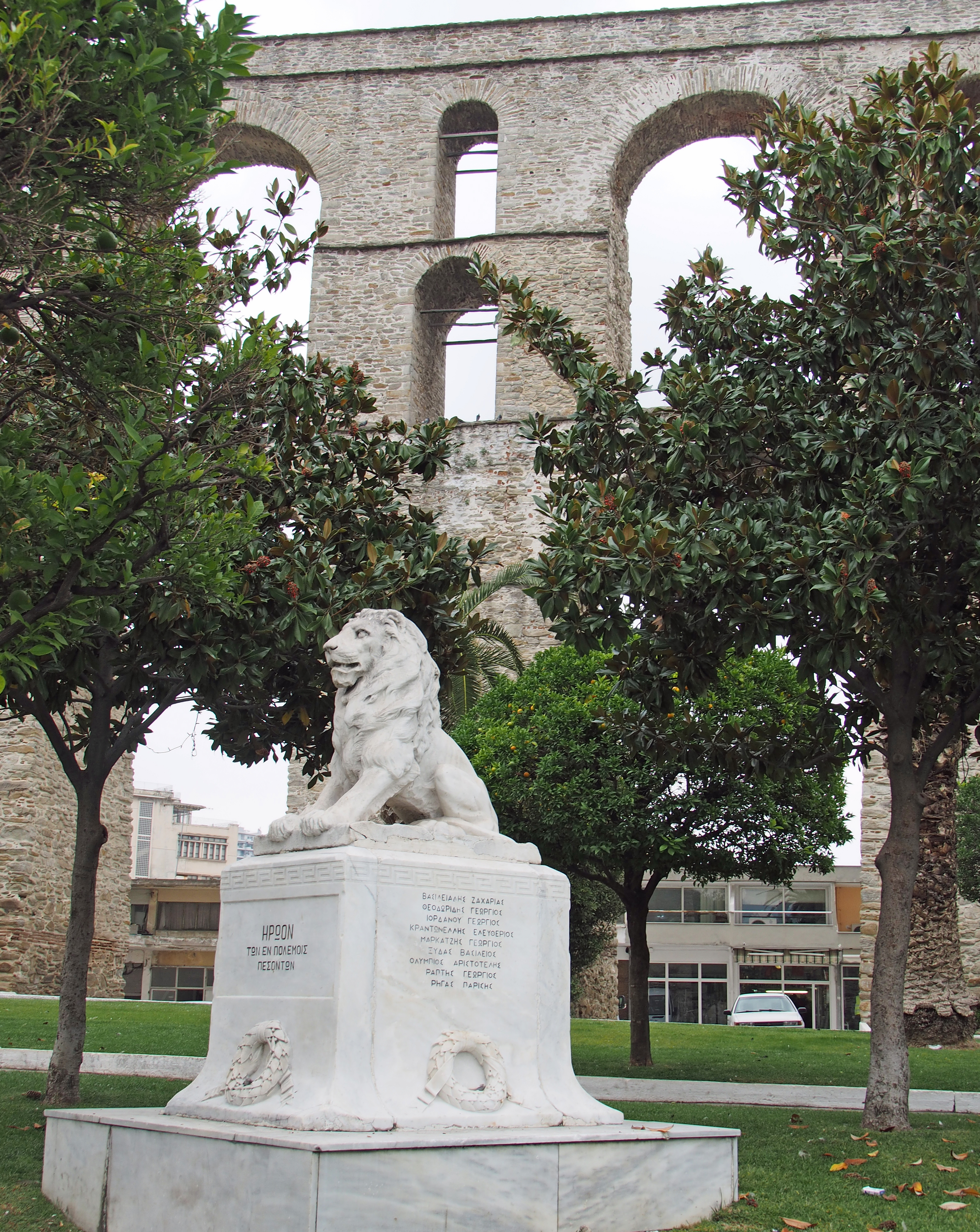

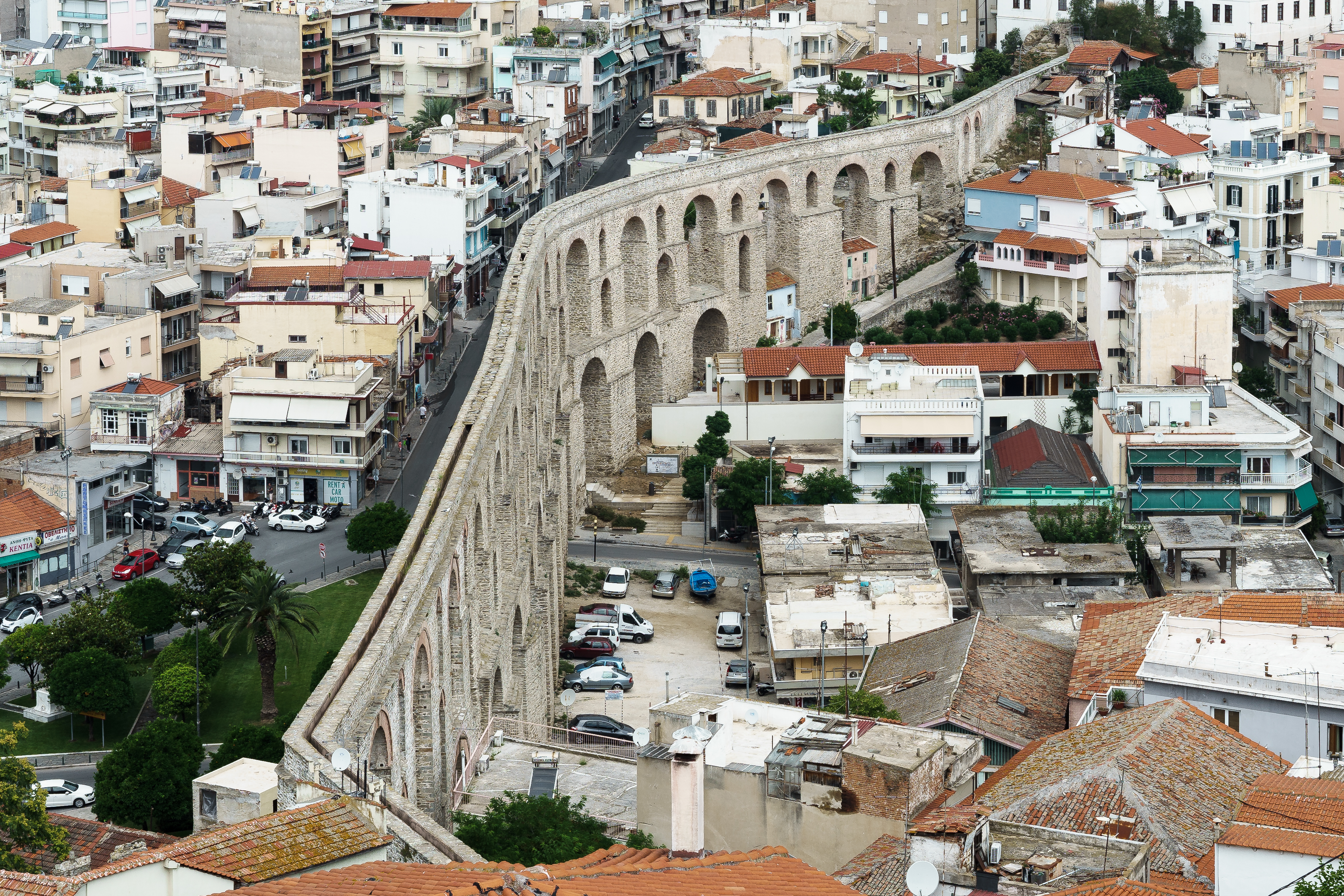

== See also ==
- List of aqueducts in the Roman Empire
