= Água de Prata Aqueduct =

Historic aqueduct in Évora, Portugal

Coordinates: 38.57604°N 7.91221°W

Àgua de Prata Aqueduct
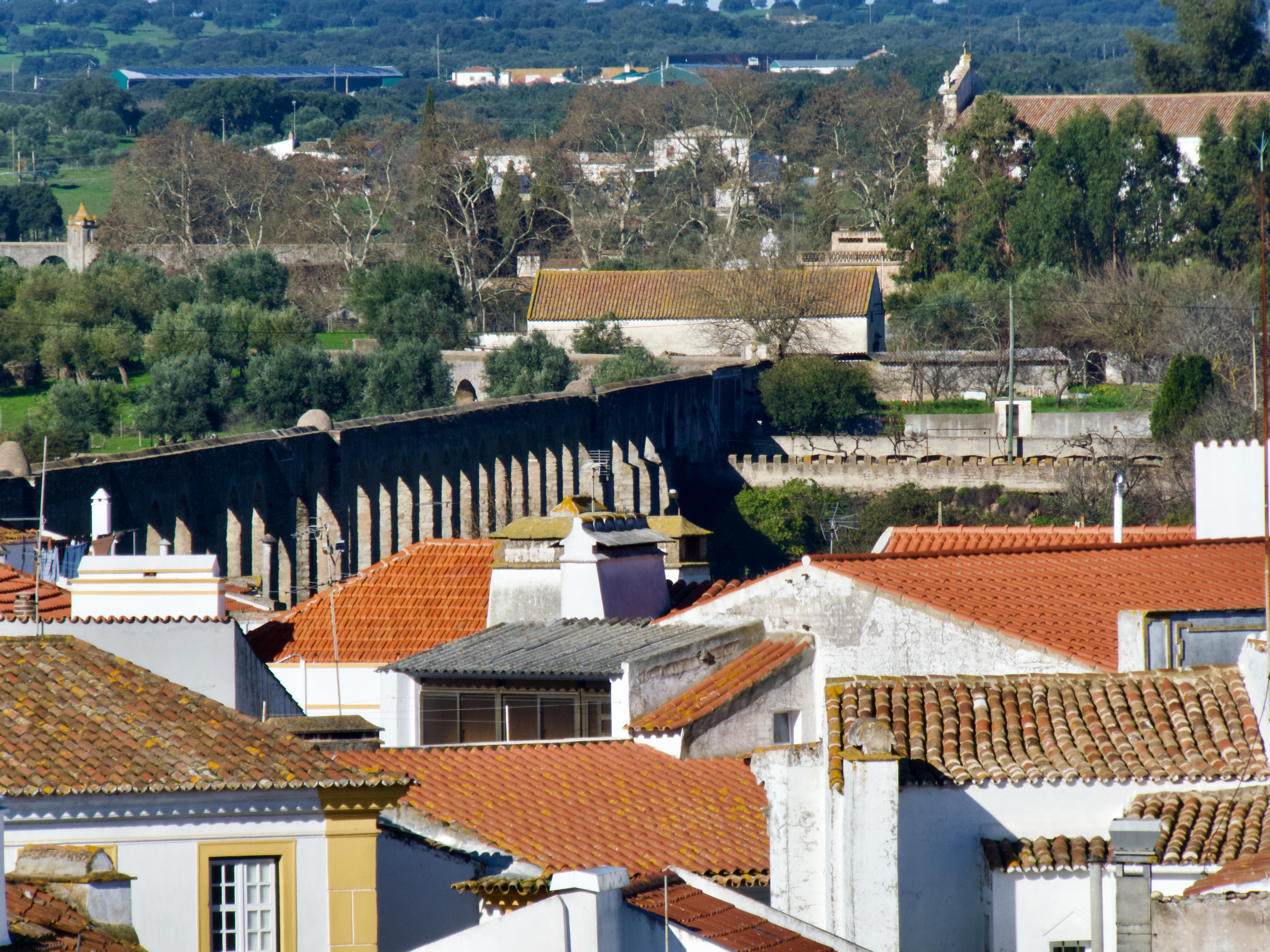
- The Àgua de Prata Aqueduct merging with the city of Évora
- Interactive map of Àgua de Prata Aqueduct
- Location: Évora, Alentejo, Portugal

Site notes
- Architect: Francisco de Arruda

Historic Centre of Évora
UNESCO World Heritage Site
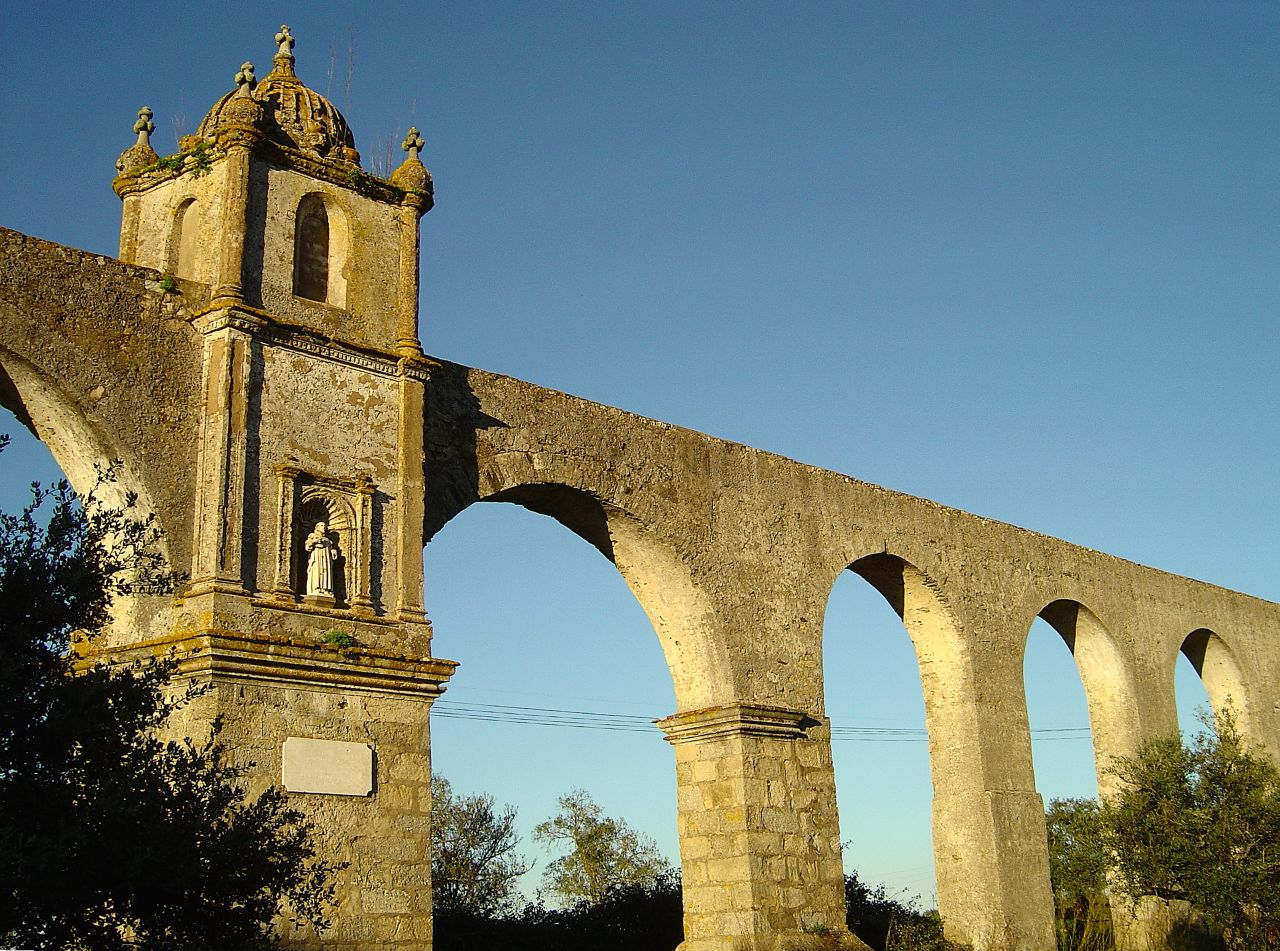
- Àgua de Prata Aqueduct
- Interactive map of Historic Centre of Évora
- Location: Evora
- Criteria: Cultural: ii, iv
- Reference: 361
- Inscription: 1986 (10th Session)
- Extensions

Portuguese National Monument
- Type: Non-movable
- Criteria: National Monument
- Designated: 16 June 1910
- Reference no.: IPA.00002755

The Aqueduct of Água de Prata (Portuguese: Aqueduto da Água de Prata), also known as the Évora Aqueduct, the Prata Aqueduct, and the Água de Prata Aqueduct, is a 16th-century water supply structure that brings water from springs northeast of Évora to the historic centre of the city in the Alentejo region of Portugal. The aqueduct is made of a linear series of arches and piping that is integrated into the city and has been protected as a national monument since 1910. The aqueduct is around 11 miles (18km) long.

== History ==
Construction of the aqueduct began in 1531—1532 at the order of King John III of Portugal and was directed by the royal architect Francisco de Arruda. The work followed and sometimes overlaid earlier Roman waterworks. The aqueduct was completed and inaugurated around in the 1530s, taking about 6 years to conclude construction, and was signified with a ceremonial arrival of water in Giraldo Square. Over time, the aqueduct has undergone various restorations, including major repairs in the 17th century during the Portuguese Restoration Wars, and smaller interventions in the 19th and 20th centuries that did not largely alter its overall design.

== Route and function ==
The aqueduct draws water from sources in the village of Divor (to the northeast of Évora) and carries it roughly 18km (about 11 miles) to the city. Its route crosses open the countryside and then enters the urban area, where the line of arches becomes a landmark and where the aqueduct historically fed a system of public fountains and cisterns throughout Évora. Examples of fountain termini associated with the system include points at Giraldo Square, Portas de Moura, Portas de Avis and Rossio de S. Brás.

== Architecture and engineering ==
The visible sections of the aqueduct are composed of granite arches supporting a covered channel that housed the piping and conduit. The Renaissance-style stonework, where the aqueduct starts traversing the city and arches form a colonnade that has been incorporated into streets, plots and buildings, is attributed to Francisco de Arruda. In the historic centre some additional elements were added, such as the Renaissance water box (a small edifice with Tuscan columns) and formerly a Renaissance gantry known as the Fecho Real do Aqueduto.

== Cultural significance ==
Because of its scale, historical role, and its integration with the city's built environment, the Aqueduct of Água de Prata is regarded as an important monument. It was classified as a Portuguese National Monument in 1910.

== Modern access and tourism ==
Large sections of the aqueduct remain standing and visible today; within the city the arches form an urban backdrop, and a neighbourhood at the aqueduct's terminus (around Rua do Cano) contains shops and cafés beneath and beside the arches. A marked walking and cycling route (Percurso da Água de Prata) follows much of the aqueduct for several kilometers through countryside and farmland. The aqueduct is a regular entry in travel guides and visitor resources for Évora.
