= Aqua Augusta =

Aqua Augusta may refer to two Roman aqueducts:

- Aqua Augusta (Naples) supplying the Bay of Naples
- Aqua Augusta (Rome) supplying Rome
