= Largo do Boticário =

Square in Rio de Janeiro, Brazil

Coordinates: 22.9395°S 43.2013°W

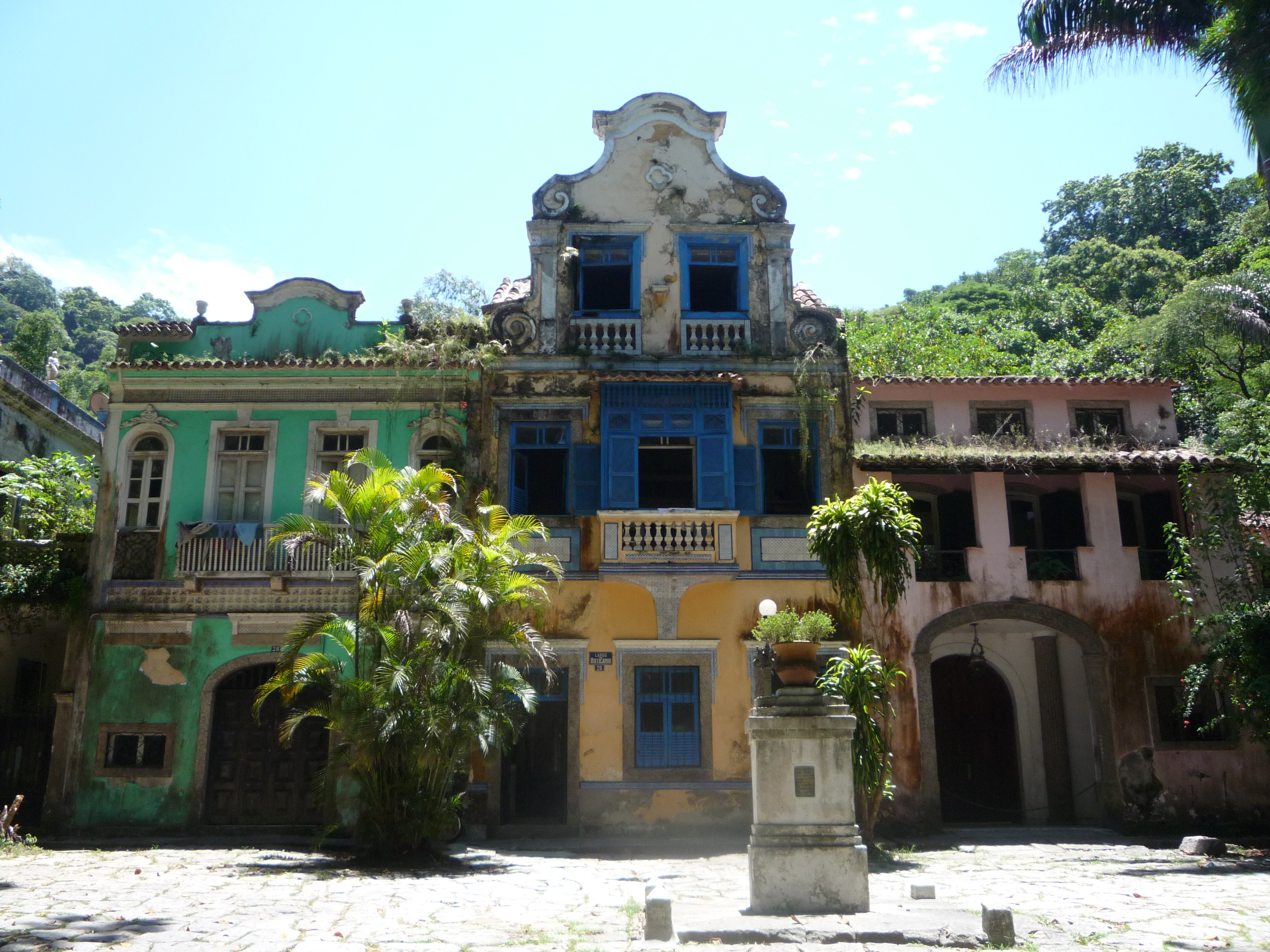
Largo do Boticário in 2010

The Largo do Boticário (Apothecary's Square) is a square in the Cosme Velho neighborhood of the city of Rio de Janeiro in Brazil. The square can be reached by the Beco do Boticário (Apothecary's Alley), that passes by the Carioca River. The area is characterized by large, neo-colonial houses and Atlantic Forest vegetation.

== History ==
The name of the alley and square are derived from Joaquim Luís da Silva Souto, apothecary, who had an establishment on the old Rua Direita, today's Rua Primeiro de Março in downtown Rio. Apothecary Silva Souto was very successful, even treating members of the royal family. He bought land in the Cosme Velho neighborhood and moved there around 1831. In 1846, marshal Joaquim Alberto de Souza Silveira—a frequent visitor to the royal court—lived there and author Machado de Assis was his godfather.

The defining feature of the square appeared in the 1920s. Edmundo Bittencourt, founder of the newspaper Correio da Manhã, bought the property and began to build neocolonial houses. This trend continued into the 1930s and 1940s with the help of diplomat, architect, art collector, and resident, Rodolfo da Siqueira. Sylvia de Arruda Botelho Bittencourt her husband Paulo inherited the Correio da Manhã, moved into the square, and assisted with its preservation. Some of the original houses near the square were refurbished by modernist architects like Lucio Costa and Gregori Warchavchik, using original materials authentic to the colonial era salvaged from demolition projects around the city.

== Present day ==
During its "golden age", the Largo do Boticário became filled with huge houses owned by well-known figures in Brazilian society and foreigners attracted by the parties and social events held by the neighborhood's illustrious residents. Currently, however, the once-decadent area has fallen into decay. Between 2006 and 2008, one of the houses was taken over by a group of homeless people.

The Largo do Boticário is one of the few places in the city from which one can see the Carioca River. Near the square, several other historic sites in the Cosme Velho neighborhood can be found, including the Solar de Abacaxis house and the Corcovado Railway. In the 1970s, the square was featured in a scene in the movie Moonraker.
