= Queen's Spout =

- Bica da Rainha
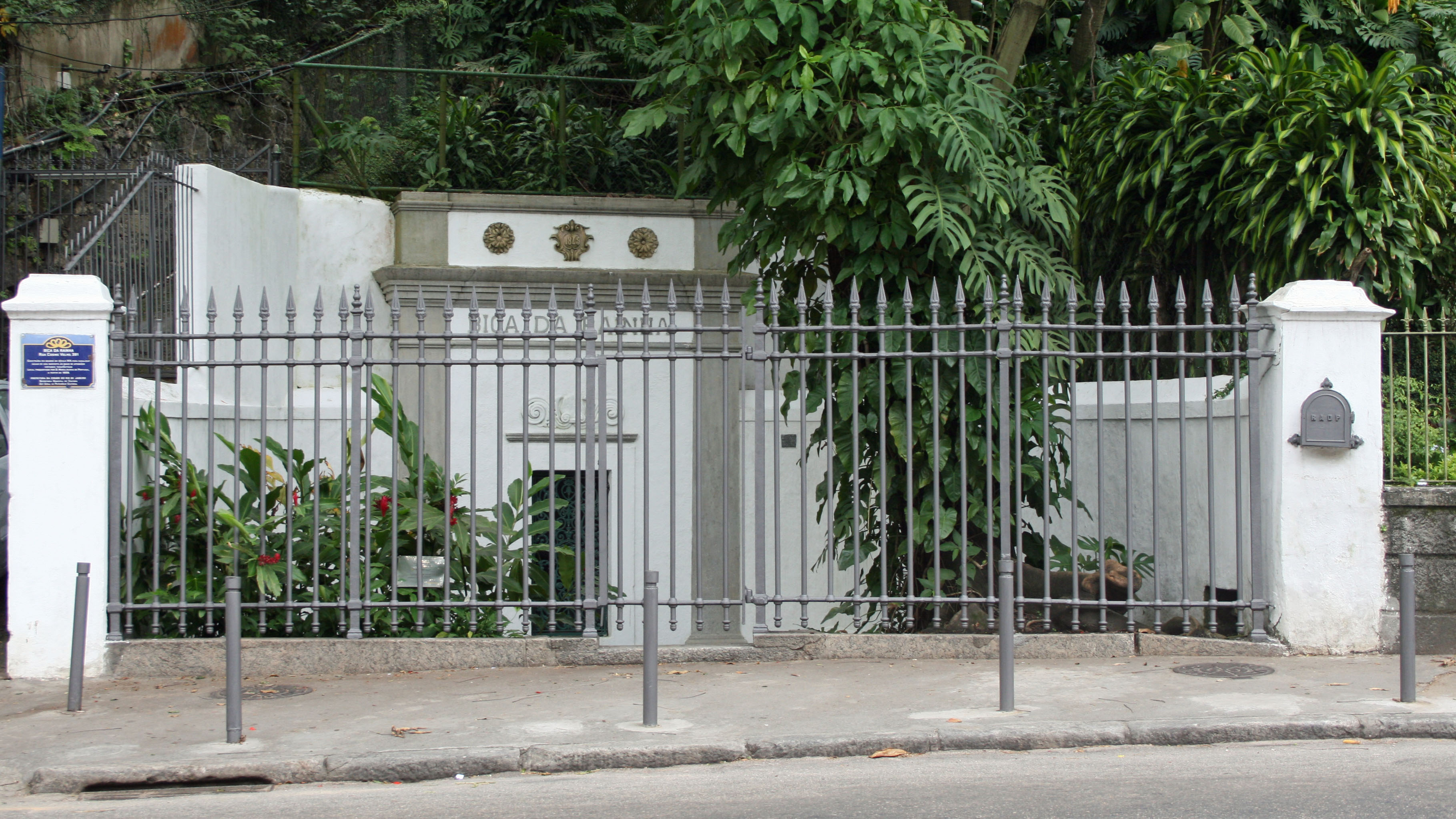
- .
- Location: Rio de Janeiro, Cosme Velho - Brazil
- Coordinates: 22°56′26.808″S 43°11′49.222″W
- Type: tourist attraction

The Queen's Fountain (Portuguese: Bica da Rainha) is a fountain located in the Cosme Velho neighborhood, in the South Zone of Rio de Janeiro, Brazil. It is situated on Cosme Velho Street, near the Cosme Velho Station of the Corcovado Train.

== History ==
The fountain was constructed in the 19th century to channel water from a nearby spring. It was named "Bica da Rainha" (Queen's Fountain) in honor of the visits by Queen Maria I of Portugal. The monument was listed as a historical heritage site by the National Institute of Historic and Artistic Heritage (IPHAN) in 1938.

Since the 18th century, the site has been visited by people who believed that the water had healing properties, such as curing anemia. This belief attracted the attention of Carlota Joaquina of Spain, who began frequenting the fountain. Carlota Joaquina reportedly recommended the place to her mother-in-law, Queen Maria I, who also started visiting the area. As a result, the locals began calling the fountain "Bica da Rainha" (Queen's Fountain).

In 2014, the Queen's Fountain underwent a restoration of its original landscape architecture project. The initiative, led by Bem Verde & Horta e Jardim, reconstituted the original garden with plants from the flora of Brazil.

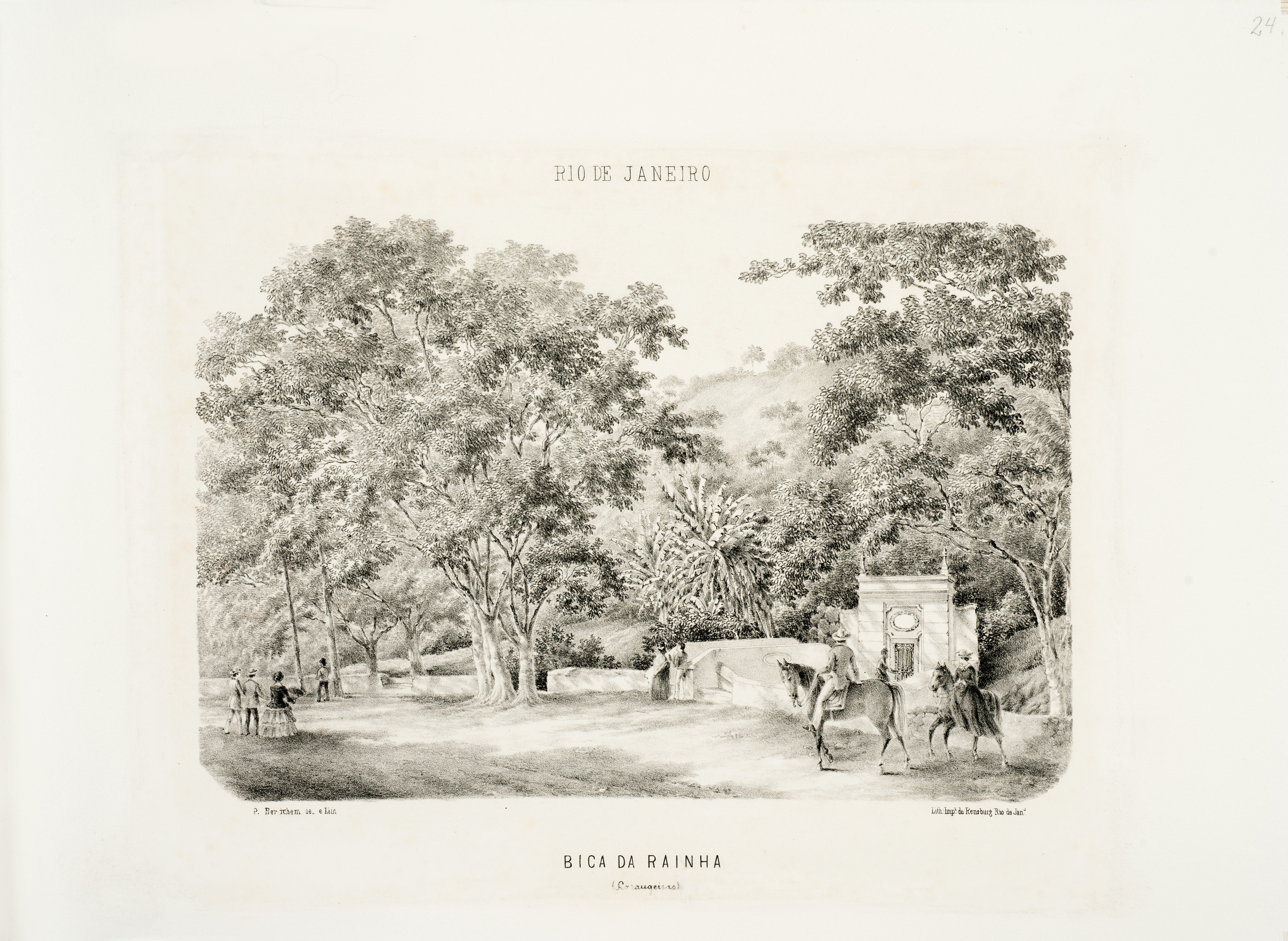
The Bica da Rainha in O Brasil Pitoresco e Monumental (1856)

== See also ==
- Cosme Velho
- Carlota Joaquina of Spain
- Maria I of Portugal
- National Institute of Historic and Artistic Heritage
