= Laranjeiras, Rio de Janeiro =

Laranjeiras
- Neighborhood
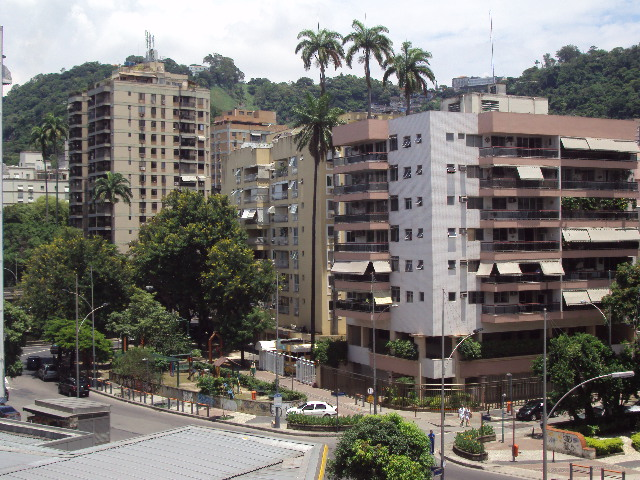

- Location in Rio de Janeiro Laranjeiras (Brazil)
- Coordinates: 22°56′09″S 43°11′20″W
- Country: Brazil
- State: Rio de Janeiro
- Municipality: Rio de Janeiro
- Zone: South Zone

Population (2022)
  - Total: 20,890

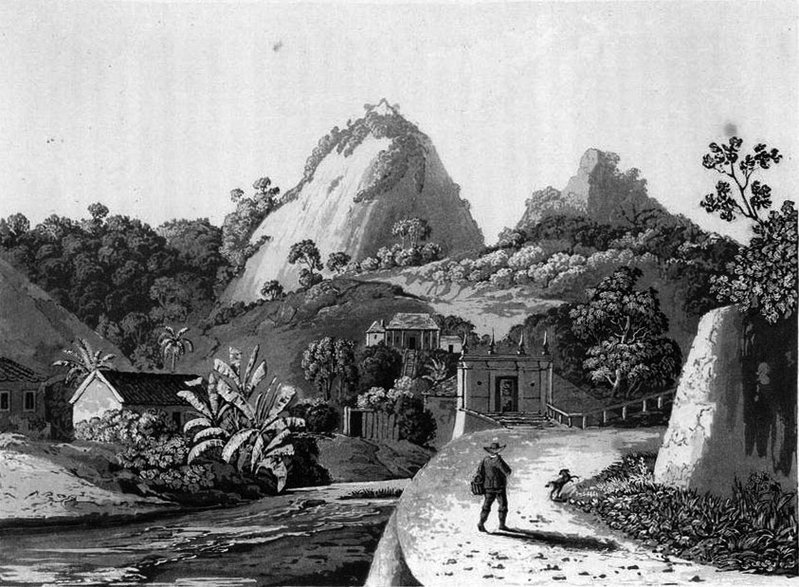
Laranjeiras in 1821. Drawing by pioneering travel author Maria Callcott in her book Journal of a Voyage to Brazil, and Residence There, During Part of the Years 1821, 1822, 1823.

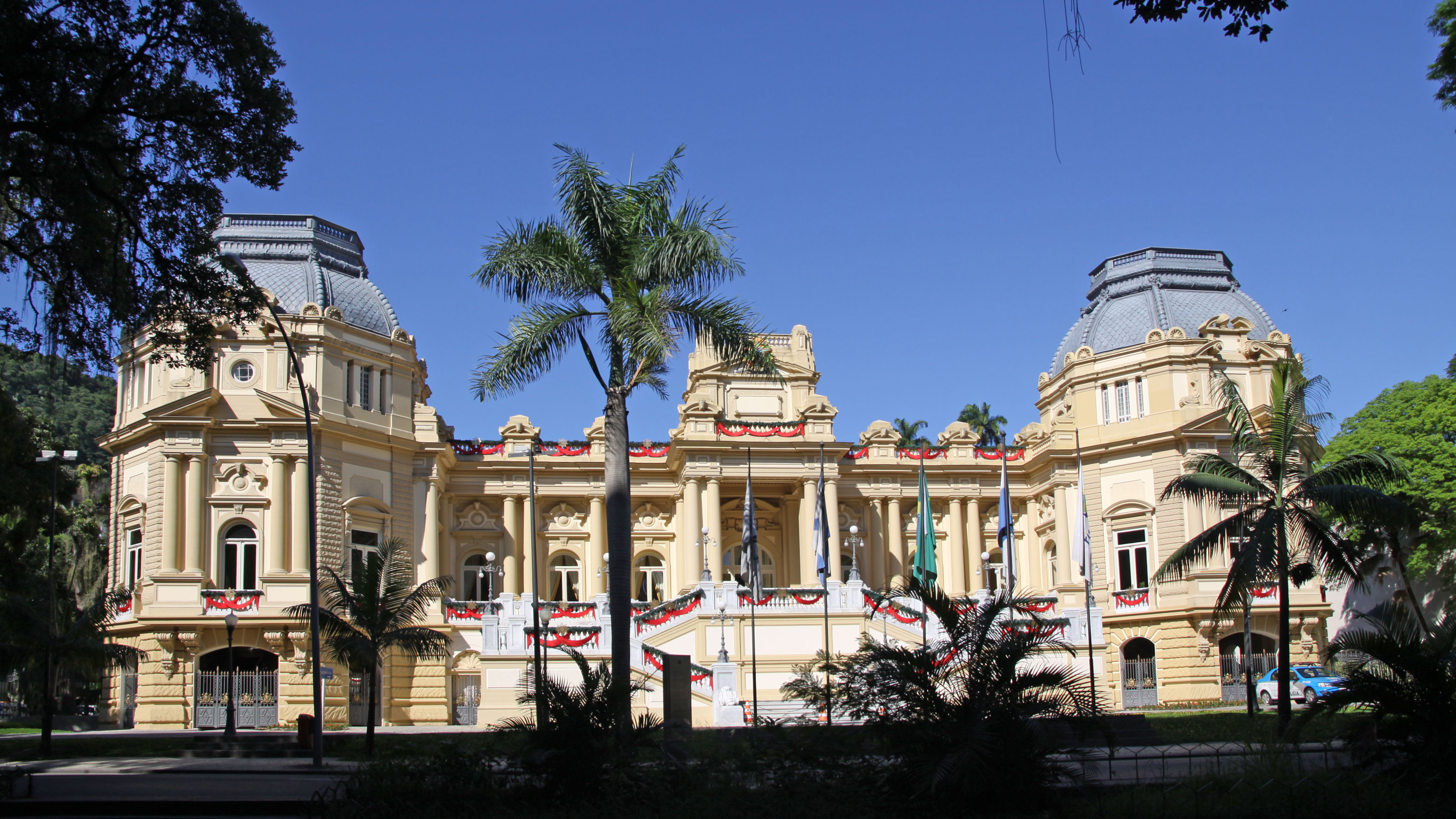
Palácio Guanabara, seat of government of the State of Rio de Janeiro

Laranjeiras (Portuguese pronunciation: [laɾɐ̃ˈʒejɾɐʃ], orange trees) is an upper-middle-class neighborhood located in the South Zone of Rio de Janeiro, Brazil. Primarily residential, it is one of the city's oldest neighborhoods, having been founded in the 17th century, with the construction of country houses in the valley located around the Carioca River, which bordered Corcovado Mountain. Because of this, the neighborhood was previously called Vale do Carioca, or Carioca Valley.

While it is primarily residential, several important governmental, cultural, and sports institutions and schools make this a bustling neighborhood. Well-known landmarks in Laranjeiras include the Guanabara Palace (seat of the state government of Rio de Janeiro), the Palácio Laranjeiras (official residence of the state's governor), and the Parque Guinle (Eduardo Guinle Park), as well as the headquarters and Laranjeiras Stadium of Fluminense Football Club, and Rio's branch of the Hebraica Social and Sports Club, and several others.

Laranjeiras is adjacent to the Cosme Velho, Catete, Flamengo and Botafogo Neighborhoods.

== Infrastructure ==
Laranjeiras' main streets (ruas) are:

- Rua das Laranjeiras
- Rua Conde de Baependi
- Rua Pinheiro Machado
- Rua General Glicério
- Rua Pereira da Silva
- Rua Alice
- Rua São Salvador
- Rua Gago Coutinho
- Rua Mário Portela
- Rua Sebastião Lacerda
- Rua Cardoso Júnior
- Rua Pires de Almeida.
- Rua Ipiranga
- Rua Soares Cabral
- Rua Almirante Benjamin Sodré
- Rua Álvaro Chaves
- Rua Moura Brasil

== People ==
Well-known people that live or have lived in Laranjeiras include:

- Cartola (Angenor de Oliveira), singer, composer and poet
- Cássia Eller, singer
- Machado de Assis, writer
- Mel Lisboa, actress
- Arlindo Lopes, actor
- Paulo Gracindo, actor
- Heráclito Fontoura Sobral Pinto, human rights lawyer
- Oscar Niemeyer, architect
- Adriana Lisboa, author
- Carola Saavedra, author

== Events ==
General Glicério Fair:

The fair takes place every Saturday morning at General Glicério street. It is a traditional event for the residents of the neighborhood, where you can find fresh fruits and fishes, as well as the favorite Brazilian fair food, sugarcane juice and "pastel" (fried pie). Families and friends can also enjoy great Choro music or "Chorinho", an instrumental Brazilian popular music genre which originated in 19th century Rio de Janeiro.

== Education ==
The Lycée Molière de Rio de Janeiro or Liceu Molière, the French international school, is in this neighborhood.
