= Carioca River =

River in Brazil

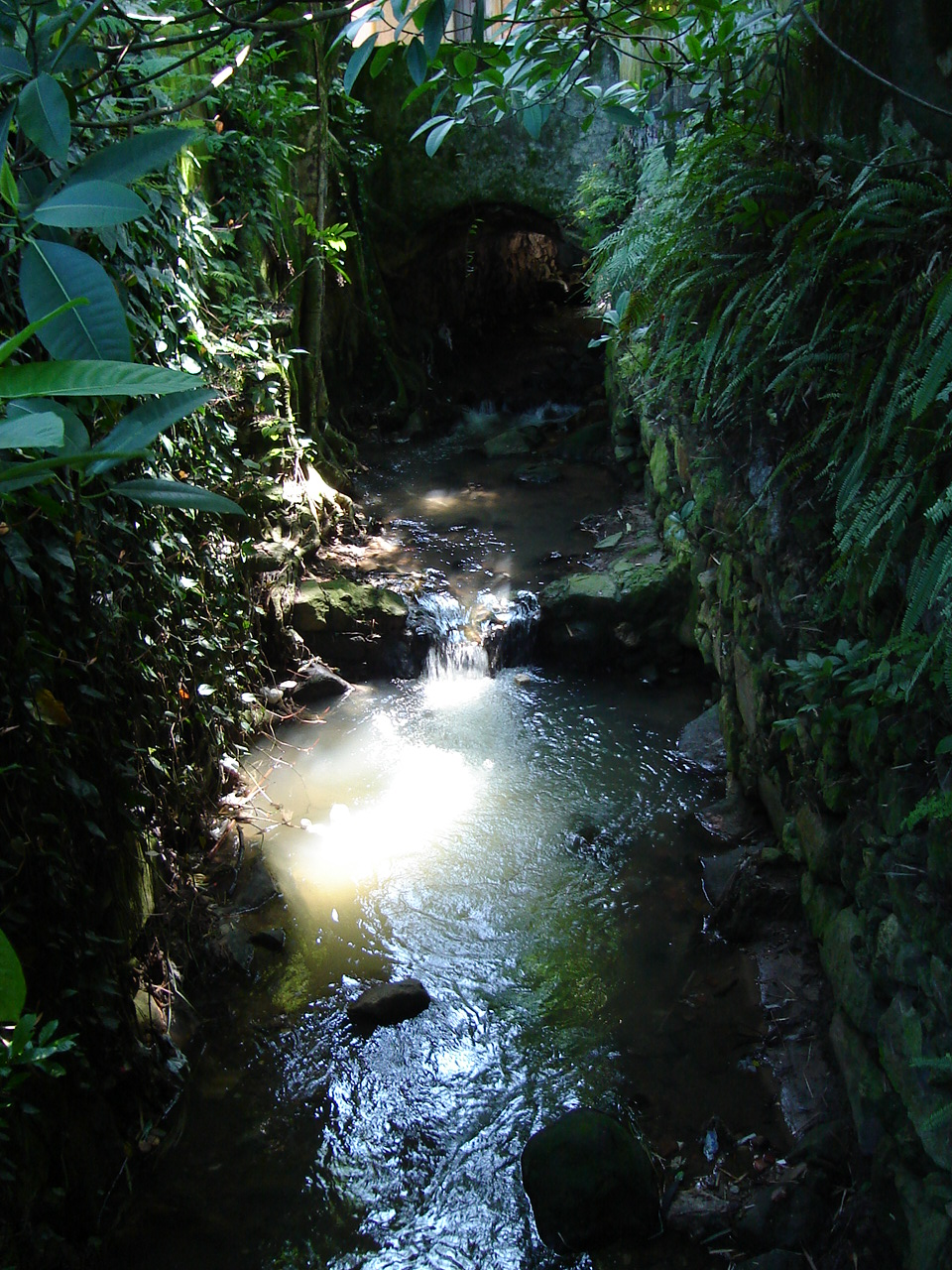
- Carioca River (Rio Carioca) in the Cosme Velho neighbourhood, Rio de Janeiro

Location
- Country: Brazil

Physical characteristics
- Source
  - location: Tijuca Forest in Cosme Velho, Laranjeiras, and Catete of Rio de Janeiro
- Mouth: Atlantic Ocean
  - location: Flamengo, Rio de Janeiro
  - coordinates: 22°56′S 43°12′W

The Carioca River (Portuguese: Rio Carioca) is a river in the state of Rio de Janeiro state in southeastern Brazil. It emerges from two springs on the southeast slopes of the Tijuca Massif in the protected Mata Atlantica forest of Tijuca National Park. The river then leaves Tijuca Forest into the Guararapes favela, then into the high-income Cosme Velho neighborhood, and then it is buried completely underground. The river reemergess in Flamengo Park to empty into Guanabara Bay at Flamengo Beach.

Research by the Fundação SOS Mata Atlântica in 2015 confirmed that every river in the City of Rio de Janeiro is polluted, including the Carioca River. The river, once the primary source of fresh water in the city, is now one of its most polluted. Untreated sewage is the primary source of pollution of the Carioca; the 7 kilometres (4.3 mi) stretch of the river in Guararapes and Cosme Velho are a great sources of unregulated sewage. The water of the Carioca carries pollutants that cause diarrhea, hepatitis, and leptospirosis. The river has a single wastewater treatment facility near its mouth before emptying into Guanabara Bay. It was installed by the State of Rio de Janeiro in 2001. Biochemical evaluation of the river began in 1991 and water quality decreases annually.

== See also ==
- List of rivers of Rio de Janeiro
