= Sylvia de Arruda Botelho Bittencourt =

Sylvia de Arruda Botelho Bittencourt (June 12, 1896 — January 30, 1995), also known as Majoy, was a Brazilian journalist who worked as a war correspondent in Europe during World War II. In 1941, she became the first woman to receive the Maria Moors Cabot Prize.

== Early life and education ==
Sylvia de Arruda Botelho was born in 1896 in Paris, where her father, Martinho Carlos de Arruda Botelho, was working as editor of the magazine Revista Moderna. Her grandfather was Antônio Carlos de Arruda Botelho, founder of the Brazilian city of São Carlos. Due to the poor health of her mother, Alexandra de Markoff, Sylvia was brought to Brazil as a child and raised by her uncle and aunt Antonio Moreira de Barros and Carlota Moreira de Barros. She studied at the Colégio Des Oiseaux, a girls' school in São Paulo.

== Career ==
Under the pseudonym "Majoy," she began writing a daily column for the Correio da Manhã newspaper in Rio de Janeiro, which was directed by her then-husband Paulo Bittencourt. She wrote in favor of civic improvement in Rio, as well as women's rights and other causes. For this work, in 1941 she received the Maria Moors Cabot Prize, becoming the first woman to do so.

During World War II, Bittencourt served as a war correspondent, covering the efforts of the Brazilian Expeditionary Force. When Brazil entered the European Theater, she was already in Italy, working alongside Paulo. She covered the war for both the Correio da Manhã and other outlets, including United Press International and the BBC. She traveled through North Africa, Greece, and beyond, including visiting the concentration camp at Dachau and attending the Nuremberg trials, and interviewed important subjects such as Charles de Gaulle.

Bittencourt's work in this period was marked by its blend of war reporting and travel writing. Among the Brazilian press corps covering the war, she was the only woman. At one point she was injured by shrapnel from a bomb, and recovered in a Red Cross hospital in Capri.

In 1951, her reporting was collected in the book Seguindo a Primavera ("Following Springtime").

== Return to Brazil and later years ==
Bittencourt was also known for her residence in the Largo do Boticário, an architecturally significant area of Rio de Janeiro that she worked to help preserve. In her later years, she wrote a few literary works, including the 1982 children's book O livro de Ana Carolina.

She died in 1995, in her house in Largo do Boticário.
