= Cosme Velho =

Neighborhood in the South Zone of Rio de Janeiro, Brazil

- Neighborhood
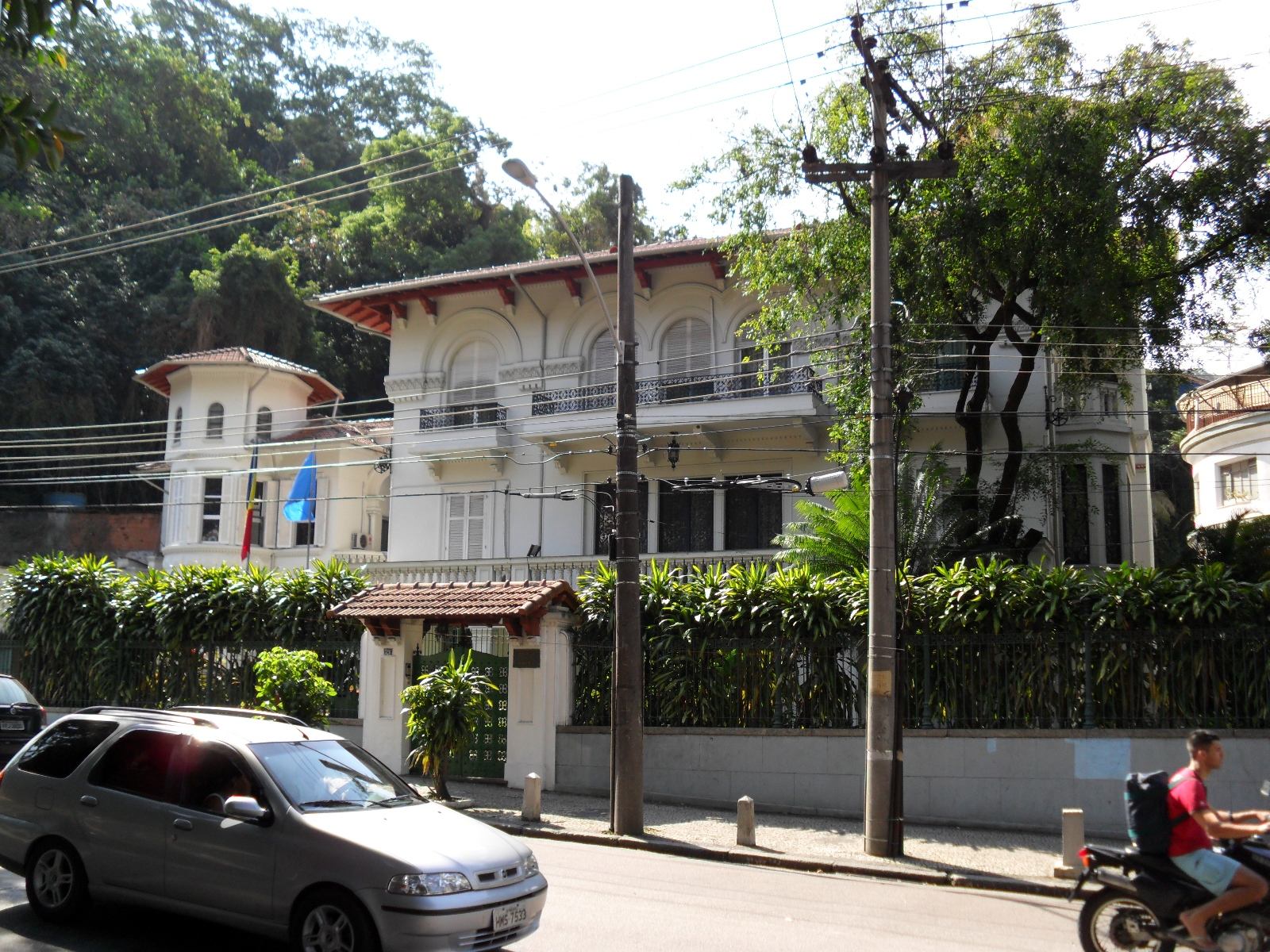

- Location in Rio de Janeiro Cosme Velho (Brazil)
- Coordinates: 22°56′34″S 43°12′00″W
- Country: Brazil
- State: Rio de Janeiro
- Municipality: Rio de Janeiro
- Zone: South Zone

Cosme Velho is a neighborhood in the South Zone of Rio de Janeiro, adjacent to Laranjeiras. Its main street is Rua Cosme Velho, an extension of Rua das Laranjeiras. Cosme Velho is frequently visited by tourists.

The Estação de Ferro do Corcovado (terminus of the Corcovado Rack Railway) is located here. Trains carry passengers from there to the summit of Corcovado Mountain and the statue of Christ the Redeemer.

The neighbourhood also includes the picturesque Largo do Boticário, which consists of a small square enclosed by several neocolonial-style houses, built in the 1920s. The houses were constructed using materials from much older buildings in the city's Centro district which had been demolished. There are two houses from the first half of the 19th century at the entrance to the square.

The writer Joaquim Maria Machado de Assis lived in a house at 18 Rua Cosme Velho from 1883 until his death in 1908. Machado acquired the nickname "Bruxo do Cosme Velho" ("Wizard of Cosme Velho"), supposedly because he was in the habit of burning his discarded documents in a cauldron. The house has since been demolished and an apartment block has been built in its place.

== Education ==
The Associação Civil de Divulgação Cultural e Educacional Japonesa do Rio de Janeiro ("Civil Association of Japanese Educational and Cultural Dissemination of Rio de Janeiro", known in Japanese as the "Rio de Janeiro Japanese School"), a Japanese international day school, is located in Cosme Velho.

== Population ==
The neighborhood's population is composed of middle-class, upper-middle-class, and upper-class residents.

=== Notable Residents and Former Residents ===
The most distinguished resident of Cosme Velho was the writer Machado de Assis, who earned the epithet "Wizard of Cosme Velho" (Bruxo do Cosme Velho). His former home no longer stands, having been demolished to make way for a residential building.

Other notable figures who have resided in the neighborhood include Roberta Close, Manuel Bandeira, Euclides da Cunha, Austregésilo de Athayde, Alceu Amoroso Lima, Cecília Meireles, Marcos Carneiro de Mendonça, Jorge Mautner, Roberto Marinho, Cássia Eller, Cândido Portinari and numerous other writers and historical figures.
