= Corcovado =

Mountain in Rio de Janeiro, home to Christ the Redeemer

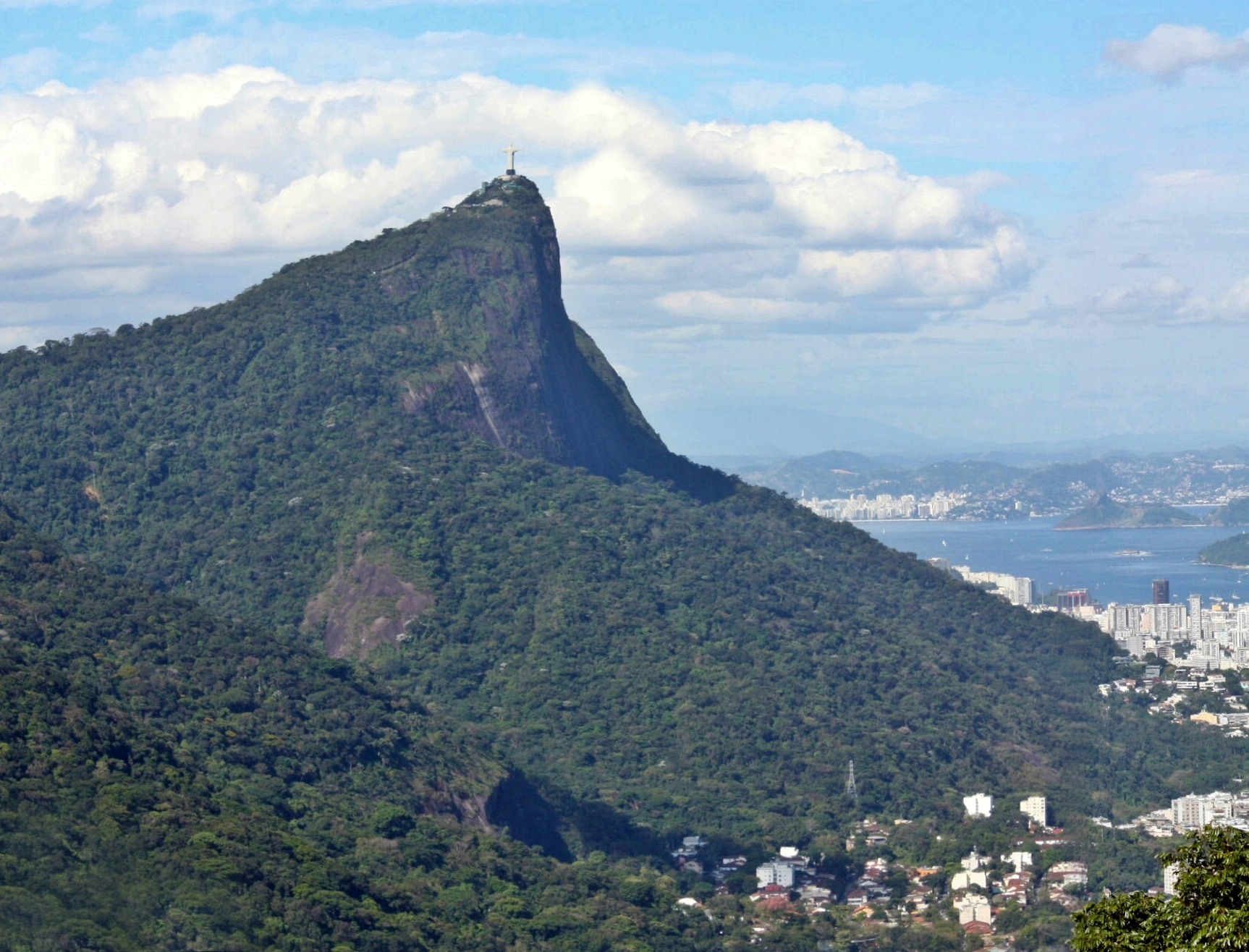
- View of Corcovado, with Christ the Redeemer, looking north

Highest point
- Coordinates: 22°57′8.7″S 43°12′42″W

Naming
- English translation: Hunchback
- Language of name: Portuguese

Geography
- Location within Brazil
- Location: Rio de Janeiro, Brazil

Geology
- Mountain type: Granite

Corcovado (Brazilian Portuguese pronunciation: [koʁkoˈvadu]; meaning "Hunchback") is a mountain in central Rio de Janeiro, Brazil. It is a 710-metre (2,330-foot) granite peak located in the Tijuca Forest, a national park.

Corcovado hill lies just west of the city center but is wholly within the city limits and visible from great distances. It is known worldwide for the statue of Jesus atop its peak, entitled Christ the Redeemer.

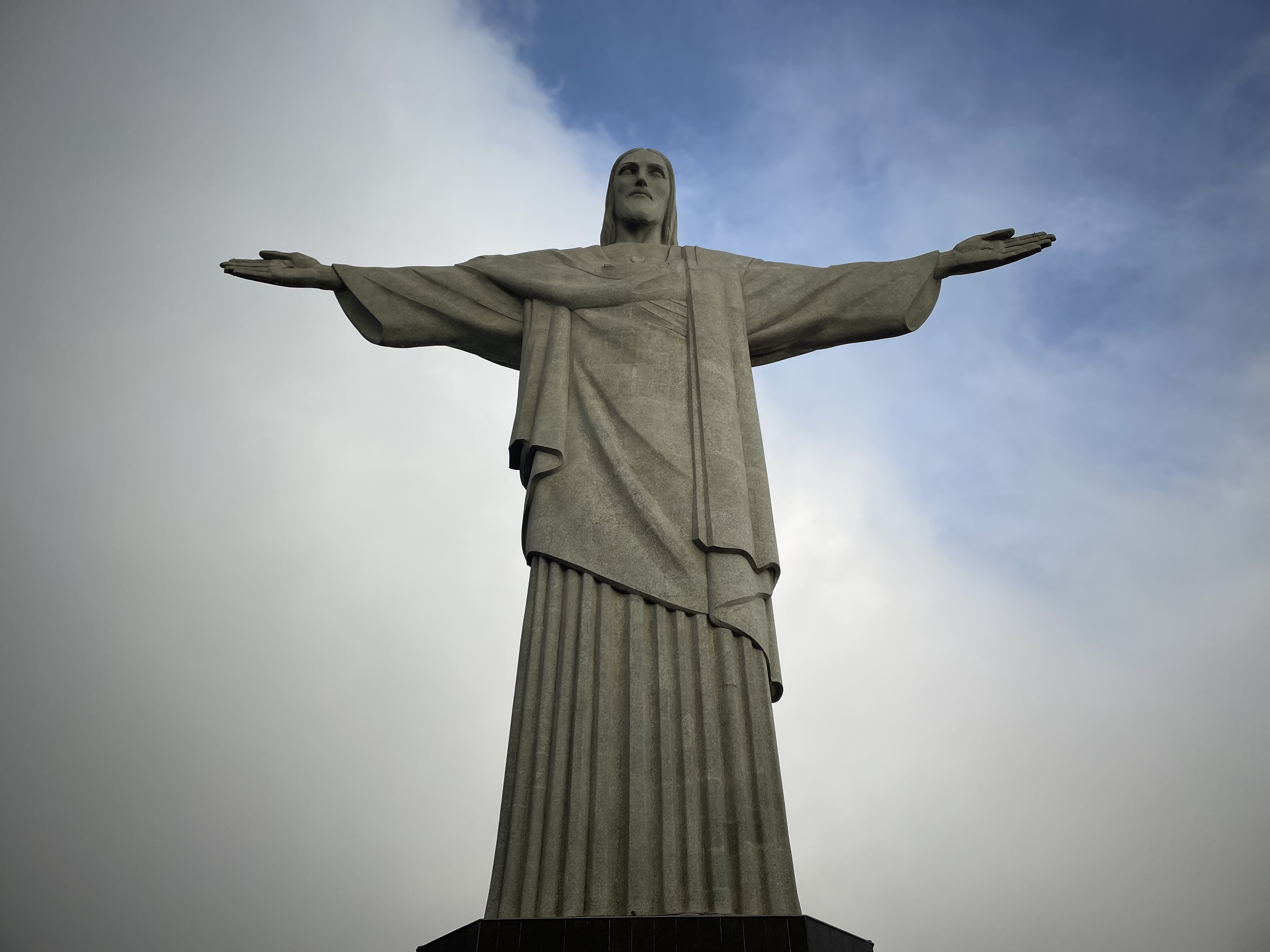
Christ the Redeemer in 2026

== Access ==
The peak and statue can be reached via a narrow road, by the 3.8 km (2.4 mi) Corcovado Rack Railway, which was opened in 1884 and refurbished in 1980, or by the walking trail on the south side of the mountain that starts from Parque Lage. The railway uses three electrically powered trains, with a capacity of 540 passengers per hour. The rail trip takes approximately 20 minutes and departs every 20 minutes. Due to its limited passenger capacity, the wait to board at the entry station can take several hours. The year-round schedule is 8:30 to 18:30.

From the train terminus and road, the observation deck at the foot of the statue is reached by 223 steps, or by elevators and escalators. Among the most popular year-round tourist attractions in Rio de Janeiro, the Corcovado railway, access roads, and statue platform are commonly crowded.

== Attractions ==
Corcovado's most popular attraction is the 38-metre (125 ft) statue depicting Jesus at its peak, entitled Christ the Redeemer (Portuguese: Cristo Redentor), and the viewing platform at its peak, drawing over 300,000 visitors per year. The statue was constructed from 1922 to 1931. From the peak's platform the panoramic view includes downtown Rio de Janeiro, Sugarloaf Mountain, the Rodrigo de Freitas lagoon, Copacabana and Ipanema beaches, Maracanã Stadium, and several of Rio de Janeiro's favelas. Cloud cover is common in Rio and the view from the platform is often obscured. Sunny days are recommended for optimal viewing.

Notable past visitors to the mountain peak include Charles Darwin, Pope Pius XII, Pope John Paul II, Alberto Santos-Dumont, Albert Einstein, Diana, Princess of Wales, General Sherman, and Karl Pilkington. An additional attraction of the mountain is rock climbing. The south face had 54 climbing routes in 1992. The easiest way starts from Parque Lage.

== Geology ==
The peak of Corcovado is a big granite dome, which describes a generally vertical rocky formation. It is claimed to be the highest such formation in Brazil, the second highest being Pedra Agulha, situated near the town of Pancas in Espírito Santo.

== References in Brazilian culture ==
Corcovado is considered an icon of Brazilian culture. "Corcovado" is a 1960 bossa nova song and jazz standard by Antônio Carlos Jobim whose lyrics draw on images of the hill. Corcovado has also been referenced in other artistic works (e.g. the lyrics of Ben Harper, literary works, films, etc.).

== Gallery ==
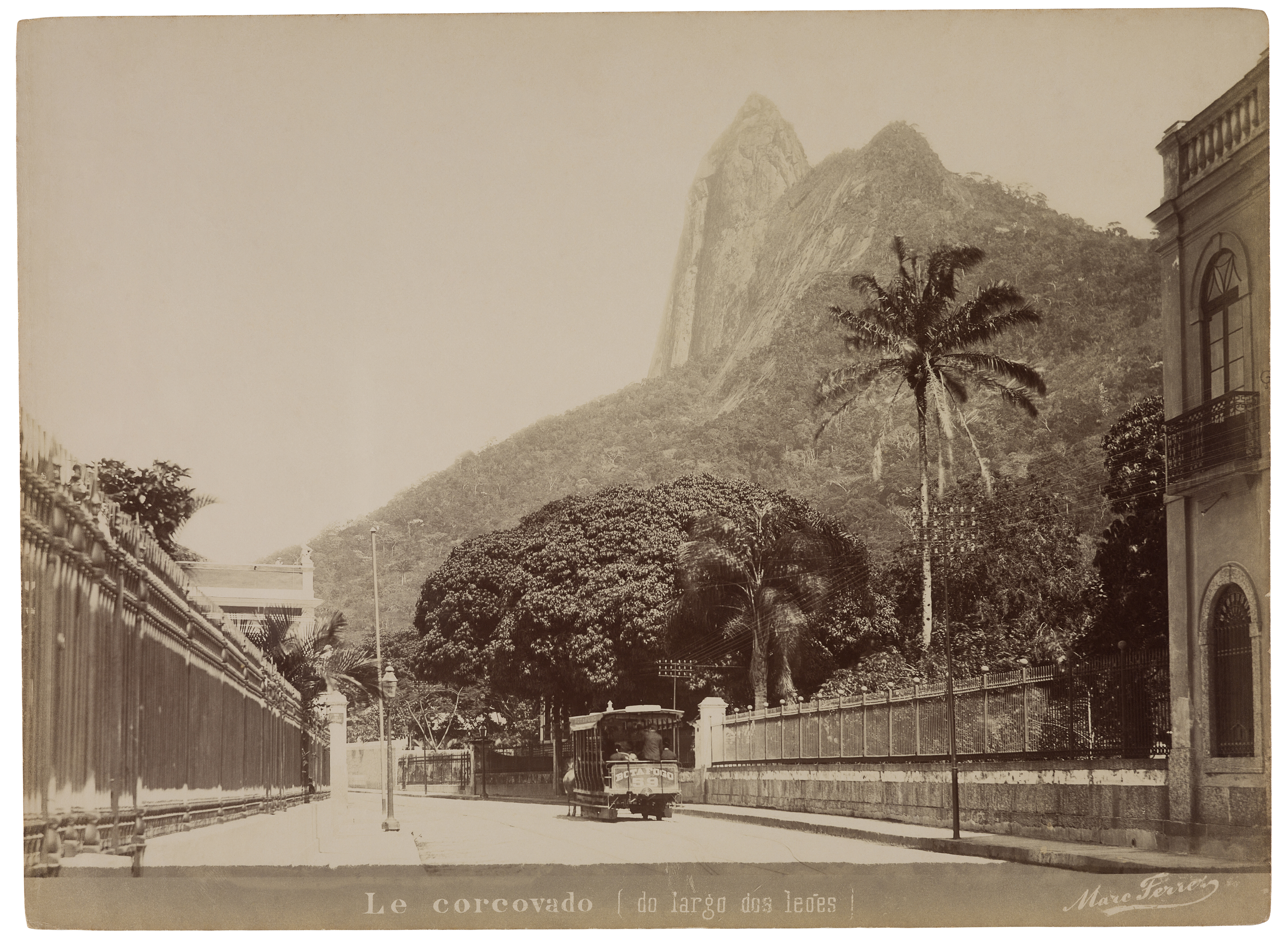
Corcovado before the construction of Christ the Redeemer, 19th century

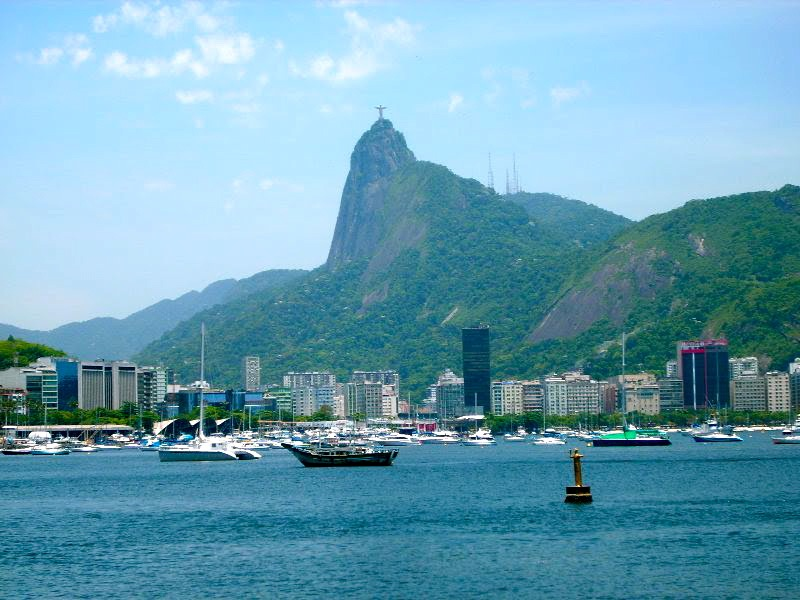
Corcovado seen from Urca

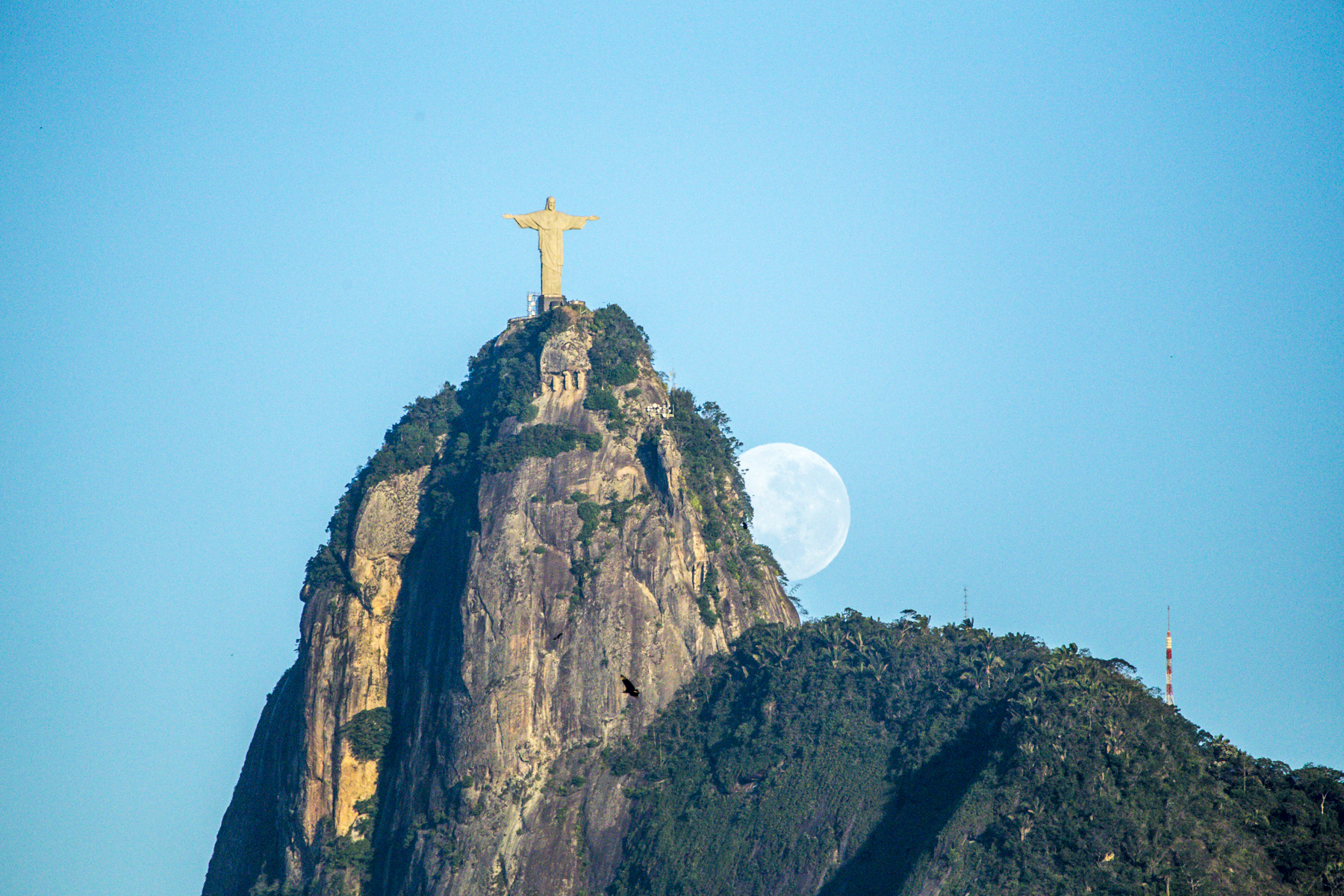
The statue of Christ the Redeemer atop Corcovado

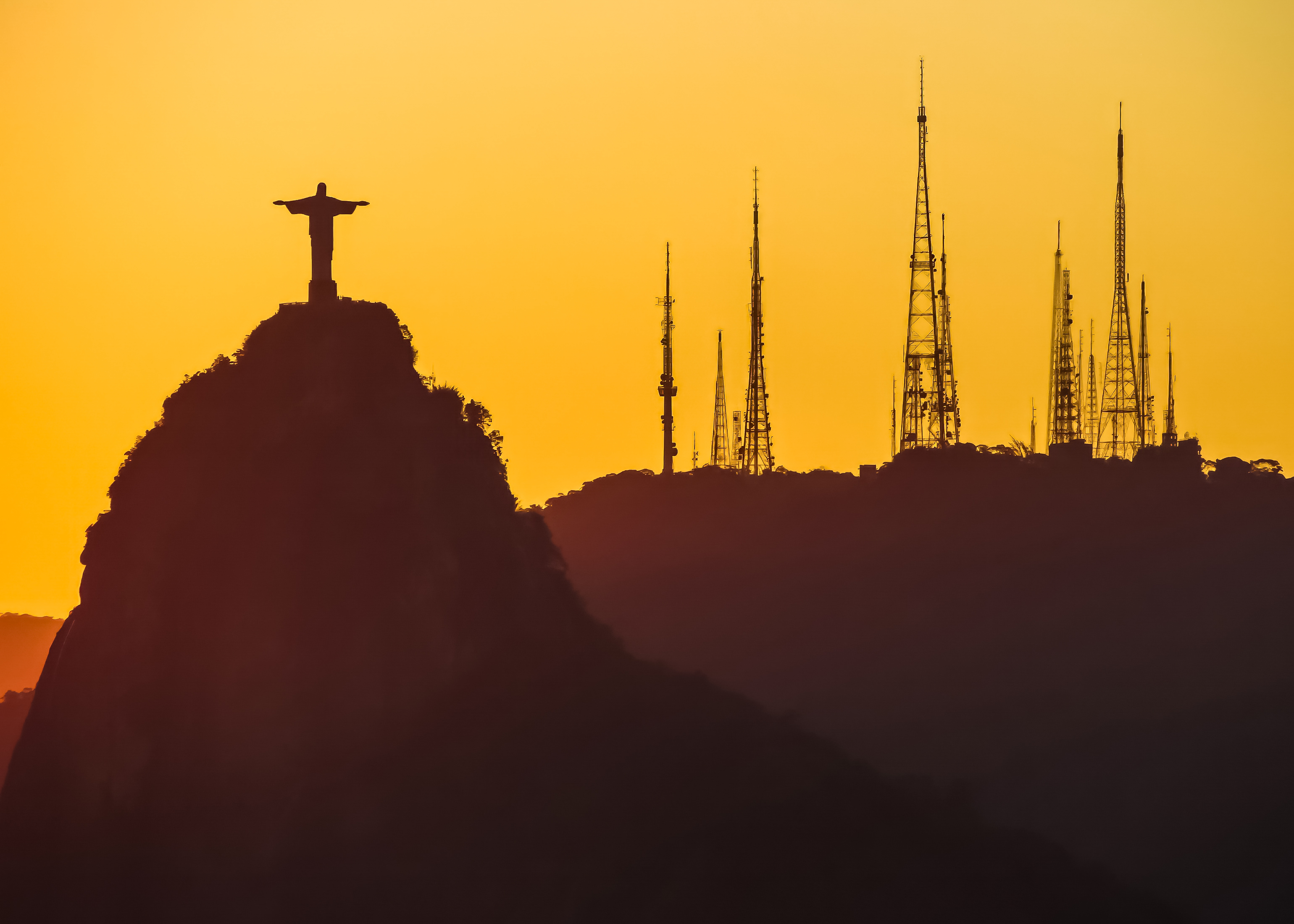
Corcovado seen from Sugarloaf Mountain during sunset

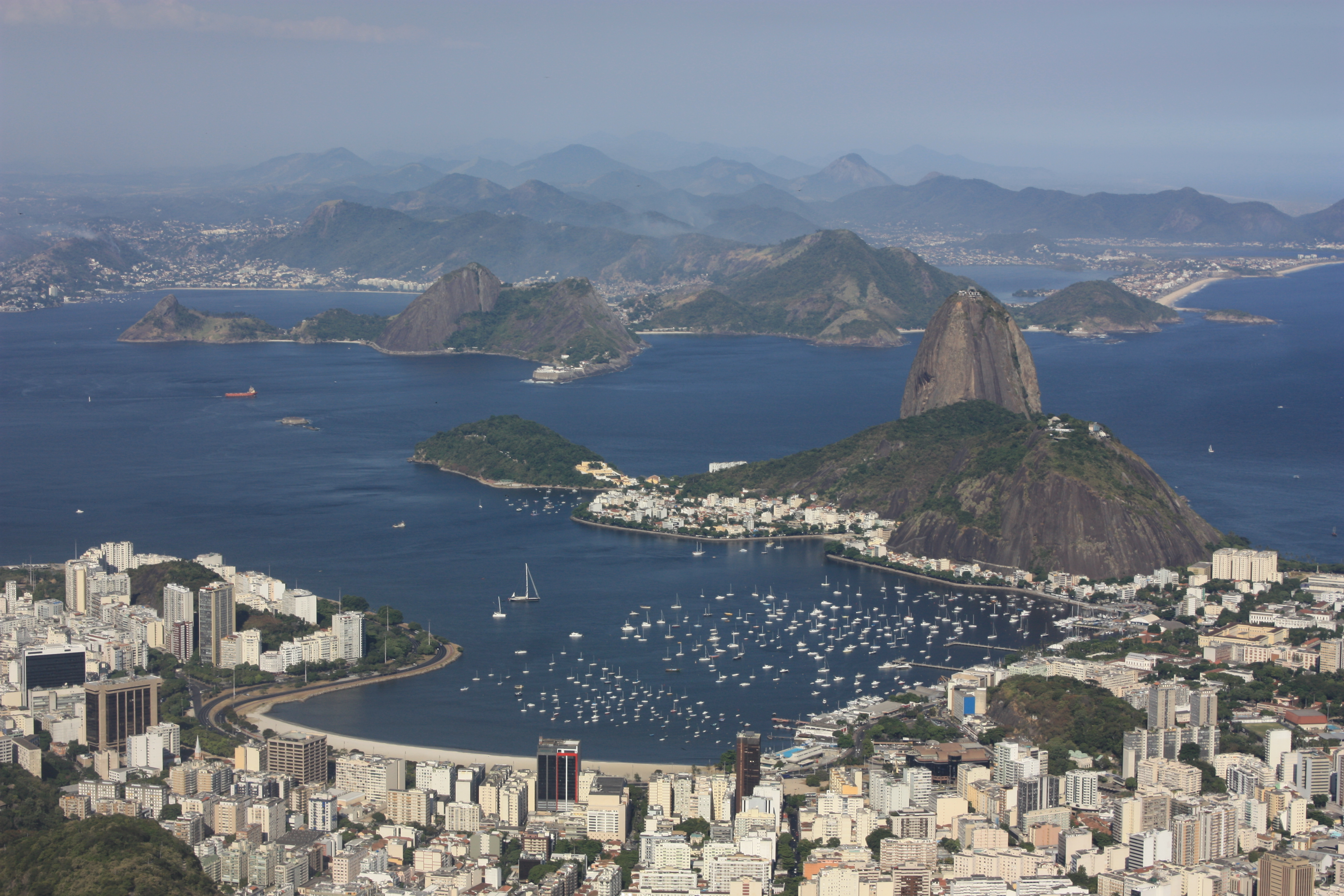
Botafogo bay seen from Corcovado

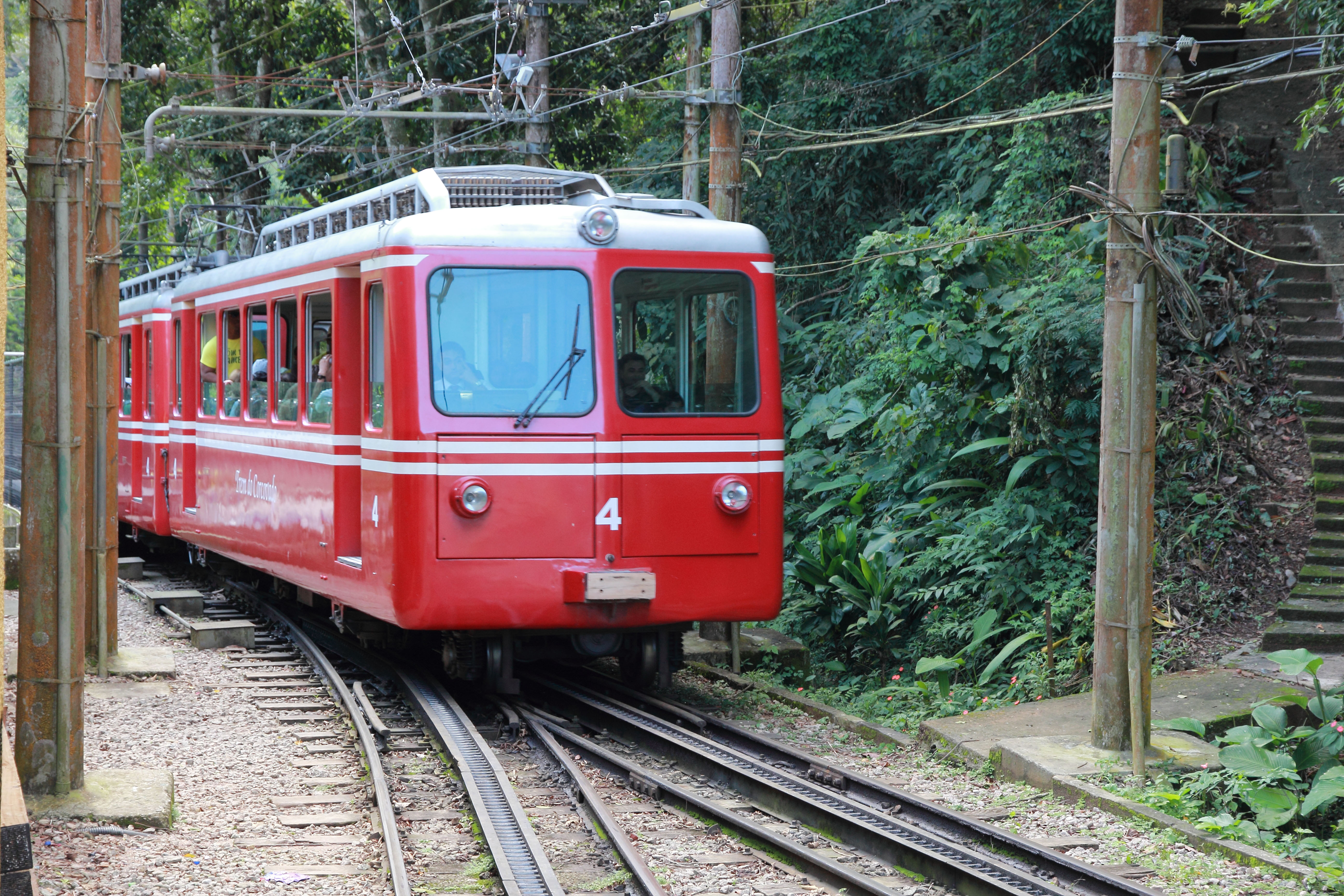
Corcovado Rack Railway
