= Corcovado Rack Railway =

Railway line in Rio de Janeiro, Brazil

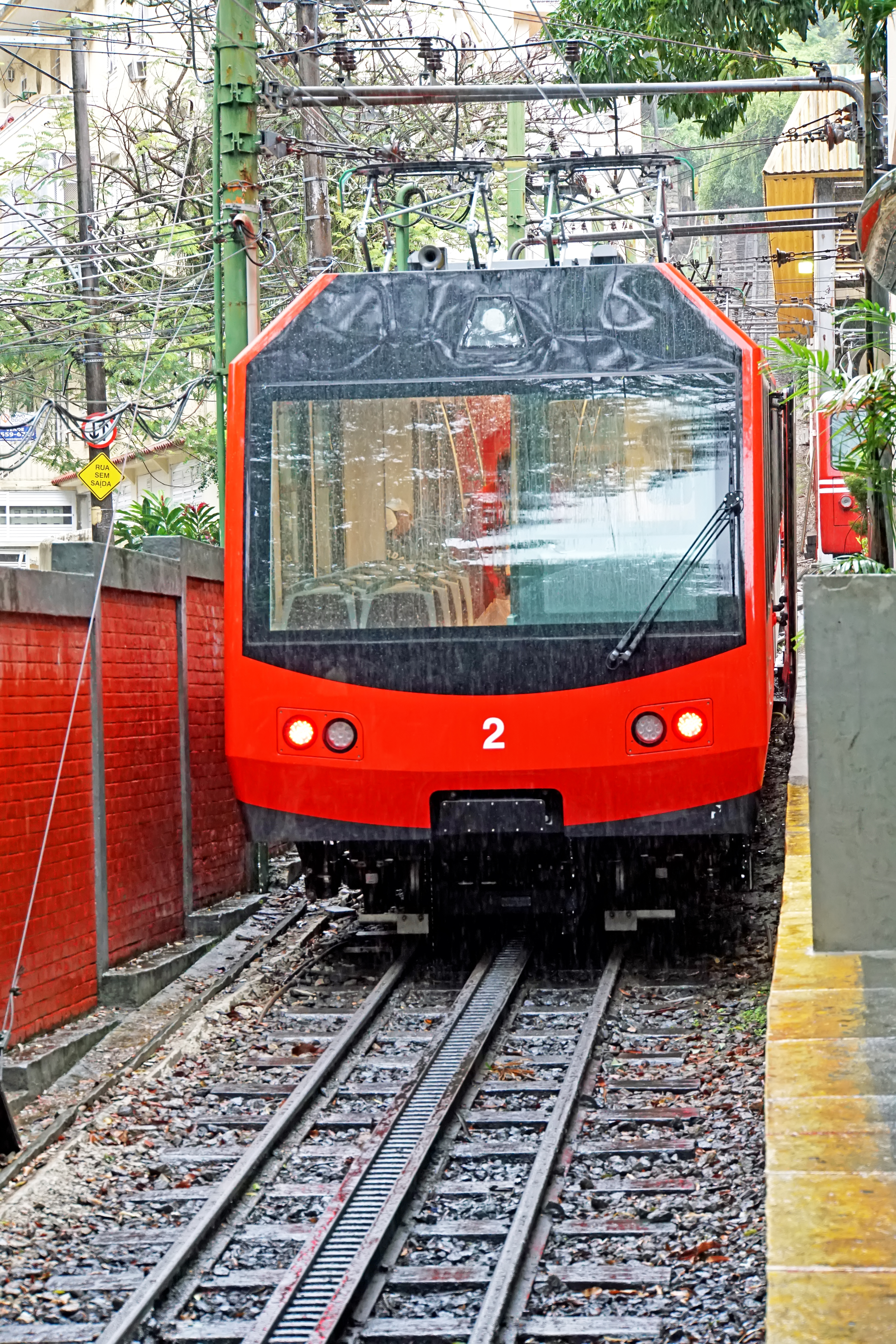
- A Stadler train, photographed in 2019

Overview
- Status: Operating
- Owner: Government of Brazil; ICMBio
- Locale: Rio de Janeiro, Brazil
- Termini: Cosme Velho 22.9408°S 43.1985°W; Corcovado 22.9517°S 43.2112°W
- Stations: 4 active 1 closed

Service
- Type: Rack railway
- Operator(s): Esfeco

History
- Opened: 10 July 1884; 141 years ago

Technical
- Line length: 3.8 km (2.36 mi)
- Rack system: Riggenbach
- Track gauge: 1,000 mm (3 ft 3 3/8 in) metre gauge
- Minimum radius: 100 m (330 ft)
- Electrification: Two three-phase 900 V AC 60 Hz overhead wires
- Operating speed: 25 km/h (16 mph)
- Highest elevation: 670 m (2,198 ft)
- Maximum incline: 300‰

The Corcovado Rack Railway (Portuguese: Trem do Corcovado) is a mountain rack railway in Rio de Janeiro, Brazil, from Cosme Velho to the summit of Corcovado at an elevation of 710 m (2,329 ft). The summit is famous for its giant statue of Christ the Redeemer and for its views over the city and beaches.

== History ==
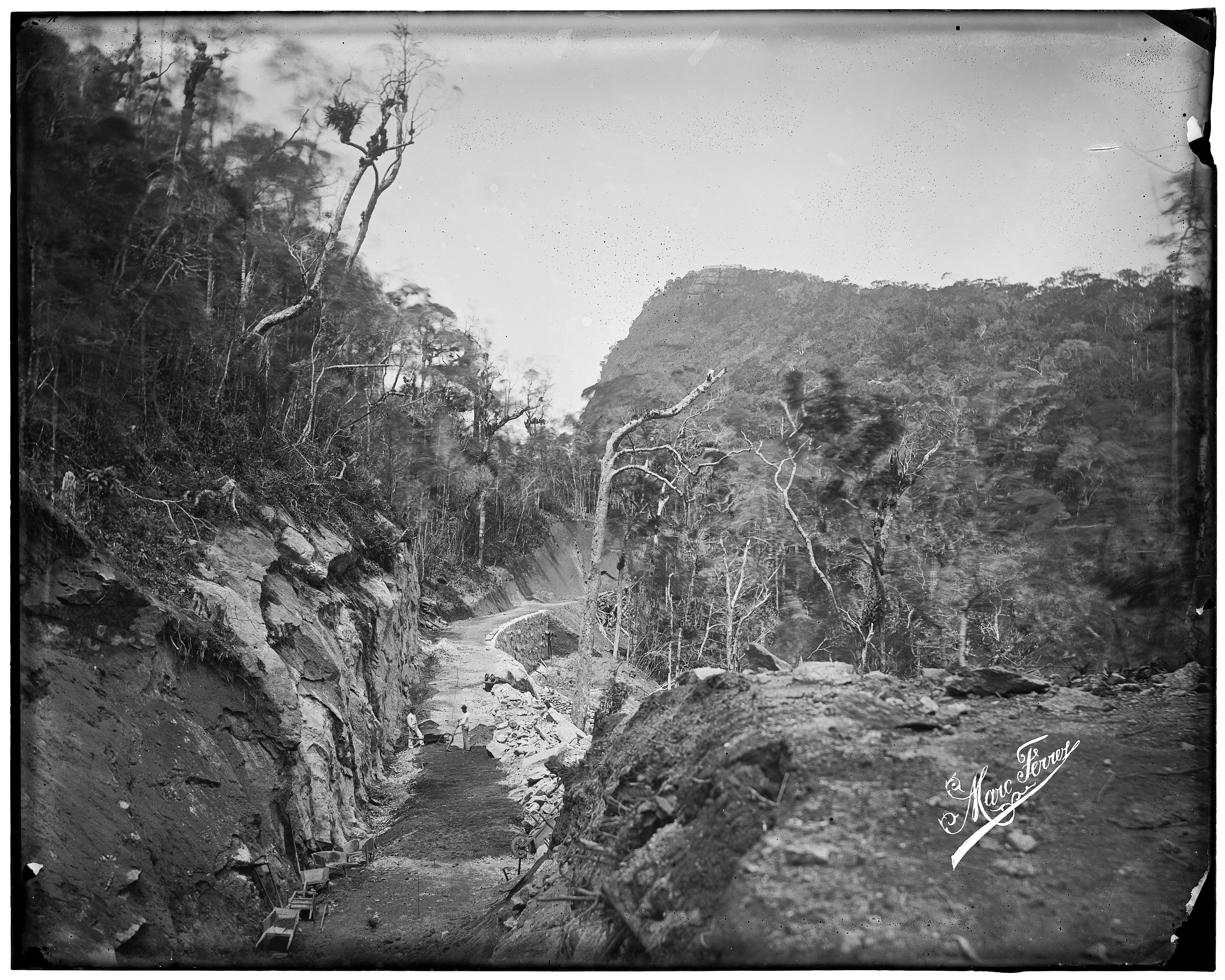
Construction of the rail line c. 1884

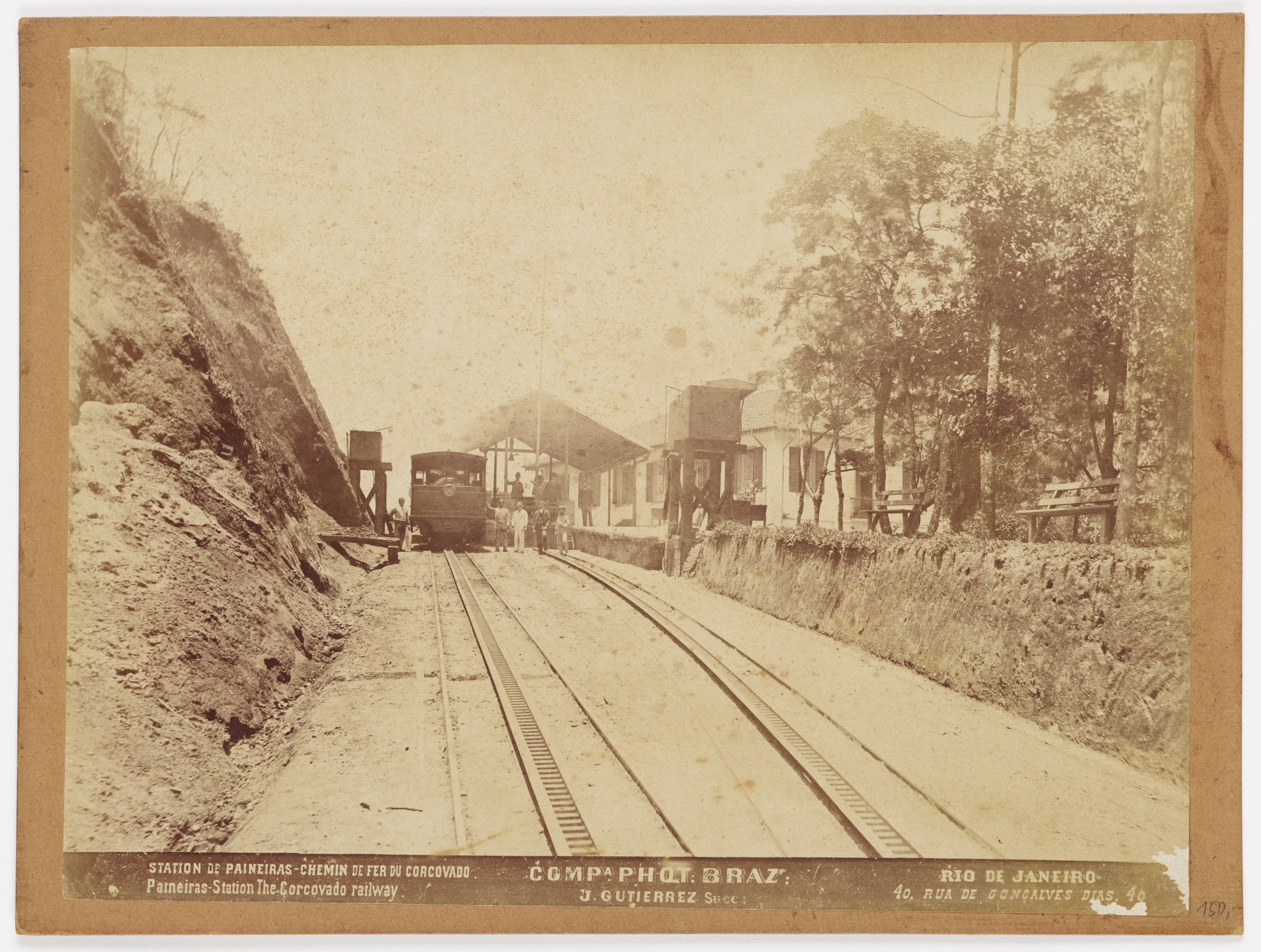
Paineiras station c. 1897, well before the construction of Christ the Redeemer

The railway was opened by Emperor Dom Pedro II of Brazil on 9 October 1884. Initially hauled by steam locomotives, the line was electrified in 1910, a first in Brazil. It was re-equipped in 1980 with trains built by Swiss Locomotive and Machine Works (SLM) of Winterthur, Switzerland, and these were in turn replaced in 2019 by vehicles from SLM's successor company Stadler Rail.

The line has been ridden by many famous people, including Pope Pius XII, Pope John Paul II, Alberto Santos-Dumont, Albert Einstein and Diana, Princess of Wales.

== Route and operation ==
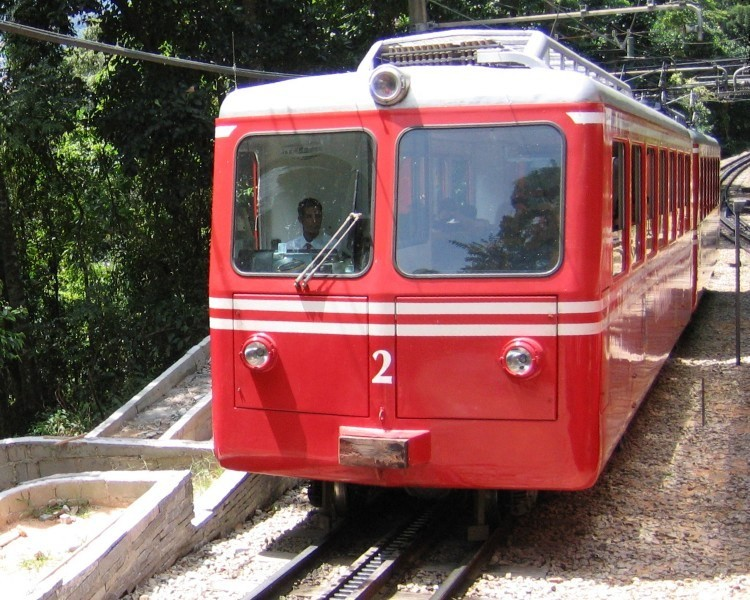
An old train, photographed in 2005.

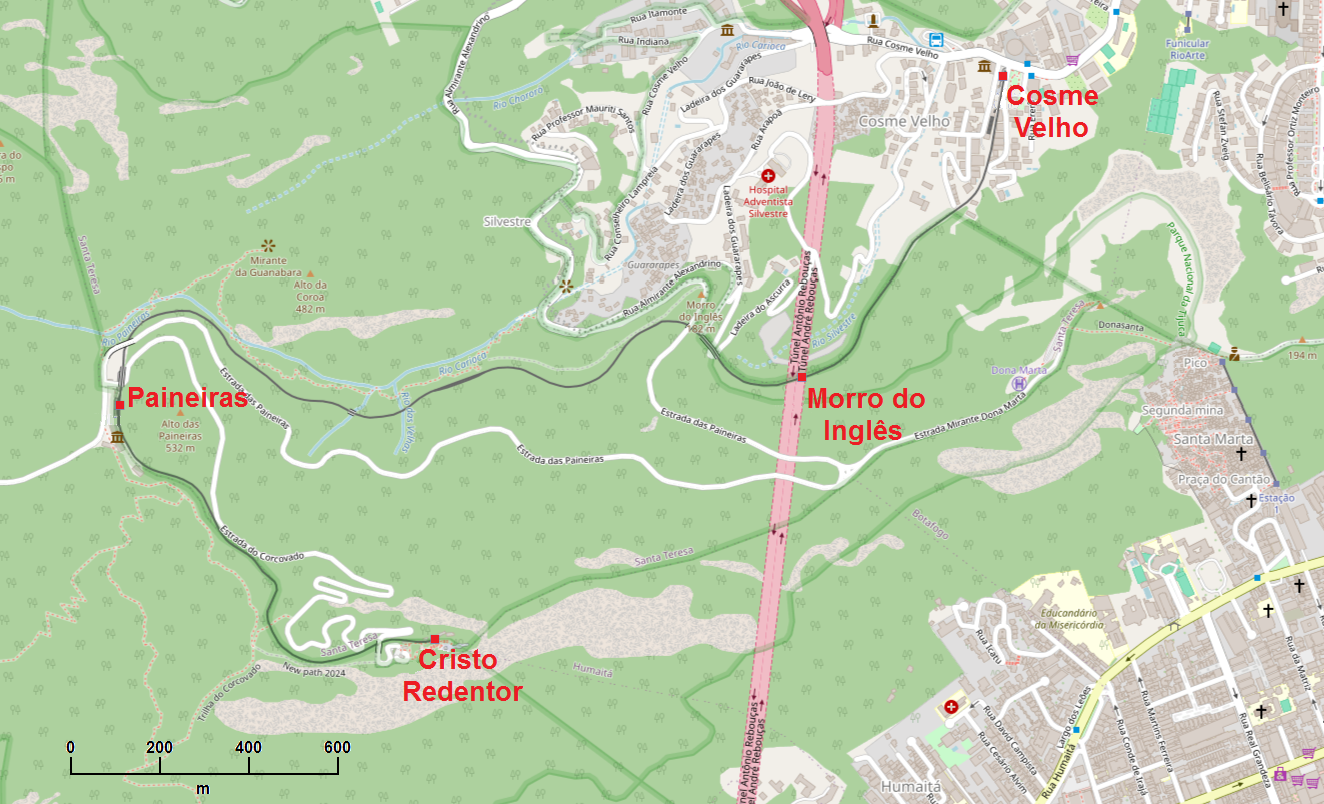
Map showing the railway's route up Corcovado.

The line is 3.824 km (2.376 mi) long and has four stations total. The termini are the historic base station in Cosme Velho and the summit of Corcovado.

The railway was built using metre gauge and the Riggenbach rack system, and has a maximum incline of 30%. It is one of the few remaining railways using three-phase electric power with two overhead wires, at 900 V 60 Hz.

Passengers ride in custom-built electric multiple units (EMU) made by Stadler. The vehicles, introduced in 2019, are capable of reaching a maximum speed of 25 km/h (16 mph), compared to the previous maximum of 15 km/h (9 mph), allowing the ascent to be made in about 15 minutes. During the descent, energy is recovered by regenerative braking, which leads to a saving of 75% of the overall power consumption.

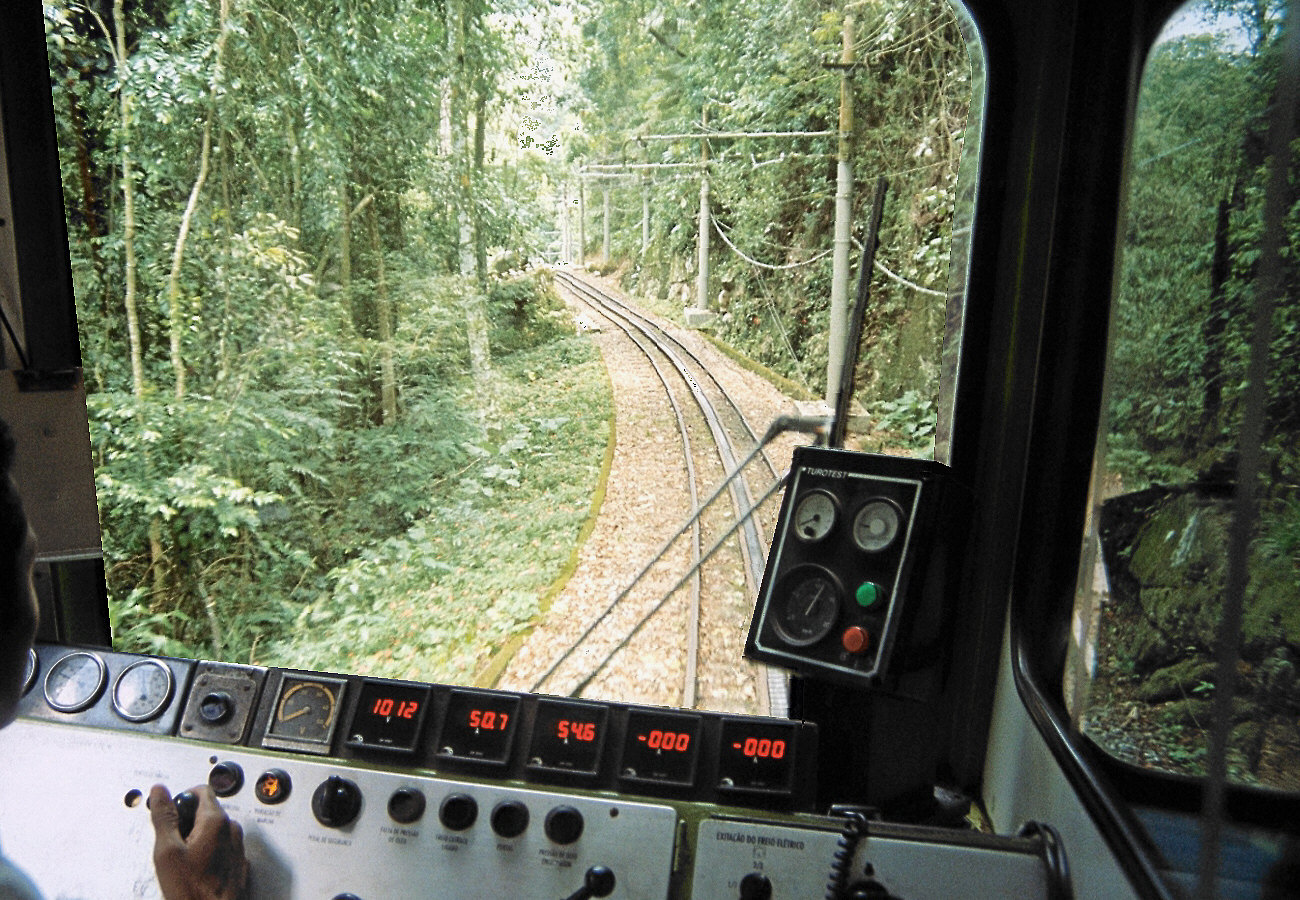
Engineer's view

There are three trains, each made of two cars. The trip takes approximately 20 minutes and departs every 20 minutes, giving a capacity of 540 passengers per hour. Due to this limited capacity the wait at the entry station can be several hours. As of March 2021, the line operates from 08:00 to 19:00 (8 am to 7 pm).).
