= List of favelas in Brazil =

This is a list of large favelas in Brazil. This Portuguese word is commonly used in Brazil. The 2022 Census indicated that there were 12,348 favelas and urban communities, with 16,390,815 individuals, or 8.1% of the country's population.

== Minas Gerais ==
- Belo Horizonte
  - Aglomerado da Serra
  - Morro do Papagaio
  - Acaba Mundo

== Santa Catarina ==
- Florianópolis
  - Monte Cristo

== Rio de Janeiro ==
- Niterói
  - Grota do Surucucu
  - Morro do Estado
- Rio de Janeiro (for a complete list, see the Portuguese WikiPedia article: Lista de favelas da cidade do Rio de Janeiro)
  - Babilônia
  - Benjamin Constant
  - Cajueiro
  - Cantagalo–Pavão–Pavãozinho
  - Chácara do Céu
  - Chapéu Mangueira
  - Cidade de Deus
  - Complexo do Lins
  - Complexo da Maré
  - Complexo do Alemão
  - Santa Marta
  - Jacarezinho
  - Ladeira dos Tabajaras
  - Mangueira
  - Manguinhos
  - Mineira
  - Morro Azul
  - Morro da Babilônia
  - Morro do Borel
  - Morro dos Cabritos
  - Morro do Cantagalo
  - Morro dos Macacos
  - Morro da Providência
  - Rocinha
  - Salgueiro
  - Serrinha
  - Tavares Bastos
  - Tuiuti
  - Vidigal
  - Vila do João
  - Vigário Geral
  - Vila Cruzeiro
  - Vila Parque da Cidade
  - Vila Pereira da Silva (Pereirão)

== São Paulo ==
- São Paulo (for a complete list, see the article in the Portuguese WikiPedia)
  - Heliópolis
  - Paraisópolis
  - Vila Nova Jaguaré
  - Radar (favela)
  - Vietnã
  - Favela da Alba
  - Buraco Quente
  - Morro do Piolho
  - Azul
  - Nega Rose
  - Dom Macario
  - Mauro
  - Mario Cardim
  - Campinho
  - Canão
  - Peri
- Piracicaba
  - Pantanal Community
  - Renascer Community

== Pernambuco ==
- Recife
  - Brasília Teimosa
  - Vila de Deus
  - Iraque
  - Ilha das Cobras (favela), Recife
  - Ilha Joana Bezerra
  - Alto dos Milagres
  - Suvaco da Cobra
  - Linha do Metro — (also known as Coque)
  - Entra a Pulso
- Olinda
  - Comunidade V8
  - Ilha do Rato — (also known as Ilha do Santana)
  - Ilha do Maruim

== Bahia ==
- Salvador
  - Alagados

== See also ==
- List of slums
