= Favelas in the city of Rio de Janeiro =

Slums in the Brazilian city

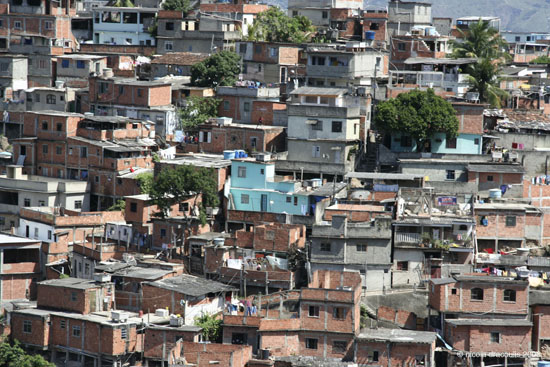
Complexo do Alemão, a group of more than thirteen favelas that, together, have a population of more than 65 thousand inhabitants.

Images of the Jacarezinho favela, North Zone of Rio de Janeiro, broadcast by Repórter Esso, on TV Tupi, in 1965.

The favelas in the city of Rio de Janeiro began to emerge at the end of the 19th century, when several socioeconomic transformations that Brazil was undergoing and local changes began to swell the central area of the city, forming the first tenements. It is believed that the first favela in Rio de Janeiro emerged in 1897 on the old Morro de Santo Antônio, however the oldest favela in the country is located on Morro da Providência, where some soldiers from the War of Canudos began to live.

According to official data from the 2010 Census, collected by the Brazilian Institute of Geography and Statistics (IBGE), there are 763 favelas in the city. Approximately two-ninths or 22% of the population of the city of Rio de Janeiro lives in favelas, with the capital of Rio de Janeiro being the municipality with the largest number of favela residents in Brazil, 1,393,314 inhabitants. In its metropolitan region, 1,702,073 people live in "subnormal settlements" ("assentamentos subnormais"), the government's definition for classifying favelas, which corresponds to 14.4% of the population of the metropolis.

The favelas of Rio de Janeiro have aspects that differentiate them from those of the rest of Brazil, such as those of São Paulo. In Rio de Janeiro, this type of urban settlement is more populous, with favelas with more than a thousand households predominating, in addition to the emergence of so-called "favela complexes", which are clusters of several nearby substandard settlements that have ended up conurbating, a phenomenon that is rarer in the rest of the country. Another characteristic of the favelas of Rio de Janeiro is their proximity to upscale and central areas, which creates a strong social contrast.

== History ==
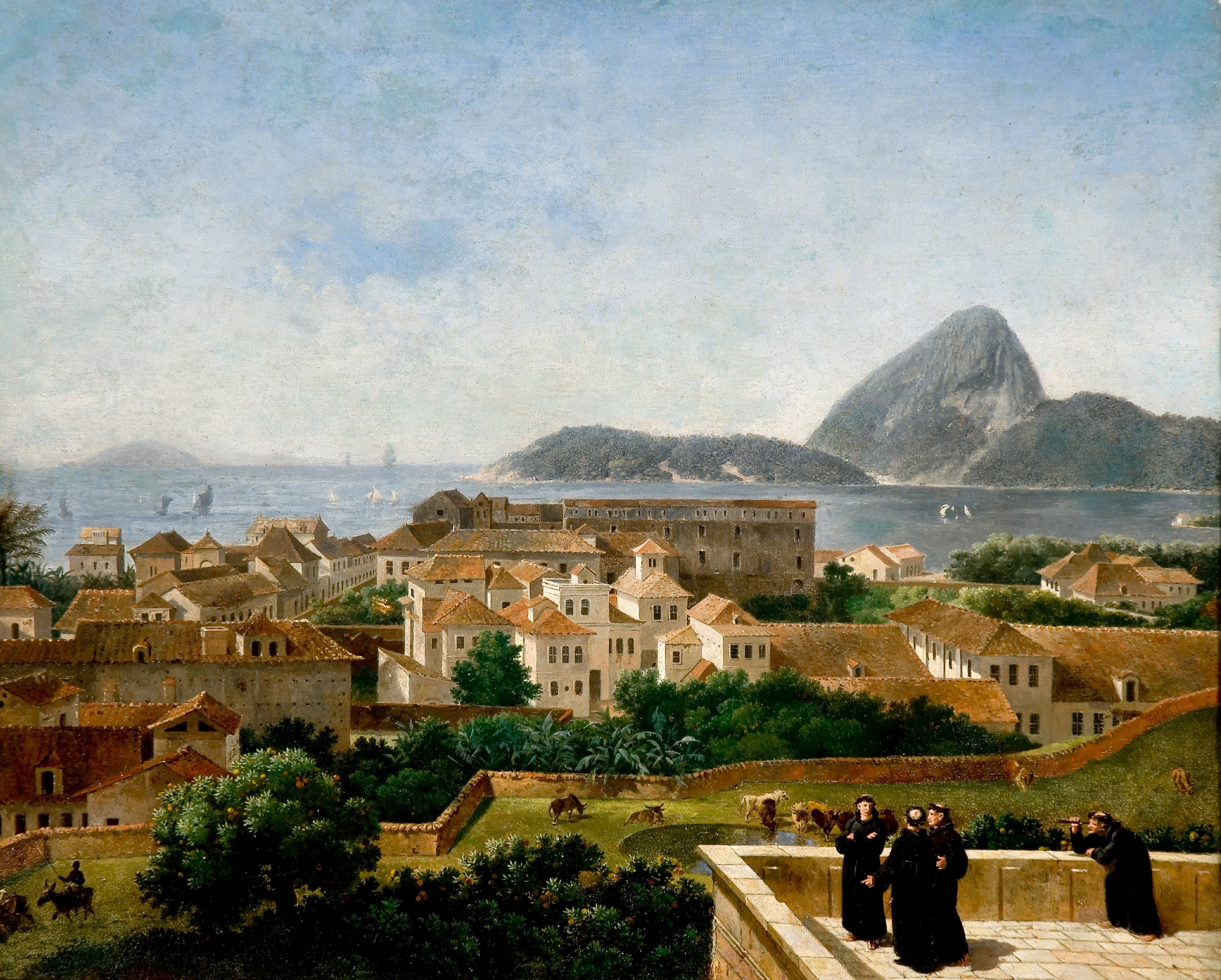
View from the top of Morro de Santo Antônio, by Nicolas-Antoine Taunay (c. 1816). It is believed that the country's first favela appeared on this hill in 1897.

In the mid-19th century, social transformations triggered by phenomena such as the decline of coffee production in the Paraíba Valley, the abolition of slavery and the beginning of the development of the industrial process in the country, brought many former slaves and Europeans, especially Portuguese, to the then capital of Brazil. The city's great demographic growth swelled its central area, which traditionally concentrated several tenements. The then mayor of the city, Cândido Barata Ribeiro, began the persecution of this type of housing, which culminated, in 1893, in the demolition of the "Cabeça de Porco" tenement. The entire eviction process displaced around 2 thousand people and a group of former tenement residents obtained permission to build their homes on Morro da Providência. Another group of soldiers who fought against the Revolta da Armada received permission to build homes on Morro de Santo Antônio, giving rise to the first clusters that would later be called "favelas".

In 1897, around 20,000 soldiers who had returned to Rio de Janeiro after the War of Canudos, in the eastern province of Bahia, began to live in the already inhabited Morro da Providência. During the conflict, the government troops had been housed in the region near a hill called "Favela", the name of a resistant plant of the Euphorbiaceae family, which caused irritation when it came into contact with human skin and which was common in the region. The plant was of the species Cnidoscolus quercifolius, known as the "faveleira" tree. Because it had sheltered people who had fought in that conflict, Morro da Providência was given the nickname "Morro da Favela". The name became popular and, from the 1920s onwards, the hills covered by shacks and huts began to be called favelas.

At the beginning of the 20th century, these newly formed irregular constructions, as well as the old tenements, were seen by most of the population of Rio as the home of crime and disease. However, as the capital of the Republic of Brazil, which had recently been proclaimed, Rio de Janeiro needed to undergo reforms to become a more European and modern city by the standards of the time. It was then that mayor Francisco Pereira Passos began to carry out extensive urban reforms in the city center, which included the expansion and opening of new roads, such as Avenida Central. During the reforms, several tenements were demolished and their residents were forced to find other ways to live in the increasingly valued center, including occupying the nearby hills, which forced a strong expansion of the favelas during this period. However, the residents of these settlements would only begin to be recognized by society and the government from the 1920s onwards.

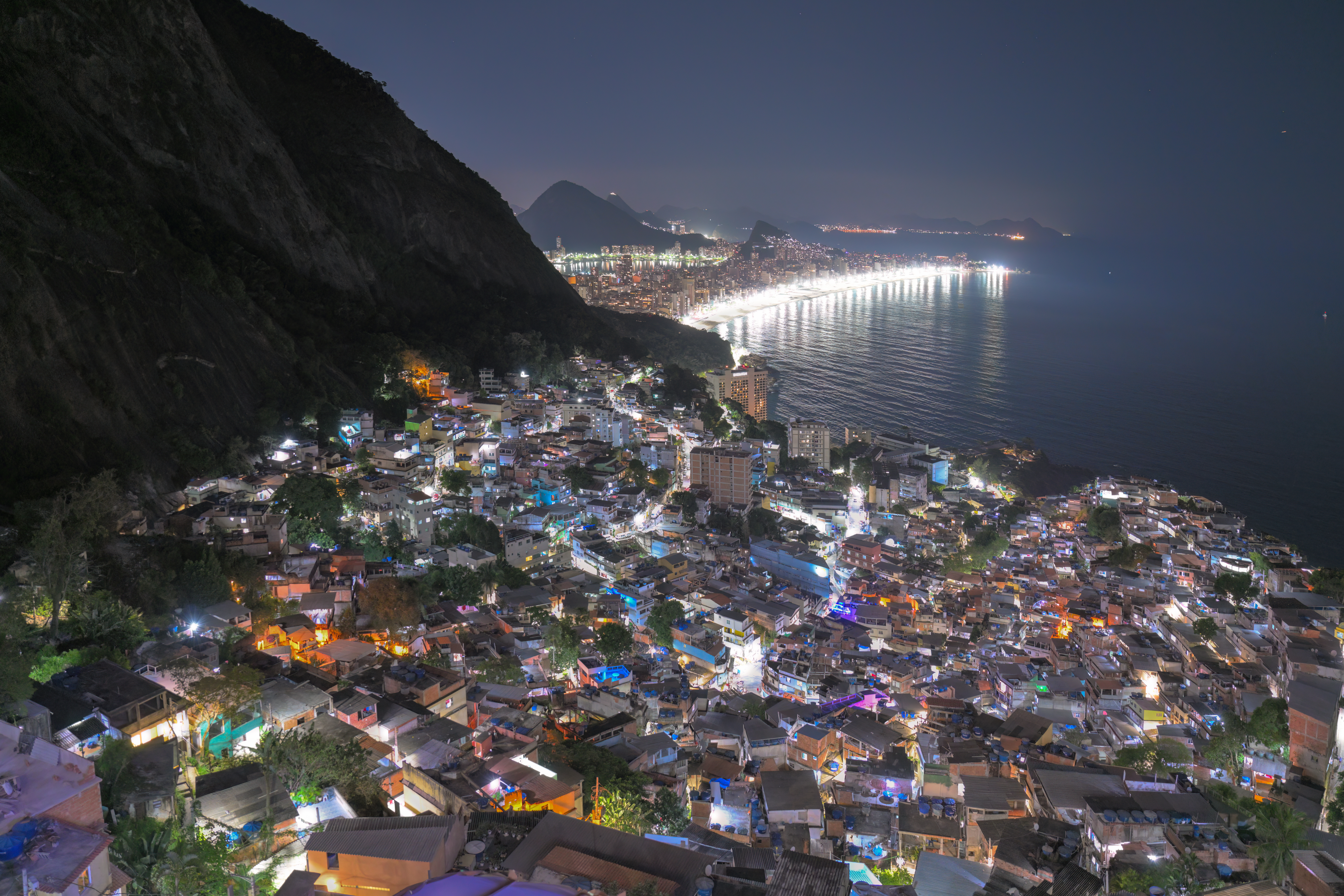
View of the Vidigal favela at night.

Since then, beginning in the Estado Novo era under the government of Getúlio Vargas, through the government of Carlos Lacerda in Guanabara, and up until the military dictatorship in the 1960s, several programs to remove and eliminate favelas have evicted and displaced thousands of people and destroyed many shacks, without achieving any success in solving the problem. It is estimated that between 1962 and 1974, 80 favelas were involved in these programs, resulting in 26,193 shacks being destroyed and 139,218 inhabitants being removed. During the military dictatorship, some leaders of favela communities were tortured and killed.

In the late 1970s and early 1980s, population growth, the absence of the State and the consequent lack of public policies made the favelas the main centers of drug trafficking in Rio de Janeiro, which made these areas even more violent. It was only in the 1990s, when these settlements were already consolidated and their populations were already huge, that the municipal government began to look for ways to urbanize the city's favelas, instead of simply demolishing them. During this period, programs such as Favela-Bairro (popular name for the Rio de Janeiro Popular Settlements Urbanization Program) began to bring some type of infrastructure to these areas, such as running water, basic sanitation, garbage collection, public lighting, etc. In 2008, the Public Security Department of the State of Rio de Janeiro began to implement the Pacifying Police Unit (UPP) project, which consists of implementing community police units in favelas dominated by drug trafficking, regaining control of the territory for the State. Currently, the project benefits around 540,500 people in the city through 36 UPPs. However, allegations of abuse of authority have been made against some military police officers who work in these units.

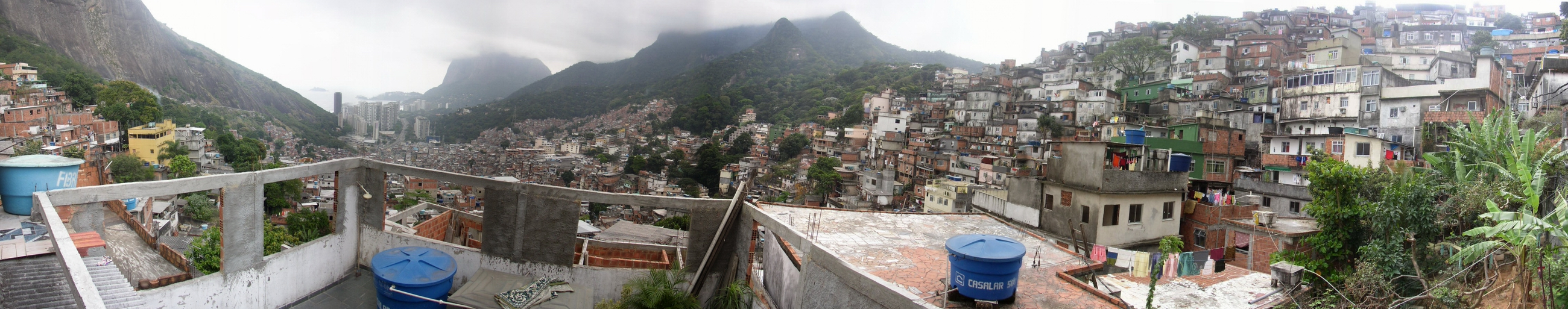
Rocinha favela, in Rio de Janeiro, the largest in Brazil, with 69,161 inhabitants.

== See also ==
- Favela
- Favelas in the city of São Paulo
- Slum
- 2010 Rio de Janeiro security crisis
