= Favelas in the city of São Paulo =

Slums in the Brazilian city

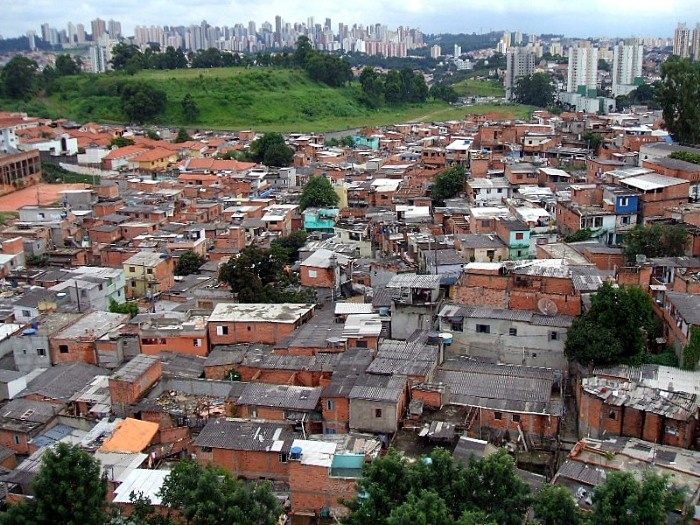
Jardim Jaqueline favela, in the West Zone of São Paulo.

The emergence of favelas in the city of São Paulo began in the 1940s and accelerated substantially in the following decades, mainly due to the huge flow of migrants from other regions of Brazil in search of work and better living conditions. Currently, the city of São Paulo has the largest number of favelas in Brazil.

In 2007, according to a study conducted jointly by the city of São Paulo and the international organization Cities Alliance, financed by the World Bank, the capital of São Paulo had 1,538 favelas, occupying an area of 30 square kilometers. According to the same study, the number of families living in the city's favelas was 400,000, bringing together an estimated total of between 1.6 and 2 million people, or approximately 16% of the city's population.

According to data from 2000, adding the favela population to the residents of tenements and other irregular residences, more than half of São Paulo's residents live in housing classified as "substandard housing" ("submoradias"). However, according to official data from the 2010 Census, collected by the Brazilian Institute of Geography and Statistics (IBGE), approximately 11% of the population of the city of São Paulo. In its metropolitan region, 2,162,368 people live in "subnormal settlements" ("assentamentos subnormais"), the government's definition for classifying favelas, which corresponds to 11% of the metropolis' population.

== Characteristics ==
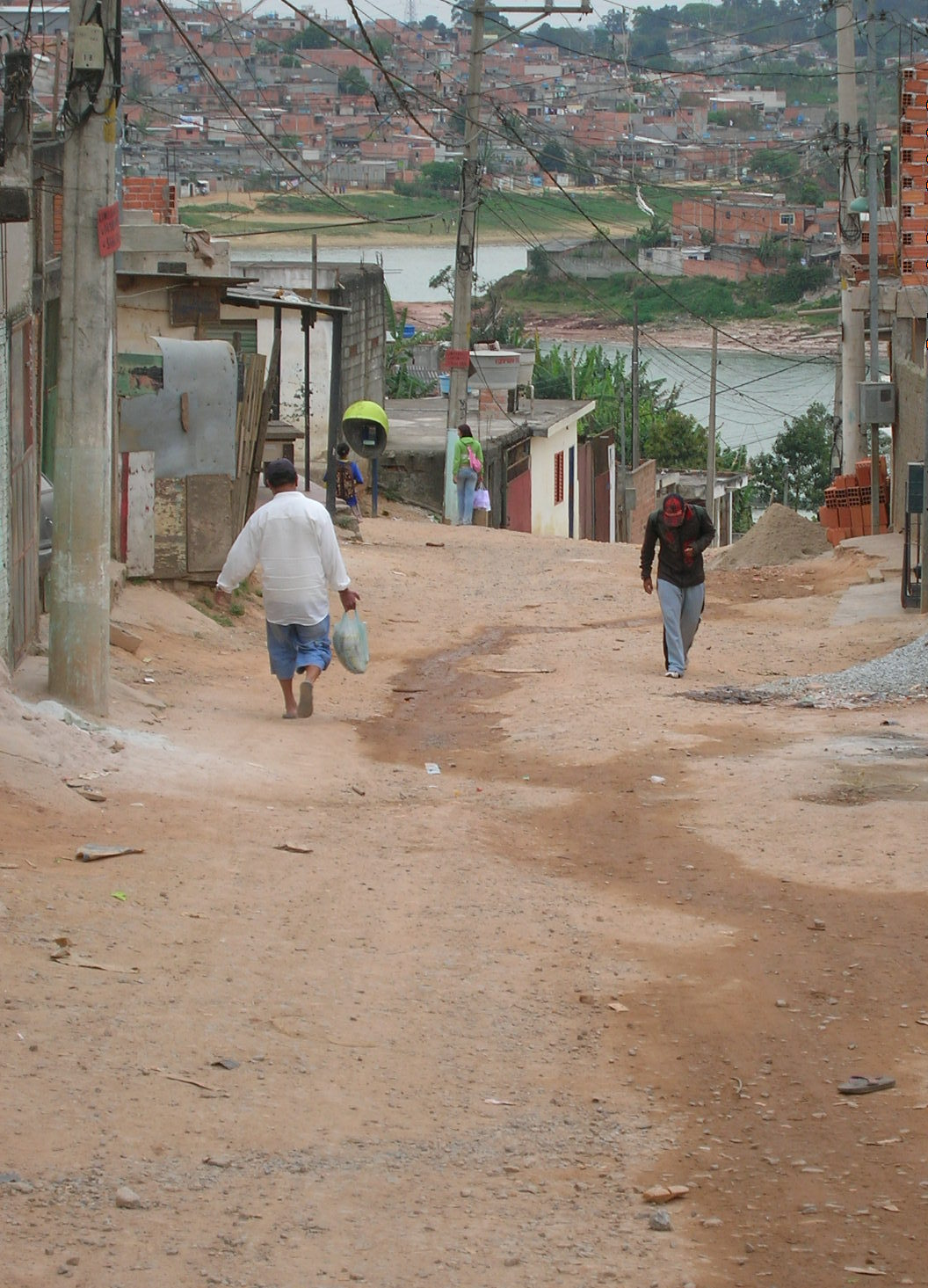
Cantinho do Céu favela, located in Grajaú, South Zone.

Favelas are one of the most serious social problems in the city of São Paulo, as they expose a considerable portion of the population to poor housing conditions, whether due to the lack of infrastructure services, the safety conditions of the properties (often at risk of collapse, flooding, fire, etc.), or the unsatisfactory health conditions, exposing residents to the risk of contracting various diseases (in addition to the risks arising, in some cases, from pollution by industrial waste and contamination by radioactive material). Considering the surroundings of these substandard housing, the precariousness also manifests itself in the scarcity of public services, with a lack of health, education, culture, leisure and transportation facilities. The favela population is also more vulnerable to various forms of violence and disrespect for the principle of human dignity. It is not uncommon for São Paulo's favelas to have high rates of homicide and various other crimes, in addition to activities related to drug trafficking.

Although the flow of migrants to São Paulo has been significantly reduced in recent decades, the favelas of São Paulo continue to register high rates of vegetative growth. The aforementioned 2007 study found a 38% increase in the city's favela population compared to another study conducted four years earlier. In 2008, the increase in the population of São Paulo's favelas was 4%, twice the city's vegetative growth, according to data from the Municipal Housing Department. Despite this, the occupied area remained practically the same, which indicates a phenomenon of "swelling" and a significant increase in population density in the city's favelas. The growth in the population living in favelas in São Paulo contrasts with the situation in Brazil. The country managed to reduce the number of people living in favelas by 16% between 2000 and 2010.

Currently, the favelas are located mainly in the South Zone (796), followed by the following zones: North (373), East (372), West (91) and Central (4). The sub-prefectures with the largest number of communities are: Campo Limpo (186), M'Boi Mirim (172), Socorro (125), Cidade Ademar (123) and Freguesia do Ó/Brasilândia (105).

According to a survey conducted by the newspaper O Estado de S. Paulo in 2011, with information from the Municipal Housing Department, there are approximately 22 favelas located in upscale areas of the city, some of which are over 5 decades old. The majority are located in the southwest vector, in the neighborhoods of Vila Mariana, Campo Belo, Planalto Paulista, Itaim Bibi, Aclimação, Brooklin and Vila Madalena. Because they are located on narrow streets, far from the main avenues, they go unnoticed by the general population.

== History ==
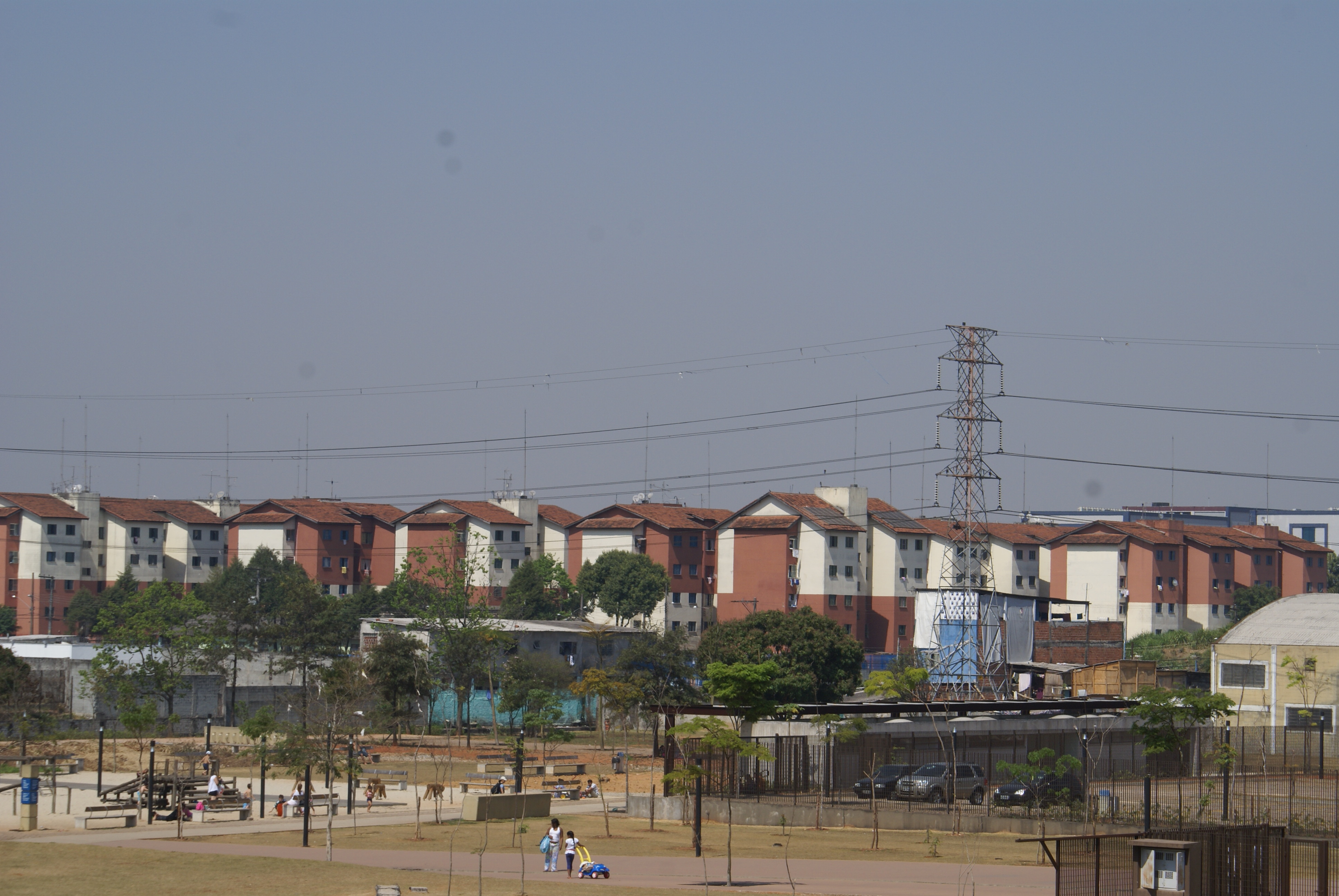
To reduce the housing problem, the city government built affordable housing, such as Cingapura, located in the Carandiru neighborhood, next to the extinct Zaki Narchi favela.

The city of São Paulo has always had a portion of its population living in precarious housing conditions. As early as the second half of the 19th century, reports produced by the municipal government pointed to the precariousness of the unhealthy tenements that surrounded the city's central neighborhoods. The main concern of the municipal authorities at the time was that the epidemics and plagues that were confined to these areas would spread to other regions and, consequently, affect other segments of São Paulo society.

This concern motivated the first actions in the field of hygiene and sanitation, which recommended the demolition of tenements and the construction of housing outside the urban perimeter. There was no concern, however, with the establishment of public policies that would serve this segment of society. Reflecting the complex "web" of relations between public and private interests that permeate the history of the occupation of urban space in São Paulo, the authorities delegated to the private sector the measures related to the occupation of the territory, while at the same time expressing the intention of "segregating" the population that lived in these sub-housings, contenting themselves with moving them away from the city center, without addressing the problem of the housing deficit.

This way of acting by the public authorities would remain substantially unchanged for most of the 20th century. With the demographic explosion of the city, the problem of precarious housing began to affect increasingly larger social strata of the population, creating around the better "planned" central neighborhoods a large ring of peripheral neighborhoods, with irregular and disconnected layouts, interspersed with empty and occupied spaces, often formed by "self-built" houses, with large concentrations of poverty and lacking or insufficiently provided with infrastructure services and public facilities. It is mainly in these regions that the favelas of the city of São Paulo are concentrated today, which began to appear in the mid-20th century.

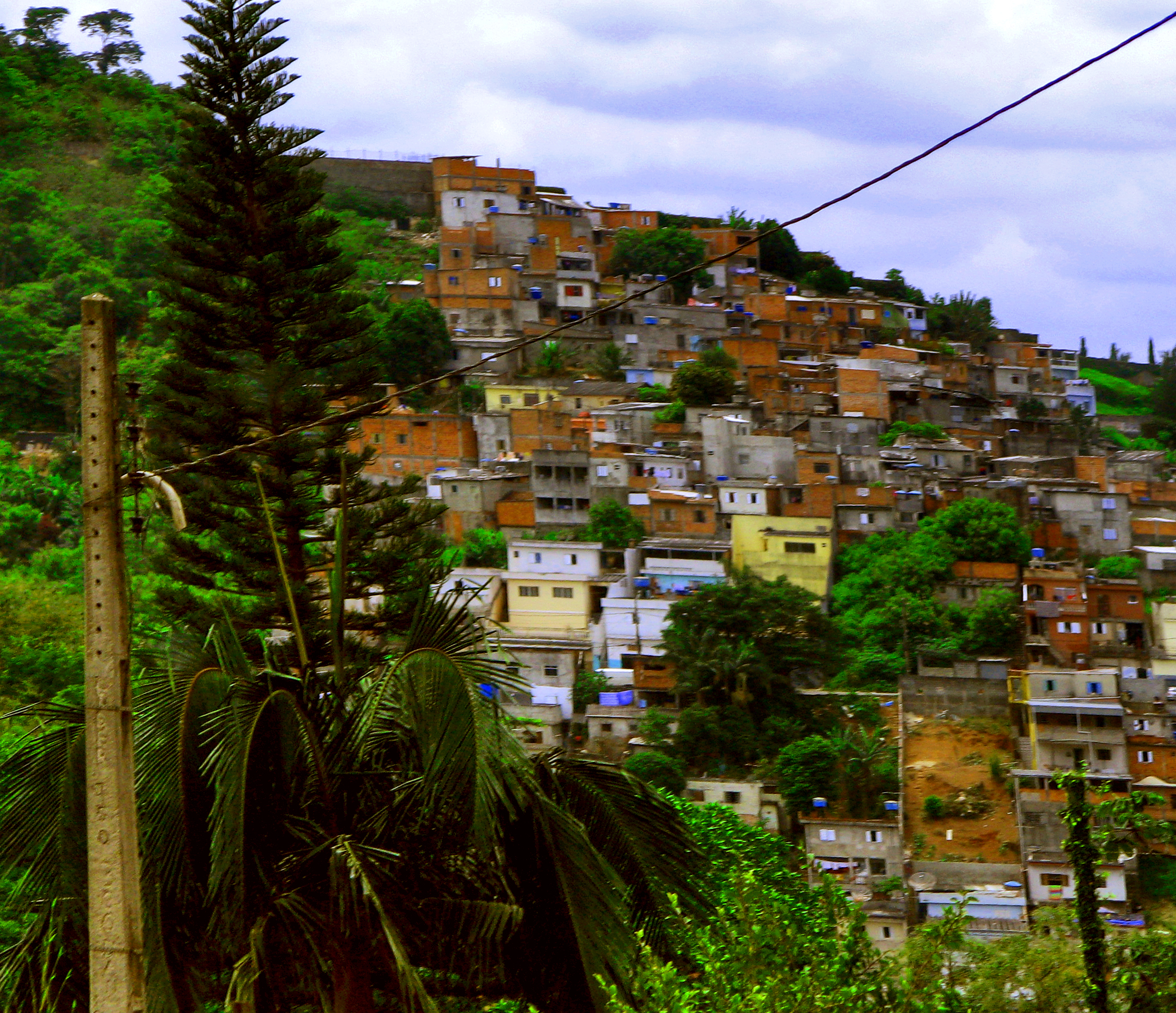
It is estimated that 115,000 people live in high-risk areas in the city. In the photo we see the irregular peripheral occupation near Serra da Cantareira, North Zone.

The first favelas in São Paulo date back to the 1940s. Research carried out by the Statistics and Documentation Division of the City of São Paulo at that time lists information on the favelas and favela residents established in Mooca (Oratório favela), Ibirapuera, Barra Funda (Ordem e Progresso favela) and Vila Prudente (the latter still in existence). In the following decades, with the huge influx of migrants from other regions of the country, especially the Northeast, the favela formation process would increase exponentially. Poor residents began to occupy empty and unused land, hillsides and protected areas, such as water sources. In 1957, the number of favela residents in São Paulo was estimated at 50,000, occupying 8,488 shacks in 141 sub-housing units. A new quantification made in 1962, based on information provided by the University Movement for the Removal of Slums (MUD), indicated that this number had already risen to 150,000 people.

From the 1970s onwards, the phenomenon of slumming began to develop on a large scale and has continued to grow to this day. In 1973, the city government created the Slum Registry, linked to the Department of Social Welfare. A census carried out between 1973 and 1974 indicated a slum population considerably lower than that estimated by the University Movement for the Removal of Slums. According to this methodology, the city's slum population at the time totaled almost 72,000 inhabitants (1.1% of the total population), living in 14,500 shacks spread across 525 slums. In comparison with the survey conducted in 1957, the 1973/1974 census indicated a decrease in the average size of favelas, from 60 to 30 shacks, characterizing a typology of small favelas spread throughout the urban area, quite different from the typology of Rio de Janeiro favelas, where the topography and configuration of land ownership allowed the formation of clusters of favelas ("complexes").

A 2009 study found that the number of favelas had stopped growing and had been decreasing, although the population of favelas is still growing.

== See also ==
- Favela
- Favelas in the city of Rio de Janeiro
- Social issues in Brazil
