= Wikifavelas =

- Website type: Online encyclopedia
- Country of origin: Brazil
- Creator: Sônia Fleury
- Website: wikifavelas.com.br
- Commercial: No
- Registration: Optional
- Launched: April 16, 2019 (7 years ago)
- Current status: Active

The Dicionário de Favelas Marielle Franco ("Marielle Franco Dictionary of Favelas"), or Wikifavelas, is a wiki-based website whose objective is the collective construction of knowledge about Brazil's favelas and urban peripheries. It was launched on April 16, 2019, with support from CNPq and Fiocruz, on the 33rd anniversary of the institution's Institute of Scientific and Technological Communication and Information in Health, under the general coordination of Sônia Fleury.

Wikifavelas is also a collaborative construction space for a nationally circulated newspaper. The platform seeks to fill a gap in transdisciplinary knowledge, which is the study of favelas, by bringing together knowledge produced across various thematic areas, such as socioeconomic conditions, public policies, culture, sociability, among others. In an epistemological sense, Wikifavelas is recognized as a form of knowledge production based on community and peripheral knowledge through a collaborative epistemology, with a focus on reclaiming and reconstructing ancestral knowledge.

== History ==
Favelas have historically been treated in a homogeneous and peripheral manner in Brazil, which is why the project was born as a way for residents to aggregate knowledge from diverse points of view. The project began to be formulated in 2016 and had gained the support of Marielle Franco, who wrote a draft entry and a proposal related to her monograph on the Police Pacifying Units (UPPs). The site was named in her honor following her assassination in 2018. It launched on April 16, 2019, with 155 articles, including entries on Funk Dance Parties, Social Museology, and Favela Literature. By the end of 2023, the site featured over 2,100 entries and had accumulated nearly 9 million visits during the year. In early 2024, its visual identity was updated.

== Studies and awards ==
Wikifavelas has been the subject of studies seeking to understand its role as a mobilizer for a broad debate on memory as a right to the city, through a perspective that views memory as part of the trajectory of subjectification and positive recognition for favela populations. The project was the focus of a study titled "Wikifavelas: information technology in the decolonization of knowledge" and received an honorable mention in the poster presentation category of the 2020 Lévi-Strauss Prize, awarded by the Brazilian Anthropology Association. In 2019, the project was also the subject of a study published in the XV Brazilian Symposium on Collaborative Systems by researchers from the Oswaldo Cruz Foundation; this study, entitled "Wikifavelas: A Collaborative Tool for Social Organizations," received an honorable mention award.
