= Morro do Estado =

Morro do Estado (Portuguese for State Hill) is a hill and one of the 48 administrative districts in the city of Niterói, Rio de Janeiro, Brazil.

The neighborhood lies in the southern zone of the city, neighboring Ingá and Icaraí.

The hill has a favela (Brazilian slum) district, that is very poor and often violent.

== See also ==
- Neighborhoods of Niterói
