= Favela Brass =

Music school in Rio de Janeiro

Favela Brass is a free music school in the Pereirão favela in Rio de Janeiro, Brazil. It was set up by Englishman Tom Ashe in 2013 and drew international attention when the children performed at the 2016 Summer Olympics.

== History ==
Favela Brass was established in the Pereirão favela by Englishman Tom Ashe after he moved to Rio de Janeiro in 2008 to follow his career as a musician. After seeing the lack of opportunities for children growing up in the favela, he decided to set up a free school in 2013. By 2016 the school had over 40 students. The students practice three times a week. They played at the 2016 Summer Olympics which took place in Rio.

Ashe is originally from Doncaster and was inspired by his childhood participation in the Doncaster Youth Jazz Association. He appealed for second-hand instruments to be sent from England to Rio, and a Doncaster brass band fund-raised for the school. He set up a curry club with all proceeds going to the school and the teachers work as volunteers. Funds were also generated by artists in Rio selling their work in an Instagram auction hosted by actress Juliana Boller.

By 2019, the school had found a permanent home and Ashe was arranging performances outside the state of Rio de Janeiro.

In 2026, Tom Ashe was awarded the British Empire Medal in the 2026 New Year Honours for services to music education in Rio de Janeiro. In July 2026 the school was a profile subject on the GloboNews programme Extraordinários.
