= M'Boi Mirim =

Coordinates: 23°41′10″S 46°46′14″W

M'Boi Mirim (Portuguese pronunciation: [mˈbojmiˈɾĩ]) is a road in the city of São Paulo, Brazil. Its name comes from the Tupi language and means "little snake". It comprises two districts: Jardim Ângela and Campo Limpo.

M'Boi Mirim is an extremely poor and violent area, and some years ago it was pointed out that it has a rate of death caused by firearms higher than many of the world's most violent areas, such as in Colombia and the Middle East. In 2000, it was described by the United Nations as the world's most violent place. However, the crime rate has fallen in the recent years due to community action. The murder rate was reduced by almost 50%.
