= Renascer Community =

Renascer Community Comunidade Renascer
- Slum
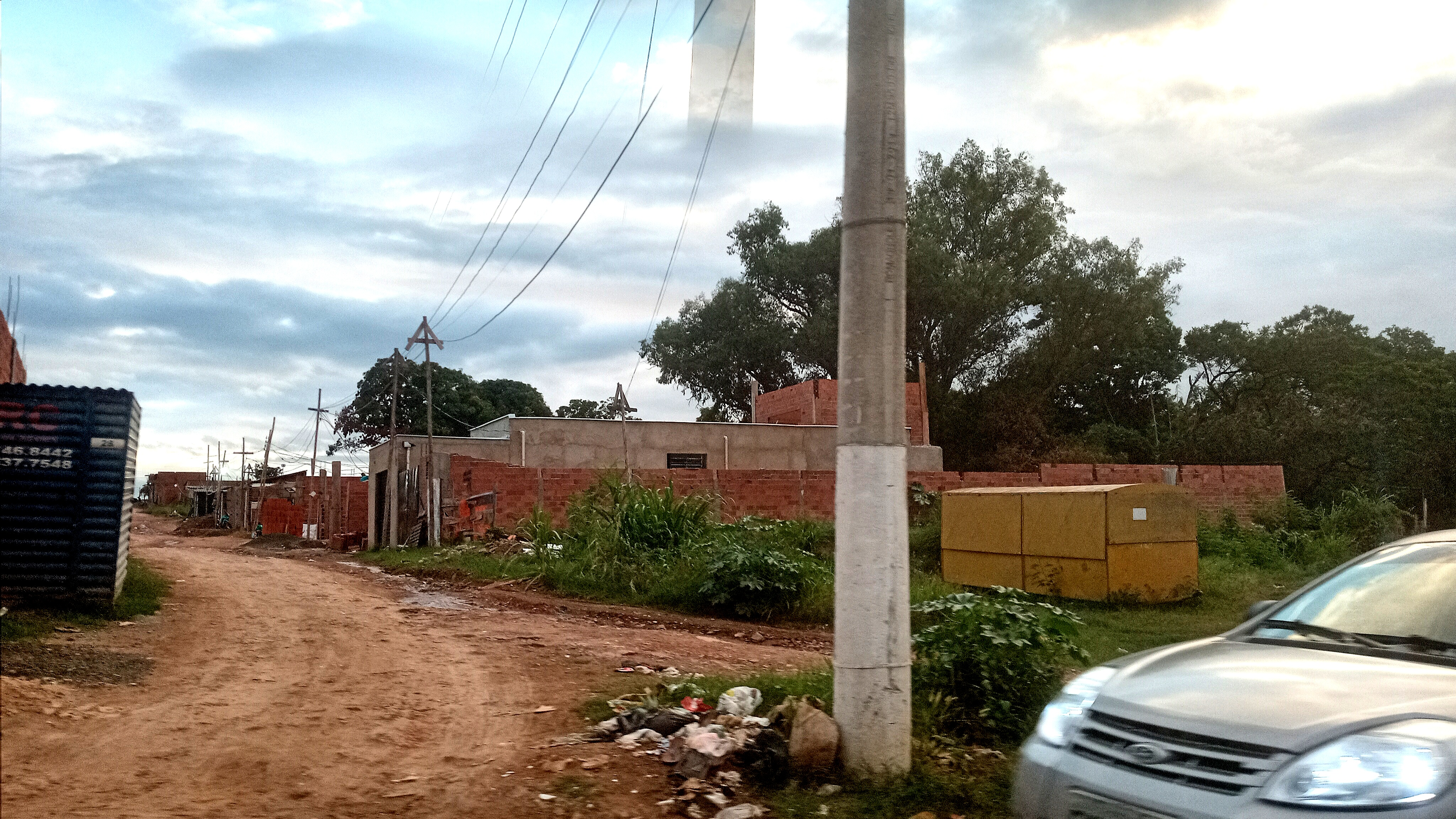
- Renascer in April 2025

- Location in the state of São Paulo Renascer Community (Brazil)
- Coordinates: 22°45′7″S 47°40′13″W
- Country: Brazil
- State: São Paulo (SP)
- Municipality/City: Piracicaba
- Neighborhood: Novo Horizonte

Area
  - Total: 150,000 km^{2} (58,000 sq mi)

Population
  - Estimate (2021): 2,000

Renascer Community (Portuguese: Comunidade Renascer, pronounced [ko.mu.niˈda.d͡ʒi ʁe.naˈseʁ], reborn community) is a slum located in the Novo Horizonte neighborhood, in the city of Piracicaba, interior of the state of São Paulo, Brazil. It was founded around December 2019, and it is growing rapidly since 2020. In 2021, Renascer had more than 2,000 inhabitants, and it is considered one of the largest urban communities of the interior of São Paulo. The community has been threatened with repossession and eviction several times.
