= Morro da Providência =

Favela in the Santo Cristo and Gamboa districts of Rio de Janeiro, Brazil

Coordinates: 22°54′03″S 43°11′48″W

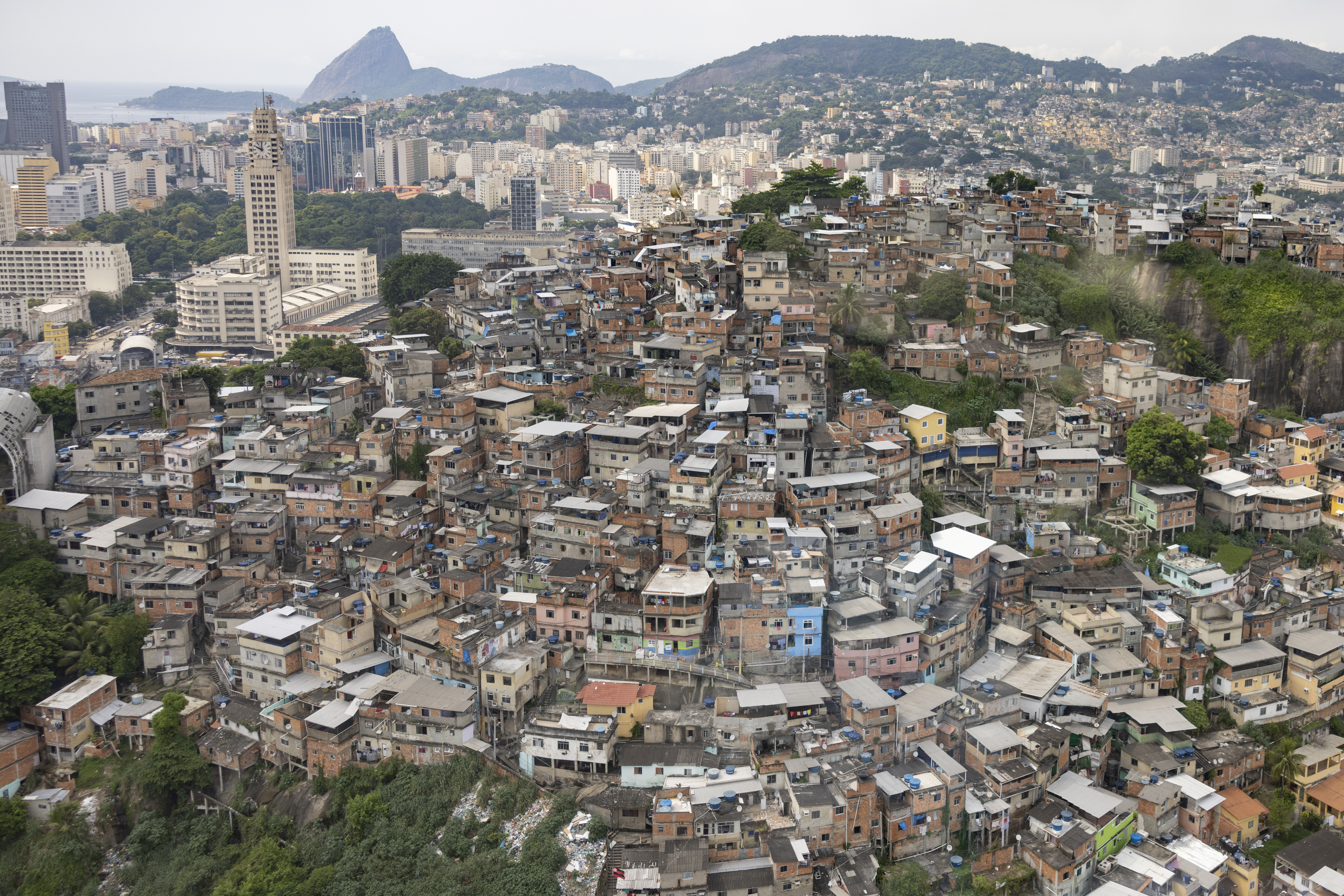
Morro da Providência

Morro da Providência ("Providence Hill") is a favela located between the two Rio de Janeiro districts of Santo Cristo and Gamboa. It has an altitude of 115 metres and is located in the port area of the city (currently the subject of a major revitalization known as the Porto Maravilha). It is widely considered to be the first favela community in Brazil.

"The granite hump of Providencia gazes down like a stern guardian on the old port of Rio de Janeiro. It offers probably the finest viewpoint over any city I know."

== History ==
In 1897, victorious veterans of the Canudos War who were promised land in the old capital upon their return found that such promises were not kept. In frustration and desperation, the soldiers invaded the hill scrub land close to the (then) Ministry of War. The hill was initially named Morro da Favela after the favela plant, a skin-irritating bush belonging to the spurge family, which is indigenous to the region where the soldiers fought against the Canudos settlers in the eastern province of Bahia.

In the early 20th century, freed slaves joined the soldiers and were joined by new European migrants as well, because it was the only affordable place to live near their work in the city's centre and port.
