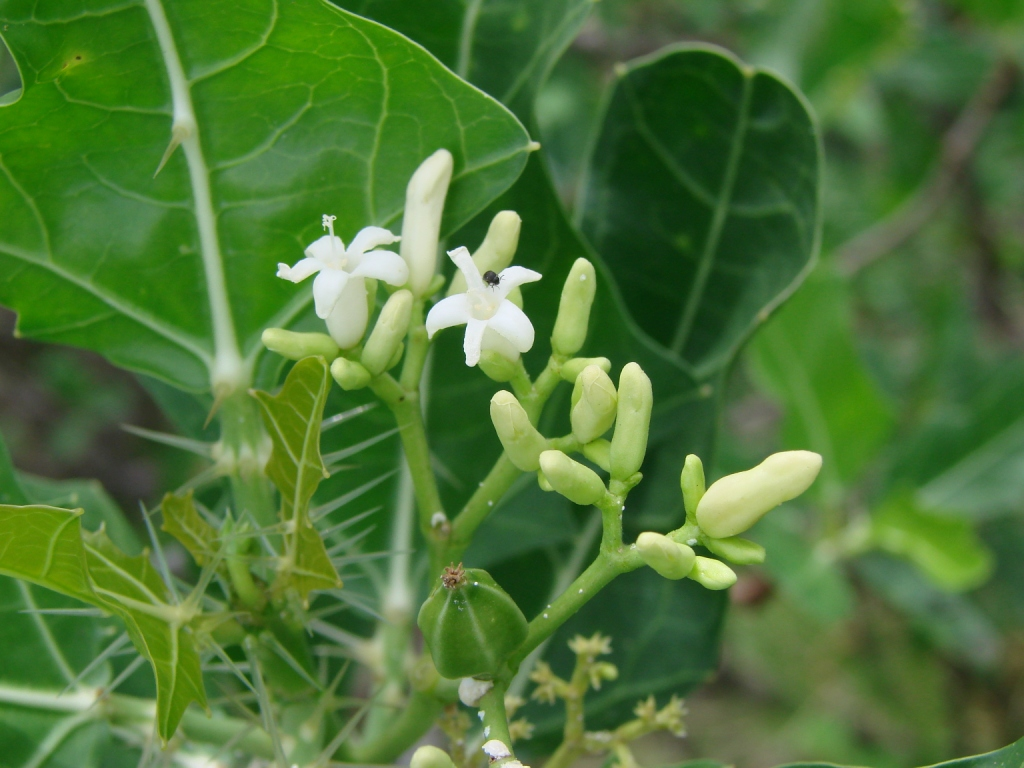

Scientific classification
- Kingdom: Plantae
- Clade: Tracheophytes
- Clade: Angiosperms
- Clade: Eudicots
- Clade: Rosids
- Order: Malpighiales
- Family: Euphorbiaceae
- Genus: Cnidoscolus
- Species: C. quercifolius

Binomial name
- Cnidoscolus quercifolius Pohl

Synonyms
- Cnidoscolus phyllacanthus

= Cnidoscolus quercifolius =

Species of flowering plant

Cnidoscolus quercifolius (syn. C. phyllacanthus; common names in Portuguese: favela, faveleira, faveleiro, and mandioca-brava) is a species of flowering plant. It is endemic to Brazil. Its distributional range includes Bahia, Pernambuco, and Piauí. Its common name is the source of the term "favela" for a type of low-income informal settlement in Brazil.
