= Brazilian drug war =

Ongoing conflict in Brazil

- Part of violent crime and Illegal drug trade in Brazil during the war on drugs
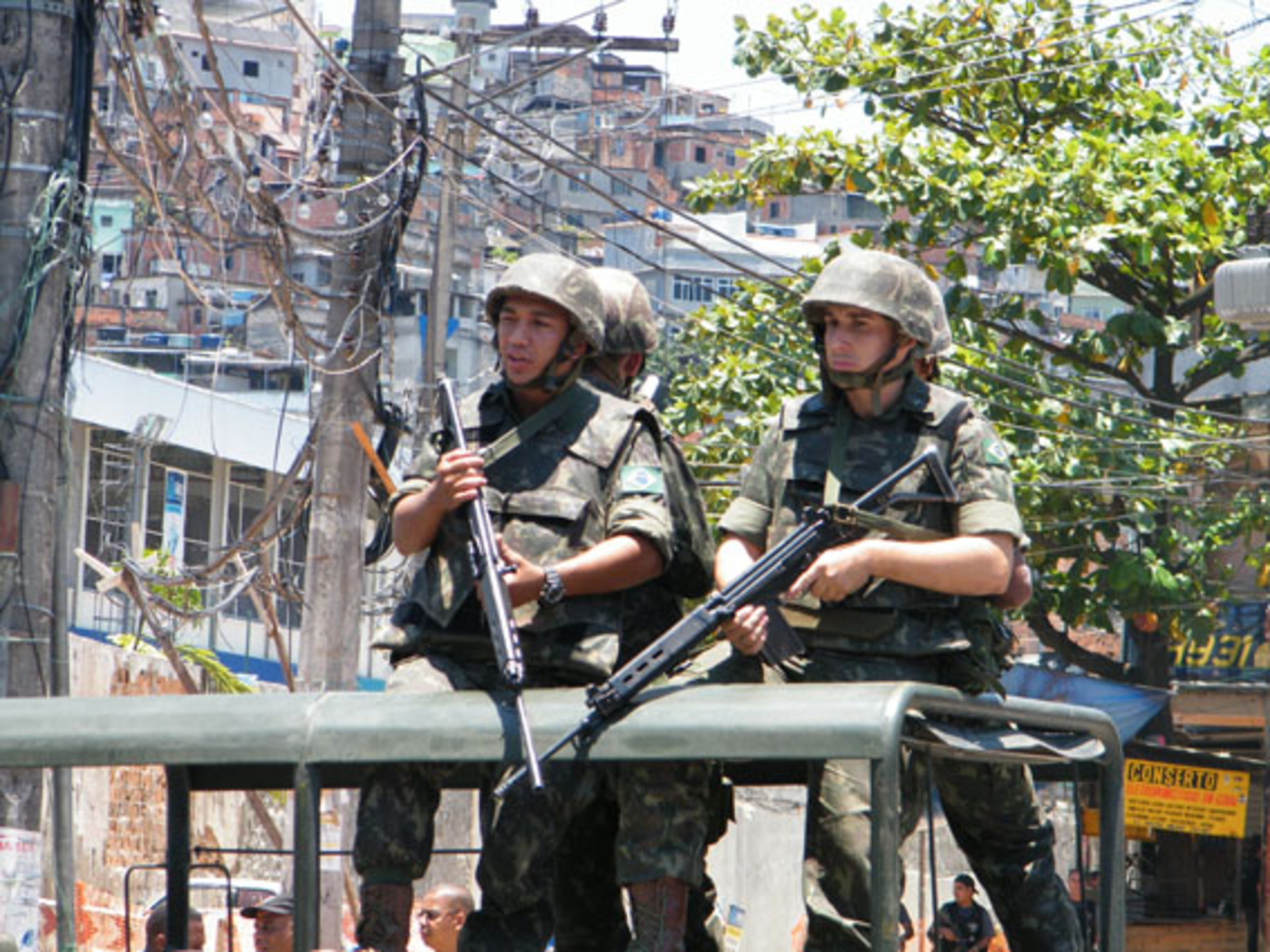
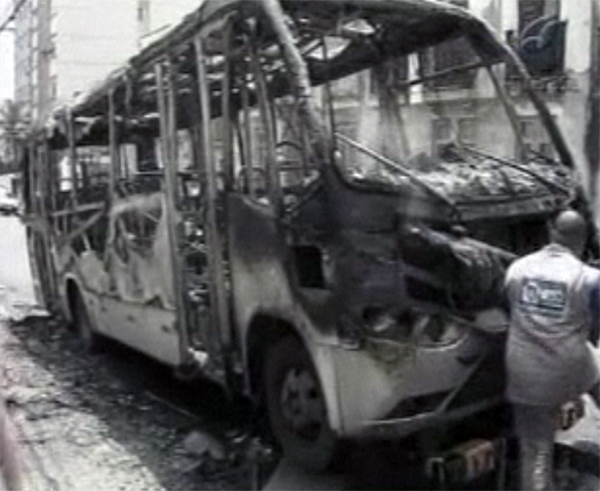
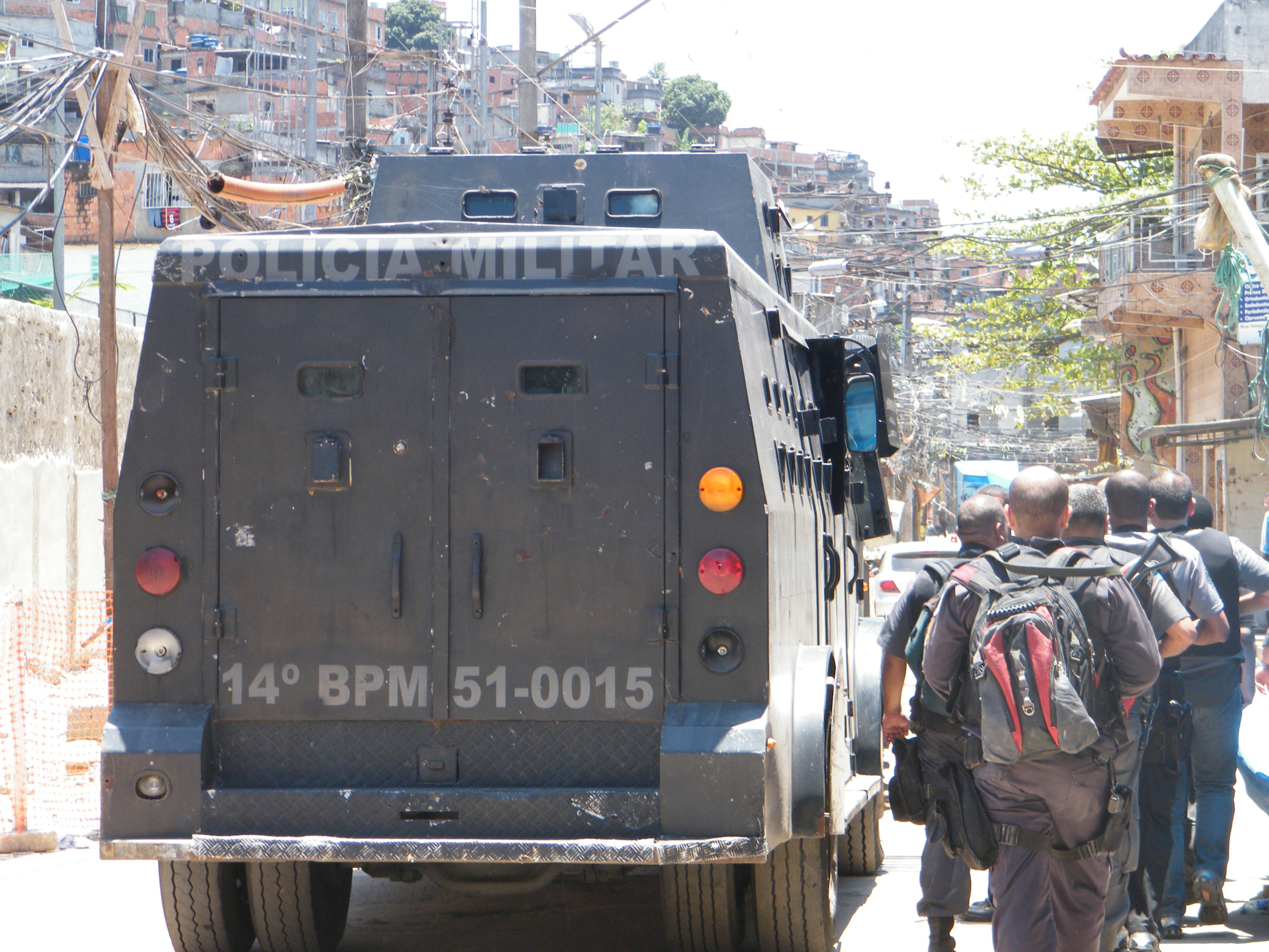
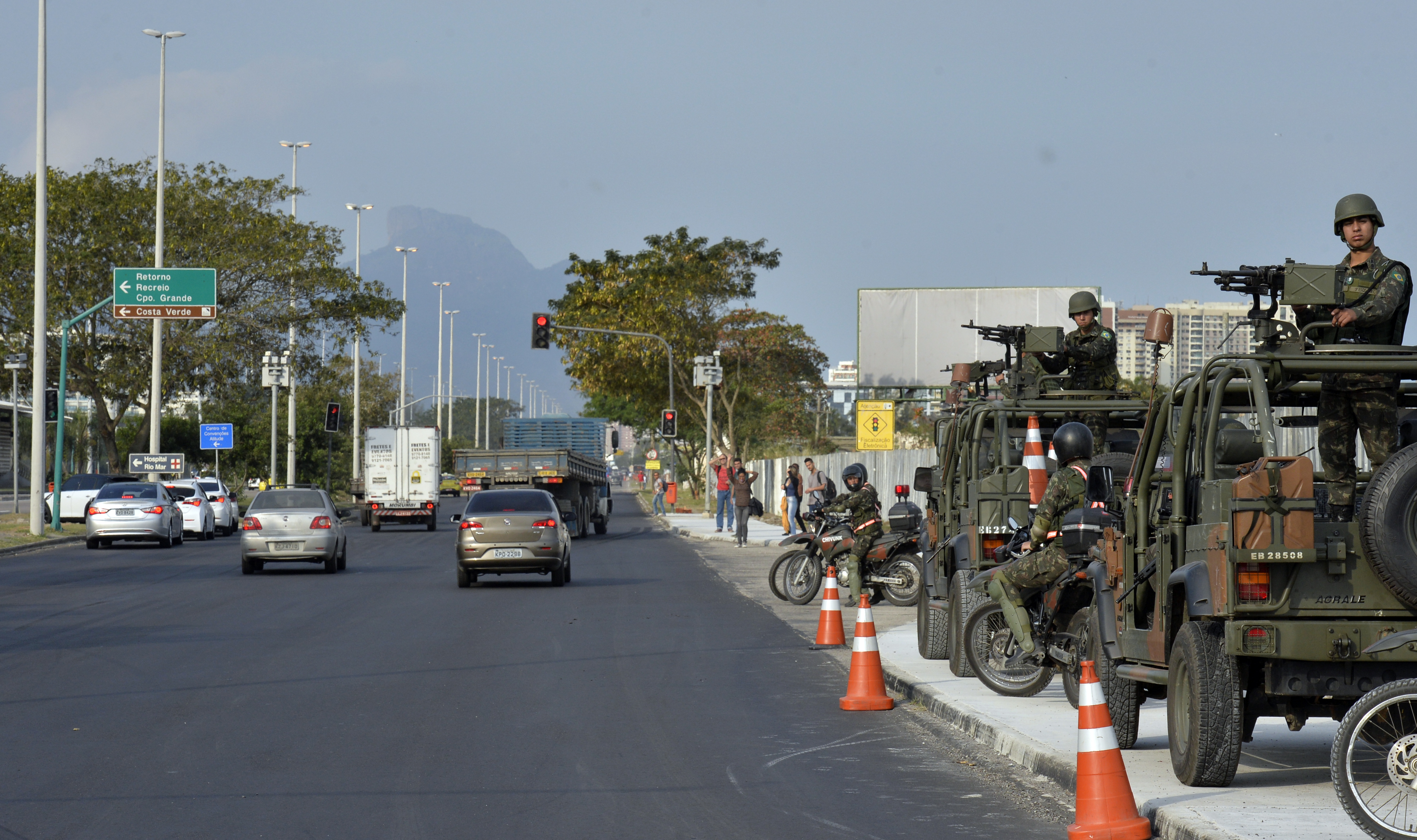
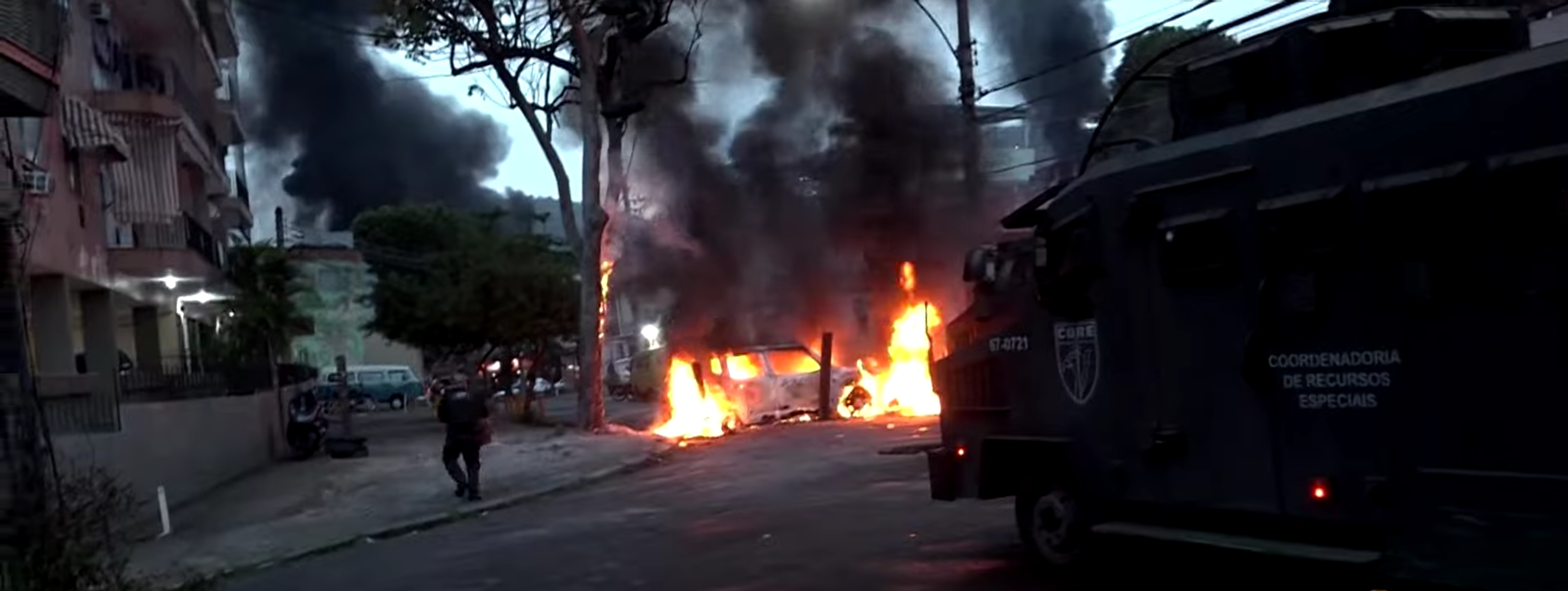
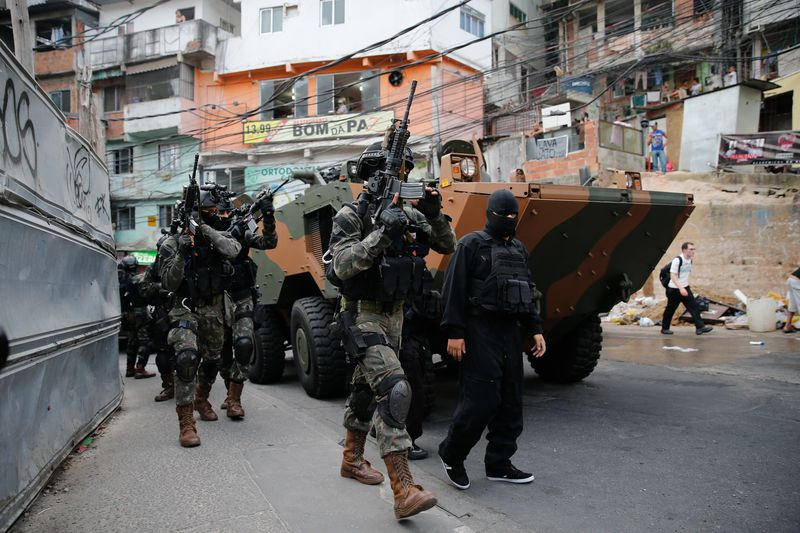
- Clockwise from top left: Soldiers patrolling the Complexo do Alemão during a police operation; Bus set on fire by cartel members in response to the occupation of Complexo da Penha; Military police entering Complexo do Alemão; Soldiers providing security for the 2016 Olympics in Rio de Janeiro; CORE armored car next to a vehicle set ablaze during Operation Containment; Security forces patrol the Rocinha favela
Date	2 October 1992 – present (Note: Other sources mention the cocaine boom of the mid-late 1980s or the founding of the Comando Vermelho (1979) and Primeiro Comando da Capital (1993) factions as the breaking point for the spread of organized crime in Brazil.)
Location	Brazil (Note: With occasional spillover into other states and regions such as Argentina, Uruguay, Paraguay, Bolivia, Peru, Colombia, Venezuela, Portugal West Africa, and the Guyanas.)
Status	Ongoing

Belligerents
(Brazil) Federal Government; Federal Police; Federal Highway Police; National Force; Armed Forces; (Rio de Janeiro (state)) (São Paulo (state)) State and municipal forces; Municipal Guards; Civil Police; Military Police	Brazilian cartels; CV; PCC; TCP; ADA; FDN; GDE; BDM; PGC; SDC; B40; Foreign Groups; Group America; Tren de Aragua; Triads; 'Ndrangheta	Militias/Death squads; Liga da Justiça; Escritório do Crime; Bicheiros

Commanders and leaders
Lula da Silva (Note: President of Brazil and Commander-in-chief of the Armed Forces (2003–2011, 2023-present)); Geraldo Alckmin (Note: Vice President of Brazil (2023-present)); José Múcio (Note: Minister of Defence (2023-present)); Renato Freire (Note: Chief of Staff of the Armed Forces (2023-present)); Tomás Ribeiro Paiva (Note: Commander of the Armed Forces (2023-present)); (Brazil) Wellington Lima e Silva (Note: Minister of Justice (2026-present)); Full list: Dilma Rousseff (2011–2016); Michel Temer (2016–2019); Jair Bolsonaro (2019–2023); Hamilton Mourão (2019-2023); Nelson Jobim (2007-2011); Celso Amorim (2011-2014); Walter Braga Netto (2021-2022); Paulo Sérgio Nogueira (2022-2023); (Brazil) Sergio Moro (2019-2020); (Brazil) André Mendonça (2020-2021); (Brazil) Anderson Torres (2021-2023); (Brazil) Flávio Dino (2023-2024); (Brazil) Ricardo Lewandowski (2024-2026)	André Macedo Oliveira; Álvaro Malaquias Santa Rosa; Edgard Alves de Andrade; Luciano Martiniano da Silva; Full list: Marcos Willians Herbas Camacho (surrendered); Gilberto Aparecido dos Santos (surrendered); Elaine Souza Garcia (surrendered); José Márcio Felício #; Márcio dos Santos Nepomuceno (surrendered); Luiz Fernando da Costa (surrendered); Rogério Avelino da Silva (surrendered); William Sousa Guedes (surrendered); Marcelo Fernando Pinheiro Veiga (surrendered); Marcelo Soares de Medeiros (surrendered); Elias Pereira da Silva ‡‡; Antônio de Souza Ferreira X; Eduíno Eustáquio de Araújo X; Marcelo da Silva Leandro †; Rayane Nazareth Cardozo da Silveira †; Douglas Donato Pereira †; Róbson André da Silva #; Márcio José Sabino Pereira †; Fernando Gomes de Freitas †; Antônio Francisco Bonfim Lopes (surrendered); Celso Luís Rodrigues (surrendered); Alexandre Bandeira de Melo (surrendered); Luciano Oliveira Felipe X; Celso Pinheiro Pimenta †; Rogério Rios Mosqueira †; José Roberto Fernandes Barbosa (surrendered)	Aniz Abraão David; Ailton Guimarães Jorge; Marcelo Zaturansky Nogueira Itagiba; Jairo de Souza Santos; Lúcia Helena Pinto de Barros; Full list: Domingos Inácio Brazão (surrendered); João Francisco Inácio Brazão (surrendered); Rivaldo Barbosa de Araújo Júnior (surrendered); Ronnie Lessa (surrendered); Jairo Souza Santos Junior (surrendered); Hélio Albino Filho (surrendered); Francisco Wallace Cavalcante de Souza #; Jorge Luis Hauat #; Josinaldo Francisco da Cruz X; Adriano Magalhães da Nóbrega †; Natalino José Guimarães (surrendered); Ricardo Teixeira Cruz (surrendered); Álvaro Lins dos Santos (surrendered); Antônio Petrus Kalil #; Luiz Pacheco Drummond #; Marina Terra Maggessi de Souza #

Casualties and losses
- 50,000+ killed

The Brazilian drug war is an ongoing conflict fought mainly between police militias, drug cartels and federal (or state) security forces in Brazil.

== Background ==
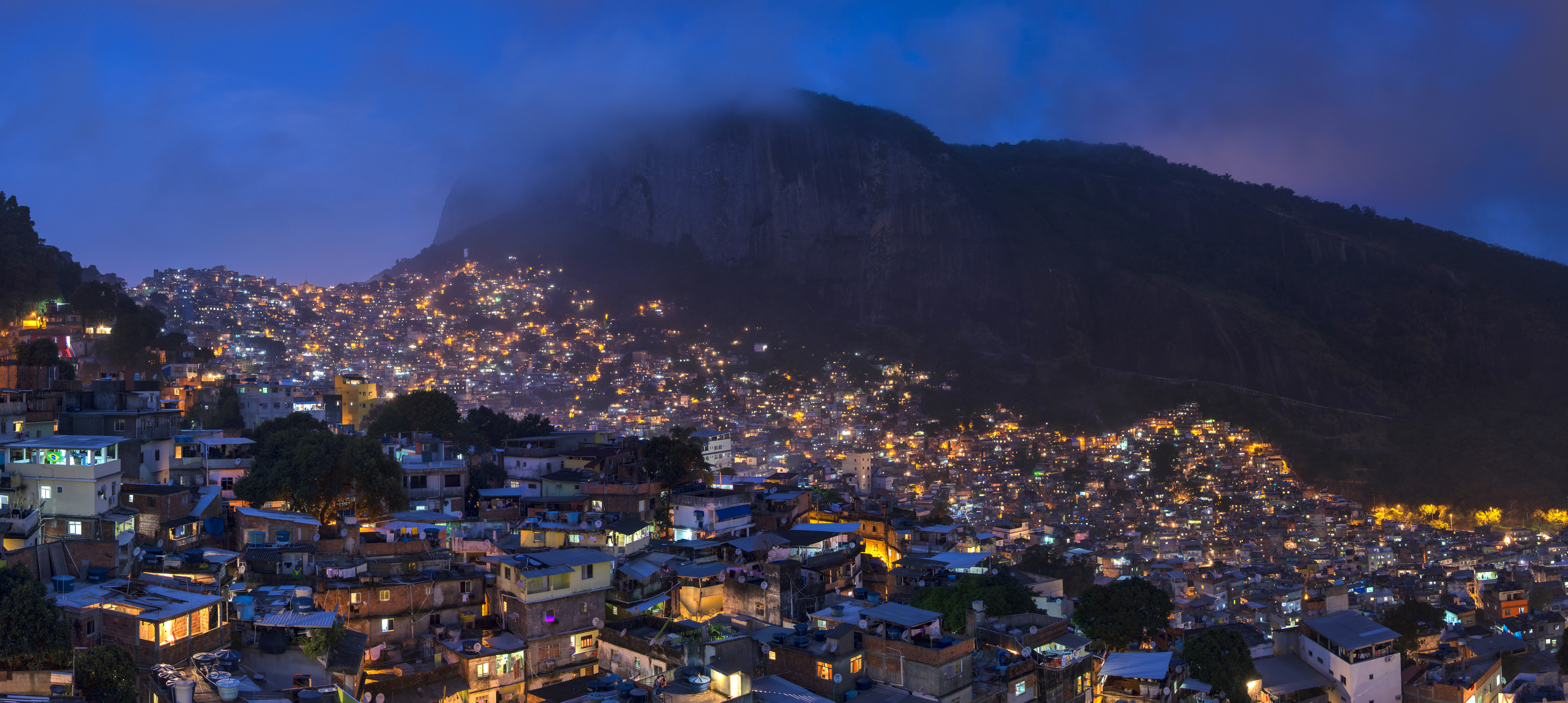
Panorama night image of Rocinha, the largest favela in Rio de Janeiro

Organized crime is heavily intertwined with the geography of the largest cities in Brazil, particularly in their poorest neighborhoods, commonly known as favelas. Many Brazilian cities have their wealthiest and most tourist-driven communities located close to informal neighborhoods that face high rates of poverty, drug addiction, unemployment, violence and homelessness; This extreme economic inequality and lack of proper social services in these areas facilitates the formation and survival of organized crime, which is present in every Brazilian state. Residents of these neighborhoods frequently face social stigma, which is commonly intertwined with racism, social segregation and class discrimination; The lack of both proper education and formal job opportunities caused by this social discrimination also causes organized crime to grow even further.

Criminal organizations often rely heavily on relationships with both political and state actors to advance their influence. These relations usually involve large-scale corruption, such as bribery and the use of informal favours or personal connections to achieve control over many government institutions, such as the police and judiciary. Members of some security forces, particularly of the Civil and Military polices, have also formed their own criminal organizations, popularly known as "militias". Large businesses, particularly in the finance, real estate and oil sectors, are also known to be heavily intertwined with organized crime in Brazil, in many cases using shell companies and other means to perform money laundering for these organizations.

Despite these known links between state forces and organized crime, public opinion, especially among the upper and upper middle classes, is largely in favour of the state using armed force to combat these criminal organizations. This is also exacerbated by many sensationalist TV programs, which use explicit and violent imagery to amplify these sentiments throughout the country. Despite their own links to criminal organizations, many far-right political candidates have also taken advantage of this situation to be elected into public office.

=== Rio de Janeiro ===
Beginning with rackets such as Jogo do Bicho, Rio de Janeiro has had many incidents of collusion among criminal organizations and social and political institutions. Following the military dictatorship, political tools originally used by the regime, such as the Cândido Mendes prison complex, created the first prison gangs in Rio in the late 1970s-early 1980s. With the subsequent cocaine boom in South America, these gangs would go on to unite or incorporate smaller street gangs and other groups, while also dominating the drug market and capitalizing off it within favela communities. Heightened tensions for control of these neighborhoods contributed to turf wars and new factions of organized crime forming.

=== Drug policy in Brazil ===
Laws prohibiting the recreational use of drugs, such as cannabis, coca and opium, were introduced to the Penal Code of Brazil in 1940, when certain narcotic drugs were criminalized within Brazilian territory through the 1940 Penal Code (Law No. 2,848/1940), as set forth in Article 281:

To import or export, sell or offer for sale, supply—even gratuitously—transport, carry, keep in storage, store, administer, or in any way deliver for consumption any narcotic substance, without authorization or in violation of legal or regulatory provisions.

This article rendered these drugs illegal and thus authorized police powers and regulatory bodies to impose sanctions on users and traffickers of illicit drugs. Even before their legal prohibition, narcotic drugs were already shrouded in prejudice—particularly racial prejudice, such as in the case of marijuana, which was nicknamed "Angola weed", because it was mainly used by adherents of Afro-Brazilian religions in their rituals.

In 1973, when Brazil acceded to the Convention on Psychotropic Substances, the "war on drugs" shifted its approach; the new drug policies clearly defined the penalties and consequences associated with possessing, purchasing, or selling these substances. It was in the Brazilian state's interest to marginalize and prohibit narcotics, given that during the 1968 student marches against the military dictatorship, drugs had been used as a symbol of resistance against the regime—and, due to the lack of clear penalties, users faced neither prosecution nor punishment.

== Major events ==
=== Rio drug war ===
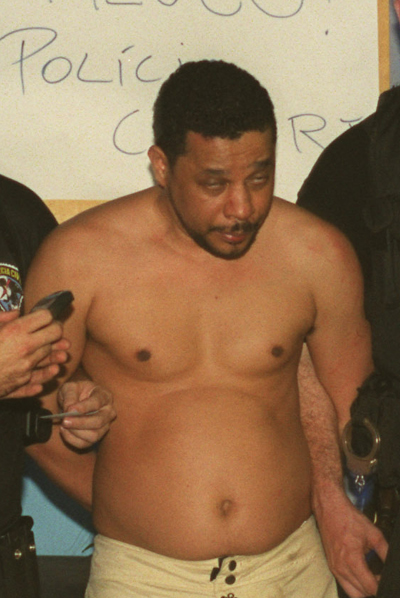
Elias Pereira da Silva (Elias Maluco) after being arrested by police in 2007

The militias emerged in the mid-late 1990s, being composed mainly of off-duty police officers and ex-military, in many cases also receiving assistance from local businessmen and residents looking for protection from criminal groups. The Comando Vermelho, as a response, began carrying out terrorist attacks against civilian targets between 27 and 31 December 2006, during these attacks, 19 people died, being 10 civilians, 2 policemen and 7 gang members. As retaliation, the militias conducted several raids against the Comando Vermelho, killing more than 100 gang members. These groups launched several attacks between January 2007 and March 2008 against Comando Vermelho, conquering the Cidade Alta favela on 4 February, three days later it was recaptured by the Comando Vermelho commanded by Gilberto Martins da Silva (known as "Mineiro da Cidade Alta"), with at least 20 gang members being killed in subsequent clashes. The militias obtained a "Caveirão" (an armored vehicle used by the Battalion of Special Police Operations (BOPE) for high-risk operations) in January of the same year.

According to some investigations, the militias mainly finance their armed struggle with illegal activities, such as extortion, kidnapping, loan sharking, racketeering, gambling, pimping, contract killing and arms trafficking. In May 2008, the militias, commanded by Coronel Jairo, kidnapped and tortured a group of journalists from the Brazilian newspaper O Dia who were reporting the criminal activities perpetrated by the militiamen. After 7 hours of torture, they were released. In that same month, in clashes between the Comando Vermelho and the militias, 10 people were killed. Residents were threatened by the fighting groups and the president of an association for local residents was kidnapped and subsequently disappeared. On 5 August, one of the leaders of the militia, Carlos Alexandre Silva Cavalcante, known as "Gaguinho", was killed. On 20 August 2008, the militias carried out a massacre which resulted in the death of 7 people in the Carobinha favela in a false flag operation aiming to frame the Comando Vermelho for the massacre. There was also an attempt to enforce the political candidacy of Carminha Jerominho, daughter of Jerônimo Guimarães Filho, alias "Jerominho", the leader of a militia faction.

On 5 October, "Mineiro da Cidade Alta" was killed by the militias for the murder of several militia members. From 2007 to 2008, three politicians were arrested for providing support to the militias: Josinaldo Francisco da Cruz (known as "Nadinho de Rio das Pedras"), Natalino José Guimarães and his brother Jerônimo Guimarães. On 9 June 2009, Josinaldo Francisco da Cruz was killed. Despite initially being opposed to drug trafficking, many militia groups (such as the "Liga da Justiça" faction) have allied themselves with cartels like the TCP, while also recruiting many former drug traffickers, informants and ex-convicts into their ranks, sometimes through coercion.

==== Invasion of Morro dos Macacos ====
The Morro dos Macacos is one of the most violent favelas in Rio de Janeiro, the community was invaded by CV on 17 October 2009, while it was still under the control of ADA, who clashed with Comando Vermelho members to contend for territory, 5 gang members were killed in the clashes from 11 to 17 October. In order to stop the clashes between the two groups, about 150 assault troops of the Special Operations Department of the Polícia Militar were dispatched for security purposes. In an attempt to prevent the intervention of the police in the ongoing feud, criminals built makeshift barricades at several key points and subsequently set them on fire.

On 17 October, in the morning, the rear propeller of a Fenix helicopter patrolling above the community was shot and severely damaged by drug traffickers of Amigos dos Amigos. According to some sources, the weapons used in the attack were a bazooka and several machine guns. The helicopter crashed, killing 2 soldiers on impact, with another soldier later dying of his wounds. This attack sparked widespread retaliations by police and militias against drug cartels and civilians in the region, with massacres occurring from 17 to 25 October 2009, resulting in at least 45 deaths. During these attacks, Brazilian authorities admitted to corruption and brutality among the police force, including the illegal release of two narcos perpetrated by some policemen; confirming also the existence of these armed militias who compete against drug traffickers and gangs for control of the drug market.

==== Formation of the UPP ====
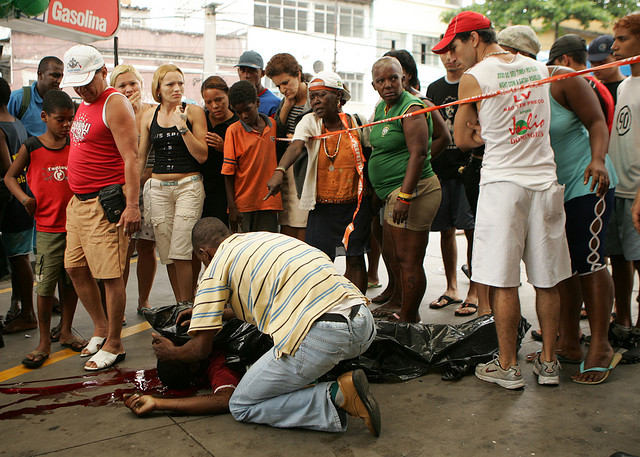
Father cries over the body of his dead son, who was murdered while refueling his motorcycle at a gas station

The Unidade de Polícia Pacificadora (Pacifying Police Units) or UPP was a security program in Rio de Janeiro that aimed to reclaim favelas from criminal organizations, such as CV, ADA, and TCP, through community policing. The strategy worked in two parts: deployment of the Military Police of Rio (PMERJ) into the favelas, and then increasing the amount of police officers who were meant to interact with the community through units, in hopes of creating a healthier relationship between favela residents and law enforcement than what existed in years prior. For decades, interactions with police in Rio de Janeiro were abrasive; violent conflicts between drug traffickers and the police led to widespread civilian casualties, and numerous instances of abuses of power by the police led to a general distrust by favela residents. The creation of the UPP aimed to both restructure the police force and its interactions with civilians, while also deterring criminal activity leading up to the 2014 World Cup and 2016 Summer Olympics. A secondary component of the UPP plan was the creation of UPP Social, which aimed to address the social welfare needs of the favelas by UPP units. This included improvements to sanitation, education, and healthcare, among other social issues.

In 2008, the first UPP was set up in the Santa Marta favela, with more quickly following -- coalescing in 32 units overall, spanning all of Rio de Janeiro's zones (though most were located in Zona Norte). Despite urges for increased financial support, the UPP units amassed praise in their early years for evident decreases in both visible crime and violence within the favelas they were operating in. Because military presence was a precursor to actual UPP units, many drug traffickers fled occupied favelas to avoid persecution or capture by the Military Police tactical unit, BOPE. Because of this, crime rates significantly dropped for a couple years. In interviews with residents, details of the freedoms they were allowed once UPP units were installed continued to highlight the successes of the project.

==== Amarildo Souza, UPP abuses and backsliding ====
Despite early success, some of the main hindrances of the UPP project were police abuses and disappearances that occurred. One of the most prominent cases of this was the disappearance of Amarildo Souza, a bricklayer from the Rocinha favela. Souza, 42, had been fishing the morning of his disappearance and decided to go into the favela to get produce when he was confronted by UPP officers. Souza was taken for questioning and subsequently never returned home.

Souza was well known throughout Rocinha, leading to public outcry at his disappearance and a lack of response by the UPP unit. After more than two months of public outcry, an investigation was opened into his disappearance, where twenty-four UPP officers and the UPP commander were found accused of torture, concealing a body, procedural fraud, and conspiracy. In the subsequent trial, twelve officers would be found guilty of torture, procedural fraud, and concealing a body.

Despite the investigation and criminal case, the UPP suffered weakened support from favela residents, who felt both anger and fear at the actions of the local UPP unit. Coupled with insufficient training and poorly strategized growth of the units, the UPP continued to fail as insignificant funding heavily derailed the project, which could not perform what it was intended to. With the weakening of the UPP, criminal organizations could again attempt to reclaim their territories through shootouts and confrontations, but were this time more successful.

==== 2010–present ====
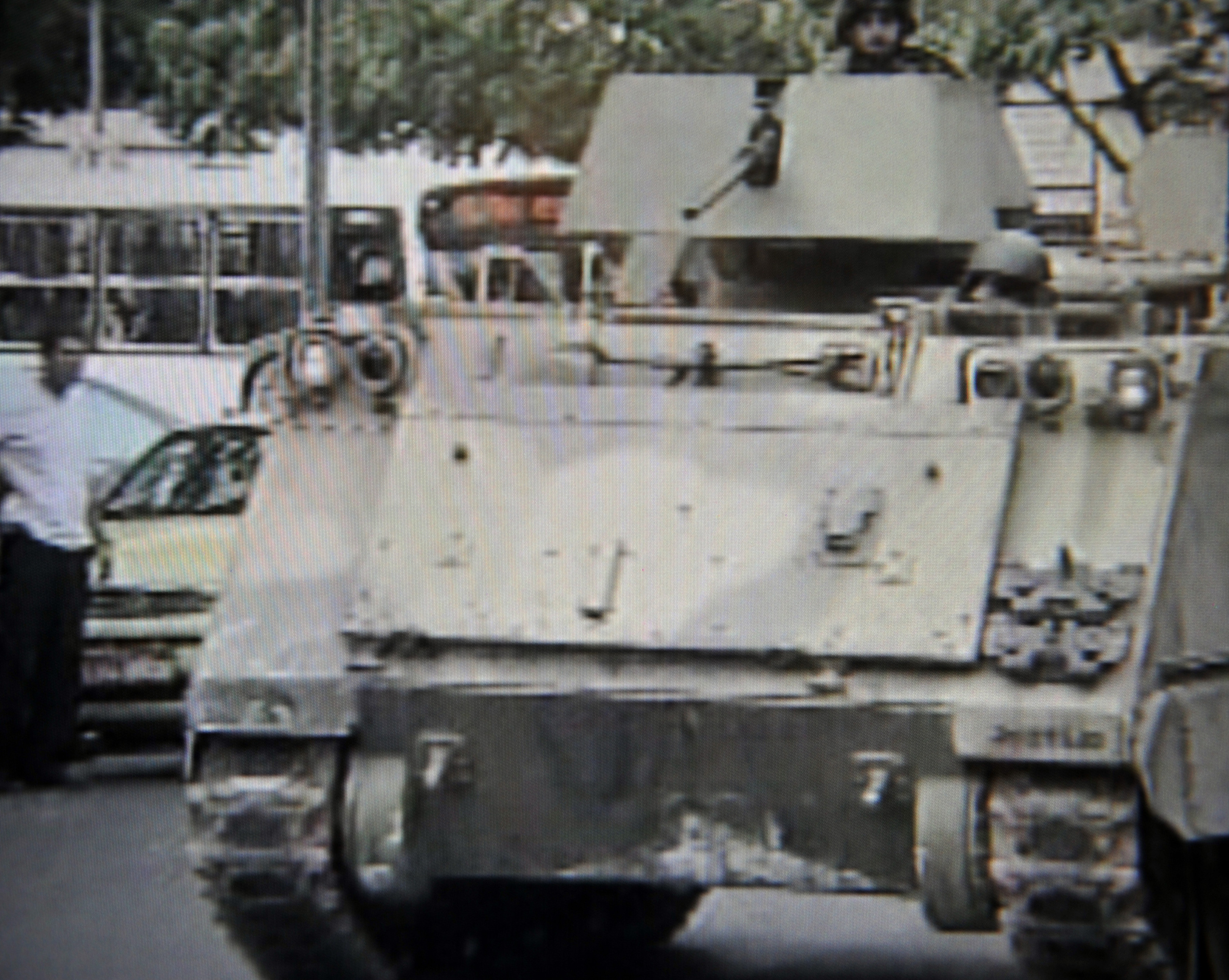
Brazilian army M113 armored vehicle in Rio de Janeiro, 2010

After the battle, there were other several clashes between militiamen and gang members. Throughout the 2010s there were several arrests and convictions against militiamen and drug traffickers involved in the massacres. The militias managed to conquer several territories under the control of the Comando Vermelho, although some of them later returned to the gang's control after being reconquered during clashes. In November 2010, another massacre occurred between the military police and the CV, resulting in the deaths of 41 people. On 1 February 2012, during a raid conducted by the Polícia Militar (PM), a "Caveirão" was destroyed by the Comando Vermelho in the favela of Jacarezinho, no injuries were reported. During the course of the massacre, the CV and the militias began recruiting child soldiers. On 19 November 2016, during an operation of the PM, a military police helicopter was shot down by Comando Vermelho in the favela of Cidade de Deus, in the crash four policemen died. On 9 February 2020, a prominent militia faction leader, Adriano Magalhães da Nóbrega, also known as "Capitão Adriano" or "Gordinho", was seriously injured in a police operation and later died in a hospital. On 15 October, in one of the deadliest operations against militias, the PM clash with a convoy of the militias killing 12 paramilitaries on Itaguaí, also a policeman was injured. In the Morro do Fubá favela, the residents were forced to pay a monthly fee of 50 brazilian reals as part of a protection racket. On 17 May 2022, militias attacked a civilian helicopter that was flying over the Rio area with rifles. No injuries were recorded but the helicopter suffered slight damage. On 20 August of the same year, Delson Lima Neto, brother of one of the leader of the militias, Tandera Danilo Dias Lima, was killed alongside 3 paramilitaries soldiers by the Polícia Militar on Nova Iguaçu, in Baixada Fluminense, after his death the Comando Vermelho conquered the favela of Grão-Pará, in Nova Iguaçu. After the raid, on 23 August, the police found and seized an improvised fighting vehicle (similar to a Caveirão) used by the militias to fight against Comando Vermelho in Nova Iguaçu.

According to law student Carlos Gilberto Martins Junior of Brazil in 2023, with emphasis on the State of Rio de Janeiro, there has been an arbitrary use of these powers and attributions, conferred on police institutions, to satisfy the patrimonial aspirations of some of its agents, through territorial domination and violence, to the detriment of the peripheral communities and under the pretext of saving them from the "greater evil" represented by drug trafficking, corroborating the emergence of criminals organizations what conventionally called the "militia".

On 6 May 2021, at least 29 people were killed in a shootout between gangsters of Comando Vermelho and police. On May 24 2022, the BOPE raided the Vila Cruzeiro favela in Penha Complex, killing 26 people between civilians and gangsters of Comando Vermelho. On March 23 2023, Brazilian police raided the Salgueiro favela in São Gonçalo, Rio de Janeiro, killing Leonardo Costa Araujo, the head of CV in Para, and other 12 gangsters. On September 4 2025, eight members of the Terceiro Comando Puro were killed in a shootout with police in Rio de Janeiro. Later, on October 28, 2025, against the backdrop of COP30, Brazilian police launched Operation Containment on Comando Vermelho spots in Rio de Janeiro, arresting at least 81 suspected gang members while resulting in the deaths of more than 132 people, including four police officers and at least 17 residents without prior criminal records. On 14 January 2026, four people were killed in a police operation against the Comando Vermelho in the Salgueiro favela of Rio de Janeiro. On 18 March, eight people, including Comando Vermelho commander Claudio Augusto dos Santos, were killed in police raids across Rio de Janeiro.

=== PCC-CV war ===
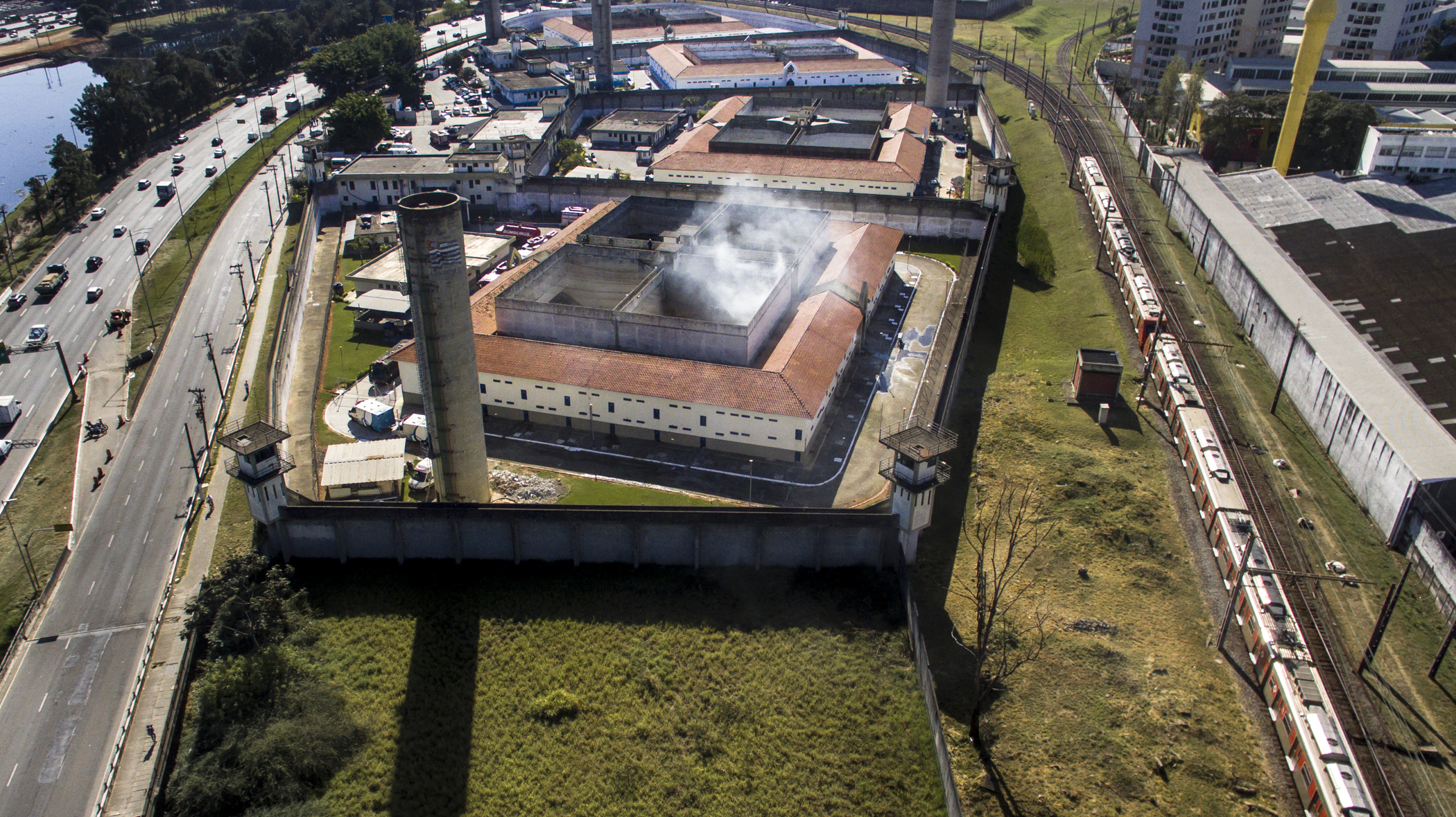
The Provisional Detention Center of Pinheiros in São Paulo after a prison riot

In 2016, the breakdown of a 20-year truce between the PCC and the Red Command (CV) led to a massive uptick in violence across Brazil, with the PCC embarking on an aggressive expansion campaign by absorbing less organized gangs and financing local groups to operate as proxies against the CV across the country, such as the B13 gang in Acre and CV's rivals in Rio de Janeiro and the Northeast (such as ADA, BDM, GDE and TCP).

Between 2016 and 2020, a series of gruesome prison riots made headlines worldwide as the PCC fought for control of the North Region against the Família do Norte (FDN) faction, allied with the Comando Vermelho. On January 1, dozens of PCC prisoners were massacred at the Anísio Jobim Penitentiary Complex in Manaus after a prison riot, with the PCC retaliating in prison riots in Boa Vista and in Natal in the same week. Dismemberments, beheadings and prisoners being burned alive were commonplace during all three prison riots. Between 2015 and 2018, the FDN and CV formed an alliance to prevent the advance of the Primeiro Comando da Capital (PCC) in Amazonas. In 2018, the alliance dissolved after clashes between both groups in Manaus, leading to a war between CV and FDN. 33 prisoners were killed in the Agricultural Penitentiary of Monte Cristo riot, located in the rural area of Boa Vista, Roraima, also in the North. According to Folha de S.Paulo, the massacre in Roraima was a response of the PCC to the rebellion commanded by the FDN in the Amazon. Even more people were killed later in that same month, with more than 106 fatalities being registered through the region.

Additionally, a battle for control of the Amazon region has intensified between rival groups seeking access to the valuable drug and arms trafficking routes in the Colombia-Brazil-Peru tri-border region, with groups such as CV, PCC, FDN, Tren de Aragua, FARC, Colombian cartels and paramilitary groups (such as the Comandos de la Frontera and the Carolina Ramirez Front) fighting violent turf wars, which contributed to a significant uptick in regional fatalities. In 2023, sources consistently reported frequent violent clashes between the CV and the PCC, as well as other rival groups. The worst PCC-linked proxy war occurred between Guardiões do Estado (GDE) and CV, with more than 10.000 killed during clashes in Ceará. During this proxy war, GDE (with support from PCC and TCP) displaced hundreds of civilians, burned houses and buses, perpetred massacres and committed a series of homicides, kidnappings and assassinations through the state, the most notable being the Cajazeiras massacre, which left 14 killed and 9 injured.

=== Violence outbreak in Espírito Santo ===
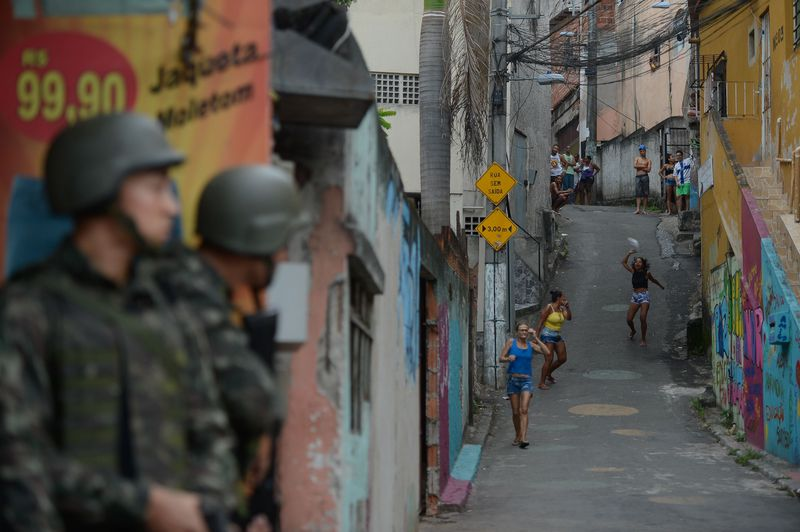
Brazilian soldiers in the streets of Vitória, Espírito Santo

Due to the mutiny of the Military Police of Espírito Santo State in which the agents demanded the correction of the remuneration for inflation, along with retroactive payments, criminal gangs and drug traffickers took advantage of the situation and a crime wave of violence, carjacking and looting spread across Espírito Santo, with most public services and businesses being closed. The Espírito Santo state government called in assistance from the National Public Security Force and the Brazilian Armed Forces to restore law and order in Vitória and other cities until military policemen began to return to their duties after two weeks of strike action. By 25 February, all military policemen in Espírito Santo had ended their strikes. At least 215 people were killed in the violence.

=== Designation of PCC and CV as terrorist organizations ===
In 2026, Donald Trump classified PCC and CV as terrorist groups. Other Latin American countries, mostly members of the US-sponsored Shield of the Americas initiative such as Bolivia, Chile, Colombia, Costa Rica, Dominican Republic, Ecuador, El Salvador, Guyana, Honduras, Panama, Trinidad and Tobago and Peru also followed this decision, officially classifying the groups as narcoterrorist organizations. Argentina and Paraguay had previously also classified these groups as terrorist organizations.

== Criminal organizations ==
=== Drug cartels ===
==== Comando Vermelho ====
Ruins of the Cândido Mendes prison in Rio de Janeiro after its demolition in 1994

Comando Vermelho (Red Command), often abbreviated as "CV", is Brazil's oldest active criminal organization, which engages primarily in drug trafficking and arms smuggling, as well as truck hijacking, loan sharking, pimping, racketeering and bank robberies, among other criminal activities. Considered the biggest faction in Greater Rio de Janeiro, it has also spread to the rest of the state, as well as nearby Espírito Santo and into the north/northeastern regions of Brazil.

The formation of the organization dates back to the late 1970s (during the military dictatorship), on the Cândido Mendes prison (located on Ilha Grande), this penitentiary complex housed both ideological enemies of the regime (such as opposition politicians, journalists, unionists and intellectuals), as well as armed guerrilla fighters (such as members of MR-8 and ALN) and high-profile criminals, which, after a series of massacres and general mistreatment by the prison guards, formed an "self-protective" alliance. Among its founders and first leaders is Rogério Lemgruber, whose name is still honored within the faction.

Through the transfer of major gang leaders by the Brazilian government, the organization was able to gain control of other prisons and establish itself on the ground in most of the state of Rio, gaining much influence within the ever-growing favela complexes. Later, during the cocaine boom of the 1980s, the gang's focus shifted from petty crime to that of drug and arms trafficking, which proved to be less dangerous than bank robberies and also allowed for larger profits and control of many city municipalities.

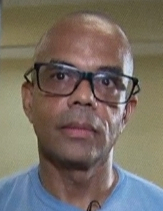
Luiz Fernando da Costa (Fernandinho Beira-Mar), one of the leaders of Comando Vermelho

Ever since the appearance and spread of rival organizations during the late 80s to the early 90s (both in Rio and other states), CV has waged major turf wars against other cartels and street gangs. In recent years it has been involved in a series of prison riots, massacres and territorial conflicts thorough the entire country, which resulted in dozens (or sometimes even hundreds) of casualties, mostly involving police militias (which have grown considerably in the past decade) and rival gangs such as ADA, GDE and TCP.

After negotiations for an "alliance" with São Paulo–based PCC broke down in 2016 (mainly due to disputes between shared drugs and arms trafficking routes in Paraguay, Bolivia and Colombia), a series of retaliations (which included mass shootings, executions and invasions of rival favelas) broke out between both groups and their allies, which have resulted in severe casualties, including not only gang members but also many innocent civilians and security officials who have been caught in the crossfire.

However, despite years of violent conflicts with the Brazilian police and other criminal organizations, as well as deterrent efforts such as the Police Pacifying Unit (UPP) and the occupation of several favelas, the CV maintains significant power and governance in many of Rio de Janeiro's favelas, and, like many other organizations, has increasingly been portrayed as a "cultural icon" in some genres of Brazilian music (such as in the Proibidão, Ostentação and Automotivo sub-genres of Brazilian funk, Trap and Hip-Hop). Current issues for the CV reside in outbreaks of violence with criminal organizations for control of drug routes and turf wars with militias over territories, such as the Complexo do Alemão (which is sometimes considered the "headquarters" of the organization).

==== Primeiro Comando da Capital ====
The Primeiro Comando da Capital (PCC) is one of Latin America's largest drug cartels. The organization primarily deals with drugs/arms trafficking, bank robberies and hijacking of armored trucks, as well as illegal gambling and smuggling (especially alcohol, tobacco, gold and timber). It is the biggest faction in Brazil, while also having a significant presence through the rest of South America, Portugal and the United States (mostly through the Brazilian-American community).

In recent years, the organization has been reported to operate in many other countries as well, mostly through its alliances with foreign criminal groups (such as 'Ndrangheta in Italy, Group America in Serbia, Tren de Aragua in Venezuela, the Triads in China and the Jalisco Cartel in Mexico) and paramilitary groups (such as the FARC in Colombia and EPP in Paraguay). In recent years, there has even been reported activities of the group in West Africa (mostly aligned with local groups such as the Nigerian Mafia), Eastern Europe (through the Russian and Albanian mafias) and the Middle East (through the Turkish and Lebanese mafias). The group has also been alleged to have ties to the Yakuza in Japan and Hezbollah in Lebanon.

The PCC was originally founded on August 31, 1993, by eight prisoners at the Taubaté Penitentiary, known popularly as "Piranhão" (lit. 'Big Piranha'), in the state of São Paulo. The group initially got together during a football game, where they founded a team called "Comando Capital" (lit. 'Capital Command'). The prisoners had been transferred from the city of São Paulo to Taubaté as punishment for bad behavior. The game infamously ended in widespread fights and chaos among the prisoners, leading to a riot which involved the brutal killing and decapitation of both the deputy director and a prisoner with special privileges, the head of the latter being put on a stake. The organization initially claimed it was formed to "combat the repressive acts of police violence" during the Carandiru massacre and soon adopted the slogan "Paz, Justiça e Liberdade" (PJL; lit. 'Peace, Justice and Freedom') as their motto and made use of the Chinese taijitu ("yin and yang symbol") as their emblem, claiming it represents a "way to balance good and evil with wisdom". The organization is also known as "15.3.3" (following the order of the letters "P" and "C" in the former Portuguese alphabet) and "Partido do Crime" (Party of Crime) by some of its members.

In February 2001, Idemir "Sombra" Carlos Ambrósio became the most prominent leader of the organization when he coordinated, by cell phone, simultaneous rebellions in 29 São Paulo state prisons, in which 16 prisoners were killed. "Sombra", also referred to as "father", was beaten to death in the Piranhão five months later by five PCC members in an internal struggle for the general command of the group. The PCC was initially led by Geleião and Cesinha, who were responsible for a short-lived alliance with rio-based Comando Vermelho (CV). At the time, the group adopted many of CV's far-left beliefs and began advocating for revolution and the destruction of Brazil's capitalist system.

Geleião and Cesinha, from the Bangu Penitentiary where they were held, went on to coordinate violent attacks against public buildings. Considered radicals by another moderate current of the PCC, they used terrorism to intimidate authorities of the prison system and were withdrawn from leadership in November 2002, when the faction was taken over by its current leader, former bank robber Marcos "Marcola" Willians Herbas Camacho. Marcola would eventually order the deaths of both Geleião and Cesinha for testifying to the police, as well as for attempting to leave the faction and creating a splinter group called the "Terceiro Comando da Capital" (Third Capital Command, TCC), which is now considered to be defunct.

==== Amigos dos Amigos ====
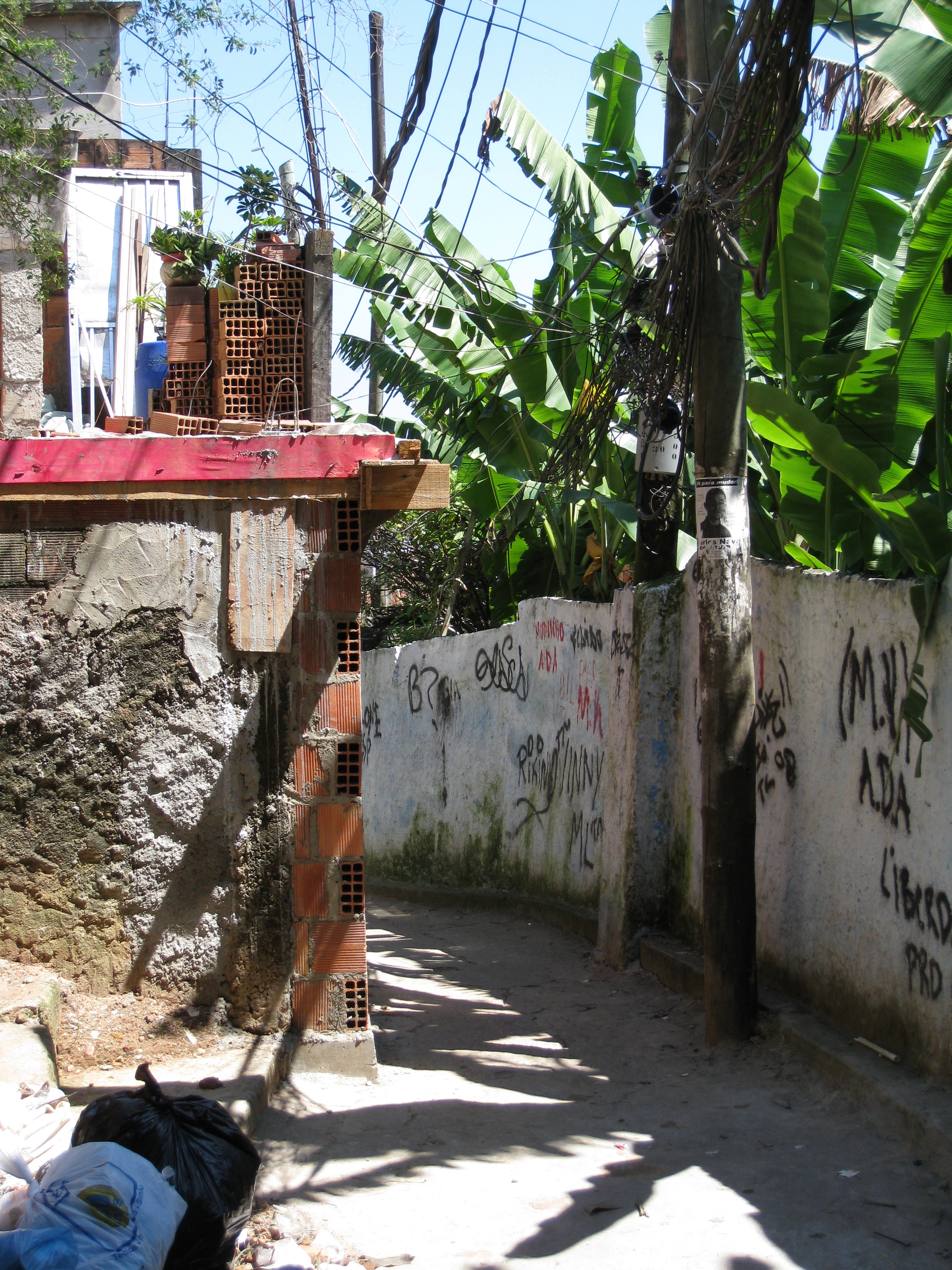
ADA graffiti on the walls of the Rocinha favela

Amigos dos Amigos (Literally "Friends of Friends"), known as "ADA", is one of Rio de Janeiro's most prominent drug gangs, historically having strongholds in Rocinha -- the largest of the favelas in greater Rio de Janeiro. The criminal organization formed in the late 1990s by ex-members of Comando Vermelho -- who were expelled due to the killing of another member -- in order to compete for territorial dominance. CV is still ADA's biggest rival, along with the Terceiro Comando Puro (Third Pure Command, TCP).

in 2004, after the death of the previous "owner" of the Rocinha favela (Luciano Barbosa da Silva, known as "Lulu", one of the "bosses" of the CV faction), ADA drug lord Antônio Bonfim Lopes (also known as "Nem" or "Nem da Rocinha") took control of the region and became the biggest leader in the faction. Under his control, the favela experienced an era of relative calm and peace, while continuously strengthening ADA's drug trafficking schemes and the consolidation of power over political networks and social projects. This included financial and social support for "friendly" political candidates, provision of lacking basic services and the distribution of food baskets to families living in the slums.

Large portions of money were also destined to holding massive parties, "bailes funk" and celebrations, which, according to the police, have been used as important ways to generate not only local entertainment, but also income to these groups, mostly through the illegal commerce of drugs, tobacco and liquor, as well as prostitution, extortion and robberies. Nem's eventual arrest in 2011 led to years of incessant turf wars for control of Rocinha among ADA and CV, which are still ongoing. Although unconfirmed, it is generally thought that Nem still leads ADA operations from within prison.

==== Terceiro Comando Puro ====
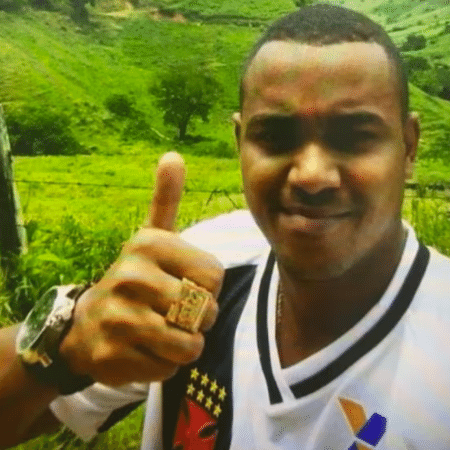
Álvaro Malaquias Santa Rosa (Peixão), one of the leaders of TCP

Terceiro Comando Puro (Pure Third Command) or TCP is yet another of Rio de Janeiro's most powerful organized crime groups, participating in the drug market and extortion. Originating in 2002, the group began as an off-shoot of the Terceiro Comando (Third Command), which no longer operates and was originally a faction formed off of Comando Vermelho.

Although enemies now, Terceiro Comando and Amigos dos Amigos formed an alliance in the late 1990s to overtake territory held by their mutual enemy, CV. Several years later, this alliance crumbled and led to the degradation of the Terceiro Comando, until former leader Nei da Conceição Cruz, alias “Facão, reformed the group in 2002 under the new name Terceiro Comando Puro.

Since then, TCP has maintained territorial control of the northern and western zones of Rio de Janeiro, although they may be attempting to expand their territory through an alliance with São Paulo's PCC, especially following the breakdown of the alliance between PCC and CV in 2016. TCP also engages in continual turf wars with ADA and CV, but have recently gained allies in the form of militias, such as the Liga da Justiça faction.

TCP has also been historically allied with a series of other criminal organizations in the northeast, such as the Guardiões do Estado and the Bonde do Maluco, which has expanded the group's reach beyond Rio, into Espirito Santo, the Northeast and even Pará.

The gang has persecuted adherents of Afro-Brazilian religions and Catholics in its dominated territories. Drug packages belonging to the organization have been marked with the Star of David, Israeli flags were raised and religious symbols (such as the Star of David) were displayed on the walls in several locations alongside the faction's initials.

=== Illegal gambling groups ===
Jogo do bicho (Animal game) is an illegal gambling game in Brazil, which is still incredibly popular and sought out despite its federal prohibition in 1946. The game is played all around the country, with lottery-style drawings in every state occurring daily in its headquarters in Greater Rio de Janeiro. The game is controlled by bosses, called bicheiros or banqueiros ("bankers").

Jogo do Bicho is a longstanding staple in Brazilian culture, with thousands participating in the game daily. Because of its potential to circulate and raise large sums of money, control of Jogo do Bicho is lucrative and largely contributes to corruption, with politicians, judicial personnel, and members of the police force all monetarily and politically benefitting from it. Bicheiros also contribute funding to social programs, such as samba schools, which play a critical role in cultural festivities such as Brazilian Carnival. Because of this, Jogo do Bicho, and in turn its bicheiros, are deeply ingrained in Brazilian culture, especially in Rio de Janeiro, and contribute to the landscape of organized crime and corruption.

=== Militias ===
Brazilian milicias (militias), or paramilitary groups, consisting of current and retired police officers, prison guards, and military members, control much of the western territory of Rio de Janeiro and continue to expand their territory through turf wars with ADA, TCP and CV, both in Rio and in other states, such as São Paulo and the northeast. Militia groups have grown in size and power rapidly, originating in the early 2000s and growing to control highly populated areas since. Founded as vigilante groups, they've amassed enough power as to dominate and extort entire territories of Rio de Janeiro. Along with extortion methods, the groups have gained political influence and have even been previously supported by high-profile politicians, such as former president Jair Bolsonaro.

Unlike the other criminal organizations such as CV and ADA, who have always highly invested in the drug market, militias positioned themselves against drug trafficking in order to gain community approval and trust, with some favela residents seeing them as the "lesser evil" of crime as compared to drug gangs. Instead of drug trafficking, the groups participate in extortion, controlling civilian access to gas, land, and cable television. Recently, some groups have decided to expand to allowing drug dealing within their territories or are doing so themselves, leveraging profit and control of important territories from drug gangs.

== See also ==
- Crime in Brazil
