= 2019 Brazil prison riots =

Criminal gang conflicts in Brazil

- Part of the spillover of the Venezuelan crisis
- Location: Multiple prisons across Amazonas and Pará, Brazil
- Date: May 26, 2019-July 29, 2019
- Attack type: Prison riot
- Deaths: 112
- Perpetrators: Various drug gangs, such as the: Comando Vermelho, Família do Norte; and Primeiro Comando da Capital

Prison riots in Brazil that began on May 26, 2019, resulted in the deaths of at least 112 people as of July 29, 2019. The riots occurred at several prisons in the northern Brazilian state of Amazonas. Rival factions of the illicit Brazilian drug trade were responsible for the fighting. Officials say a nearby drug gang had invaded the wing ran by its rivals in the city of Altamira. 16 prisoners were decapitated and the gang set mattresses on fire. There were others who were asphyxiated in the smoke.

== Prisons ==
=== May ===
- Anísio Jobim penitentiary center, Manaus, 15 killed on May 26, 4 killed on May 27.
- Antonio Trindade penal institute, 25 killed on May 27.
- Puraquequara jail, 6 killed on May 27.
- Provisional Detention Centre for Men, 5 killed on May 27.

=== July ===
- 2019 Altamira prison riot: Altamira jail, Pará, at least 57 inmates killed, including sixteen who were beheaded, during five-hours of rioting between rival gangs on 29 July.

== See also ==
- 2017 Brazil prison riots
