= 2019 Altamira prison riot =

Brazilian prison riot

- Part of the 2019 Brazil prison riots
- 2019 Altamira prison riot (Brazil)
- Location: 03°15′57″S 52°15′16″W; Altamira, Pará, Brazil
- Date: 29 July 2019; 7 years ago
- Attack type: Prison riot, drug turf dispute
- Deaths: 62
- Assailants: Comando Vermelho; Família do Norte; Primeiro Comando da Capital

The Altamira prison riot occurred on 29 July 2019, when a riot broke out at the Centro de Recuperação Regional de Altamira prison in Altamira, Pará, Brazil due to drug turf disputes between rival gangs within the prison.

Over the five-hour conflict, 62 people died. Sixteen people were beheaded, and a fire lit at the beginning of the riot killed 46 more people due to smoke inhalation.

== Background ==
Gang violence in Brazilian prisons is common. However, officials reported that the inmates had shown no signs prior to the riot that they would start something of such magnitude.

The Altamira prison is supposed to hold 200 inmates, but was reportedly holding over 450 at the time of the riot. It was later revealed that the prison only had 33 guards, with the municipality admitting this was nowhere near enough to ensure security. A new structure at the prison was being built to house the excess prisoners, though prison officials deny there was overcrowding and many inmates were held in old container units. The design of these supposedly made the fire worse.

The gangs involved were Comando Classe A (CCA) and Comando Vermelho (CV), with CCA attacking CV. CV is a large Rio de Janeiro-based gang that has a longstanding history of violent confrontation with Primeiro Comando da Capital (PCC), another large national group. Comparatively, the CCA is a small regional gang in Pará. According to The Guardian, the attack was part of a longstanding drug trade turf war that is ultimately between CV and PCC.

== Attack ==
At around 07:00 while breakfast was being served, violence broke out after members from the CCA gang housed in one block set fire to another block which housed members of the CV gang, according to local official Jarbas Vasconcelos. Two prison guards were initially taken hostage, but released soon after the fire had been lit; the gang intended to stop the officers from preventing their targeted attack but did not want to harm them.

Police forces could not enter the building due to the fire. The violence lasted five hours, ending at noon. During prison searches, no firearms were found, only homemade blades. It was reported that gunshots could be heard at the nearby Altamira Airport, with one worker saying that the shooting lasted 30 minutes.

Fifty-seven people were initially reported dead. Sixteen of these were beheaded, while the others died as a result of smoke inhalation from the fire. The prison's poor design meant the fire could spread more rapidly. A charred body was later found buried under the rubble by the Institute of Forensic Medicine of Pará. The death toll rose to 62 after officials found four suffocated inmates inside a prison bus. The bus had been carrying the prison's most violent inmates, who were being transferred to a new prison after the riots.

== Response ==
The Ministry of Justice told media that the main perpetrators will be moved to secure prisons. The total number to be transferred is supposedly 46, with 10 of these going to high-security facilities.
