= 2017 Brazil prison riots =

Criminal gang conflict in Brazil

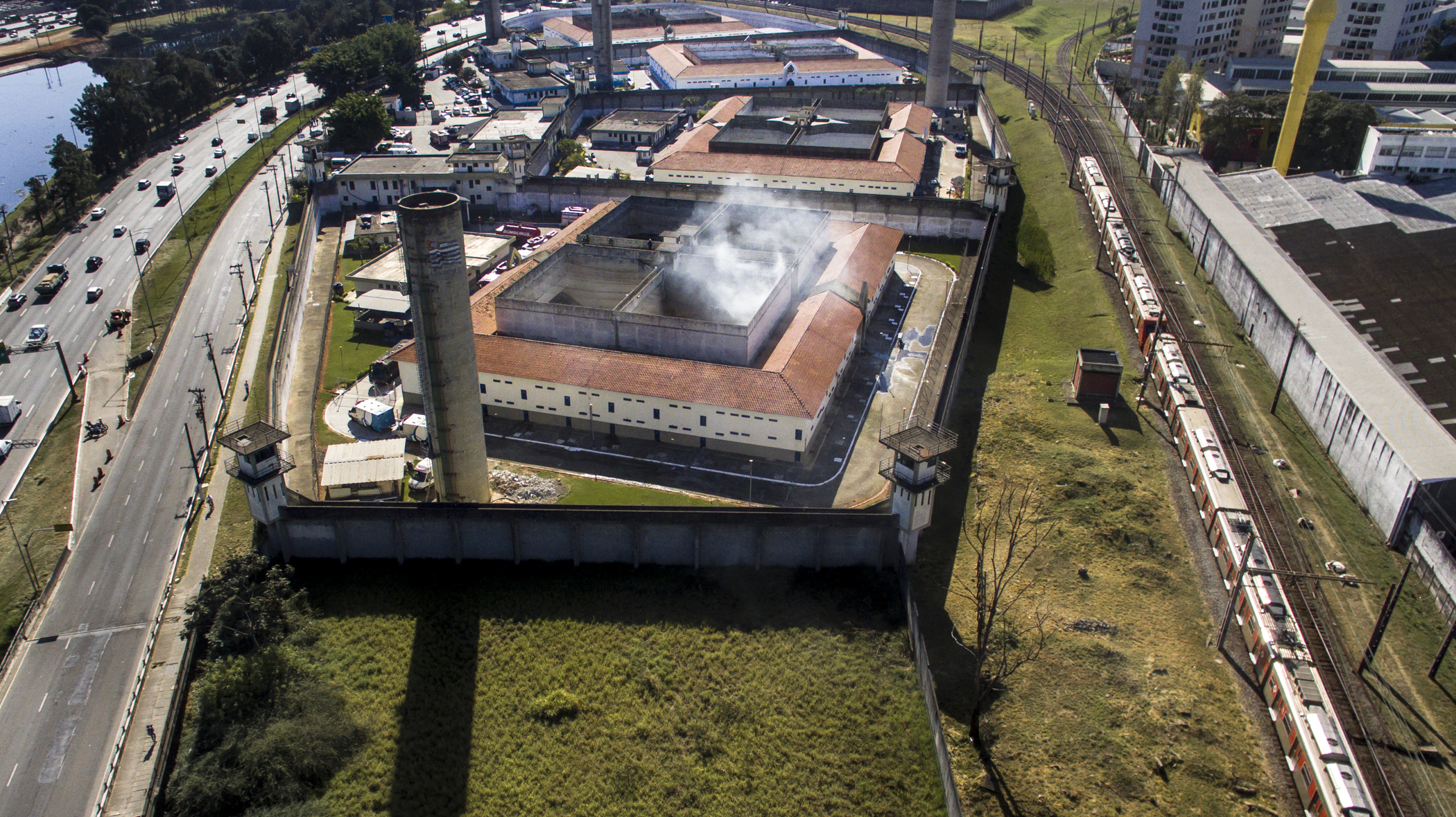
- Aerial photograph of the Provisional Detention Center of Pinheiros in São Paulo after a prison riot.
- Location: Multiple prisons across Brazil
- Date: 1, 8, 24 January 2017
- Attack type: Prison riot, beheading, hostage taking
- Deaths: 100+
- Perpetrators: Primeiro Comando da Capital, Comando Vermelho, and their allies
- Assailants: Família do Norte, Primeiro Comando da Capital, and Comando Vermelho gang members

The 2017 Brazil prison riots were a confrontation between two criminal organizations, the Primeiro Comando da Capital (PCC) and Comando Vermelho (CV), and their allies within prisons and peripheries of Brazilian cities. Its emergence is linked to the methods of the PCC to conquer new territories for drug trafficking, which involve the collection of insurance and economic centralization and whose rigid pseudo-state organization finds strong resistance from regional criminal organizations, with predominantly decentralized organization.

== Riots ==
The confrontation has taken the form of prison rebellions culminating in massacres. At the end of 2016, the first rebellion took place in Roraima with dead detainees. On January 1, 2017, 56 prisoners were killed after a riot at the Anísio Jobim (Compaj) Penitentiary Complex in Manaus, Amazonas, in the northern region of the country. Members of two rival gangs of drug trafficking, the Primeiro Comando da Capital (PCC) and the Família do Norte (NDF) (allied to the Comando Vermelho (CV)) clashed in what was considered the most violent massacre in the history of the Brazilian prison system since the slaughter of Carandiru (1992).

The next day, four more inmates were killed at another prison in Manaus. Five days later, 33 prisoners were killed in the Agricultural Penitentiary of Monte Cristo riot, located in the rural area of Boa Vista, Roraima, also in the North. According to Folha de S.Paulo, the massacre in Roraima was a response of the PCC to the rebellion commanded by the FDN in the Amazon. Even more people were killed later on in the month.

Some of the most recent riots within Brazilian prisons happened in January 2018 in the state of Ceara. These fights broke out because of rivaling gang members, The Guardians of the State and First Capital Command of São Paulo, being in such close quarters in the facility. This riot was just one in a series that has been occurring for a year and a half. At least 10 inmates were killed and eight were injured. The state of Ceara holds the highest number of inmates without conviction or sentencing throughout all of Brazil: two of every three inmates await trial. Inmates are notoriously more agitated throughout the process of awaiting trial, which may explain the high prevalence of fights at the Ceara facility. Yet another riot that took place in January 2018 was in the state of Goias. Authorities claim nine prisoners were killed and 14 injured; one victim being decapitated. 106 prisoners escaped with authorities only recapturing 29 of them after regaining control of the facility. This riot was yet another cause of rivaling gang members being in too close of quarters. In this case, a gang entered the housing unit of a rivaling gang, setting their mattresses on fire and firing off weapons. The staff claims to have moved in quickly to get things under control, but not before 106 of the facilities’ inmates escaped.

== See also ==
- Agricultural Penitentiary of Monte Cristo riot, similar prison riot that occurred in Brazil the previous year
