= Marcinho VP =

Brazilian criminal (born 1970)

- Born: Márcio dos Santos Nepomuceno; February 12, 1970 (age 56); Rio de Janeiro, Brazil
- Organization: Comando Vermelho
- Criminal charges: Drug trafficking, formation of a criminal gang
- Criminal penalty: 36 years in prison in a maximum-security facility
- Criminal status: Incarcerated
- Children: 6, including Oruam

Márcio dos Santos Nepomuceno (born February 12, 1970), best known as Marcinho VP, is a Brazilian criminal identified as one of the two main leaders of the Comando Vermelho criminal organization, alongside Luiz Fernando da Costa, known as Fernandinho Beira-Mar.

== Early life ==
According to his autobiography, Marcinho VP was born in the Vigário Geral favela in Rio's North Zone but moved to São João de Meriti in the Baixada Fluminense region as a baby. Soon after, his father was murdered. His mother was arrested four times, and he and his three siblings were raised by an aunt. He claims he started committing robberies at the age of 13 to buy designer clothes. He then progressed from theft to drug trafficking, rose through the ranks, and quickly became the leading drug lord in the Complexo do Alemão, a group of favelas in Rio's North Zone and one of the main strongholds of the Comando Vermelho.

== Life in prison ==
Processed and convicted for drug trafficking and homicides, Marcinho was arrested at the end of August 1996 in Porto Alegre, Rio Grande do Sul, in an operation led by police commissioner José Carlos Pereira Guimarães, then a member of the Grupo Astra and head of the 5th Metropolitan Regional Division (Metropol 5) of the Civil Police of Rio de Janeiro State. The officer spent four months investigating Marcinho's whereabouts. At the time, the arrest was reported by the press, leading the then governor of Rio de Janeiro, Marcello Alencar, to apologize to the then governor of Rio Grande do Sul, Antônio Britto, for not having informed the state's police about the operation conducted by the Rio officers.

Even while incarcerated, according to police and judicial authorities, Marcinho continued to lead the Comando Vermelho and order homicides and other crimes. One of the alleged victims of his orders was his namesake – Márcio Amaro de Oliveira, also known as Marcinho VP, the leader of the Comando Vermelho in the Dona Marta favela in Botafogo (South Zone).

Prison guards even intercepted a telegram, allegedly sent by Marcinho from Alemão to the other, with the message: "shut up or you'll end up in the ditch." Days later, the Marcinho from Dona Marta was killed by strangulation and abandoned in a trash bin in gallery A3. After the new wave of attacks in Rio de Janeiro began on November 20, 2010, Marcinho VP was transferred to another prison, this time to Porto Velho, Rondônia, along with another trafficker known as Elias Maluco. On November 26, 2010, Marcinho VP's wife was arrested, accused of being the trafficker's "homing pigeon" during conjugal visits. Police accused the two of ordering the attacks in Rio de Janeiro.

== Personal life ==
Married to Marcia Gama, he is the father of six children and grandfather of two grandchildren. Two of Marcinho VP's children are the rapper Oruam and the gospel music singer Débora Gama. Débora Gama has stated that some of her songs are composed by Marcinho VP, who writes the songs and delivers them to his daughter via letter.

Marcinho completed his high school education while in prison. Considered self-taught in the field of law, he has published three books: O Direito Penal do Inimigo. Verdades e Posições (2017), Preso de Guerra (2022), and Execução Penal Banal Comentada (2023). Since 2024, he has been a member of the Academia Brasileira de Letras do Cárcere ("Brazilian Academy of Letters of the Prison"), occupying seat number 1, whose patron is Graciliano Ramos.
