= Maggesi =

Maggesi (also Maggessi and Magessi) is a Italian surname. Notable people with the surname include:

- Francisco de Paula Maggessi, 1st Baron of Vila Bela (1769–1847), Portuguese-born Brazilian general and politician
- António Tavares Maggessi (1771–1843), Portuguese general
- Dominique Fortuné Maggesi (1801–1892), French sculptor
- António Lúcio Maggessi Tavares (1806–1877), Portuguese military officer and writer
- Marina Maggessi (1959–2017), Brazilian police officer and politician
- Júlia Maggessi (born 1998), Brazilian actress
