= Douglas Pereira =

Douglas Pereira may refer to:

- Douglas Donato Pereira (1991–2016), Brazilian drug lord
- Douglas (footballer, born August 1990) (Douglas Pereira dos Santos), Brazilian footballer
