= 2023 Salgueiro raid =

- Part of Armed conflict for control of the favelas
Date	March 23, 2023
Location	Salgueiro, Sao Goncalo, Rio de Janeiro, Brazil
Result	Brazilian victory

Belligerents
Brazilian police: Pará police; Sergipe police; Rio de Janeiro police	Comando Vermelho

Commanders and leaders
Unknown	Leonardo Costa Araujo †

Strength
Unknown	15

Casualties and losses
None	13 killed 2 arrested
- 2 civilians injured

On March 23, 2023, Brazilian police raided a favela in São Gonçalo, Rio de Janeiro in search of drug traffickers from Comando Vermelho. Thirteen drug traffickers were killed in the raid, and two were arrested. The raid was one of the deadliest in Rio de Janeiro history.

== Background ==
Comando Vermelho is one of Brazil's largest drug trafficking cartels. Since 2019, CV militants have killed over 40 police officers in Pará, a northern Brazilian state. The Salgueiro complex, a favela in Rio de Janeiro's Sao Goncalo favela that's home to a million people, was targeted in 2021 in a raid that killed nine people, and a massacre that same year in Jacarezinho.

== Raid ==
The raid was conducted by officers from Para and from Sergipe. The target of the raid was Leonardo Costa Araujo, the head of CV in Para who had been wanted by Brazilian authorities since 2019. Araujo was responsible for the killings of the 40 police officers in Para, and also conducted drug trafficking activities in Salgueiro. Several other smaller leaders for CV in western Rio were targeted as well. A spokesman for the Rio de Janeiro police stated that the raid turned into a shootout, and all Brazilian police vehicles had bullet holes. After the raid, police vehicles drove through Salgueiro until nightfall.

Thirteen people were killed in the raid, including Araujo. Two CV militants were arrested, and two civilian bystanders were injured and taken to the hospital. The raid was tied for the eighth deadliest in Brazilian history, alongside the 1995 Alemao raid, the Morro do Vidigal raid in 2006, and the Catumbi raid in 2007.
