= Agricultural Penitentiary of Monte Cristo riot =

2016 prison riot in Brazil

Coordinates: 2.8931348°N 60.6899236°W

- Date: 16 October 2016
- Location: Agricultural Penitentiary of Monte Cristo, Boa Vista, Roraima, Brazil
- Caused by: Gang rivalry
- Methods: Prison rioting, beheading, arson, hostage taking

Parties
Primeiro Comando da Capital	Comando Vermelho	Brazilian police

Casualties
- Deaths: 25

A riot at the Agricultural Penitentiary of Monte Cristo (Portuguese: Penitenciária Agrícola de Monte Cristo) occurred on 16 October 2016 in Boa Vista, Roraima, Brazil.

Local media, citing police, said that at least 25 inmates died during the riot, with seven of them beheaded and six were burned to death.

== Events ==
According to the Roraima state secretary of justice, the riot began on Sunday 16 October 2016, during visiting hours and an estimated 100 relatives of inmates were taken hostage for a brief time before being freed by police.

The riot was caused by a clash between two rival gangs. The riot was one of several that occurred in Brazilian prisons during 2016.

== See also ==
- 2017 Brazil prison riots
