= Primeiro Grupo Catarinense =

Criminal organization in Brazil

- Founded: 3 March 2003; 23 years ago
- Years active: 2003–present
- Territory: Santa Catarina, Paraná, Mato Grosso and Mato Grosso do Sul (main territory); Paraguay, Bolivia and Argentina (small presence)
- Criminal activities: Drug trafficking, carjacking, fraud, arms trafficking, extortion, money laundering, robbery and kidnapping
- Allies: Comando Vermelho, Bala na Cara
- Rivals: Primeiro Comando da Capital

Primeiro Grupo Catarinense, better known by its acronym PGC (or simply G), is the largest criminal organization in the Brazilian state of Santa Catarina. The faction operates mainly in Santa Catarina and neighboring Paraná, but it also has a presence in at least 2 other Brazilian states (Mato Grosso and Mato Grosso do Sul) and in bordering regions of Paraguay, Bolivia and Argentina. The faction is allied with the Rio-based Comando Vermelho faction, and as a result it has been on constant conflict with its main rival: the Primeiro Comando da Capital (PCC), based in São Paulo. The conflict between both factions escalated in 2016–17, especially after disputes arose over drug routes and territories in the South and Center-West regions of Brazil.

The group is mainly known for its role in orchestrating violent prison rebellions and riots, as well as attacks against state authorities and government officials during the 2012–13 period. It has also targeted other minor factions and street gangs through the state (some of them aligned with the PCC), which in many cases has led to continuous turf warfare and massacres breaking out in the region.

== History and operations ==
=== 2012-13 attacks ===
The group first became notorious to the general public in November 2012, when it claimed responsibility for a series of attacks against public transport and police stations, as well as local businesses and private vehicles. These attacks allegedly occurred in response to the mistreatment of prisoners in the São Pedro de Alcântara Penitentiary. Attacks were reported in at least 16 cities, many of them concentrated in the Greater Florianópolis region. 58 incidents were recorded, 27 of which were attacks on buses, the remainder targeted either military and civil police bases, small businesses or private vehicles. After reports and investigations into mistreatment, overcrowding and an insufficient number of doctors in prisons, the attacks ceased on the orders of the organization's leadership.

The second and largest wave of violence began on January 30, 2013, occurring in at least 36 municipalities across the state. The reason was alleged to be the transfer of members of the faction and the local government's crackdown against drug trafficking. Once again, buses began to be escorted by police to the most critical points, while also operating on reduced schedules. By February 20th, the Military Police had confirmed 111 attacks: both private and public vehicles were set on fire, several public buildings (especially police stations) were damaged by vandalism, with windows and glass doors being broken with gunshots or objects thrown against them and walls being covered with graffiti and paint thrown by suspects. There were also many reported cases of arson during the attacks, with suspects setting fire to stolen bicycles and motorcycles or throwing molotov cocktails against police stations and passing vehicles, most of them buses, many of which had their occupants evacuated at gunpoint before being set on fire.

Many public officials and security workers also reported receiving threats against them or their families, while many important roads in the city were blocked by car tires, trash cans and other objects set ablaze by criminals. The government later had to request assistance from the National Force to quell the attacks, with the violence soon stopping and those arrested as suspects of organizing the attacks (most of them members of the PGC) being transferred to federal maximum security prisons in Mossoró (RN) and Porto Velho (RO).

=== Conflict with Primeiro Comando da Capital ===
Ever since its early days, the PGC has had an ongoing rivalry with the São-Paulo based Primeiro Comando da Capital (PCC), especially following the organization's alliance with the Comando Vermelho (CV) faction, led by Luiz Fernando da Costa (known as Fernandinho Beira-Mar). The conflict is mostly related to disputes over control of drugs and arms trafficking routes, as well as territories in favelas across the state's municipalities.

In the capital, a conflict erupted over control of the Monte Cristo neighborhood, located in the mainland side of the city. The war between drug traffickers from the neighboring communities of Chico Mendes (dominated by PGC) and Novo Horizonte (allied with the PCC) intensified after 2013. The neighborhood is considered the most violent in the city, due to the large number of members of the two rival factions trying to dominate the area. In Florianópolis alone, 60 murders were recorded in 2016 linked to the clash between the two factions.

The conflict also spread to outside of the capital, with the PCC attempting to dominate territory in communities controlled by PGC and other minor factions along the state's coast, where many important ports are located and which could facilitate the export of drugs and weapons into Europe, Asia and North America. Joinville was the first city to get embroiled in the war between these two factions, the homicide rate in the city had a sharp increase at the start of 2017, briefly suprassing São Paulo and Rio de Janeiro. The reason for this increase was reported to be mostly related to the conflict between both groups.

The most high-profile crime in the conflict between the two organizations was the murder of Israel Mello Júnior, who was killed on February 1, 2016. On the day of the crime, the suspects kidnapped two people to serve as a "bait" to lure the victim, the two were taken to the Ulisses Guimarães neighborhood, in the southern part of Joinville. There, in an abandoned house, Israel Mello Júnior was killed, decapitated and had his body thrown in a mangrove area. According to the local police chief, this crime was a result of the war between criminal organizations vying for control of drug trafficking points in the city, one in the South Zone and the other in the North. Therefore, he claimed that the group took the victim's head to another community (which was controlled by the rival faction) as a "show of force" in enemy territory.

== See also ==
- Crime in Brazil
