= Rogério Lemgruber =

Brazilian criminal

- Born: January 5, 1952; Rio de Janeiro, Brazil
- Died: May 29, 1992 (aged 40); Rio de Janeiro, Brazil
- Other name: Bagulhão
- Criminal charges: Formation of a criminal gang, homicide, drug trafficking

Rogério Lemgruber (January 5, 1952 – May 29, 1992) also known as Bagulhão, was a Brazilian bank robber, murderer, kidnapper, and drug trafficker. He founded the criminal organization Falange Vermelha, the predecessor of the group now known as Comando Vermelho, whose full name (Comando Vermelho Rogério Lemgruber) pays tribute to him. His brother, Sebastião Lemgruber, alias Tiguel, and his nephew, Rondinelli, were also members of the organization.

== Biography ==
The son of Jaime Lemgruber and Eulina Rosa, he was born in the Caju favela but moved with his family as a youth to the Sapo favela in the Senador Camará neighborhood, after several families were granted housing there. As an adult, he became the frontman (chief) of drug trafficking. He was one of the founders of the Falange Vermelha criminal organization and its successor, the Comando Vermelho. Within the community, in addition to providing financial help to residents, he encouraged children to read by distributing books and demanding a summary from them, under the threat of being shot in the hand if they failed to do so.

In 1973, at age 21, he escaped from the Presídio-Geral do Estado do Rio in Niterói. Newspaper articles cited him as a "very intelligent" and "highly dangerous" bank robber, capable of "robbing two banks in a single day." During the 1980s, he was tortured in the old Frei Caneca prison, now the Museu Penitenciário do Estado do Rio de Janeiro, as well as in the prison on Ilha Grande, the place where the Falange Vermelha and later the Comando Vermelho began to organize themselves through an alliance between drug traffickers and political prisoners. His name was later added to the criminal organization's. He escaped again in January 1980, April 1985, and May 1987. After being recaptured, he was transferred in August 1987 to the Ary Franco prison, where he was tortured again.

In 1990, while imprisoned in the recently inaugurated Bangu Penitentiary Complex, he led what was to be the first inmate riot at the maximum-security penitentiary. Rogério continued to lead the criminal organization from inside the prison, using his lawyers to send and receive messages from other criminals—a practice that led to the arrest of his lawyer, Sueli Bezerra. Suffering from diabetes, his health began to deteriorate as he struggled to cope with prison life, exacerbated by the repeated cycle of his arrests, escapes, and recaptures. He began refusing the special diet prepared for him by doctors, consuming large amounts of sweets and other foods that spiked his blood sugar.

Thin and debilitated, he was transferred to the Penitentiary Central Hospital for diabetes treatment and was later moved to the Miguel Couto Hospital. His hospitalization completely disrupted the hospital's routine. Authorities were deeply concerned that a rescue attempt by his criminal organization would be easier in a public hospital. Security was heavily reinforced with uniformed and undercover military police officers. All visitors attempting to enter the unit were searched, and six officers were stationed in the ward 24 hours a day to prevent an invasion. After eight days in the hospital, on May 29, 1992, he died from complications of his disease, including kidney failure and hepatic cirrhosis. Rogério was buried the following day in the São Francisco Xavier Cemetery in the Caju neighborhood of Rio de Janeiro's North Zone.

== In popular culture ==
The story of Rogério Lemgruber, due to its connection to the Comando Vermelho, has been portrayed in several films and TV series, among them O Jogo que Mudou a História (2024).
