= Douglas Donato Pereira =

Brazilian drug lord

- Born: 5 May 1991
- Died: 7 March 2016 (aged 24); Acari, Rio de Janeiro, Brazil
- Other name: Dina Terror
- Known for: Drug trade for Comando Vermelho
- Criminal charges: Illegal drug trade; Robbery; Torture; Murder

Douglas Donato Pereira (5 May 1991 – 7 March 2016), also known as Dina Terror, was a Brazilian drug lord, who was killed in a shootout by Brazilian Police.

== Criminal activity ==
Pereira was known for his drug trade within the favela known as Faz Quem Quer in Northern Rio de Janeiro. His weapon of choice was a 9 millimeter. He became the target of police after he kidnapped and killed an 18 year old. The 18-year-old female, Raianne Dantas de Jesus, was a girlfriend of a rival drug dealer. He took on the name the Lord of War, and declared a war on police. He was considered to be a domestic terrorist in Brazil. He was wanted on 10 warrants for his arrest. In March 2016, he was killed by elite Brazilian police. The police force known as Civil police the Coordination of Special Resources (CORE), After the shootout he went over to the Acari Hospital where he died from his wounds.
