= Zé Roberto da Compensa =

Brazilian criminal, drug trafficker serving a 132-year prison term

José Roberto Fernandes Barbosa
- Born: José Roberto Fernandes Barbosa; December 1, 1972 (age 53); Manaus, Brazil
- Other names: "Zé Roberto"
- Known for: Leader of the Família do Norte
- Criminal charges: Drug trafficking and smuggling, murder, organized crime
- Criminal penalty: 132 years imprisonment
- Criminal status: Incarcerated

José Roberto Fernandes Barbosa, or his nickname, Zé Roberto da Compensa is a Brazilian drug trafficker, leader and one of the founders of the Família do Norte criminal faction. He was born on December 1, 1972, he started early in the life of crime, at age 12 he had already been arrested 4 times. In 2018, they reported that he has Depression, Psychotic Break, and Anxiety Disorder.

He consolidated the FDN faction between 2010 and 2012, he is guilty of drug trafficking crimes, murders and a prison rebellion in 2017, which was responsible for 56 dead and 200 fugitive inmates.

== See also ==
- Família do Norte
