= Marina Maggessi =

Brazilian politician

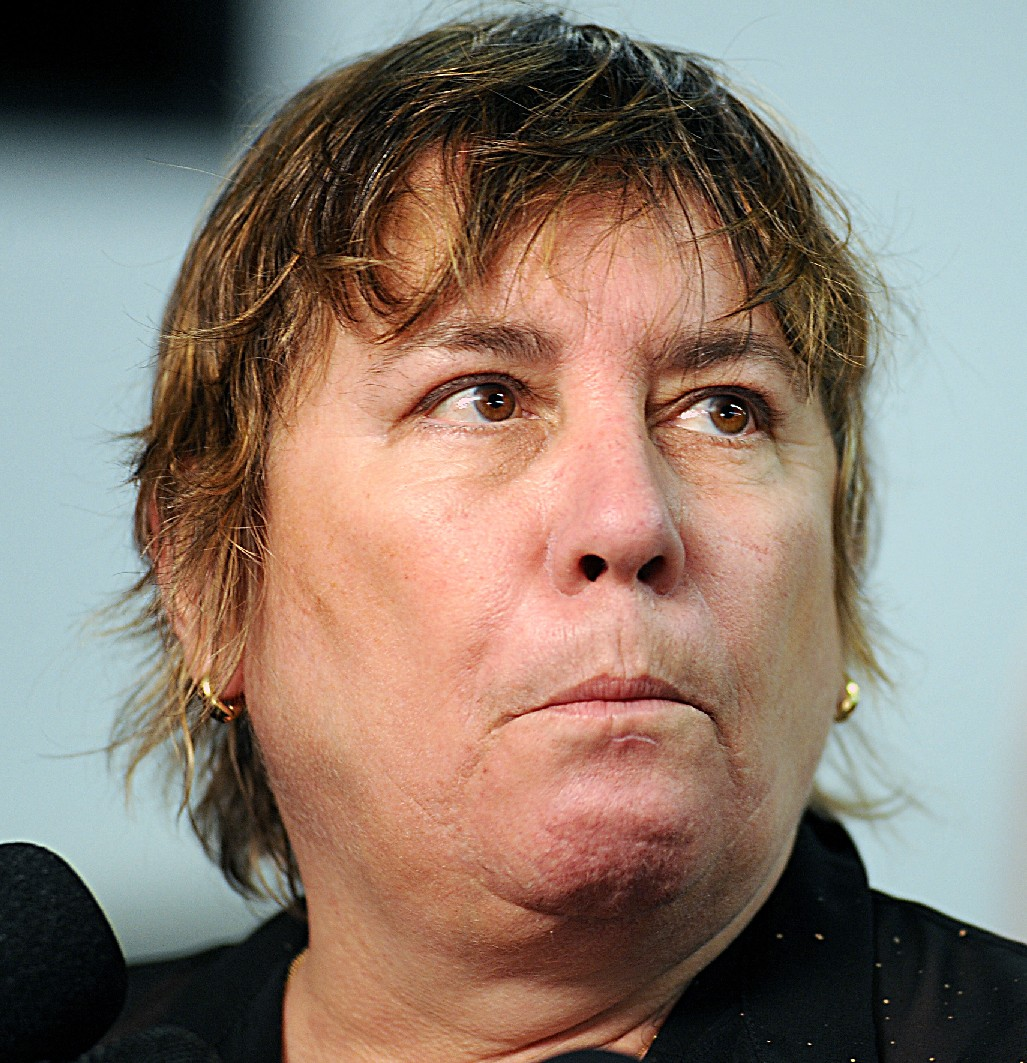

Federal Deputy from Rio de Janeiro
- In office 1 February 2007 – 31 January 2011

Personal details
- Born: 11 February 1959 Rio de Janeiro, Brazil
- Died: 9 June 2017 (aged 58) Rio de Janeiro, Brazil
- Party: Popular Socialist Party
- Profession: Politician

Marina Terra Maggessi de Souza (11 February 1959 — 9 June 2017), commonly known as Marina Maggessi, was a Brazilian police officer and politician, affiliated with the Popular Socialist Party (Cidadania).

== Biography ==
Although Maggessi graduated in journalism, she never practiced the profession. She joined the Civil Police of Rio de Janeiro State as Inspector. When she headed the corporation's Intelligence Coordination, she gained notoriety when her team provided for the arrest of major criminals in Rio de Janeiro at the time, such as Elias Maluco and Uê.

Maggessi made her debut in politics in 2006, when she was elected federal deputy by the Popular Socialist Party, with 55,031 votes. In 2008, she released the autobiographical book "Dura na Queda"-Editora Objetiva. In 2008, during the CPI das Milícias, chaired by state deputy Marcelo Freixo, she was investigated for alleged links with militias. Maggessi was accused of having campaigned in the Rio das Pedras favela in Jacarepaguá, while still serving as Inspector of the Civil Police, with support from the paramilitary group that controls the region. From 2009 to 2010, she chaired the House's Public Safety and Combating Organized Crime Committee. In 2010, she decided to no longer run for the Chamber of Deputies.

== Death ==
Maggessi died from multiple organ failure on 9 June 2017, at the ICU of Hospital São Francisco in Providência de Deus in Rio de Janeiro, where she was being treated for a kidney disease.
