= Terceiro Comando =

Brazilian criminal organization

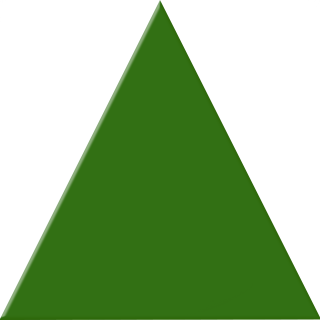
- Symbol sometimes used by Terceiro Comando
- Founded: Early 1980s
- Founders: Pianinho and Adilson Balbino
- Founding location: Rio de Janeiro, Brazil
- Years active: early 1980s-2006
- Membership: drug trafficking, arms trade, and bank robbery
- Rivals: Comando Vermelho

Terceiro Comando (Portuguese for Third Command), known by the acronym TC, was a Brazilian criminal organization engaged in drug trafficking in Rio de Janeiro. Founded in the early 1980s, it originated as a break-away faction of Comando Vermelho.

The Terceiro Comando has fought several small-scale conflicts (in 2001 and 2004) with the rival gang Comando Vermelho.

The organization has no sole leader and is instead a horizontal reciprocity based network that helps member-gangs in different favelas as they attempt to acquire drugs and guns.
