= Elias Maluco =

Brazilian drug trafficker (1966–2020)

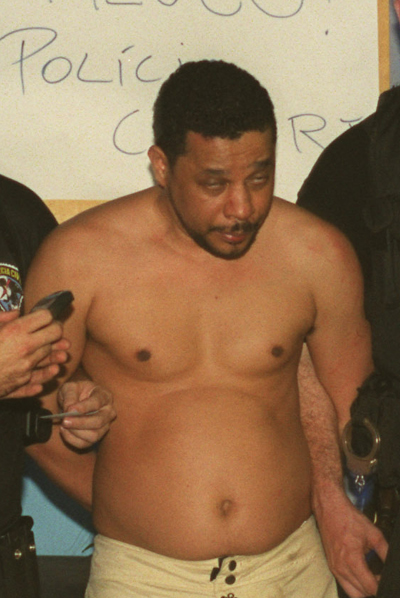
- Elias Maluco being introduced by the police after his arrest in 2002
- Born: Elias Pereira da Silva; 23 May 1966; Rio de Janeiro, Brazil
- Died: 22 September 2020 (aged 54); Catanduvas Federal Penitentiary, Catanduvas, Paraná, Brazil
- Cause of death: Suicide by hanging
- Occupation: Drug trafficker
- Known for: Murder of Tim Lopes

Elias Pereira da Silva (23 May 1966 – 22 September 2020), also known as Elias Maluco (in English: Crazy Elias), was one of Rio de Janeiro's most powerful drug traffickers. Maluco, a member of the criminal faction Comando Vermelho, commanded drug trafficking in thirty slums near Complexo do Alemão and Penha, Brazil. He was accused of killing over sixty people.

Elias Maluco was held responsible for the waves of violence that shook Rio de Janeiro between December 2006 and November 2010. He was arrested on 19 September 2002, after a three-month manhunt.

== Murder of Tim Lopes ==
On 2 June 2002, journalist Tim Lopes was kidnapped by a group of drug dealers led by Elias and was taken to the Favela da Grota slum in Complexo do Alemão. Lopes was tortured and killed after being found with a camera which he was using for his reporting on sexual abuse of minors and drug trafficking in clubs in the Vila Cruzeiro favela. According to testimonies from drug traffickers linked to Maluco, who was arrested a few days later by the police, Maluco had tortured Lopes by burning his eyes with a cigarette and hitting him with a katana, and later burned his body with tires and gasoline in a method of killing known among locals as a "microwave." After intense searches, the charred remains of Lopes' body were found on 12 June 2002, in a clandestine cemetery in the Favela da Grota.

The crime had international repercussions and motivated demonstrations against violence and defense of press freedom in Rio de Janeiro. Brazil was named as the third most dangerous country for professionals in this field in the Americas by the Inter-American Press Association Impunity Commission (IAPA).

== Capture ==
On 16 September 2002, after a three-month manhunt led by the Rio de Janeiro security summit, the police launched "Operation Sufoco" and surrounded Complexo do Alemão with the aim to capture Maluco. After 50 hours of searching, Maluco was captured in Favela da Grota without resisting arrest. His words, at the time of his arrest, were "I lost, man. Just don't humiliate me", referring to the police's eagerness to arrest him.

In December 2002, Elias Maluco was sentenced to 13 years in prison for trafficking crimes and association to drug trafficking, in a process involving the singer Belo. On 10 November 2003, he was sentenced to 18 years in prison by the 23rd Criminal Court of Rio de Janeiro for the same crimes in the context of another process. On 25 May 2005, he was sentenced to 28.5 years in prison by the 1st Rio de Janeiro Jury Tribunal for the crimes of triple-qualified homicide, conspiracy, and concealment of a body in the case of the murder of Tim Lopes.

Maluco was imprisoned in a Brazilian prison complex following his arrest until 4 January 2007, when he was transferred to the Federal Prison in Catanduvas, Paraná. He was transferred with eleven other heads of the criminal factions Comando Vermelho and Terceiro Comando, who were accused of arson and attacking police stations and military police posts on 28 December 2006, in Rio de Janeiro. These attacks resulted in the death of nineteen people.

After the start of a new wave of violence in Rio de Janeiro on 21 November 2010, Maluco and one other, who according to police intelligence, had ordered the attacks, were transferred on 25 November 2010, to the Federal Penitentiary in Porto Velho, Rondônia. Finally, on 18 August 2011, Maluco was transferred again, this time to the Federal Prison in Campo Grande, Mato Grosso do Sul.

== Death ==
In the late afternoon hours of 22 September 2020, the Paraná Penitentiary Department (DEPEN) informed the press that Elias Maluco was found dead in his cell at the Catanduvas Federal Penitentiary. According to the agency, Maluco's body showed signs of hanging. His death certificate confirmed the cause of death as mechanical choking by hanging.

Police chief Daniel Martarelli da Costa, from the Federal Police of Brazil, responsible for the investigation, classified the case as a "classic suicide". In his cell, agents found letters left for his family.

In the letters, he did not report the reason for the act. He basically said that he no longer had the will to live and asked his family for forgiveness, saying that it was not an act of cowardice, but rather of courage, that he felt ready for that. He didn’t report anything about threat or motivation.

— Daniel Martarelli da Costa about Elias Maluco’s letters

Elias' death is surrounded by controversy: many believe that he killed himself, for having lost his leadership within the Comando Vermelho (a month before he died, he had a fallout with the leader of the criminal faction, Márcio dos Santos Nepomuceno (known as "Marcinho VP"), leading to him being demoted from the organization's hierarchy).

Others, such as Elias' daughter Julia Fernandes, however, believe that he was killed in prison and that the alleged assassins made it look like he killed himself in his cell. A possible reason for his possible murder was the fact that he had argued and angered the gang leaders (like the aforementioned Marcinho VP, quoted above) a month before he was killed, which made the top echelon of the Comando Vermelho realize that Elias Maluco became a big problem for the gang, ordering his execution and thus disguising it as a suicide, thus eliminating someone they considered a dead weight for the criminal organization.
