= Fernandinho Beira-Mar =

Brazilian gangster (born 1967)

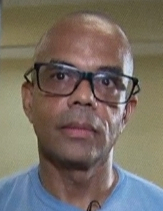
- Born: Luiz Fernando da Costa; July 4, 1967 (age 59); Duque de Caxias, Rio de Janeiro, Brazil
- Occupations: Criminal organization leader, theologian
- Criminal charges: Robbery, homicide, arms and drug trafficking
- Criminal penalty: 309 years and 2 months in prison
- Criminal status: Incarcerated

Luiz Fernando da Costa (born 4 July 1967), better known as Fernandinho Beira-Mar ("Seaside Freddy"), is a Brazilian criminal and theologian, known for being one of the leaders of Comando Vermelho. In the mid-1990s until his prison in 2001, Beira-Mar rose to become one of the biggest drug and arms traffickers in Latin America, and he has since been held responsible for hundreds or thousands of acts of torture and murder related to the drug war in Rio de Janeiro.

While in prison, he studied theology through distance learning at the Baptist Theological Faculty of Paraná, graduating with the monograph Jesus Christ: Example of Life and Source of Wisdom, in which he criticizes globalization, capitalism, and consumerism.

== Biography ==
Luiz Fernando da Costa was born in the Beira-Mar favela, in Duque de Caxias, Rio de Janeiro, on July 4, 1967. He was raised by his mother, housewife and cleaner Zelina Laurentina da Costa, and never knew his father. He was an altar boy at the Church of São Pedro for three years, and was considered a diligent student at school. At the age of 18, he was serving in the Brazilian Army when he learned that his mother had been run over and killed while trying to cross the Washington Luiz highway, which cuts through the favela.

Fernandinho entered the world of crime while still in the Army, being caught in the act of robbing a business in Duque de Caxias on November 12, 1986. Following that, he was arrested by the Civil Police and expelled from the Army, where he had already faced disciplinary punishment for committing various internal infractions. After two years in prison, he continued his criminal career by robbing jewelry stores and supplying cocaine to several favelas in Rio de Janeiro. By 1996, he had assets worth R$10 million in real estate, bank accounts, and cars.

In 1996, he was captured in Belo Horizonte, Minas Gerais, with four kilograms of pure cocaine, where he began serving a 12-year prison sentence. In August 1997, he managed to escape from prison after paying R$1 million to the guards to let him out. Immediately, he fled to the city of Capitán Bado, in Paraguay, near the border with the Brazilian state of Mato Grosso do Sul, where he became the main supplier of marijuana to Brazil.

Surrounded by Paraguayan authorities, Beira-Mar fled to Colombia, where he continued to control marijuana and cocaine shipments that passed through Paraguay. In addition to drugs, he reportedly sent at least two thousand military-grade weapons to Rio de Janeiro. He was arrested by the National Army of Colombia on April 21, 2001, while establishing partnerships with the FARC, led by Tomás Medina Caracas.

While in prison, Beira-Mar was accused of and convicted for leading a riot at the Bangu Penitentiary Complex on September 11, 2002, which ended with the execution of enemies of Comando Vermelho. Among the dead was Ernaldo de Medeiros, known as Uê, founder of the criminal organization Amigos dos Amigos. Beira-Mar has always denied having commanded the massacre.
