= Família do Norte =

Brazilian crime family

- Founded: 2007
- Founders: José Roberto Fernandes Barbosa; Gelson Carnaúba; Fernandes Barbosa
- Founding location: Manaus, Amazonas
- Years active: 2007-present
- Territory: Main territory: Amazonas, Amapá, Acre, Pará, Rondônia and Roraima. Significant activity: Venezuela, Colombia and Peru.
- Ethnicity: Brazilians (predominantly), Colombians, Peruvians and Venezuelans
- Leader: Zé Roberto da Compensa
- Activities: Murder, drug trafficking, arms trafficking, robbery and other activities
- Allies: Comando Vermelho (before July 2020)
- Rivals: Comando Vermelho (after July 2020), Guardiões do Estado, Primeiro Comando da Capital

The Familia do Norte (FDN; lit. 'Northern Family') (Note: Also referred to in Portuguese as Cartel do Norte (lit. 'Cartel of the North') or CDN.) is a criminal faction that occupies northern Brazil and some regions in other countries such as: Colombia, Peru and Venezuela. It is considered the 3rd largest faction in Brazil, and the largest in the state of Amazonas, in addition to not having good relations with other Brazilian factions, having already entered into several faction wars. The Familia do Norte also has its football team: Compensão, in which it has allegedly invested at least 320 thousand reais (55 thousand dollars).

== History ==
The group was created in 2007 by Fernandes Barbosa, Zé Roberto da Compensa and Gelson Carnaúba (known as Mano G.), it emerged in prisons and outskirts of Manaus, as a way of fighting to prevent the precarious and dangerous conditions that affected prisoners in Manaus. Between 2015 and 2018, the Familia do Norte and the Comando Vermelho (CV) formed an alliance to prevent the advance of the Primeiro Comando da Capital (PCC) in Amazonas, generating the War between the PCC and CV in 2016. In 2018, the alliance dissolved, generating a confrontation between the CV and Familia do Norte, weakening the faction.

The faction has, in recent years, largely declined in the state, with many of its members joining CV. The conflict between both factions reached its height in 2019, when Roberto da Compensa, João Branco and Gelson Carnaúba, the three founders of the organization, entered into a dispute over control of the faction, leading to internal conflicts and turf wars which resulted in several deaths in Manaus. On February 2020, CV took control of various neighborhoods in Manaus as the faction faced a series of internal disputes and assassinations, with many members being killed or switching sides to join CV and PCC. The Compensa neighborhood (where Zé Roberto is originally from) registered at least 52 deaths during this period, with the city of Manaus itself having registered over 400.

Many members, such as Mano G himself, ended up joining the CV during the disputes, further weakening the faction. Roberto da Compensa's son, known as "L7", later became the leader of the organization, which was renamed to "Cartel do Norte" (Cartel of the North; CDN). While it retained much of the faction's members, many still left to join either PCC or CV, especially after L7 was killed in 2022 by members of a rival organization. Many members were also killed in prison riots and turf wars with PCC and CV, with some leaving to join a CV splinter group known as "Revolucionarios do Amazonas" (Revolutionaries of Amazonas; RDA), which later joined PCC in the state.

== See also ==
- Crime in Brazil
- List of criminal gangs in Brazil
