= Comando Vermelho =

Brazilian criminal organization

- The red flag is commonly used to represent the criminal faction.
- Founded: 1979
- Founders: · William da Silva Lima, o Professor · José Carlos dos Reis Encina, Escadinha · Rogério Lemgruber
- Founding location: Cândido Mendes Penal Institute, Ilha Grande, Rio de Janeiro, Brazil
- Years active: 1979–present
- Territory: Main territory: Rio de Janeiro; Main routes: North and Northeast regions; Espírito Santo, Santa Catarina, Minas Gerais, Mato Grosso and Goiás; Significant activity: Border regions in Bolivia, Paraguay, Peru, Colombia, Venezuela and the Guyanas
- Ethnicity: Brazilians (predominantly)
- Membership: Up to 30,000 (2020)
- Leaders: Edgard Alves de Andrade; Fernandinho Beira-Mar (surrendered); Márcio dos Santos Nepomuceno (surrendered)
- Criminal activities: Drug trafficking, arms trafficking, tobacco smuggling, alcohol smuggling, wildlife smuggling, counterfeiting, currency forgery, illegal logging, illegal mining, television piracy, fuel theft, carjacking, chop shops, bank robbery, extortion, racketeering, fraud, loan sharking, money laundering, illegal gambling, pimping, kidnapping, contract killing and narcoterrorism
- Allies: Primeiro Grupo Catarinense; Bala na Cara; Primeiro Comando de Vitória; Comando Revolucionário Brasileiro; Comando da Paz; Clan Rotela
- Rivals: Primeiro Comando da Capital; Terceiro Comando Puro; Amigos dos Amigos; Police militias Família do Norte; Guardiões do Estado; Bonde do Maluco; Bonde dos 40; Sindicato do Crime; Massa Carcerária; A Família Capixaba; Primeiro Comando do Maranhão; Okaida
- Political position: Far-left (historically)

Comando Vermelho (Note: Brazilian Portuguese pronunciation: [koˈmɐ̃du veʁˈmeʎu]) (CV; lit. 'Red Command' or 'Red Commando') (Note: Also referred to in Portuguese as Comando Vermelho - Rogério Lemgruber (CV-RL, lit. 'Red Command - Rogério Lemgruber') or O Comando (lit. 'The Command').) is a Brazilian criminal organization engaged primarily in drugs and arms trafficking. The group, originally known as Falange Vermelha ("Red Phalanx"), was formed in 1979 as an alliance between ordinary convicts and political prisoners (mainly members of left-wing urban guerrillas) who were imprisoned together during the 1964–1985 military dictatorship.

Influenced by radical left-wing ideologies, especially Marxism-Leninism and Maoism, they created codes of conduct and a structured hierarchy, and began employing urban guerrilla tactics against the state, while also practicing bank robberies, truckjackings and kidnappings as their main source of revenue; with their leaders controlling the organisation from inside the prisons. In the early 1980s, the group changed its name to Comando Vermelho and veered towards drug trafficking and territory control.

The Comando controls parts of Rio de Janeiro and has expanded to other states and into neighbouring countries. It has fought in several small-scale conflicts with both the government and rival groups such as Primeiro Comando da Capital (PCC), Amigos dos Amigos (ADA) and Terceiro Comando (TC), the latter itself the result of a power struggle between Comando Vermelho leaders in the mid-1980s.

== Overview ==
Ruins of the Cândido Mendes prison in Rio de Janeiro after its demolition in 1994

The group originally formed in the mid-late 1970s out of a prison alliance between common criminals and leftist guerrillas imprisoned together at Cândido Mendes Penal Institute, a maximum-security prison on the island of Ilha Grande. The prisoners formed the alliance to protect themselves from prison violence and guard-inflicted brutality. As the group coalesced, the common criminals were infused with leftist social justice ideals by the guerrillas. In 1979, prison officials labeled the alliance "Comando Vermelho", which the prisoners co-opted as their own.

In the 1980s, the group expanded beyond Ilha Grande and into other prisons and the favelas of Rio de Janeiro, also becoming heavily involved in the cocaine trade. Brazil's shift towards democracy, including the Amnesty Law for political prisoners in 1979 and the end of the military dictatorship in 1985 led many of its politically-aligned members to return to civilian life, which resulted in the organization transitioning into a mafia or cartel-like structure, as, while it still retained many of the elements of a guerrilla group (such as its use of irregular warfare tactics against state forces), many of its initial left-wing political ideals slowly became diluted within the organization's newfound focus on territorial and economic control, especially through the drug trade.

Cocaine brought the CV massive profits and growth; by 1986 the organization controlled ~70% of the cocaine trade in Rio's favelas and had established trading relationships with criminal groups in other states and neighboring countries. The group's decentralized leadership structure and disputes over profits prompted infighting, causing splinter groups such as the Terceiro Comando and Amigos dos Amigos to emerge. Conflicts with these splinters, as well as fierce resistance to state crackdowns on their operations, drove an uptick in violence throughout Brazil in the late 1980s, and into the 2000s.

Violence escalated until 2008, when the state government implemented a policy of "Pacification", which used permanent proximity-policing units (Unidade de Policia Pacificadora, known as UPPs) to maintain state control and "provide social order" in the favelas. A sharp decline in violence between the state and CV followed implementation. In 2013, Pacification efforts eroded, and conflicts between the group and state forces returned. In 2016, a 20-year truce between the Primeiro Comando da Capital (PCC), a rival organization based in São Paulo, and the CV broke down, sparking violent clashes.

While not as powerful as its peak, CV remains significant throughout Brazil; its estimated to be the second-largest criminal organization in the country, only behind PCC. The CV may boast as many as 30,000 members. The organization also continues to traffic drugs and arms, as well as fight turf wars with rival gangs. In recent years, a struggle has intensified between the CV, PCC, and other smaller groups over control of trade routes and territory in the Amazon region.

== History ==
The Comando Vermelho is the oldest criminal faction in Brazil. The gang was formed in the 1970s under the name Falange Vermelha (Red Phalanx) from a prison alliance between common criminals and left-wing guerrillas imprisoned together in the Instituto Penal Cândido Mendes, a maximum security prison on the island of Ilha Grande, the latter framed within the National Security Law of the dictatorship. The prisoners formed the alliance to protect themselves from prison violence and guard brutality. As the group solidified, guerrilla groups instilled leftist ideals of social justice in the common criminals.

The Falange Vermelha, as it was known at the time, was influenced by urban guerrilla tactics. The Falange was founded by eight inmates from the "Fundão" (the back of the class)—the cellblock housing prisoners held under the National Security Law (LSN)—among them William da Silva Lima, known as "the Teacher" (Portuguese: O Professor). The teacher stated that the organization emerged in response to "oppression" and described the situation in the prisons as follows:

Back then, there were no rules of conduct in the prisons. One inmate would disrespect another. Imagine a family man being assaulted and raped. Or an inmate whose belongings were stolen—items his mother had brought when she visited him, only for someone else to take them after she left. The Falange Vermelha came to establish rules for coexistence and a code of conduct, and to demand respect for prisoners; that was necessary.

The guerrilla techniques adopted included conceptual elements of Marxist philosophy and asymmetric warfare tactics employed by armed leftist organizations. Texts such as The Communist Manifesto and Das Kapital were studied in a way that transformed criminals into students of revolutionary rhetoric. Criminal actions came to be justified as a "response to unbearable conditions"—a narrative that masked violence with political language. The manuals by guerrilla fighters Carlos Marighella and Che Guevara—works banned in Brazil during the military regime—became guides for criminal operations, as bandits studied guerrilla tactics.

=== Military techniques ===
The Falange Vermelha adopted a rigid hierarchy and discipline, and the bandits learned that the solidarity of the militants was more effective than violent individualism. The faction adopted the cellular structure of armed resistance organizations: semi-independent cells, coded communication, and compartmentalization. This hierarchical structure ensured that the faction could continue operating even with its leaders imprisoned. A code of conduct was adopted under the motto "Peace, justice, and freedom" (Portuguese: Paz, justiça e liberdade) to prevent fratricidal struggles. Peace stated that one did not bring conflicts from the streets into the prison; Justice was a matter of an eye for an eye and a tooth for a tooth, and Freedom had as its primary objective the escape. The robbery became a political act, involving meticulously planned actions that emerged from the armed left. In this way, the Comando Vermelho transformed robberies into military operations:

- Detailed reconnaissance of objectives,
- Timed measurements, even for traffic lights,
- Evacuation routes for multiple vehicles.

The criminals went so far as to live near bank branches to gather confidential information. This level of planning transformed ordinary robberies into operations with an efficiency comparable to acts of war. The faction became capable of robbing a bank in four or five minutes—a level of efficiency inherited from those who sought to overthrow governments. There were also simultaneous attacks on several banks to confuse the police, the targeting of police stations with false alarms, and even "makeshift medical stations" to treat wounded criminals. Kidnappings were carried out to demand the release of criminal leaders, employing the concept of "devices" (Portuguese: aparelhos). Originally created for revolutionary kidnappings, they were houses purchased in strategic locations to hide fugitives and store weapons and drugs. Other techniques employed by the guerrillas were communicated to the press during the rebellions, as was the use of political slogans. Control of the population was achieved through intimidation and territorial control under the concept of "social transformation."

The faction also established "tribunals" to adjudicate internal infractions (featuring prosecution, defense, and witnesses), emulating revolutionary "people's courts." One of the first measures was the creation of the organization's "common fund" (Portuguese: caixa comum). Known as the "tithe" (Portuguese: dízimo), it consisted of 10% of the proceeds from every robbery going into a collective fund that financed escapes, paid for lawyers, and supported "war pensions" for widows. The money raised in this way would also serve to alleviate the prisoners' harsh living conditions, reinforcing the faction's authority and the respect it commanded among the prison population. A clandestine mail system known as "radiolas" was established, through which messages were passed between prisons and favelas via lawyers and family members. A secret code—the "Congo alphabet"—allowed leaders to control drug trafficking from inside their prison cells.

=== Origins (1971–1979) ===
The exact year that the Comando Vermelho was founded remains disputed, but sources agree the gang formed out of a prison alliance between leftist guerrillas and common criminals housed together during the 1970s by Brazil's military dictatorship at Cândido Mendes, a maximum security Brazilian prison.

Soon after their regime began in 1964, Brazil's military dictatorship faced a persistent challenge from leftist guerrilla rebels, made up largely of "middle-class intellectuals". In hopes of delegitimizing the rebels, in the early 1970s the Brazilian government began placing those they captured in prison alongside common criminals. One such prison, Candido Mendes, located on Ilha Grande, housed a mix of violent criminals and guerrillas in its notoriously brutal "Block B", or "The Pit". Inmates there were subject to frequent abuse at the hands of both their peers and the guards. The inmates banded together for mutual protection, shielding themselves from guard beatings and establishing a code of conduct for prisoners. Additionally, the guerrillas began to spread ideas about resistance, revolution, and social justice among the common criminals. As the alliance cemented, members introduced a common code of prison rules, designed to promote loyalty among members, reduce violence within the prison, and advance the common cause of the prisoners, while still maintaining a degree of autonomy for individual members to act as they desired.

In attempts to break up the alliance, prison officials moved inmate leaders to different wings and prisons, but this instead helped the group spread throughout the prison system. During this period prison officials gave the group its name: one official called the group "Comando Vermelho" in a memo to his colleagues. The name was adopted first by the press and then later by the group itself.

=== Split with the guerrillas and the cocaine boom (1979–late 1980s) ===
In 1979, sensing an impending democratization movement, newly installed President João Figueiredo and his military regime began to fear that they and members of their armed forces could face trial for human rights violations in a democratic system. To protect themselves, Figueiredo "manipulated a grassroots movement demanding amnesty for thousands of political prisoners and exiles to insulate himself and his colleagues from potential indictments," and passed the sweeping 1979 Amnesty Law, protecting political prisoners and their government captors from prosecution. As a result, the leftist guerrilla elements of the CV were released from prison, weakening the group's ideological bent.

Meanwhile, the CV began to spread beyond prison gates. While many of its original members were bank robbers, the group quickly became involved in the burgeoning cocaine market. CV members helped traffic drugs overseas for Colombian cartels and distributed cocaine into the local Rio de Janeiro market. The cocaine trade proved incredibly lucrative and the CV grew rapidly: "by the end of 1985, the gang already controlled 70% of the drug market in the favelas of Rio de Janeiro."

During this period, the CV became increasingly involved in the provision of social services and administration of justice for the favela communities which it controlled. In exchange for the cooperation of favela residents, the CV prohibited theft, robbery, and rape, and provided public goods like school supplies, medical equipment, and food distribution for the poor.

The official end of the military dictatorship in 1985 marked the end of all remaining ties between the leftist guerrillas and the CV. Many of the guerrillas re-entered society and "rose inside political parties;" some would go on to hold elected office.

=== Infighting and growing cartel-state violence (late 1980s–2008) ===
Massive profits created incentives for different CV factions to splinter off as local leaders sought larger profit shares. Notable break-away groups which emerged during this period include Terceiro Comando and Amigos dos Amigos. As these groups clashed over territory in Rio, violence rapidly increased throughout the city.

After Pablo Escobar's death, the CV established a working relationship with the FARC, a Colombian guerrilla group which moved into the cocaine trade. Led by Luiz Fernando da Costa (a.k.a. Fernandinho Beira-Mar, lit. 'Seaside Freddy') the CV procured arms and ammunition, which they delivered to the FARC in exchange for their supply of cocaine.

=== Pacification (2008–2013) ===
Beginning in 2008, in an effort to combat the widespread gang-related violence, Rio state police forces implemented a new "Pacification" strategy, "inspired by notions of community-oriented policing." The strategy, which proceeded in stages, began with state occupation of a target favela using overwhelming military force, followed by the installation of a proximity-policing unit (Unidade de Policia Pacificadora, UPP), which remains in the favela after military withdrawal. Rather than eliminating the drug trade, the UPPs were primarily tasked with securing the favela communities from gang-related violence.

The early period of Pacification (2008–2010) saw 40 UPP battalions installed across 200 communities, and was largely successful for the state. The CV, which suddenly ceased their violent confrontation with state forces, ceded significant territory to the state; one UPP effort left "the CV's principal stronghold firmly in the hand of the state for the first time in more than a generation."

=== Resurgence in violence (2013–present) ===
Despite its initial success for the state, corruption and over-expansion caused erosion of the "Pacification" system, and by 2013 the program began to break down. Since then, violent clashes between the CV and state forces have surged. In 2016, following the collapse of a 20-year truce between the CV and the PCC, violence surged even further, as both organizations sought to ally themselves with smaller groups to fight over drug and arms trafficking routes and territory. In 2023, sources consistently reported frequent violent clashes between the CV and the PCC, as well as other rival groups and militias, such as the Terceiro Comando Puro and ADA.

Additionally, an emerging struggle for control of the Amazon region has intensified between rival organizations, including the CV. Seeking access to the valuable trafficking routes along the Colombia-Brazil-Peru tri-border region, groups such as CV, PCC, Família do Norte, Tren de Aragua and Colombian militias have violently fought, contributing to a significant uptick in regional fatalities.

Armed militia groups in Rio represent another growing challenge for the CV. These militias, which are formed mainly of former and current police officers and military, have grown to control substantial territory throughout Rio. In recent years, violence between militias and drug gangs has intensified; in 2020 and 2021, "clashes between gangs and militias were responsible for 28% of reported fatalities" in Rio. For example, in July and August 2022, the CV clashed frequently with the "Campinho" police militia for control of the Morro do Fuba community in the North Zone of Rio de Janeiro.

== Structure ==
The Comando Vermelho's structure is loosely hierarchical yet allows significant autonomy throughout the organization. While there is no one single boss, imprisoned senior leaders exercise authority over favela leaders, known as donos ('owners'), who deliver rents to the prison leaders as a form of "insurance scheme." Essentially, non-imprisoned members provide financial support and carry out instructions from imprisoned leaders, thus protecting themselves from retribution in the event that they are captured themselves.

Beneath the favela donos, there are the gerentes de boca ('drug-selling point managers') and gerentes de area ('area managers'), who organize the drug selling points; seguranças ('security') and soldados ('soldiers'), who protect the favela's turf and leaders, while also taking part in conflicts against police and rival groups; vapors, who carry out drug trafficking; as well as the olheiros ('lookouts'), fogueteiros ('rocketeers') and radinhos ('radios'), which warn the other members of incursions by police or rival factions (sometimes using walkie-talkies or fireworks). The olheiros, fogueteiros and radinhos are the lowest-level gang members, often young adults, teens or even children. Those tasked with organizing the soldados and seguranças may also be called generais ('generals') or chefes de guerra ('war chiefs'), holding significant authority within the favela.

Within this structure, there is significant freedom for gang members to run operations as they see fit. According to Penglase, the "CV is most accurately described as a loose association of drug traffickers who come together for reciprocal assistance yet who act with great degrees of autonomy." Members of the CV operate with a shared identity and a common set of norms, but negotiate separately with individual drug suppliers, known as matutos. High levels of autonomy have been characteristic of the CV since its inception on Ilha Grande: while prisoners were barred from violence against each other, they were freely allowed to pursue independent business. Another distinct aspect of CV structure is that they allow their leaders to freely step away from gang activity if they choose to do so, in stark contrast with many comparable gangs who require members to remain active until death.

Inside prisons with a strong CV presence, senior leaders practice internal criminal governance. These leaders "rule prison life, settle internal faction disputes that occur outside of prison and make the final decision on any matters of mutual interest for faction affiliates."

In 2025, Rio de Janeiro state representative TH Joias was preventively arrested for having ties to the Comando Vermelho, acting as an arm of the criminal group in the Legislative Assembly of Rio de Janeiro (Alerj).

== Conflict with government ==
A defining characteristic of the CV is their willingness to openly engage the state in armed confrontation. Since the mid-1980s, as state forces steadily increased the severity of their crackdowns, the CV has responded with frequent violent clashes. Lessing writes that "nowhere else in Brazil, or in much of the world for that matter," have Rio cartels, and primarily the CV, "systematically engaged the state in armed confrontation for so long." Currently, the CV continues to violently fight with state forces, and the ACLED reports that state violence represents a disproportionate share of reported fatalities in Rio de Janeiro.

One suggested explanation for the CV's violent conflict with the state is the varying levels of conditionality in state crackdowns––whether the state cracks down harder on violent cartel behavior. In 2008, after the highly-conditional Pacification policy was implemented, cartel-state violence declined, only to see a resurgence after the policy eroded.

=== Examples of CV–state conflict ===
On 19 November 2016, a Rio de Janeiro police helicopter was shot down by small arms fire during a clash with CV gang members and crashed in a ditch. All four police officers on board were killed. In June 2018, the CV launched attacks on a Bolivian Army base in Porvenir and a Brazilian police station in Epitaciolandia, in both instances stealing weapons and ammunition.

==== Operation Containment ====
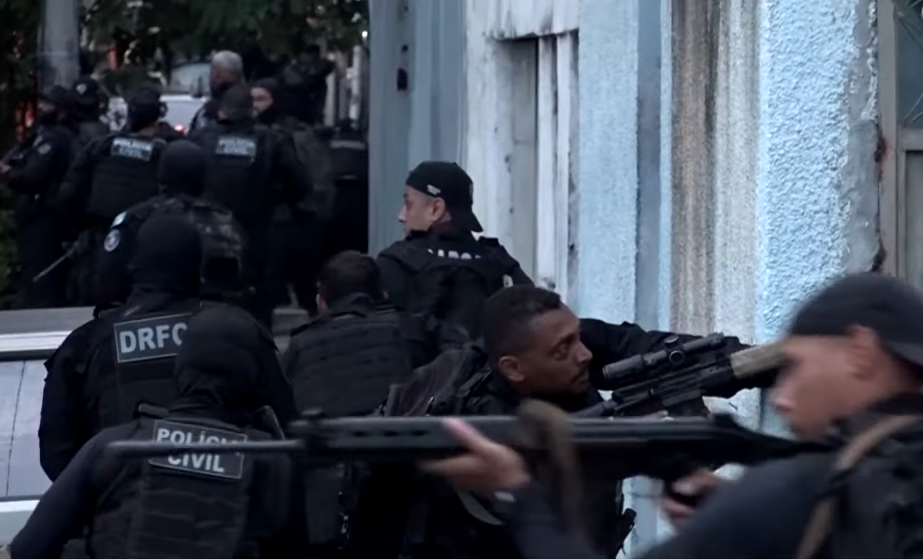
Police officers during the operation

Operation Containment (Portuguese: Operação Contenção) was a large-scale law-enforcement operation launched on 28 October 2025 by the state government against the CV. Approximately 2,500 police agents participated and executed hundreds of police warrants to arrest gang leaders in 26 communities in the North Zone of Rio, mainly in the Penha and Alemão neighborhoods.

Launched just before dawn, intense confrontations occurred all day. Gangs set barricades ablaze and used drone-dropped bombs on special forces teams. The operation seized 93 rifles, killed 121 people, and resulted in 133 arrests, according to police. State governor Cláudio Castro stated the casualties were criminals and called the operation "a success"; some local residents as well as national and international civil society groups criticized the lethality of police conduct and questioned official claims that all the dead were criminals.

The operation was the deadliest police action in the state's history in a favela, surpassing the 2021 Jacarezinho shootout that killed 28 people, and was also, overall, the deadliest in Brazilian history, exceeding the Carandiru massacre, where 111 inmates were killed in a prison riot in 1992.

== Comando Vermelho and funk carioca ==
The Comando Vermelho continue to attract new Brazilian youth and bring them into their ranks. In addition to sponsoring groups like neighborhood associations and special interest clubs, and organizing sporting events, one of the most common ways in which the criminal organization is able to catch the youth's attention is through the popular musical style of funk carioca, a form of Brazilian music derived from Miami bass. Due to the genre's popularity with young Brazilians, the group "is known to have subsidized funk parties to recruit young kids for drug dealing".

In addition to these funk parties (bailes funk), "where drugs and sex attract even bourgeois or petty-bourgeois youth", held regularly by the organization every Sunday, funk artists are also sponsored by the CV to record songs and even entire CDs that promote the group and eulogize the group's dead members. Because the CV pays for the production and recording of the funk songs, they "are often well recorded and of a high technical quality, and are being played on pirate radio stations and sold by hundreds of street vendors in Rio de Janeiro and in São Paulo." Thus the funk artists that are in league with the CV sometimes garner significant sales and airplay despite making a type of music that is Proibidão, or 'extremely prohibited', in terms of where it can be sold and who can play it. In addition to promoting the crime group, the funk sponsored by the CV also challenges the ideas and laws of the Division of the Repression Against Drugs.

== Notable members ==
- William da Silva Lima, a.k.a. "O Professor ('The Professor'; deceased): One of the founders of the movement, he arrived at Cândido Mendes prison in 1971. The Professor took part in several bank robberies and was a major figure during the Commando's initial rise to power. He later wrote the memoir Four Hundred Against One, which describes his experience during the early years of the organisation. Despite being called "The Professor" or "The Teacher" (Portuguese: O Professor), William left school at 12 years old. Being first arrested at 17 years old, he would educated himself behind bars and acted as a representative for the prisoners, drafting petitions and letters to the authorities. Being "the brain" of the Commando, The Professor saw himself as a "social bandit". He was one of the creators of the faction's code of conduct and served his sentence in a closed prison for over thirty years, among escapes and recaptures. He was married for over 30 years to the lawyer Simone Barros Correa de Menezes, twenty years younger, with whom he had four children, and whom he met while he was still being held on Ilha Grande as she provided legal services to the inmates. He died in 2019 of a heart attack in his home in the South Zone of Rio at the age of 76, while serving his sentence in an open regime and under electronic monitoring with an electronic ankle bracelet. He was sentenced to a total of 95 years and six months in prison for crimes such as bank robbery, extortion and kidnapping.
- Luiz Fernando da Costa, a.k.a. "Fernandinho Beira-Mar" ('Seaside Freddy'; incarcerated): Beira-Mar is an imprisoned senior leader who led the CV's business dealings with the FARC, the Colombian guerrilla group that entered the cocaine trade following the death of Pablo Escobar. In 2001, he was captured by the Colombian military following a shootout, and was extradited to Brazil.
- Rogério Lemgruber, a.k.a. "Bagulhão", "Marechal" (Marshal) or "RL" (deceased): Although now unknown to the general public, he was one of the most idolized leaders of the faction, his name being engraved in acronyms, letters and on the walls of hundreds of favelas. He grew up in the favela of Rebu, in Senador Camará, in the western zone, and committed bank robberies with his brother, Sebastião Lemgruber, nicknamed Tiguel. In 1972, he was incarcerated in the Ilha Grande prison, where he spent most of his life. It was there that he met the Professor and became involved in organizing the faction. In January 1980, he managed to leave the island by boat. After several prison sentences, he died of liver failure and diabetes on 29 May 1992.
- Márcio dos Santos Nepomuceno, a.k.a. "Marcinho VP" (incarcerated): Considered the most powerful drug lord in Rio de Janeiro, he is currently the top leader of the CV, having taken control of this crime syndicate following the arrest of Fernandinho Beira-Mar in 2002, after Beira-Mar brutally killed Ernaldo Pinto Medeiros (a.k.a. UÉ), who was the founder and top leader of Amigos dos Amigos, in retaliation for the murder of Orlando Jogador, one of the original leaders of the CV (which would have been ordered by UÉ).
- Elias Pereira da Silva, a.k.a. Elias Maluco ('Crazy Elias'; deceased): He was one of the most powerful drug dealers in Rio de Janeiro and one of the most dangerous members of the Comando Vermelho, until he was arrested for the murder of famous Brazilian journalist Tim Lopes in 2002. His death is unsolved: he was found dead, hanged in his cell on 22 September 2020, but it is unknown if he committed suicide or if someone inside the prison killed him and made it look like a suicide.
- Roni Peixoto, a.k.a. "Gordo" ('Fat Man'; deceased): He was known by the nickname Gordo because he was overweight during his leadership of the CV in Minas Gerais. Considered one of the biggest drug lords in the state during the 2000s, he was Beira-Mar's right-hand man, responsible for controlling drug trafficking throughout Minas Gerais and the introducer of crack in Belo Horizonte (the capital of Minas Gerais), which may have led to his brutal murder in 2022.
- Cláudio Augusto da Silva Duarte, a.k.a. "Mano C" ('Brother C'; incarcerated): CV leader in the state of Pará in northern Brazil.
- Ocimar Prado Junior, a.k.a. "Coquinho" (incarcerated): CV leader in the state of Amazonas in northern Brazil.

== Designation as a terrorist group ==
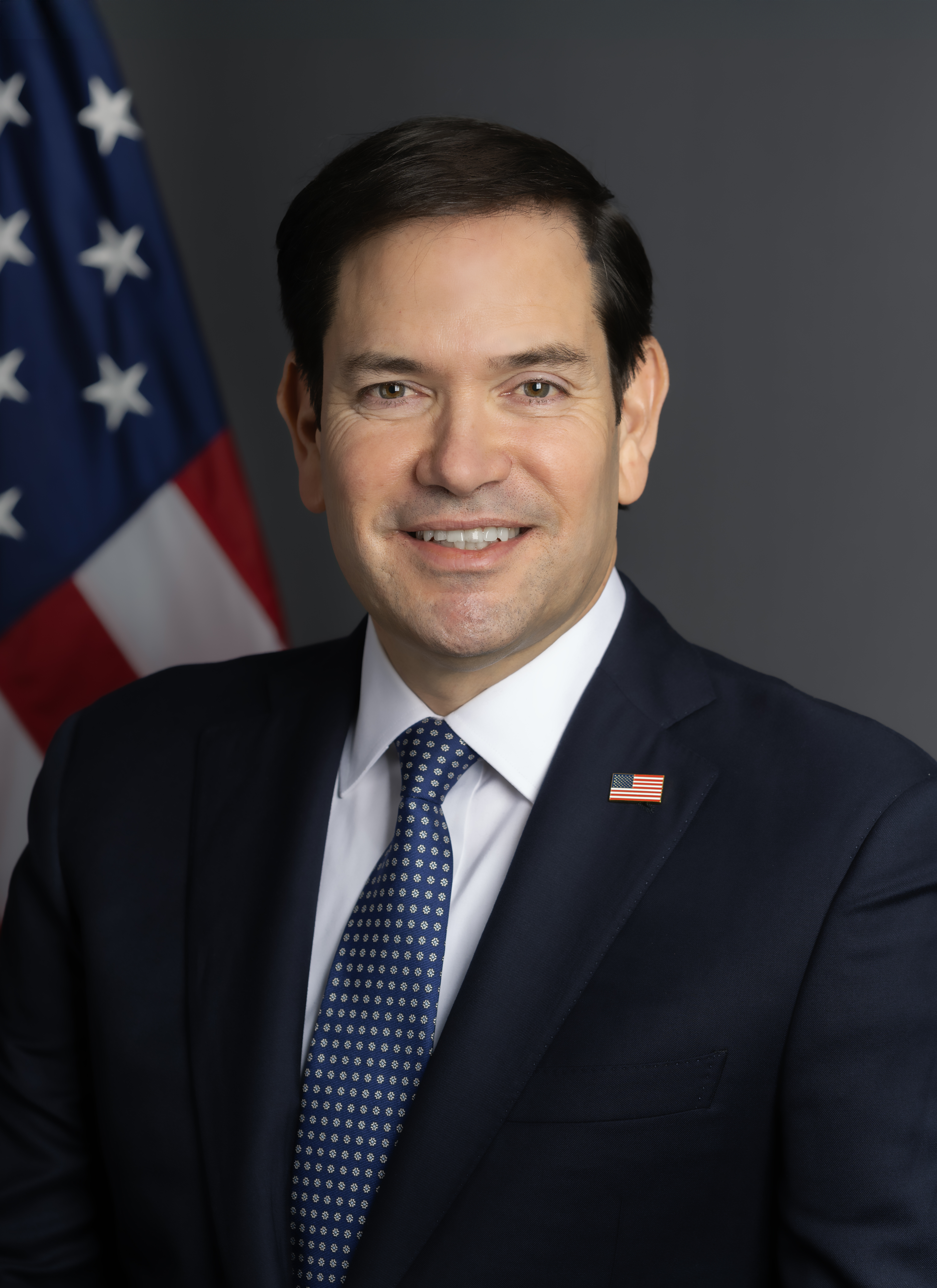
US Secretary of State Marco Rubio designated the Comando Vermelho (CV) as a terrorist organization on 28 May 2026.

In 2025, the Government of Argentina, led by Javier Milei, declared Commando Vermelho (CV) and Primeiro Comando da Capital (PCC) as narcoterrorist organizations. In October 2025, the Minister of Security, Patricia Bullrich, announced that both groups had been included in the Registry of Persons and Entities Linked to Acts of Terrorism (RePET), which gathers groups and individuals considered a threat to national security. Subsequently, Paraguay also designated them as such. Both countries have reinforced their borders with Brazil in response to the actions of the Comando Vermelho.

Due to the use of weapons of war and violent tactics that threaten public safety, the government of the State of Rio de Janeiro has sent a report to the United States government requesting that the criminal factions be classified as narco-terrorist organizations. On 28 May 2026, United States Secretary of State, Marco Rubio, designated both groups as Specially Designated Global Terrorists (SDGTs) and, as of 5 June, Foreign Terrorist Organizations (FTOs). Brazilian President Luiz Inácio Lula da Silva strongly criticized the United States' designation of the criminal organizations CV and PCC as terrorist organizations. Among their justifications is the "attack on Brazil's sovereignty".

== In popular culture ==
One of the founders of the faction, William da Silva Lima, known as the Professor, wrote the autobiographical book Four Hundred Against One: A History of the Red Commando (Quatrocentos contra um: uma história do Comando Vermelho), which has been adapted twice by director Caco Souza: first time in the documentary Senhora Liberdade, in 2004, followed by the feature film 400 against 1 - A History of Organized Crime, in 2010. The role of the Professor was played by Daniel de Oliveira, who had already played Cazuza in his biopic. The film also starred Daniela Escobar and featured a special appearance by singer Negra Li. The union between common law prisoners and political prisoners was depicted in the film Quase Dois Irmãos (2004), starring Caco Ciocler and Flávio Bauraqui.

In 2006, Ross Kemp's docuseries Ross Kemp on Gangs included an episode titled "Rio De Janeiro", which investigated the Comando Vermelho and their police adversaries. The film City of God is an adaptation of the eponymous fiction novel, which deals with the rise of organized crime in Rio de Janeiro. Although the faction in question is never mentioned in the story, the setting of the plot, Cidade de Deus, is controlled by Comando Vermelho in real life. The DVD release of the film contains an extra documentary, News from a Personal War, which features interviews with the police and local children from the favelas. In the 2009 documentary Dancing with the Devil, director Jon Blair investigates criminal organizations in Rio's favelas, including the Red Commando.

== See also ==
- Brazilian drug war
- Crime in Brazil
- List of criminal gangs in Brazil

== Bibliography ==
=== Books ===
- Amorim, Carlos (2011) [1993]. Comando Vermelho: A Historia do Crime Organizado (in Brazilian Portuguese). Rio de Janeiro: BestBolso. p. 365. ISBN 978-85-7799-327-7. OCLC 966781355.
- Amorim, Carlos (2003). CV-PCC: A Irmandade do Crime (in Brazilian Portuguese). Rio de Janeiro: Editora Record. p. 470. ISBN 978-85-01-05825-6. OCLC 912711860.
- Amorim, Carlos (2010). Assalto ao Poder: O Crime Organizado (in Brazilian Portuguese). Rio de Janeiro: Editora Record. p. 531. ISBN 978-85-01-08833-8. OCLC 669038428.
- Barcellos, Caco (2003). Abusado: O Dono do Morro Dona Marta (in Brazilian Portuguese). Rio de Janeiro: Editora Record. p. 557. ISBN 978-85-01-06520-9. OCLC 817277404.
- Barbato Júnior, Roberto (2007). Direito Informal e Criminalidade: Os Códigos do Cárcere e do Tráfico (in Brazilian Portuguese). Campinas: Millennium Editora. p. 168. ISBN 978-85-7625-099-9. OCLC 685245916.
- Lima, William da Silva (1991). Quatrocentos contra um: uma história do Comando Vermelho (in Brazilian Portuguese). Petrópolis, Rio de Janeiro: Vozes. p. 108. ISBN 978-85-326-0573-3. OCLC 683611143.
- Lima, Fábio Souza (2011). O Mito do Comando Vermelho: Em Manguinhos e no Rio de Janeiro (in Brazilian Portuguese). Rio de Janeiro: Clube de Autores. p. 141. ISBN 978-85-913002-0-4. OCLC 1485534133.
- Macdonald, Laura; Hilgers, Tina (2017). Violence in Latin America and the Caribbean: Subnational Structures, Institutions, and Clientelistic Networks. Cambridge: Cambridge University Press. p. 298. ISBN 978-1-107-19317-8.
- Souza, Daniel (2025). Guerras, Líderes e Símbolos: A história das facções criminosas e milícias do Rio de Janeiro (in Brazilian Portuguese). Rio de Janeiro: Viseu. p. 700. ISBN 978-65-280-2658-6.
- Grillo, Ioan (2016). Gangster Warlords: Drug Dollars, Killing Fields, and the New Politics of Latin America. London: Bloomsbury Publishing. p. 384. ISBN 978-1-4088-4591-2. OCLC 982214269.

=== Journals ===
- Barbosa, Antonio Rafael (2019). "Política e moral nas prisões brasileiras". Tempo Social (in Brazilian Portuguese). 31 (3): 121–140. doi:10.11606/0103-2070.ts.2019.162523. eISSN 1809-4554. ISSN 0103-2070 – via Scielo Brasil.
- Coutinho, Leonardo (19 February 2019). "The Evolution of the Most Lethal Criminal Organization in Brazil—the PCC". PRISM. 8 (1). National Defense University. Archived from the original on 3 January 2023.
- Dalby, Chris (7 May 2021). "Rage, Rinse, Repeat – The Futile Cycle of Anger at Rio's Police". InSight Crime.
- Wright, Joanna (27 October 2005). "UNODC Report: Firearms and drugs fuel conflict in Brazil's favelas". Jane's Intelligence Review. Peace Research Institute Oslo (PRIO).
- Joseph, Regina (1 September 2011). "Rio and the Reds: The Comando Vermelho, Organized Crime and Brazil's Economic Ascent" (PDF). Western Hemisphere Security Analysis Center (WHEMSAC). New York University.
