= Raquel Lima =

Portuguese poet (b. 1983)

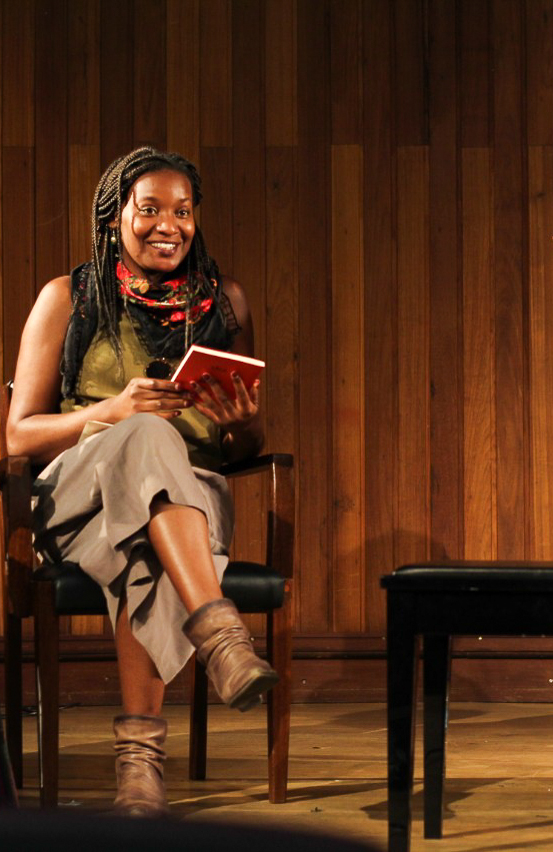
- Born: January 29, 1983 (age 43); Lisbon
- Education: Center for Social Studies at the University of Coimbra

Raquel Lima (Lisbon, January 29, 1983) is a Portuguese poet, of Angolan and Santomean descent, an art educator, and a researcher in Post-Colonial Studies.

== Biography ==
She graduated in Artistic Studies from the Faculty of Arts of the University of Lisbon in 2008 and as of 2020 is a doctoral student in the Post-Colonialisms and Global Citizenship Program at the Center for Social Studies of the Faculty of Economics of the University of Coimbra.

Since 2011, her works have been presented at events and performances in Portugal, Poland, Brazil, Italy, France, United Kingdom, Belgium, Estonia, Spain, Netherlands, Sweden, Switzerland and São Tomé and Príncipe. Her participation in Portugal SLAM 2014 brought her great media attention in that country. In 2016, she appeared for the first time on Portuguese public television as an erotic slam poetry competitor on the RTP1 program, 5 Para A Meia-Noite.

Also in 2011, she founded the Associação Cultural Pantalassa, an association for the promotion of the arts of the African and Afro-diasporic space with the official Portuguese language, made up of young people from different countries (Portugal, China, Brazil, Angola, Mozambique, Cape Verde, São Paulo, Tomé, Senegal, France ) who work in a network with the purpose of carrying out extensive research on cultural manifestations that underlie relations between different countries. Between 2012 and 2017, she was general coordinator and artistic director of Portugal SLAM – International Festival of Poetry and Performance, around poetry slam and its relationship with other arts.

Raquel was a finalist in the 2015 Rio Poetry Slam, held in Morro da Babilónia favela, Rio de Janeiro, Brazil. She also participated in the 2019 FLIP - Festa Literária Internacional de Paraty and FLUP - Festa Literária das Periferias, both in Rio de Janeiro. In 2016, she was invited by Boaventura de Sousa Santos to write poetic summaries of her master classes at the Faculty of Economics of the University of Coimbra. From 2016 to 2018, she served as the Science and Technology Manager at the Center for Comparative Studies, Faculty of Arts, University of Lisbon. During her tenure, she contributed to the research project "Feminisms and Sexual and Gender Dissidence in the Global South," conducted by the CITCOM research group. She also collaborated on the research project "Post-Colonialism: Politics of Memory, Place, and Identity."

In 2018, she curated the cycle "For Us, By Us: Afro-diasporic Production in Portugal," organized by the ARTAFRICA project of the Center for Comparative Studies at the Faculty of Arts of the University of Lisbon, the BUALA portal, the Pantalassa Cultural Association, and the Portuguese Association of Anthropology. This was done in collaboration with Clara Saraiva, Marta Lança, and Raquel Schefer. In July 2019, she was part of the organizing committee of the International Conference Afroeuropeans: Challenged Black In/Visibilities, held at ISCTE.

In 2020, she was part of the program of the event organized annually by the Museum of the Portuguese Language to celebrate Portuguese Language Day. Slammer Roberta Estrela d'Alva closed the event with a slam round, in which artists such as Wellington Sabino and Edyoung Lennon also participated alongside poet Raquel Lima. She has collaborated with several musicians in search of sounds that dialogue with her poetry, such as Tapete, Tsjinlûd, MpexPhado, Lisbon Poetry Orchestra, GUME, among others.

Her poems have been published in various languages, and she has conducted performances and workshops on oral poetry at both national and international levels. Notably, she has focused on workshops on poetry, race, and gender: towards an intersectional poetic writing.
