= Case of Amarildo de Souza =

2013 police incident in Brazil

Disappearance of Amarildo de Souza
- Location: Favela da Rocinha; Rio de Janeiro, Brazil
- Date: July 14, 2013
- Attack type: Kidnapping; Torture; Homicide
- Deaths: 1
- Victim: Amarildo de Souza
- Perpetrator: Police officers from the Military Police of Rio de Janeiro
- Verdict: 1st degree: 12 officers pleaded guilty for torture followed by death; 2nd degree: 8 officers pleaded guilty for torture followed by death
- Convictions: Maj. Edson Raimundo dos Santos: 13 years, 7 months; Lt. Luiz Felipe de Medeiros: 10 years, 7 months; Pvt. Douglas Roberto Vital Machado: 11 years, 6 months; Pvt. Marlon Campos Reis: 10 years, 4 months; Pvt. Jorge Luiz Gonçalves Coelho: 10 years, 4 months; Pvt. Jairo da Conceição Ribas: 10 years, 4 months; Pvt. Anderson César Soares Maia: 10 years, 4 months; Pvt. Wellington Tavares da Silva: 10 years, 4 months; Pvt. Fábio Brasil da Rocha da Graça: 10 years, 4 months; Pvt. Felipe Maia Queiroz Moura: 10 years, 4 months; Rachel de Souza Peixoto: 9 years, 4 months; Thaís Rodrigues Gusmão: 9 years, 4 months

Amarildo de Souza
- Born: Amarildo Dias de Souza; 1970; Rio de Janeiro, Brazil
- Disappeared: July 14, 2013 (aged 42–43); Favela da Rocinha; Rio de Janeiro, Brazil
- Status: Missing for 13 years, 3 months and 17 days
- Spouse: Elizabete Gomes da Silva (m. 1986)
- Children: 6

On July 14, 2013, Amarildo de Souza, a 43-year-old bricklayer from the Rocinha favela in Rio de Janeiro, Brazil, was called in for questioning by Unidade de Polícia Pacificadora (UPP) officers on his way home from the market. Believed to be connected to drug trafficking activity in the favela despite having no prior involvement in illegal activity, de Souza was brought in for questioning during Operation Armed Peace, during which roughly 300 officers from Rocinha's UPP force flooded the favela in order to arrest drug traffickers. It was during this two-day long raid that de Souza was brought to the police station and never seen again.

According to police testimony, de Souza was released after questioning in the UPP base in Rocinha. Cameras show de Souza being taken into the base, yet all cameras and GPS systems belonging to the UPPs suspiciously malfunctioned upon his supposed release, providing no evidence as to his whereabouts after the questioning. A skeleton found in Resende, Brazil on September 27, 2013 was examined to determine if it was the body of de Souza, but the results were inconclusive. To date, de Souza's body has not been found.

== Investigation ==
According to initial police reports, de Souza was released after questioning. De Souza was classified as “missing” for more than two months after his disappearance, but public outrage eventually grew to force authorities to respond to the suspicious circumstances of his disappearance. By October 2013, twenty-four policemen and UPP commander Edson Santos were accused of torture, concealing a body, procedural fraud, and conspiracy. Four officers had a direct role in de Souza's disappearance and subsequent torture, twelve stood guard, and eight were present but failed to help the victim. Major Santos was found to have bribed a Rocinha resident, Lucia Helena da Silva Batista, to lie in her eyewitness testimony of what happened to de Souza, linking the murder to a local drug trafficker rather than the military police. To date, de Souza's body has not been found.

In June 2015, it was announced that investigations into de Souza's disappearance in response to new images from security cameras close to the UPP station in Rocinha. The goal of the reopened investigation is to determine why BOPE (Batalhão de Operações Policiais Especiais, a special unit of the military police trained extensively in urban warfare to combat drug gangs) entered Rocinha on the night of de Souza's disappearance. While initial analysis of the images obtained of the BOPE trucks was inconclusive, computer enhanced imaging determined that a volume compatible with that of a human corpse was sealed in a motorcycle cover and placed in one of the BOPE trucks. It was determined that de Souza was tortured with electric shocks and suffocated with plastic bags for more than two hours before he was drowned in a bucket.

In the city of Rio, roughly 16% of all registered homicides between 2010 and 2015 took place by the hands of on-duty police officers. As of April 2015, 183 of 220 investigations into police killings were still open, and only one case led to the indictment of a police officer. In this context, de Souza's case became a symbol of the fight against police abuse. “Where is Amarildo?” served as the rallying call of protesters, with #WhereIsAmarildo and #OndeEstaoAmarildo used extensively on social media.

== Controversy ==
De Souza's case is controversial in that twenty-five UPP officers were charged with torture followed by death. The UPPs were first established in 2008 in Santa Marta as a method to increase security in anticipation of the 2014 World Cup and 2016 Olympic Games. They were created to wrest control of the favelas from gangs and militias back to the Brazilian government, effectively integrating favela residents into the formal city

The design of the UPPs addresses the issue of rampant police brutality and corruption in Rio by using only fresh recruits recently graduated from police academy and giving special training in human rights issues. However, despite the successful pacification of favelas with UPPs installed, the relationship between favela residents and UPPs is often marked by mutual distrust. In one study, interviewed favela residents reported concern over the possibility that the UPPs would become the “new boss” of the favela, replacing the ousted gang leaders and controlling the favelas without integrating them into the city as promised by the government.

Among the criticisms of the UPPs is the allegation that they possibly have a role in the rising number of missing persons in pacified favelas, a concern highlighted by de Souza's disappearance in 2013. The number of homicides per 100,000 people in Rio fell from 6122 in 2007 to 4030 in 2012, and the rate of resistance killings by police decreased by 51.5% in pacified favelas. At the same time, the number of missing persons in Rio's pacified favelas and its impoverished peripheral communities increased by 33 percent since 2007, one year before the creation of the UPPs. Proponents of the UPPs argue that the rise in non-lethal crimes – including unsolved disappearances – is a consequence of better reporting: it is possible that disappearances that occurred prior to pacification went unreported due to fear of revenge by gang members.

On the other hand, critics of the program argue that Rio's police forces have an interest in not reporting “resistance killings,” defined by Amnesty International as “killings by on-duty police which are legitimized on the grounds of self-defense”. Because the state gives monetary bonuses to UPPs for killing fewer people in an effort to reverse the culture of violence prevalent in Rio's police forces, it is possible that police dispose of evidence related to resistance killings before an official investigation can occur. Between 2005 and 2014, 8,466 cases of killings by police were recorded in the state of Rio de Janeiro. While this overall rate began to fall in 2010, there was a 39.4 percent increase in resistance killings in Rio de Janeiro state between 2013 and 2014. As global scrutiny is placed on Brazil's social maladies and the state's response to them in anticipation of the 2016 Olympic Games, critics of the UPPs purport that police forces are disguising resistance killings as disappearances in order to improve public perception.

== See also ==
- List of people who disappeared mysteriously: post-1970
