= Sugarloaf Mountain =

Peak in Rio de Janeiro, Brazil

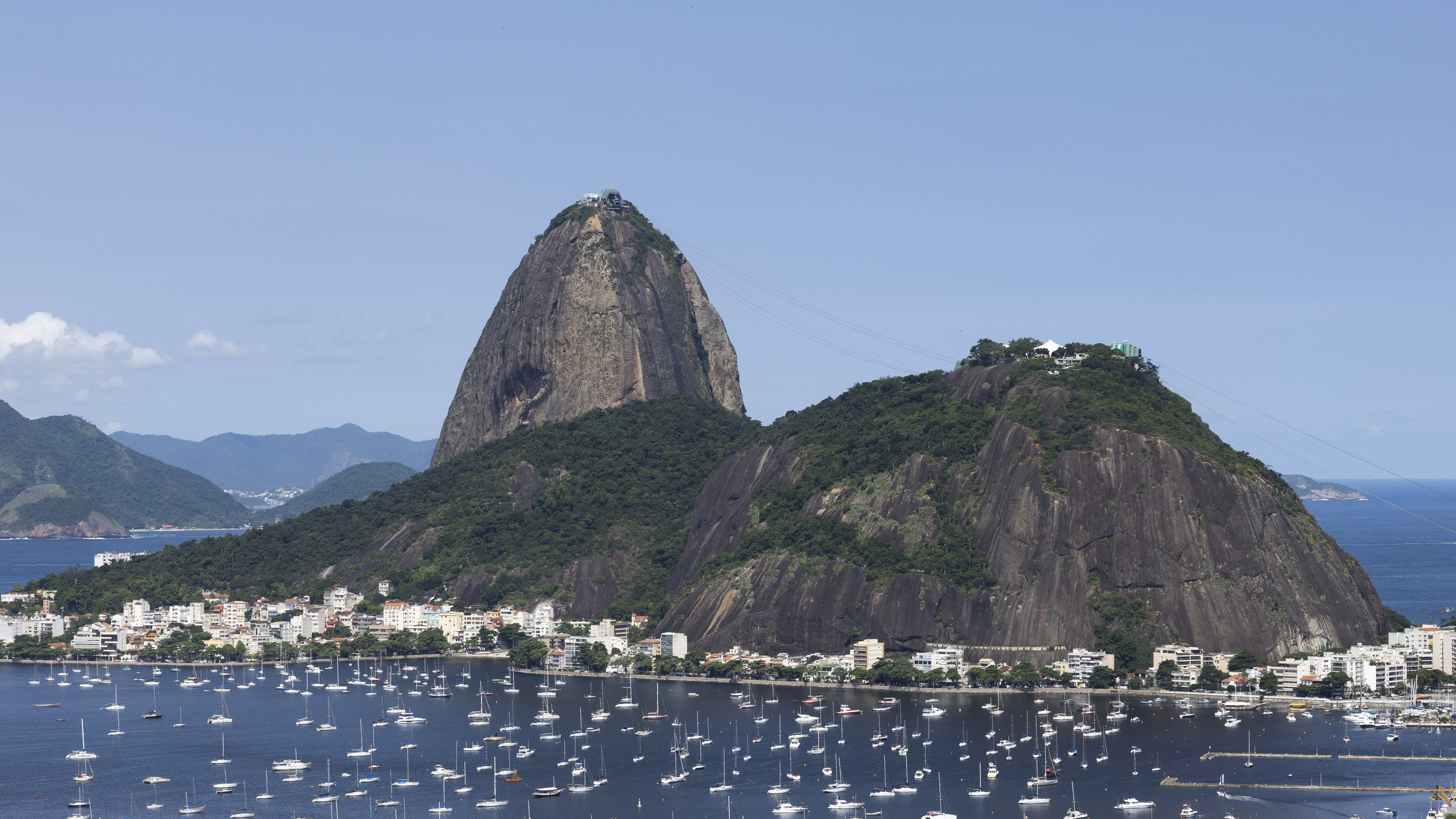

Highest point
- Elevation: 396 m (1,299 ft)
- Coordinates: 22°56′58″S 43°09′24″W

Geography
- Location within Rio de Janeiro
- Location: Rio de Janeiro

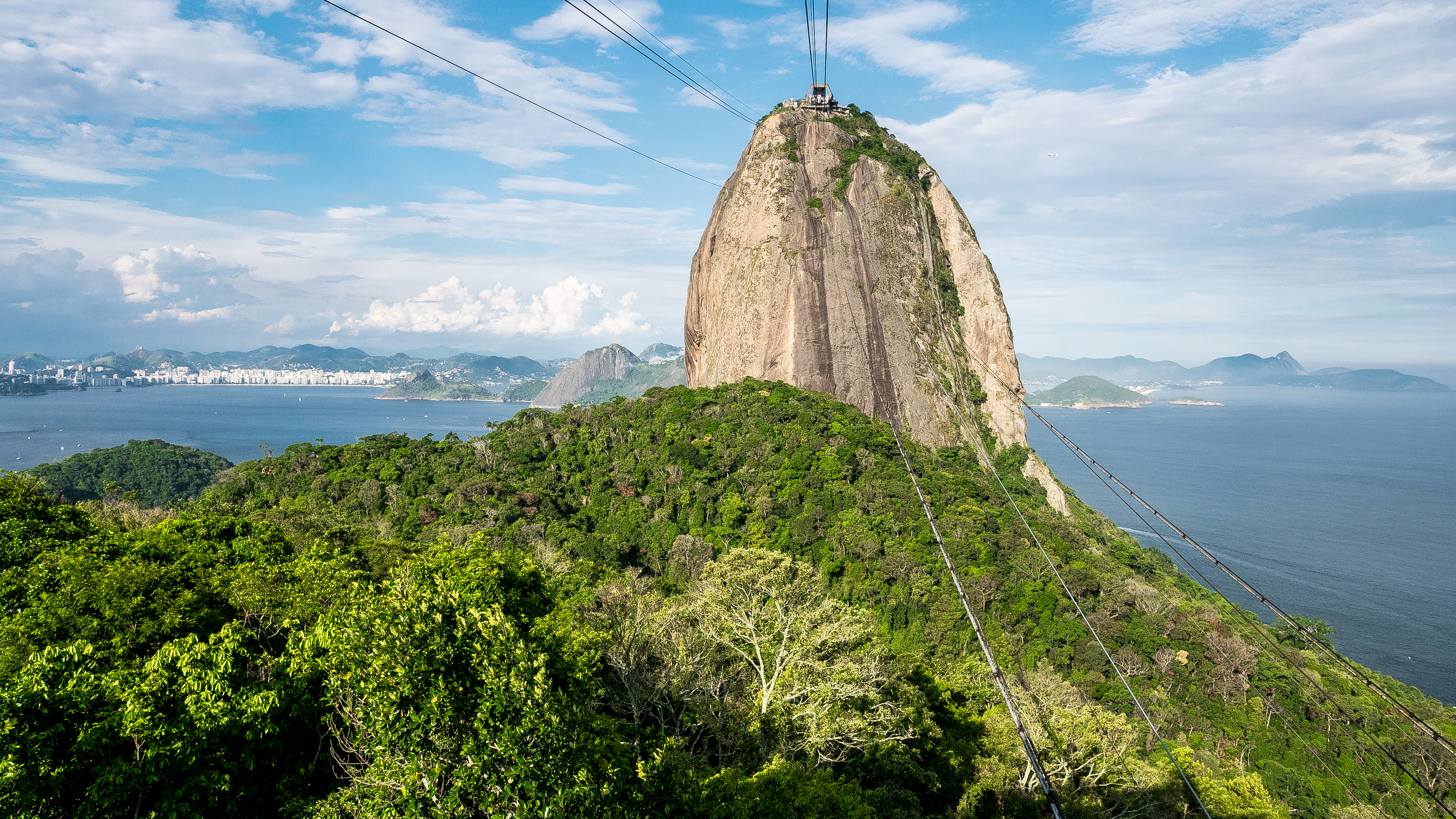
Sugarloaf seen from Urca hill.

Sugarloaf view from Botafogo beach

Sunrise in Rio de Janeiro with Sugarloaf Mountain, as seen from Tijuca Forest

Sugarloaf Mountain (Portuguese: Pão de Açúcar, pronounced [ˈpɐ̃w̃ d(ʒi) aˈsukaʁ]) is a peak situated in Rio de Janeiro, Brazil, on a peninsula at the mouth of Guanabara Bay. Rising 396 m (1,299 ft) above the harbor, the peak is named for its resemblance to the traditional shape of concentrated refined sugarloaf. It is known worldwide for its cable car and panoramic views of the city and beyond.

The mountain is one of several monolithic granite and quartz mountains that rise straight from the water's edge around Rio de Janeiro. Geologically, it is considered part of a family of steep-sided rock outcroppings known as bornhardts.

The mountain is protected by the Sugarloaf Mountain and Urca Hill Natural Monument, created in 2006. This became part of a World Heritage Site declared by UNESCO in 2012.

== Origins of the name ==
The name Sugarloaf was coined in the 16th century by the Portuguese during the heyday of sugarcane trade in Brazil due to sugar imports from the Portuguese conquest of Goa, according to historian Vieira Fazenda. Blocks of sugar were placed in conical molds made of clay to be transported on ships. The form of the peak reminded them of the well-known resulting "sugarloaf" shape, and the nickname has since been extended to be a general descriptor for formations of this kind.

== Cable car ==
A glass-walled cable car (bondinho or, more formally, teleférico), capable of holding 65 people, runs along a 1,400 m (4,600 ft) route between the peaks of Sugarloaf and Morro da Urca every 20 minutes. The original cable car line was built in 1912, rebuilt around 1972–73, and rebuilt again in 2008. The cable car goes from a ground station, at the base of Morro da Babilônia, to Morro da Urca and thence to Sugarloaf's summit.

=== Reaching the summit ===
To reach the summit, passengers take two cable cars. The first ascends to the shorter Morro da Urca, 220 m (722 ft) high. The second car ascends to Pão de Açúcar. The Swiss-made bubble-shaped cars offer passengers 360° views of the surrounding city. The ascent takes three minutes.

=== Timeline ===
- 1907 – Brazilian engineer Augusto Ferreira Ramos had the idea of linking the hills through a path in the air.
- 1910 – The same engineer founded the Society of Sugar Loaf, and in the same year, the works were started. The project was commissioned in Germany and built by Brazilian workers. All parts were taken by climbing mountains or lifted by steel cables.
- 1912 – Opening of the cableway, the first in Brazil and the third of this kind worldwide; the first cable cars were made of coated wood and were used for 61 years.
- 1973 – The current models of cars were put into operation. This increased the carrying capacity by almost ten times.
- 2009 – Inauguration of the next generation of cable cars that had already been purchased and are on display at the base of Red Beach
- 2020 – Closed in March and reopened in August
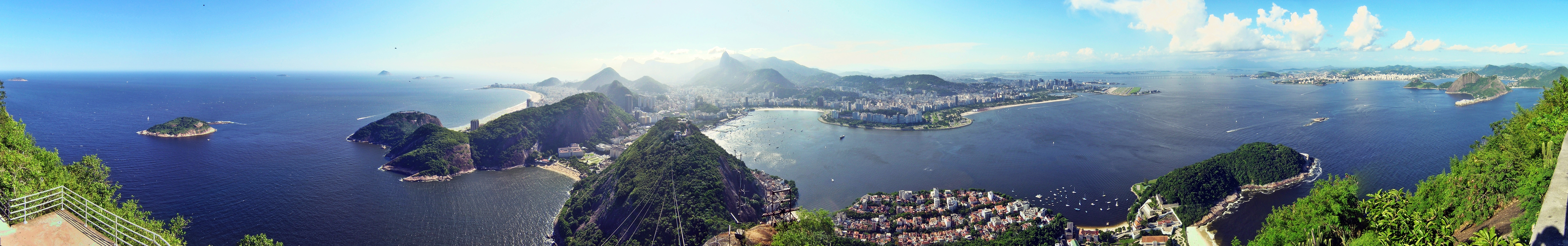
Panoramic view of Rio de Janeiro and Niterói (right) from Sugarloaf

== Rock climbing ==
There are rock climbing routes on Sugarloaf that are mostly multipitch and are a mixture of sport and trad. There are also two other mountains in the area with technical rock climbing, Morro da Babilônia and Morro da Urca. Together, they form one of the largest urban climbing areas in the world, with more than 270 routes, between 1 and 10 pitches long.

== Gallery ==
=== Sugarloaf in art, 16th to 19th century ===
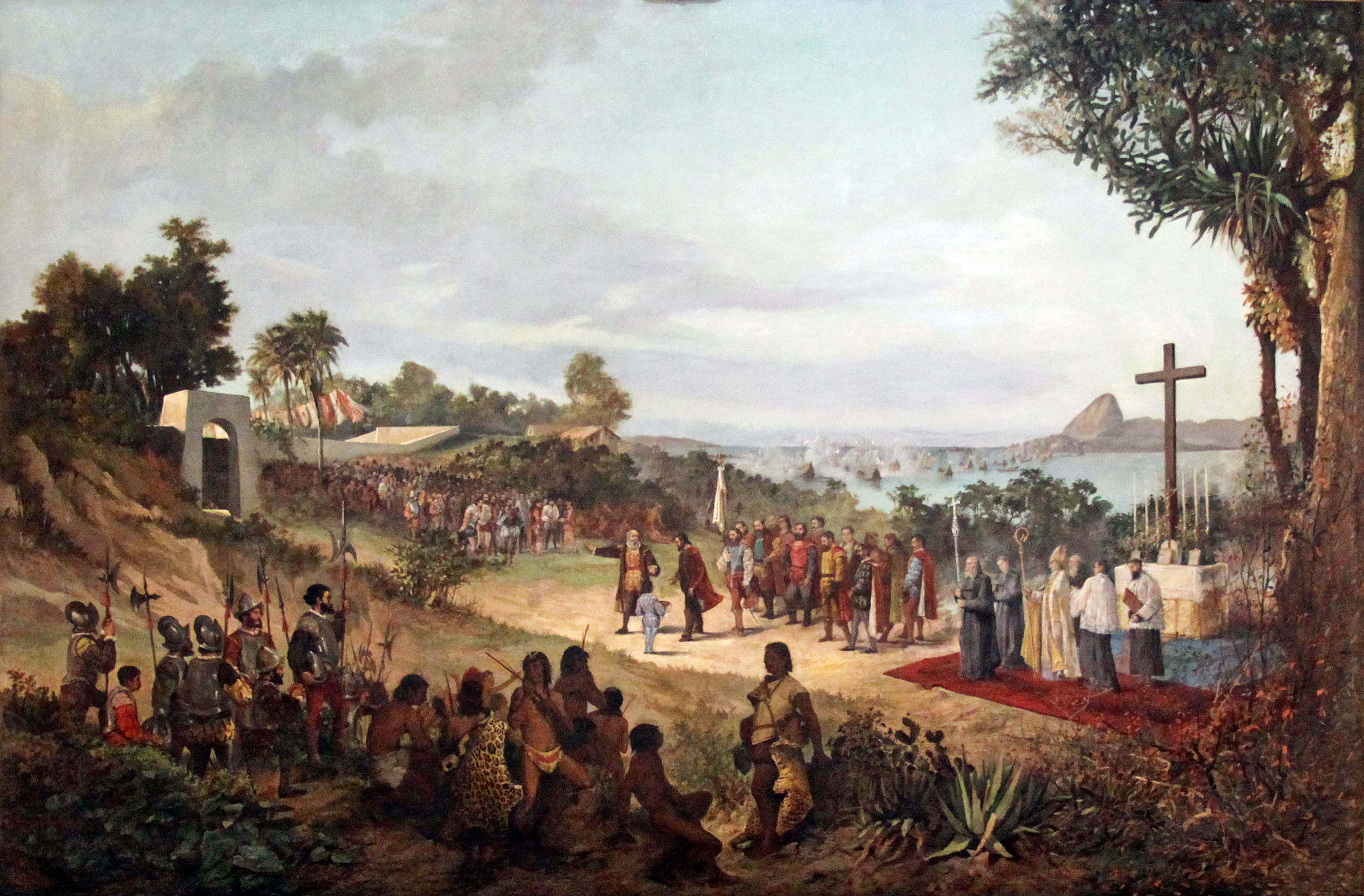
Founding of Rio de Janeiro in 1565. Sugarloaf is seen in the background.

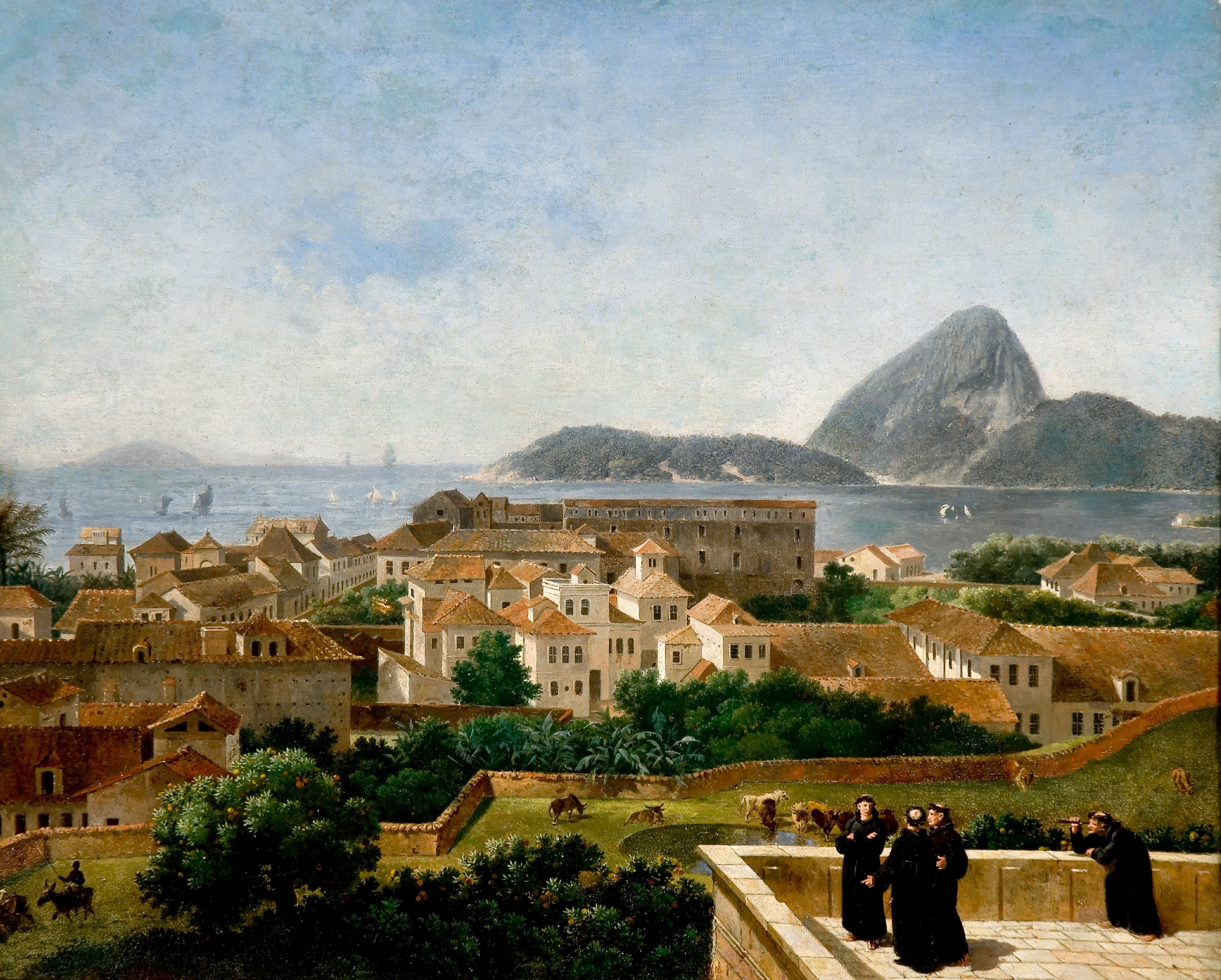
View of Sugarloaf from the terrace of the Convento de Santo Antônio (Convent of St. Anthony), c. 1816. Painting by Nicolas-Antoine Taunay.

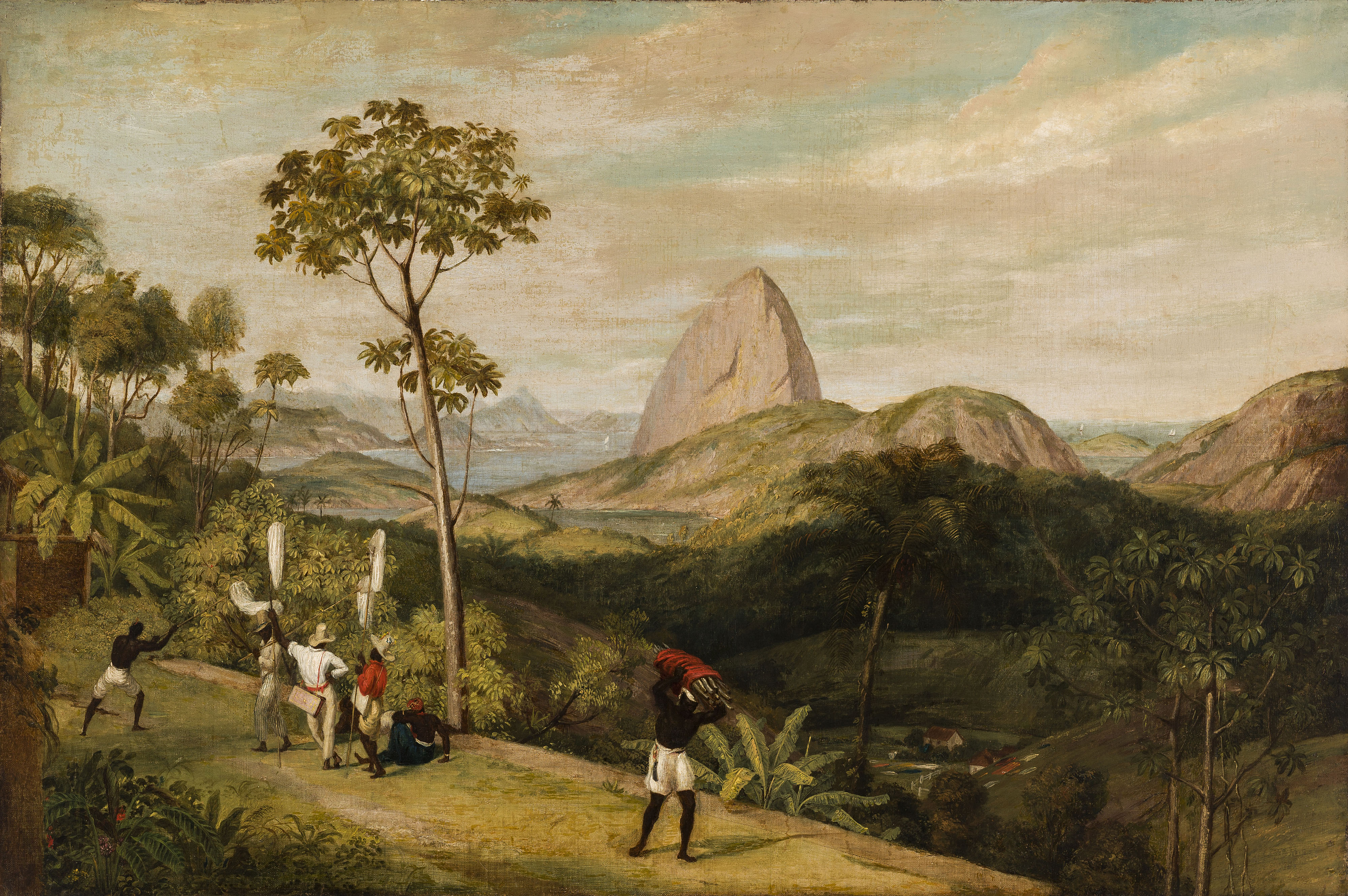
View of Sugarloaf from the Silvestre road, c. 1823. Painting by Charles Landseer.

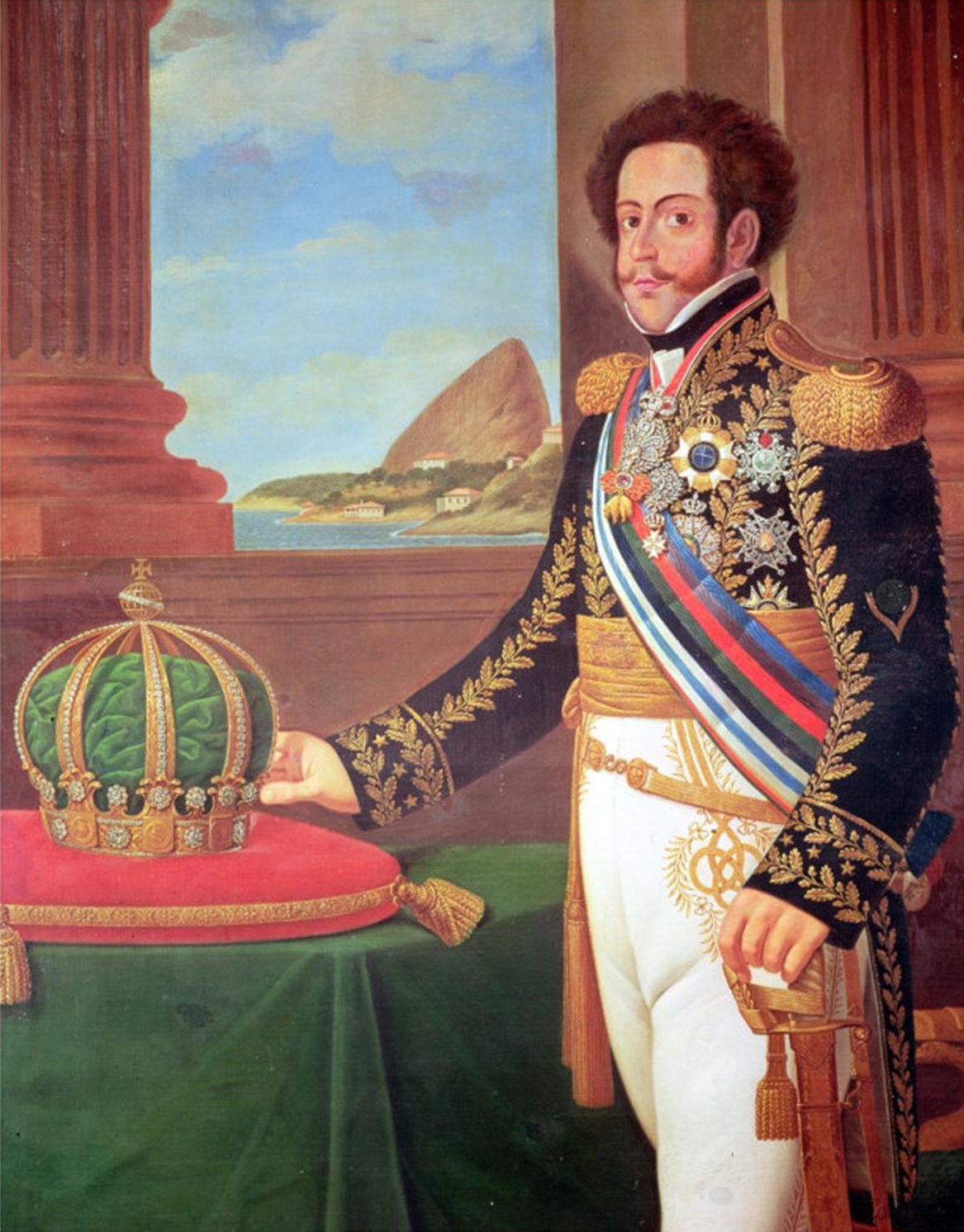
Emperor Pedro I of Brazil (also King of Portugal as Pedro IV) with his crown and the Sugarloaf in the background, c. 1825

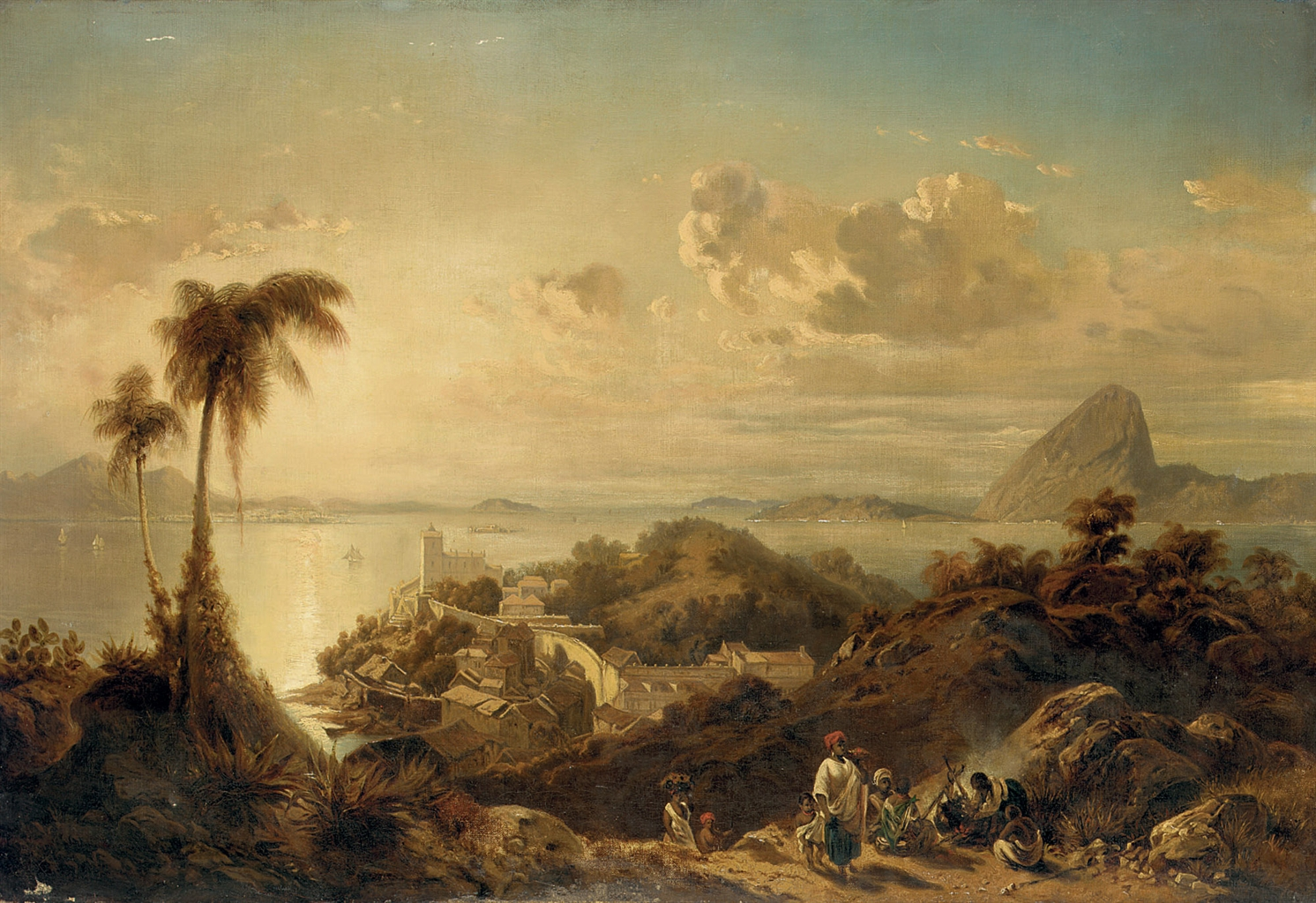
Sugarloaf and the Nossa Senhora da Glória do Outeiro (Our Lady of the Glory of the Hill) church as seen from the neighborhood of Glória, c. 1846. Painting by Eduard Hildebrandt.

=== 20th and 21st centuries ===
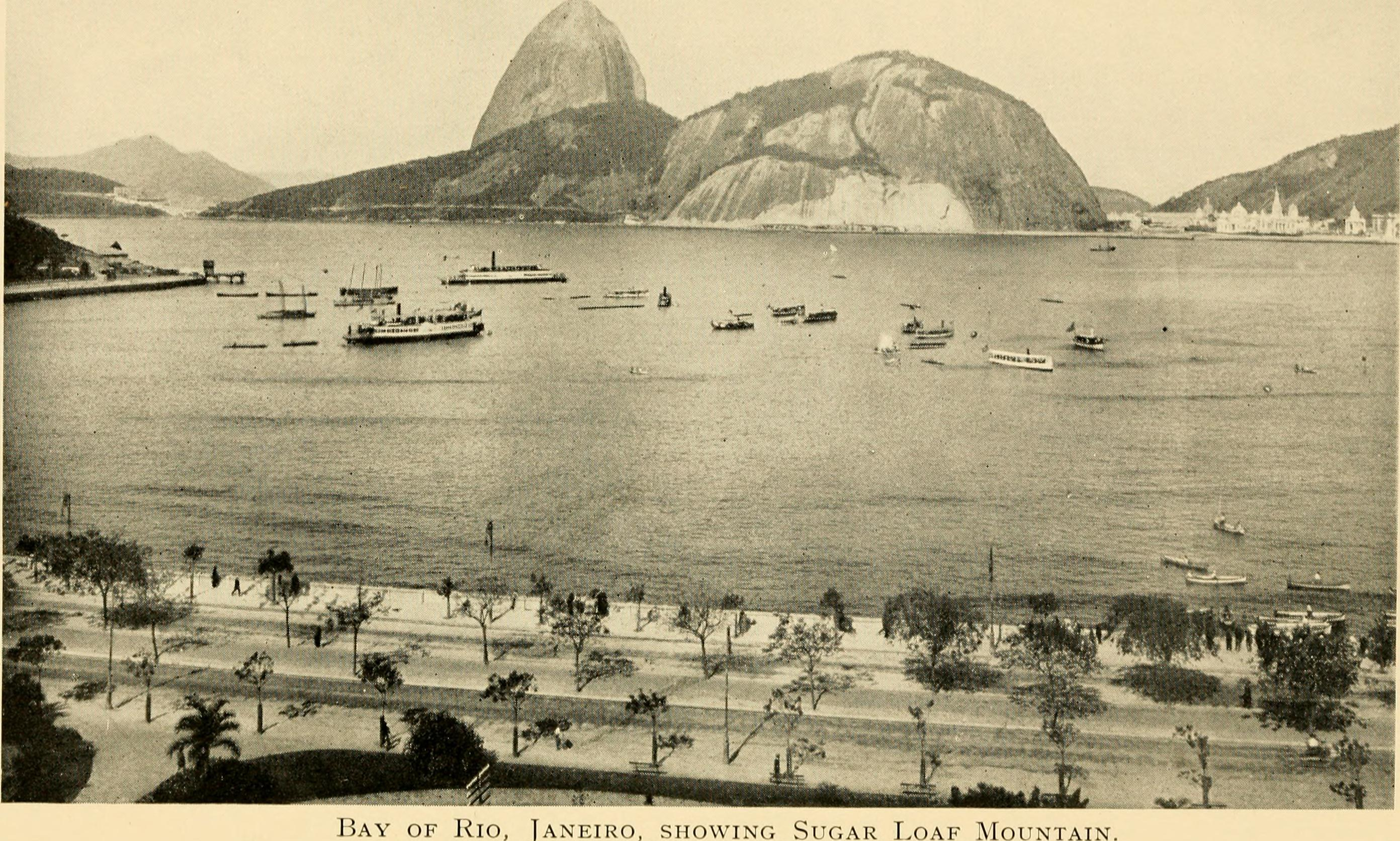
Sugarloaf in 1914

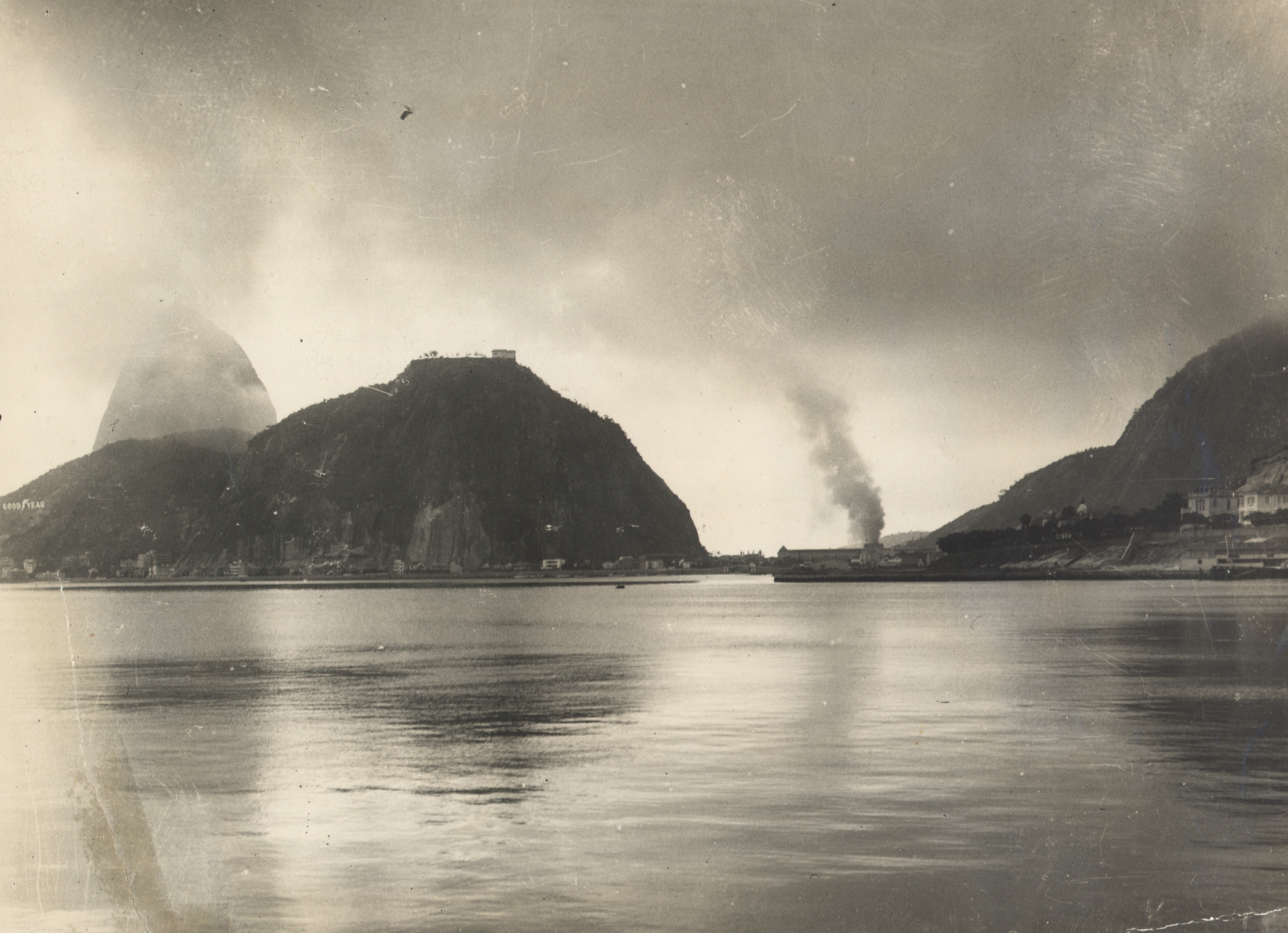
Military barracks near the Sugarloaf on fire during the communist uprising of 1935

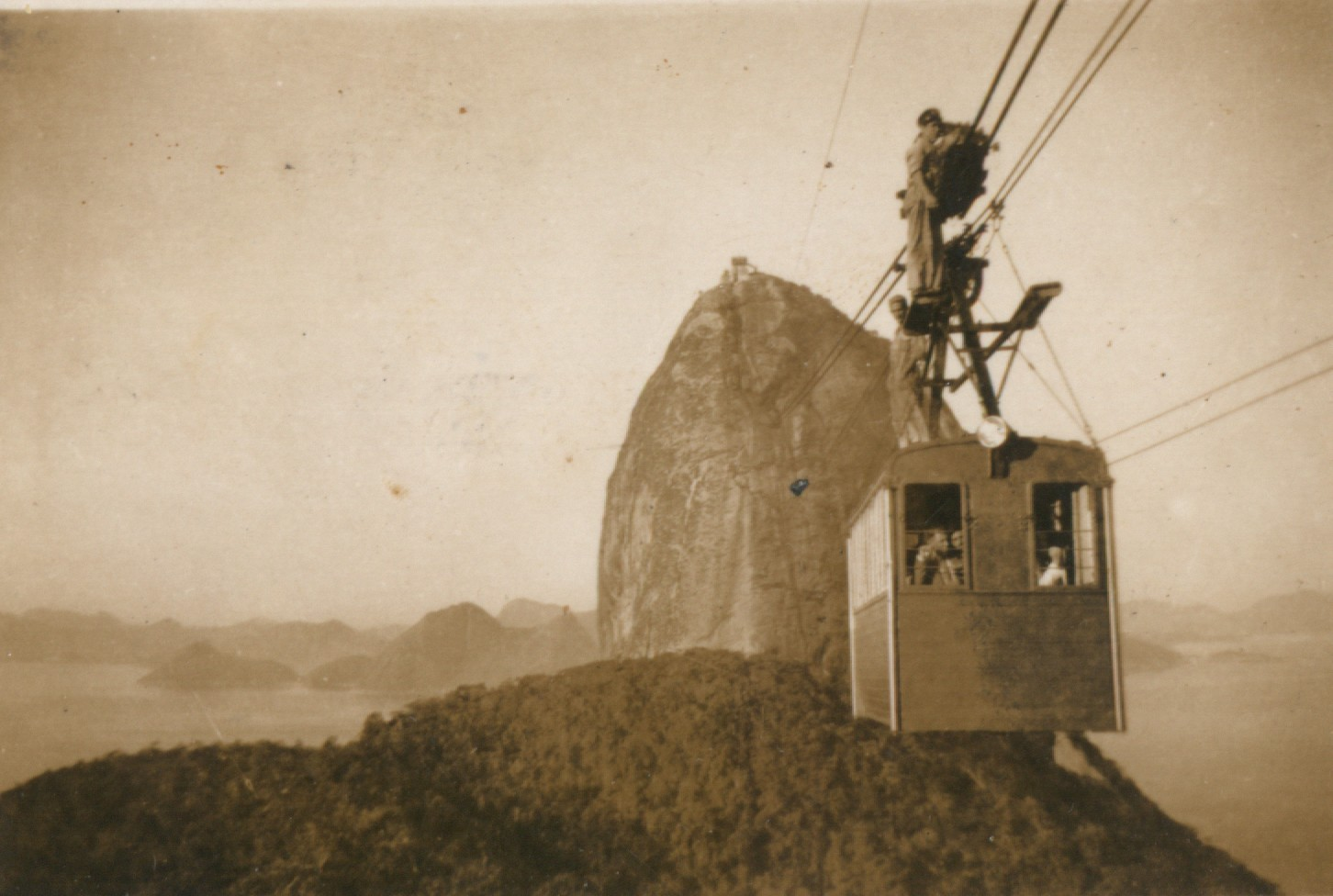
The Sugarloaf wooden cable car in the 1940s

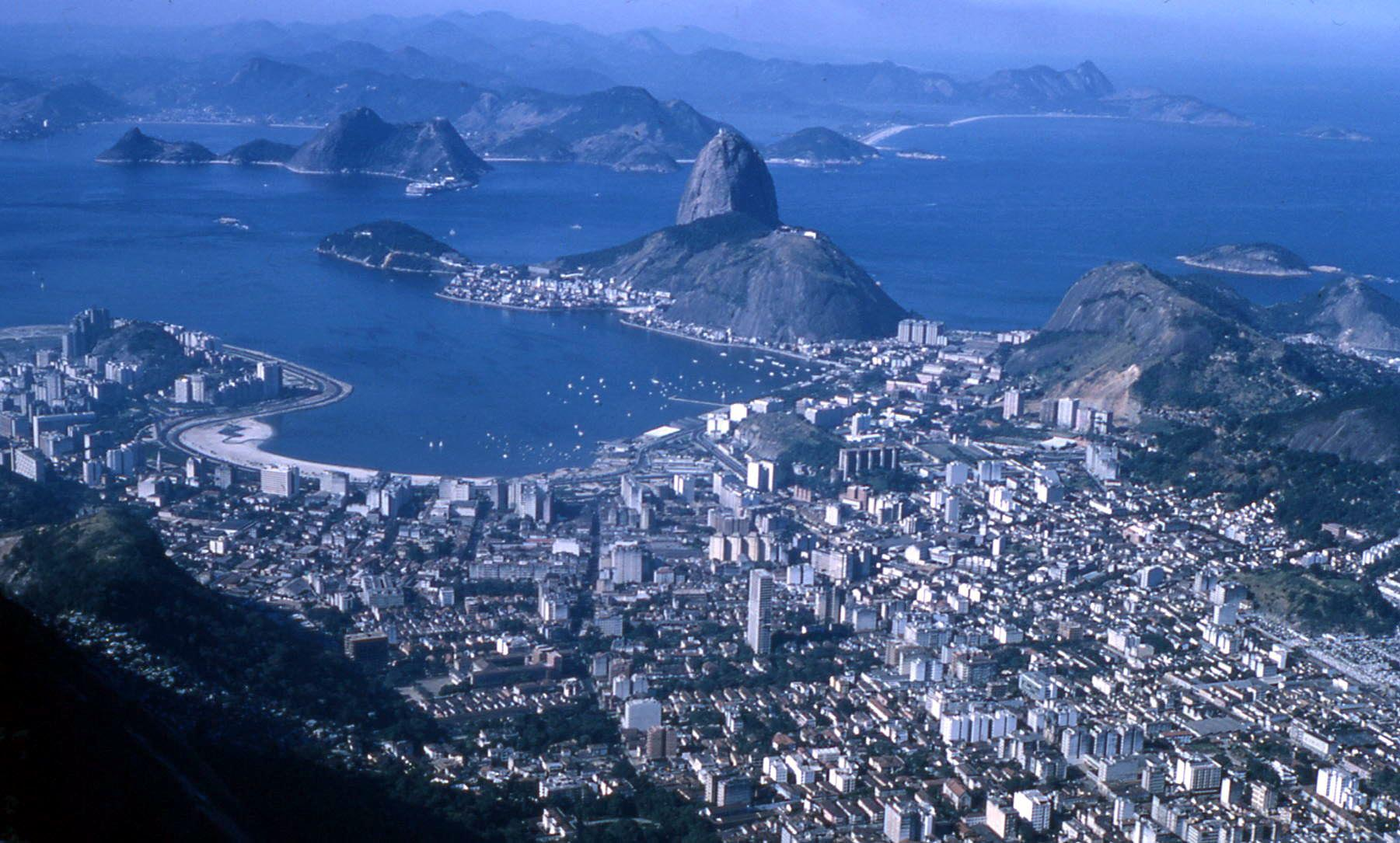
Higher aerial view, 1967

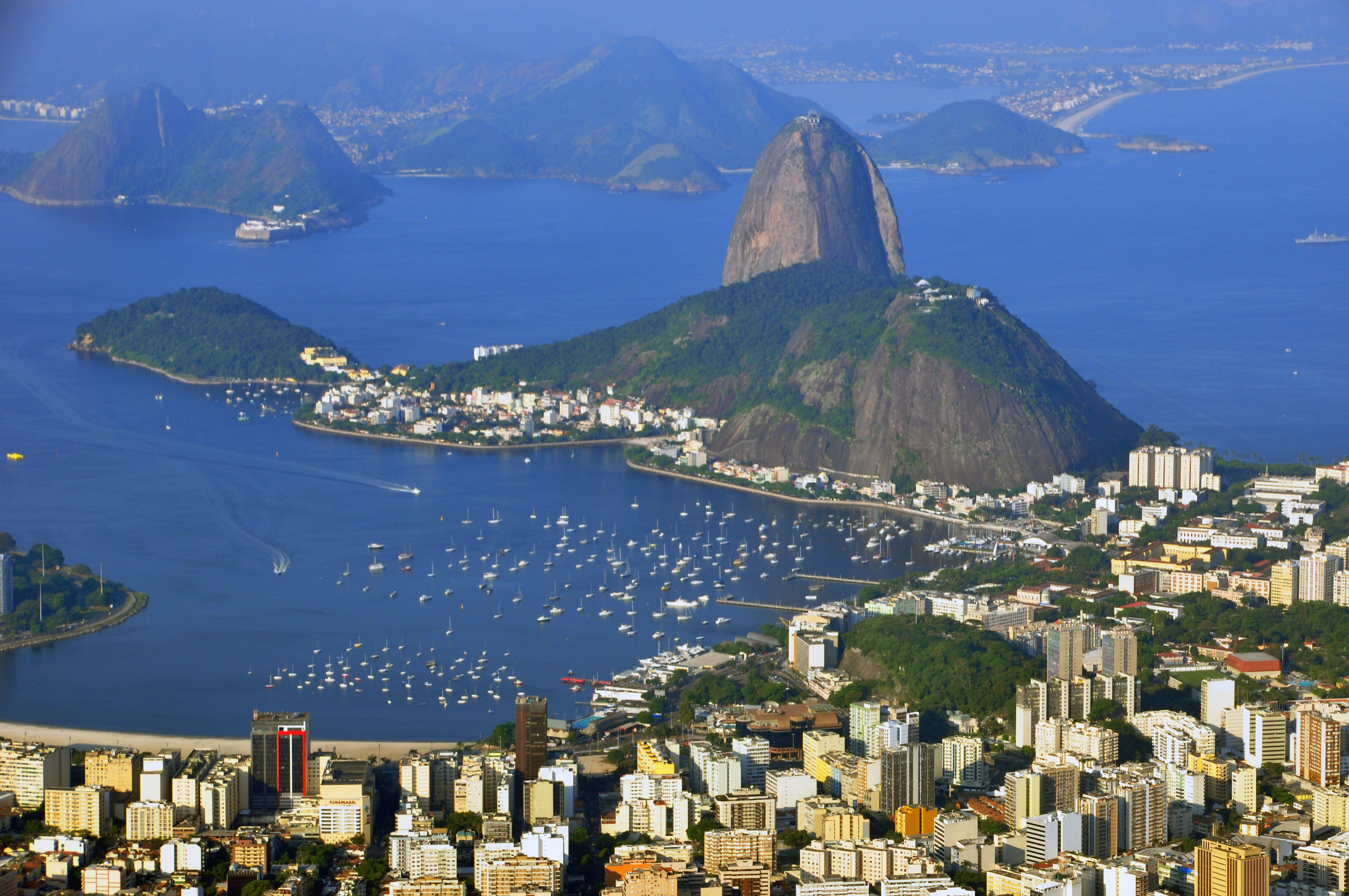
View of Sugarloaf from Christ the Redeemer on Corcovado

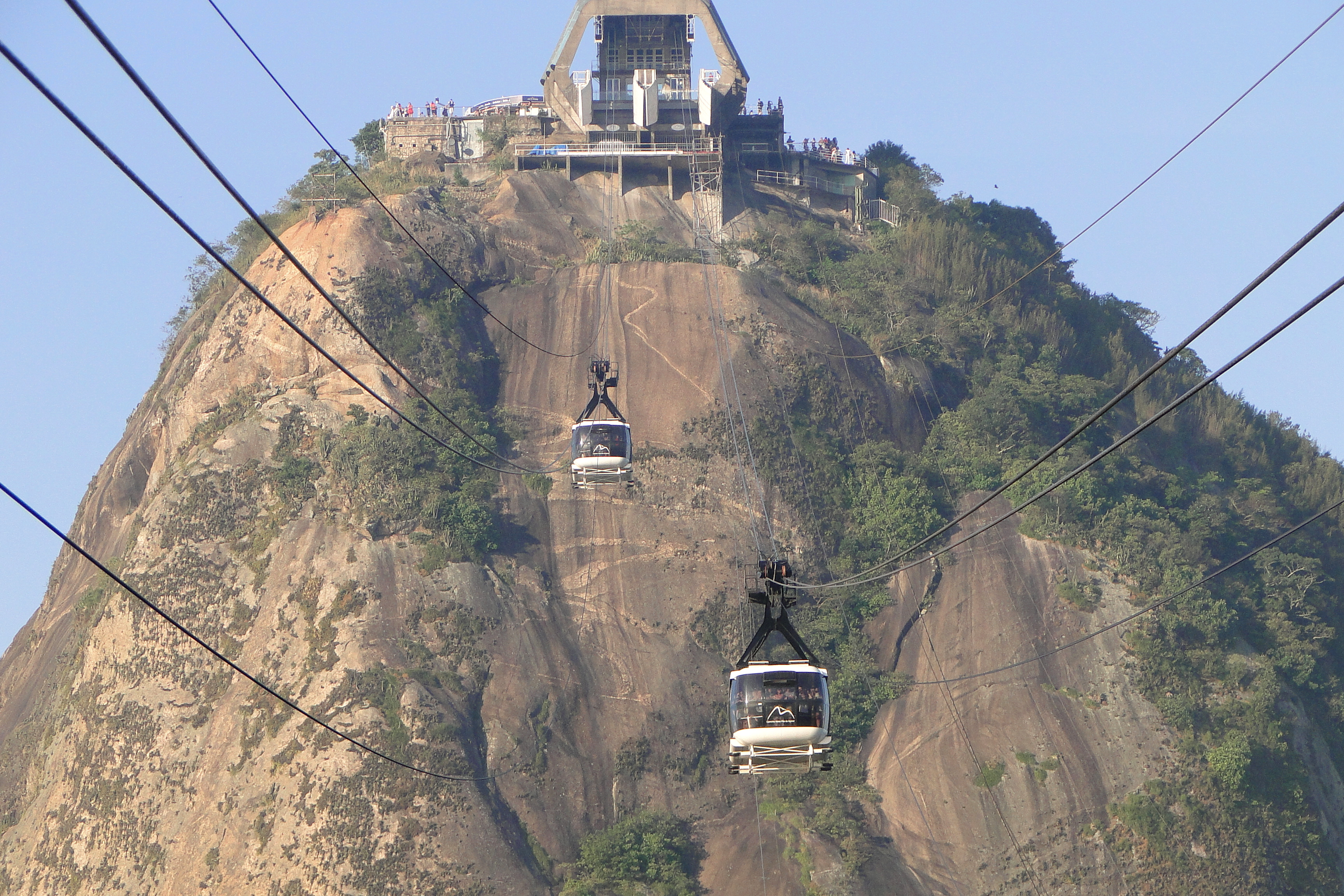
Cable cars from Sugarloaf Mountain

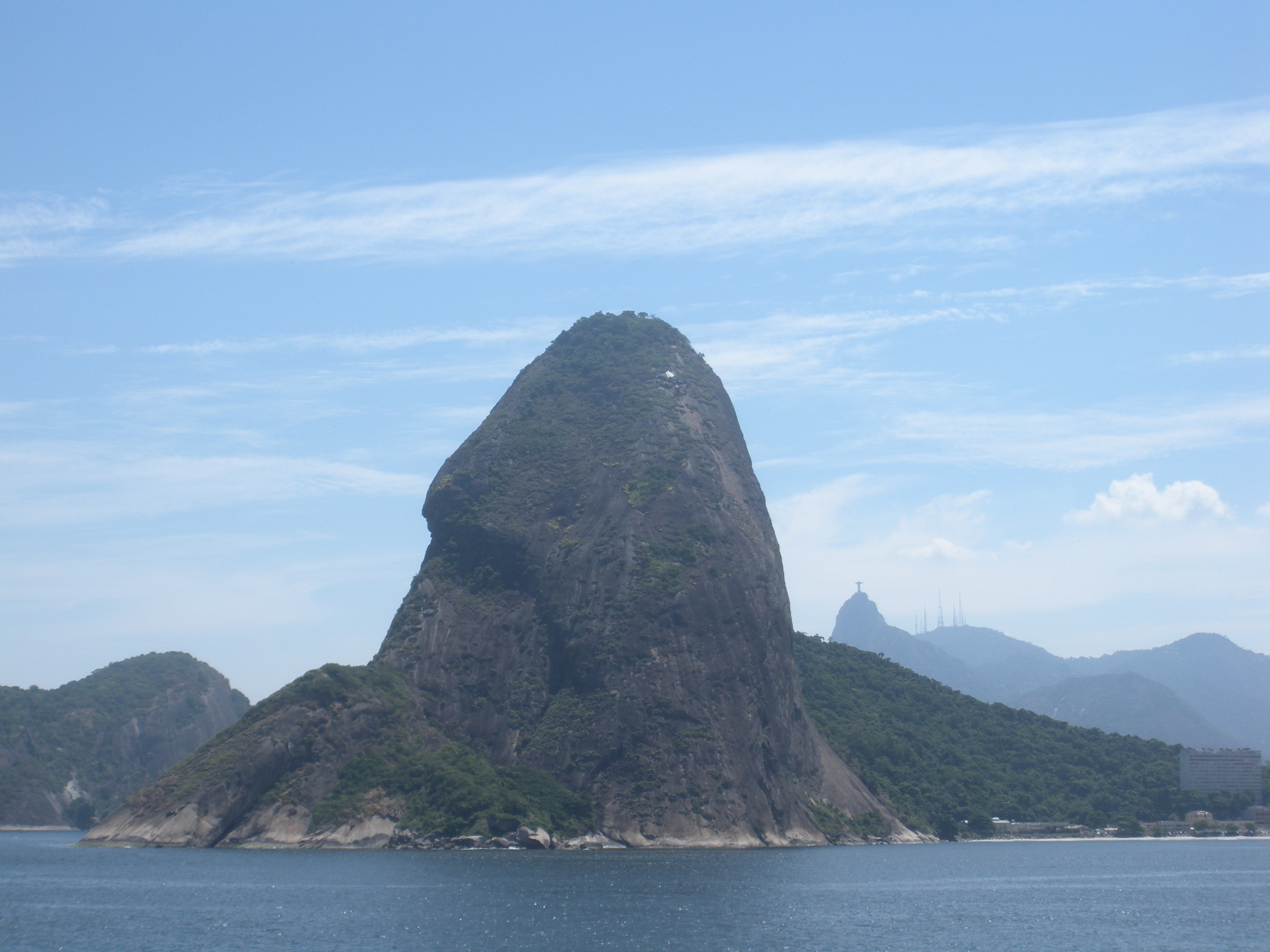
View of Sugarloaf Mountain from seaward side; Corcovado and Christ the Redeemer are seen in the background.

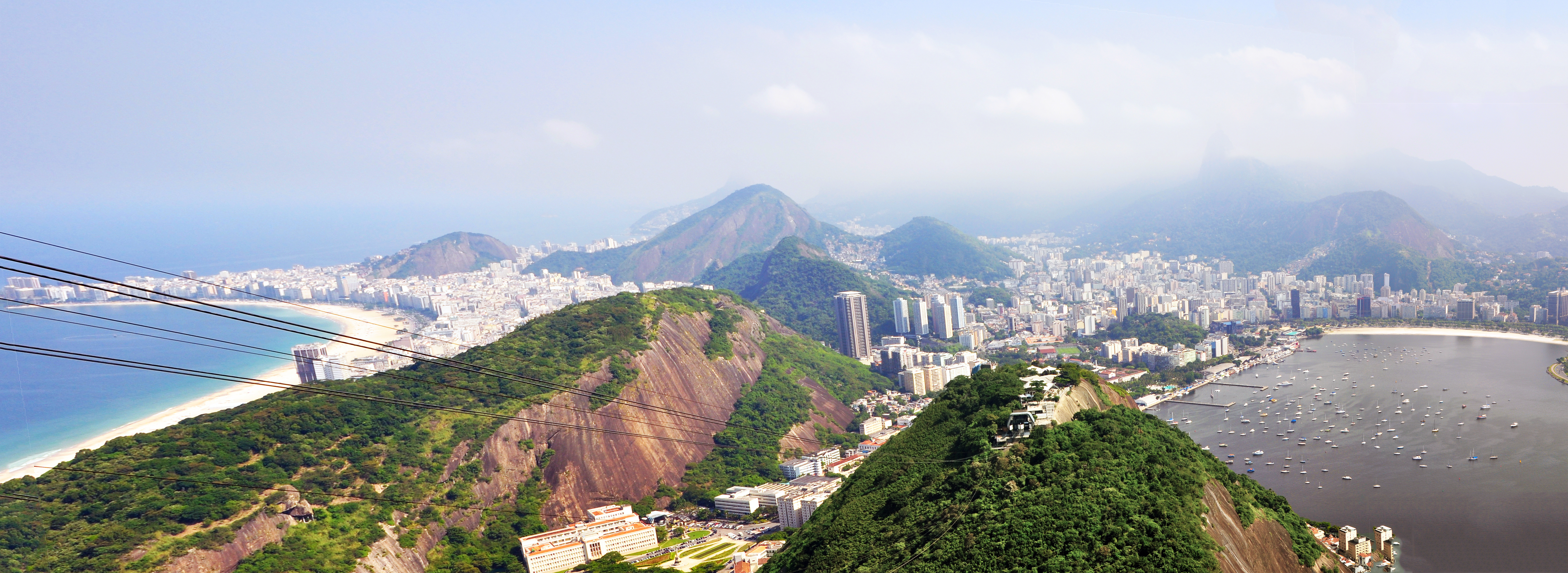
View of Rio de Janeiro from the Sugarloaf

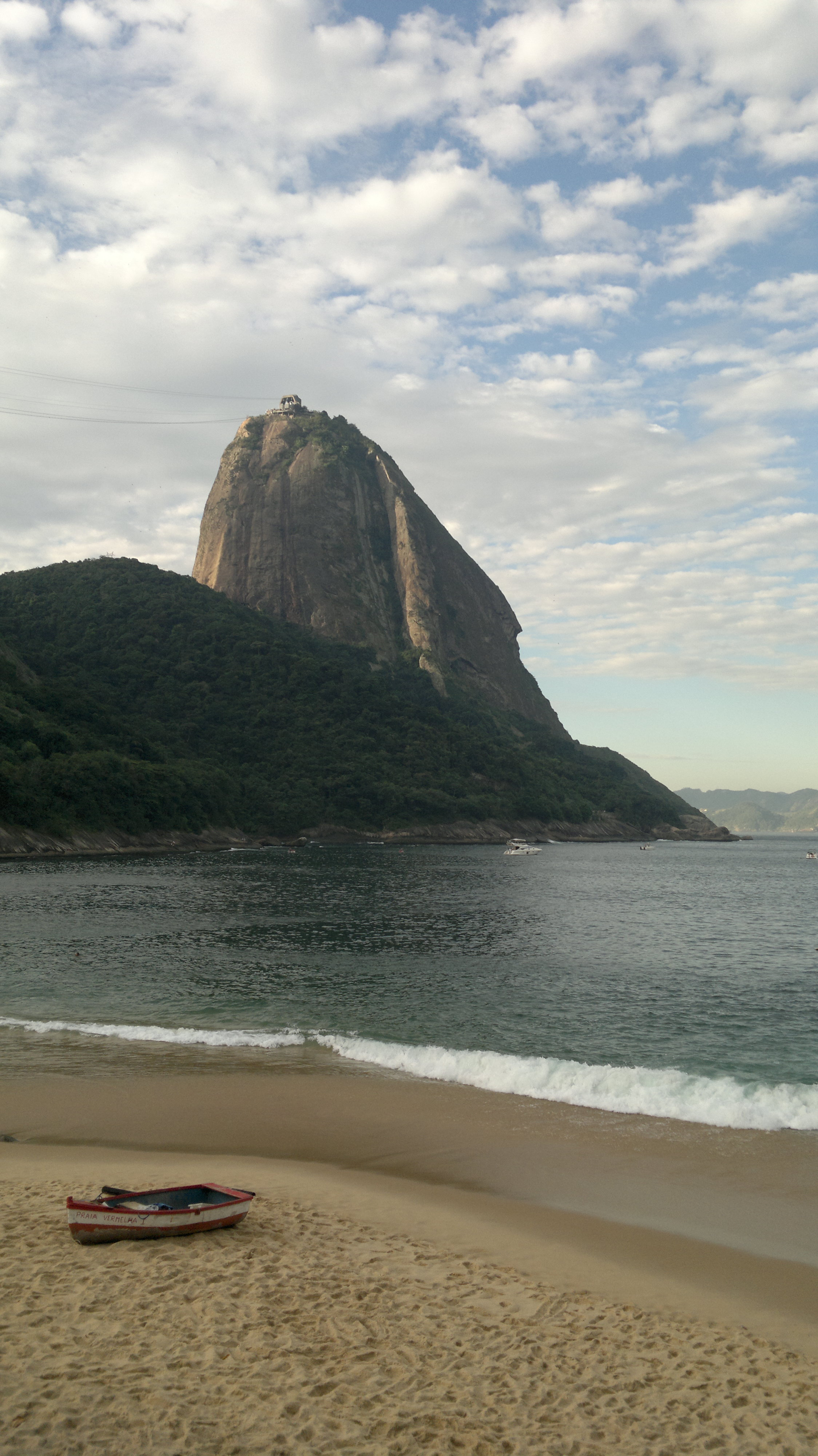
Sugarloaf as seen from Praia Vermelha (Red Beach)

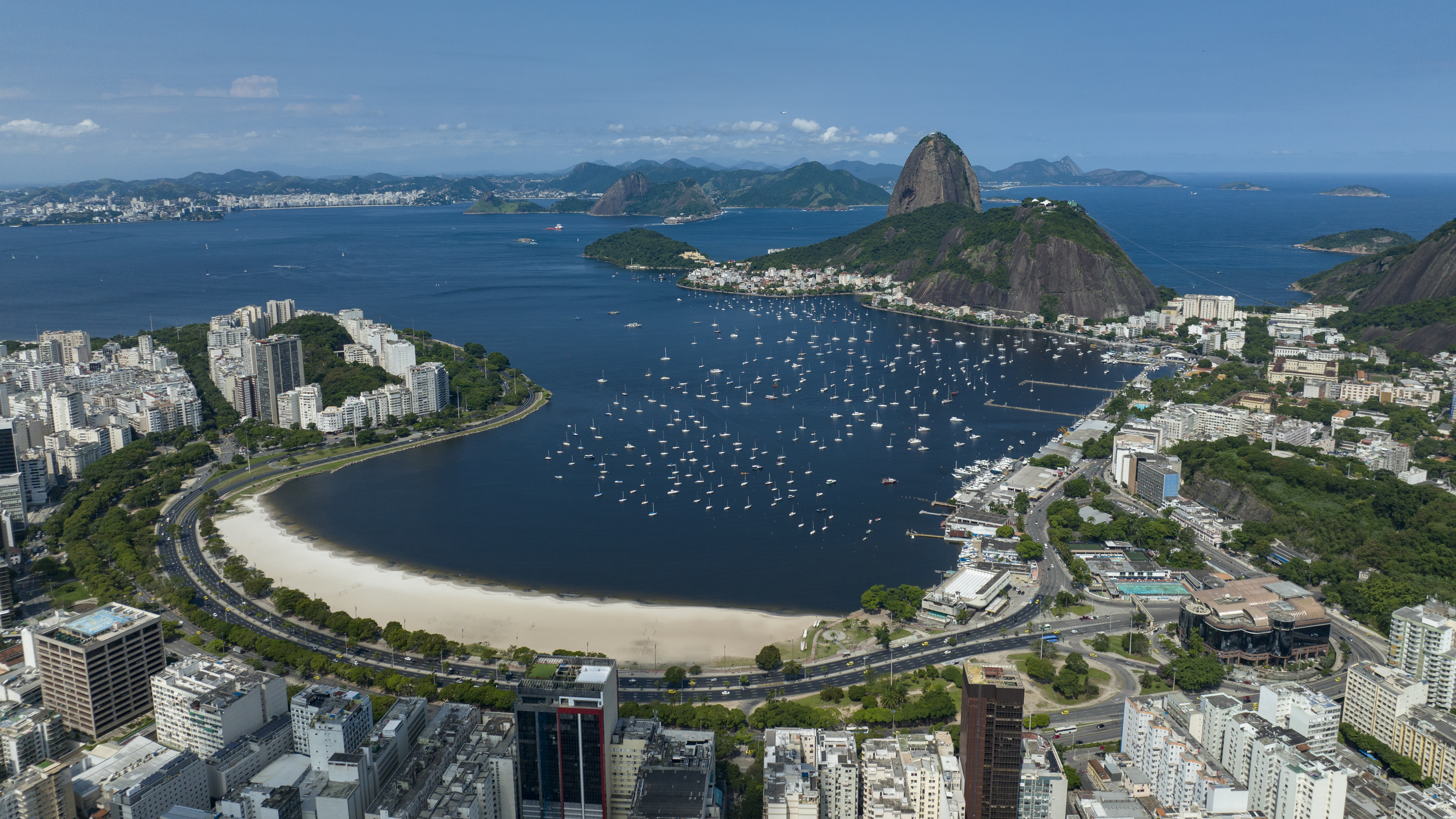
Botafogo Bay and Sugarloaf

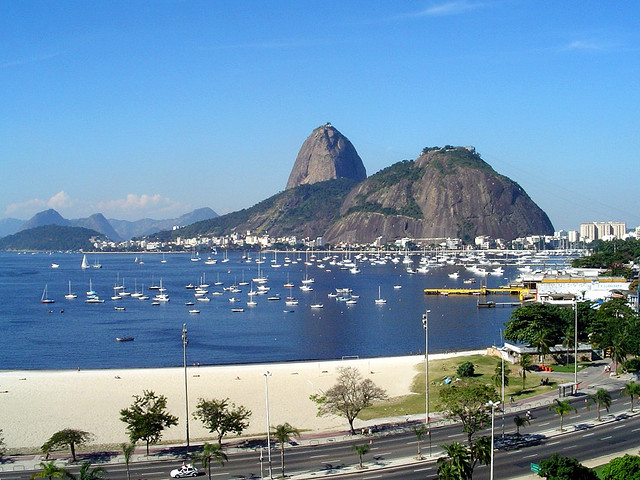
Botafogo Bay and beach with Sugarloaf in the background

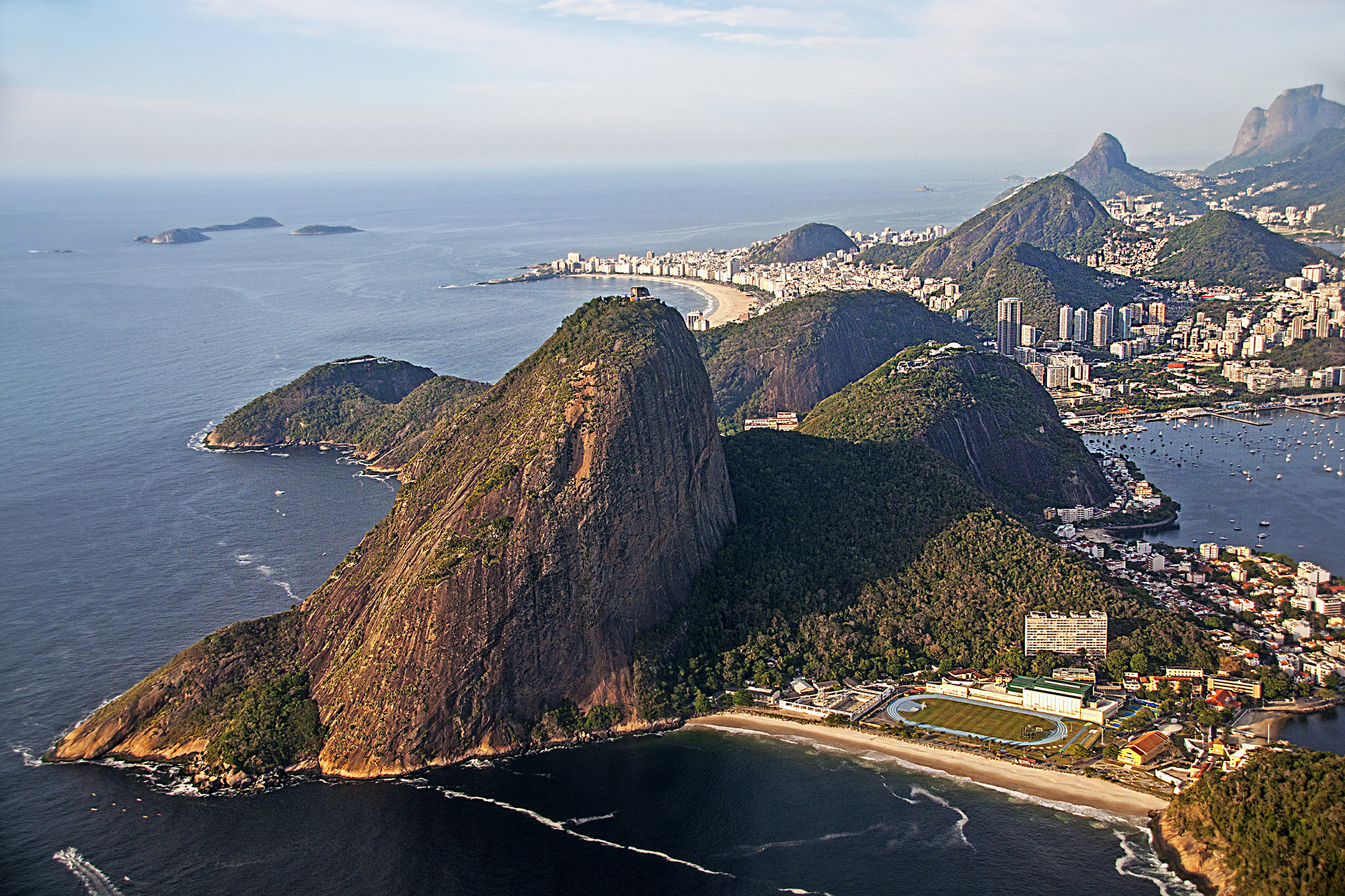
Aerial view

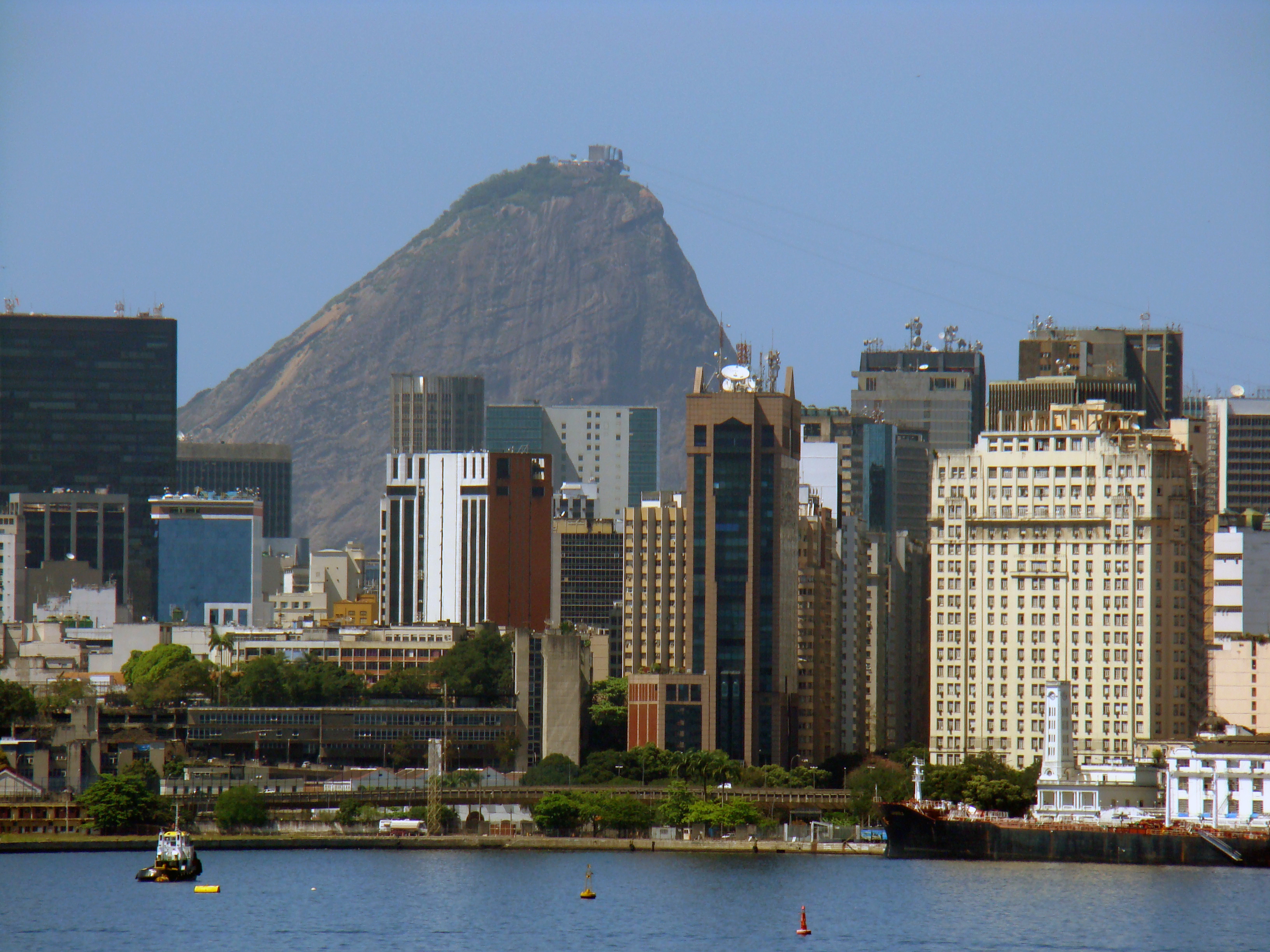
Sugarloaf with Downtown Rio in the foreground

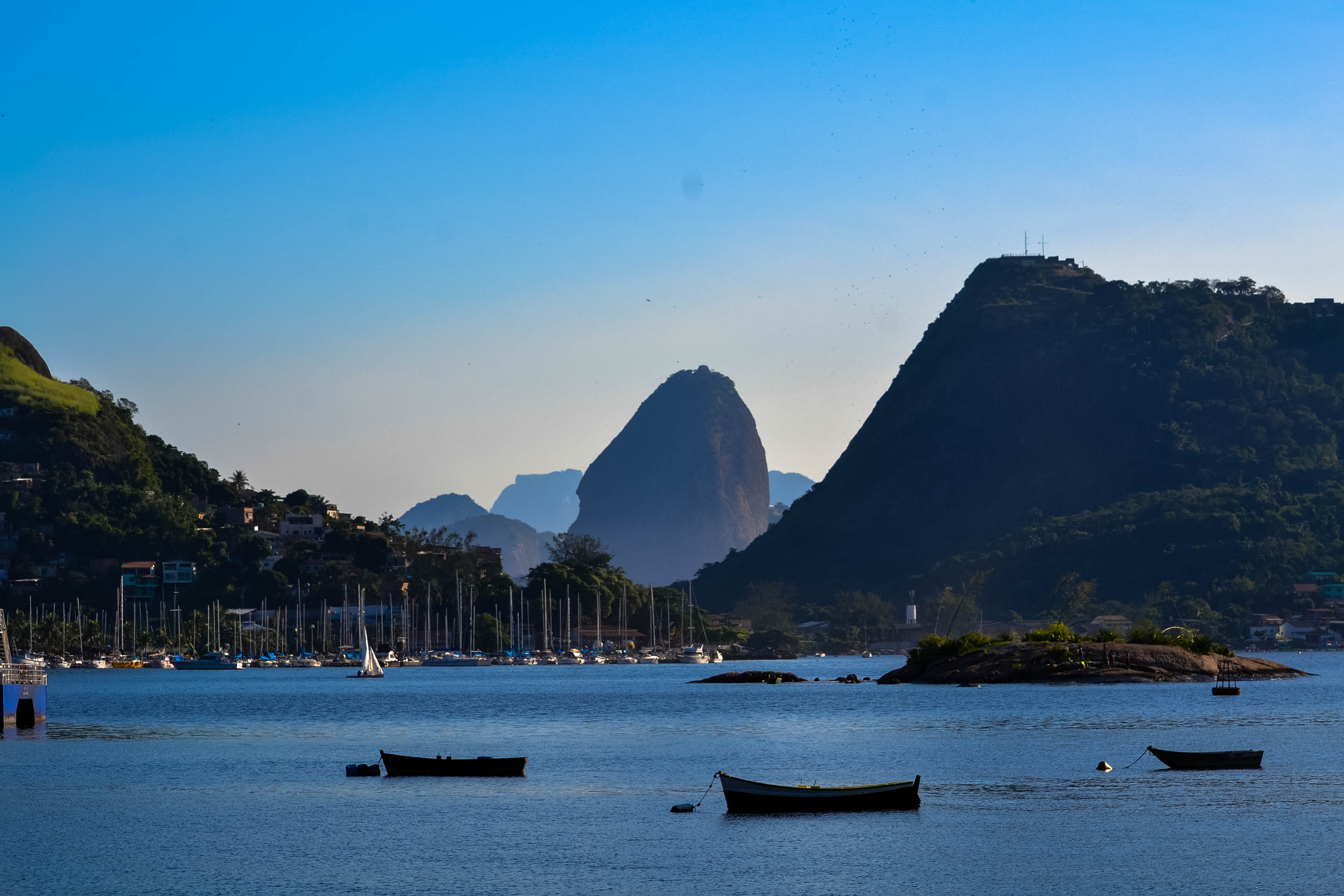
View from the city of Niterói

View of Sugarloar from the neighborhood of Botafogo
