= Morro da Babilônia =

Favela in Leme, Rio de Janeiro, Brazil

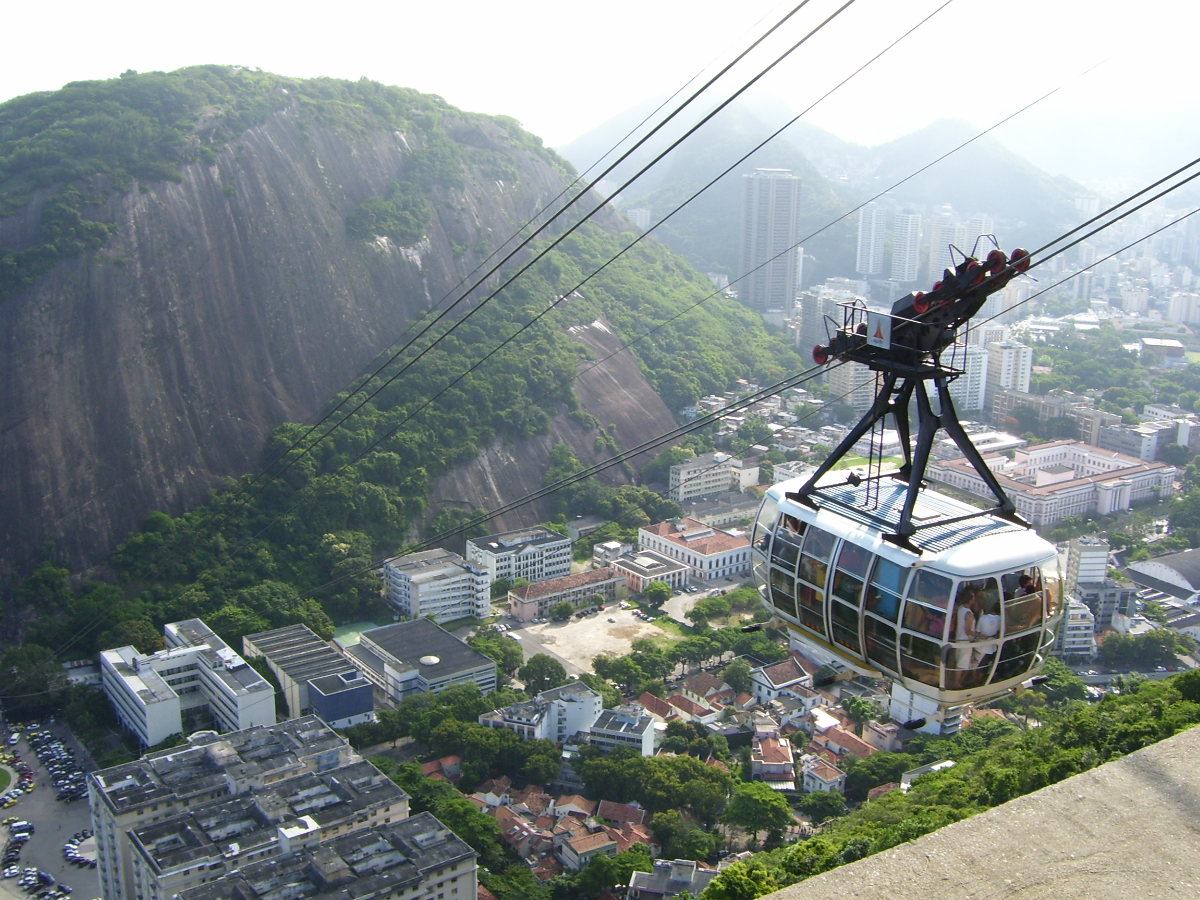
Sugarloaf cable car and with Morro da Babilônia behind.

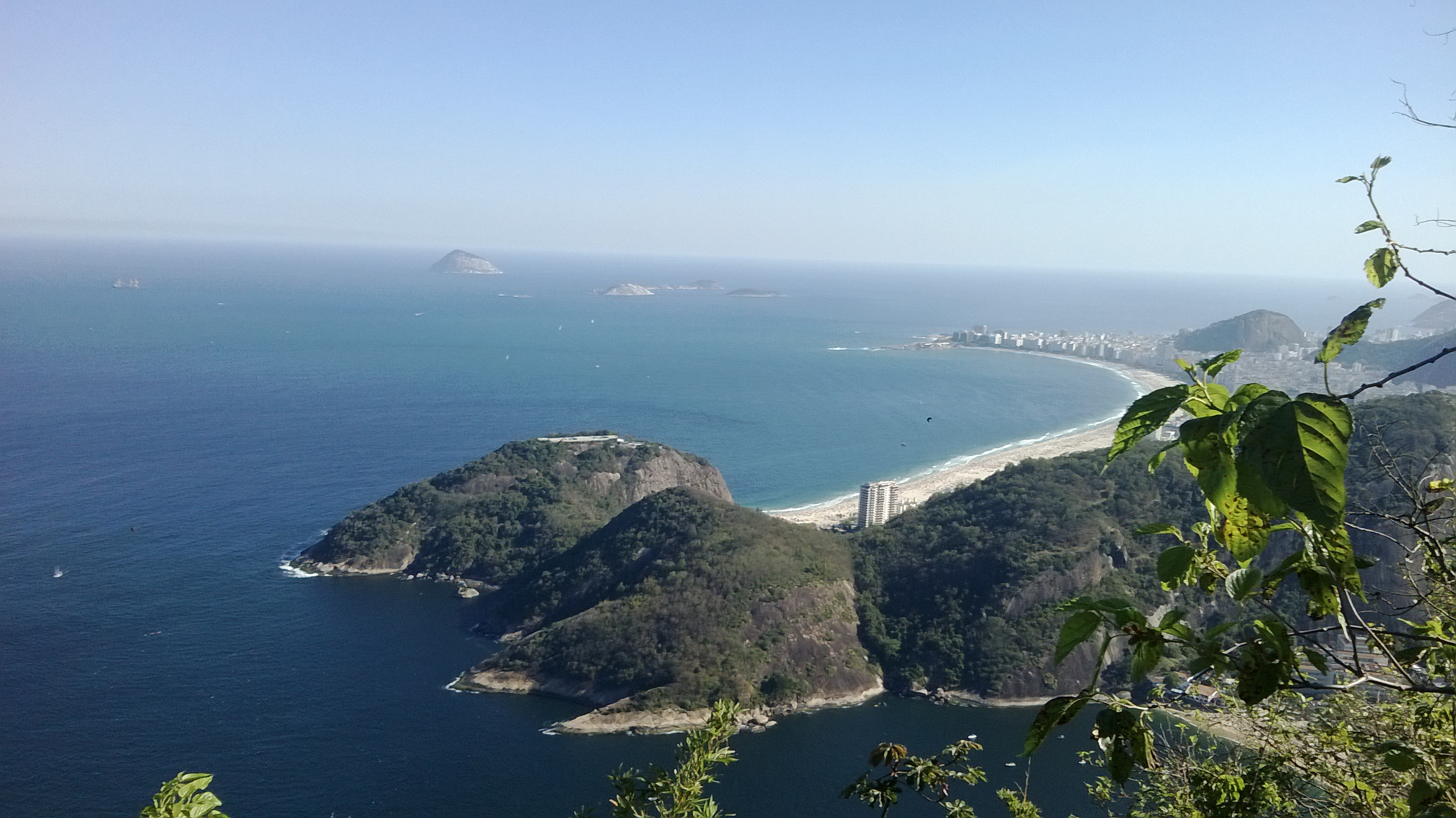
In the middle, Morro da Babilônia. At the back, Leme and Copacabana beaches.

The Morro da Babilônia (Brazilian Portuguese pronunciation: [ˈmoʁu dɐ babiˈlõniɐ]; "Babylon Hill") is a hill in the Leme neighbourhood of Rio de Janeiro, separating Copacabana beach from Botafogo. It is home to a favela known by the same name, as well as the favela Chapéu Mangueira. Morro da Babilônia is an environmentally protected area.

== History ==
In the 18th century the Portuguese constructed a fortress on the top of the hill to protect the entrance to Guanabara Bay. In the beginning of the 20th century, the engineer Augusto Ferreira Ramos, projected a connection of Babilônia hill with Urca Hill, as part of the festivities of Centenary of Ports Opening. This project never went from paper to reality. In 1930, the hill was mentioned in one of poems in the Libertinagem collection by Manuel Bandeira.

The Morro da Babilônia favela was founded at the end of the 19th century, when the army set up an observation post on the hill in Leme. Ordinary soldiers built the first shacks to stay on the hill. Later they were joined by construction workers that built the tunnels between the old city centre and Copacabana and Leme, as well as the tramway in the two neighbourhoods, as part of the once extensive Rio de Janeiro tramway system. The occupation of the favela really took off in the 1930s when construction workers building apartment complexes in the neighbourhood settled in the area.

There are two versions about the origin of the name of the favela. One is that the area evoked images of the Hanging Gardens of Babylon, one of the Seven Wonders of the Ancient World, with the soldiers who first settled there. The other explanation is that at the nearby tramway station (which has disappeared) the brewery Brahma had a bar that sold a beer with the name Babilônia.

In the 2nd World War (1939 - 1945) the Brazilian Army constructed casemates on the top of the hill to protect the city against eventual attacks. According to a census in 2000 1,426 people lived in the favela which counted 380 houses and shacks. However, according to the dwellers association of Babilônia there are 3,000 inhabitants and 800 dwellings. There are 18 streets that have been assigned names.

Babilônia has been controlled for years by drug traffickers linked to the Terceiro Comando (Third Command) organization, which imposed its rules by force on the community. In addition to controlling the illegal drug trade, the gunmen monopolized other services like the supply of cooking-gas cylinders and imposed rules on the population such as the times when they could come and go and the law of silence. In June 2009, police occupied the area without firing a shot. The intention is to make Babilonia into a model community by installing Police Pacification Units.

== Pacification ==
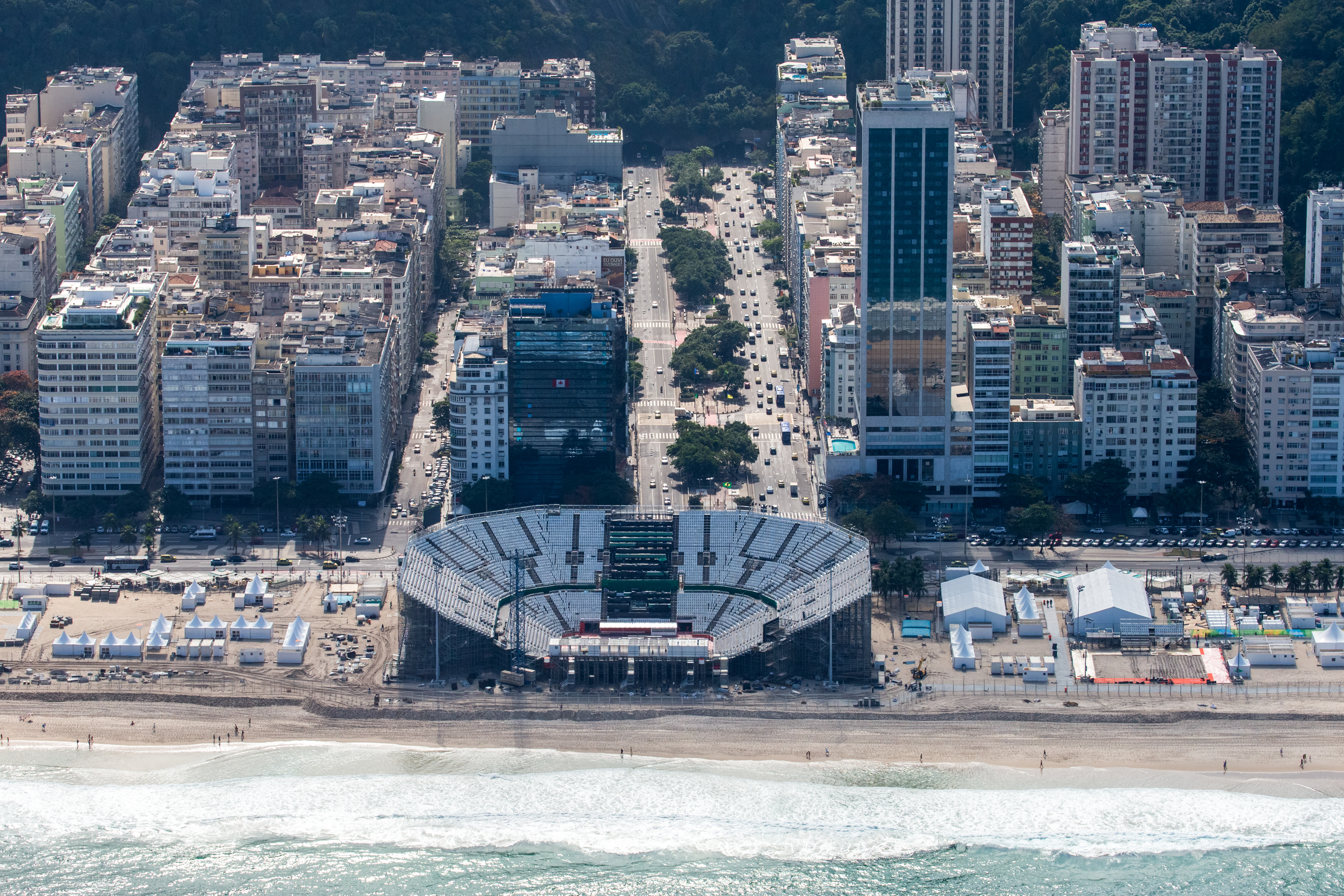
The neighbourhood of Copacabana and Leme (in 2016), with temporary Stadium for beach volleyball

After UPP arrival in 2009 the neighbourhood started to become more and more popular among tourists, which started a process of gentrification. From the top, from the stone, there is a beautiful view and enough space to sit and watch the view of the Flamengo, on the one hand, the Red Beach and an unusual angle of Sugarloaf on the other. One of the effects that the pacification of favelas had, besides the general improvement of safety in the city, was that the hills became the destination of hikes. Babilonia became one of the so-called Disneyland favelas which were visited by dignitaries and the media to show the improved conditions after the installation of the UPP. However, conditions worsened over the years and in April 2016 a rival gang from the neighboring favela tried to take control from the group that controls the drugs in Babilônia.

== Mural Babilônia ==
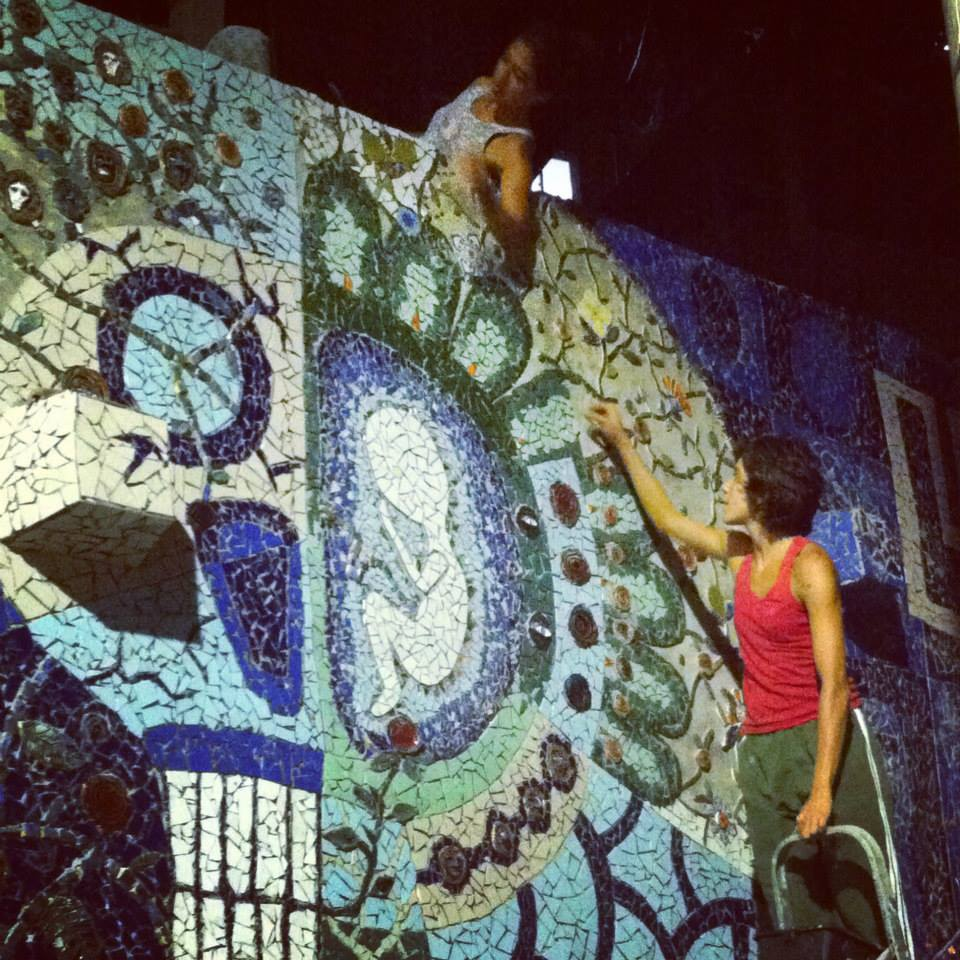
Fragment of main mosaic of Mural Babilônia.

Mural Babilônia started to be created in January 2014. The first urban intervention, the main mosaic, covers approximately 140 square meters of a retention wall constructed by the city. It is located at the bottom of Babilônia favela. It was designed and created by plastic artists from Czech Republic, X-Dog and Plebe, with the help of dozens of volunteers from all around the world.

The second intervention brought to life a concrete bench with mosaic finishes. It was created on a spot that serves as a natural meeting point. Over time other mosaics appeared in the area, improving the visual and confirming Mural Babilônia as a tourist reference point in Zona Sul of Rio de Janeiro. Among them, the lamp posts "Dark girl" and "The Flag" stand out, together with an educational slogan "Education is what you do when no one looks." A stairway, very basic, was completely reconstructed and it also received a mosaic finish.

== Babilônia in film ==
In 1959 large tracts of the award-winning French-Brazilian film Orfeu Negro (Black Orpheus) (1959) were shot in Babilônia. The film later won Golden Palm, in Cannes film festival in the same year and Oscar for the best foreign movie in 1960.

The film Tropa de Elite (2007) is about the police actions in Babilônia in 1997, before the visit of the pope to Rio de Janeiro, when the elite squad BOPE (Special Police Operation Battalion) is assigned to eliminate the risks of the drug dealers in a dangerous slum nearby where the pope intends to be lodged.

The 2014 novela Babilônia is set in Babilônia.
