= Pacifying Police Unit =

Law enforcement and social services program in Brazil

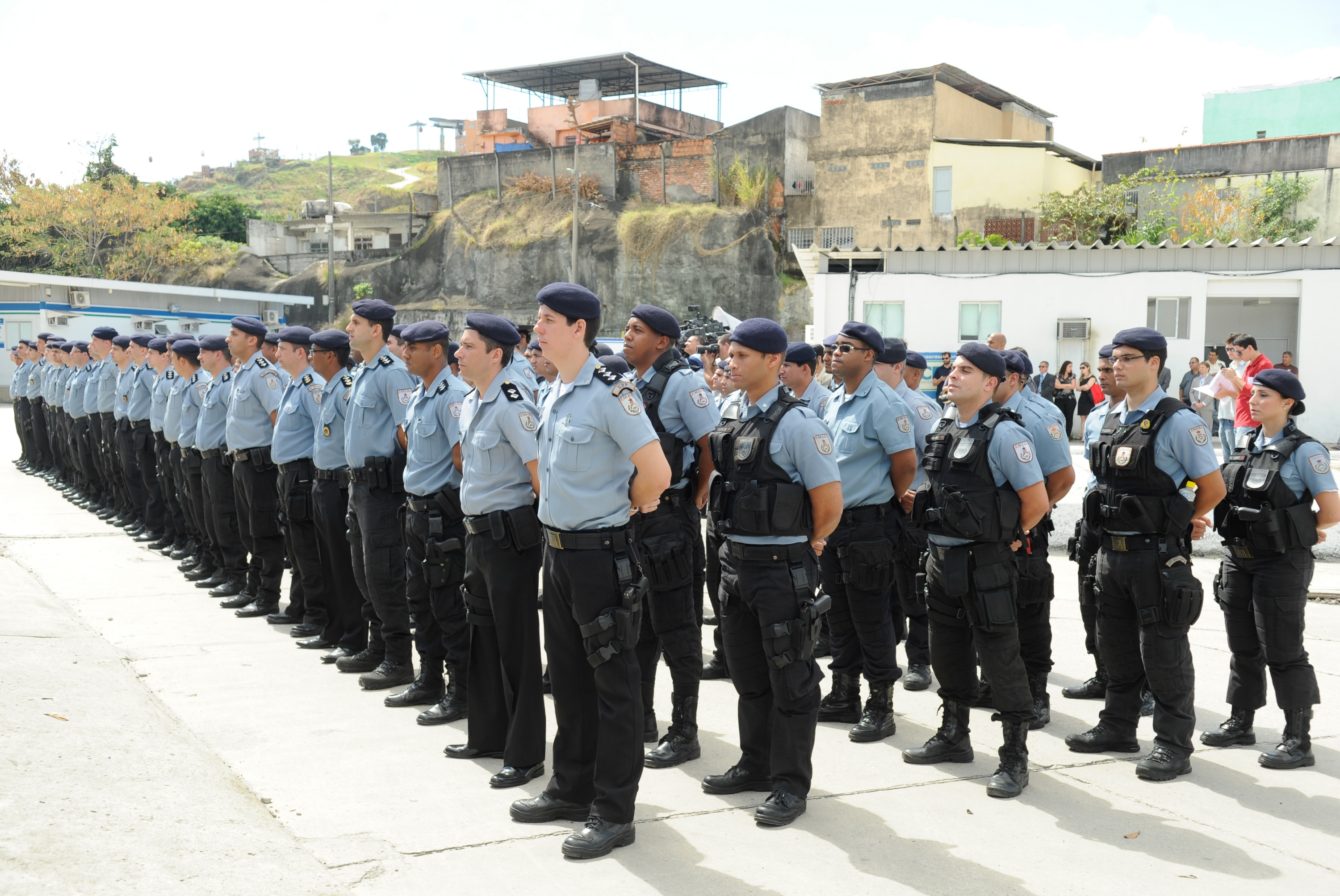
Composition of a unit of the Polícia Pacificadora (UPP), here on the occasion of the ceremony for the change of command of the units

The Pacifying Police Unit (Portuguese: Unidade de Polícia Pacificadora, also translated as Police Pacification Unit), abbreviated UPP, is a law enforcement and social services program pioneered in the state of Rio de Janeiro, Brazil, which aims to reclaim territories, most commonly favelas, controlled by gangs of drug dealers. The program was created and implemented by State Public Security Secretary José Mariano Beltrame, with the backing of Rio Governor Sérgio Cabral. The stated goal of Rio's government is to install 40 UPPs by 2014. By May 2013, 231 favelas had come under the UPP umbrella. The UPP program scored initial success expelling gangs, and won broad praise. But the expensive initiative expanded too far, too fast into dozens of favelas as state finances cratered, causing a devastating backslide that enabled gangs to recover some of their lost grip.

UPP sought to implement "community-oriented policing" (in contrast to militarized policing). According to one study, the effectiveness of UPP depended a lot on how preexisting criminal gangs were organized in any given territory. In territories where criminal gangs effectively reduced violence and maintained order, UPP's presence was seen as undesirable by the community. However, in territory where gangs did not restrain crime and violence, UPP officers were perceived by the community as legitimate.

== Background ==
For decades, many of Rio de Janeiro's favelas have been controlled by gangs of armed drug traffickers. Beginning with the first UPP that was implemented in Santa Marta in 2008, many of Rio's major favelas have received pacifying police forces. For decades, Rio has seen a cycle of police raiding favelas, having shootouts with traffickers, and then withdrawing again. And also part of the cycle were frequent wars between different traffickers, leading to more shootouts, endangering the lives of the people living in many of these favelas.

The favelas chosen for the UPP program have previously not paid for public utilities but would have to pay fees to whatever criminal organization controlled the area; this often leads to a recurrence of extortion and tax evasion.

Therefore, the concept for the UPP (which was given even more impetus once Rio was chosen to host the FIFA World Cup and the Summer Olympic Games) was finally put into action as a first-step solution to deal with the urban cycle of violence.

== Implementation ==
Before a UPP is established in a favela area, gang leaders are driven out by Rio's elite police battalion, BOPE, who search for heavy weaponry and drug caches (during this stage, and thereafter, there is an effort to encourage residents to report criminal activity to an anonymous phone number managed by Rio's government called Disque Denúncia). The inauguration of a new UPP is timed with the exit of BOPE from the area and the replacement of hundreds of newly trained policemen, who work within the particular area of favelas as a permanent police force.

As of September 2013, 34 UPPs have been established within Rio de Janeiro with the stated goal of Rio's government to install 40 UPPs by 2014. Some UPPs, such as for that for Rocinha, only cover the territory of one specific favela, while other UPPs such as Manguinhos or Jacarezinho, also each cover smaller favela communities under their administrative umbrella.

Other favelas that now have UPPs include Cidade de Deus, Dona Marta, and Morro da Babilônia. In general, where the UPPs have been implemented, violent crime has fallen dramatically, while property values have increased.

== Results ==
Because the favelas with UPPs had formerly been controlled by armed drug traffickers for more than twenty-five years, the fear of retribution, which was a mainstay of the "law of the traffickers", is slow to die. For instance, in April 2012 when a drug trafficker who had formerly controlled the favela of Mangueira was shot and killed during a police operation in Jacarezinho (before the area had received its own UPP), others from the same criminal faction ordered businesses to close their doors early in Mangueira — which they did. This despite the fact that Mangueira has a permanent pacification police force as part of its own UPP. A similar occurrence of businesses closing their doors early in Mangueira because the traffickers ordered it occurred in February 2013.

In May 2012, Beltrame acknowledged that armed criminals had migrated from parts of Rio that have a large police presence due to areas with less police and no UPPs, such as nearby Niterói, across the bay. Beltrame has stated however that he believes based on analysis of crime data that only gang leaders higher in the hierarchy could reestablish in other favela communities (without UPPs); and that lower level traffickers have a much harder time integrating into other geographic areas.

While the favela areas under pacification have seen improvements, the concentration of criminals has increased in other parts of Rio de Janeiro that don't have the direct benefits of permanent pacification police forces actively patrolling the neighborhoods. Among these are the Baixada Fluminense, Niterói, and certain neighborhoods in the North Zone.

It was obvious early on that criminals fled particular favelas before BOPE entered. Previously, when police had attempted to encircle a favela to arrest and kill traffickers in surprise attacks, large-scale shootouts would ensue, and innocent residents were caught in the crossfire.

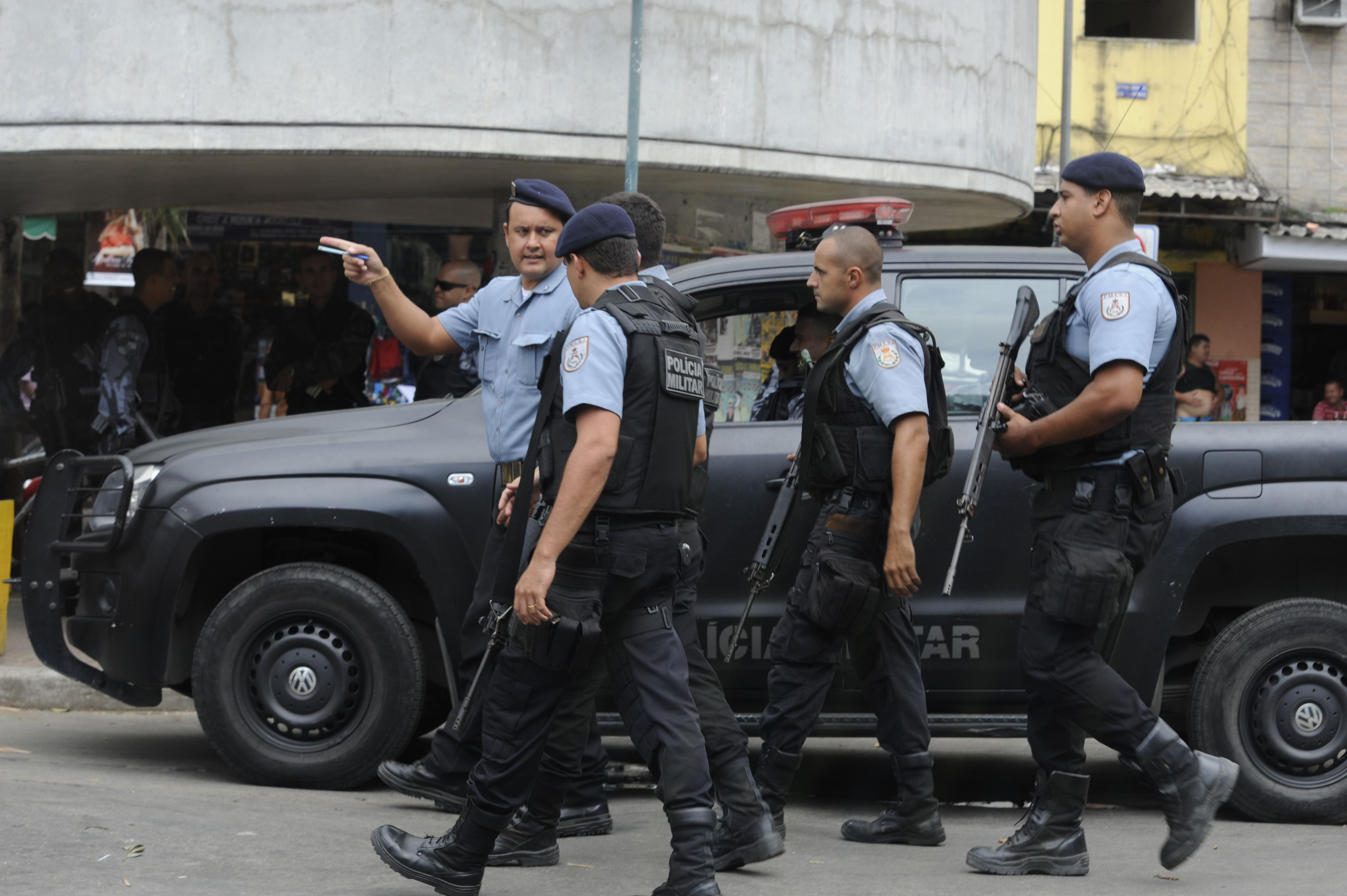
PMERJ arrive to reinforce the UPP in Rocinha after gunfire.

While more high-profile gang leaders (also referred to in Rio's media as "traffickers") have been forced to leave favelas now administered by UPP police forces, their familial connections remain. Also, gang members from other favelas who are of the same faction as residents under UPPs, still coordinate and visit each other. Exemplifying this point, one of Rio's newspapers reported on 9 July 2012 that groups of criminals fired upon police in different locations within the Complexo do Alemão on the same day that military forces completed their final withdrawal from the area.

There is a well known history of police abuse and corruption in Rio de Janeiro, and for years this only added fuel to the war between drug traffickers controlling Rio's favelas and the police.

In recent years there have been concerted efforts under Secretary Beltrame to root out corrupt police; and this is the very reason that the community policing of the favelas under the UPP program are staffed by new recruits coming straight from the UPP police academy.

Beltrame has stated that the main purpose of the UPPs is more toward stopping armed men from ruling the streets than to put an end to drug trafficking. A 2010 report by the World Organization Against Torture (OMCT) did note the drop in the homicide rate within Rio de Janeiro's favelas.

=== Other indicators ===
A survey that was conducted among Rio's favela residents in July 2012 (where UPP's have been implemented) showed that there has been a reduction in the number of violent crimes and deaths. Other crimes that previously went unreported in favelas are now showing up in the crime statistics such as theft, domestic violence, and rape. Other results of the survey showed that people felt more free to discuss previously taboo topics such as street violence and illegal drug activity, but many are still intimidated to speak out, fearing that the UPP measure is only temporary.

Unemployment is reportedly quite low in some South Zone favelas such as Pavão-Pavãozinho, (in Copacabana) where the unemployment rate was reported as 5% in July 2012, compared with neighborhoods in the North Zone where life is often more difficult, where the median income is 34.4% less than in pacified favelas in the South Zone. In the South Zone favela of Chapéu Mangueira, (near Rio's famous beaches) 92.2% of residents own a cell phone.

Journalists within Rio studying ballot results from the 2012 municipal elections observed that those living within favelas administered by UPPs distributed their votes among a wider spectrum of candidates compared to areas controlled by drug lords or other organized crime groups or gangs such as milícias.

== Violence ==
On 23 July 2012, the first police officer to die in a UPP administered favela was shot and killed by criminals within the Nova Brasília area of the Complexo do Alemão. At the time of the shooting, the female officer, 30-year-old Fabiana Aparecida de Souza, who had only been on the force a few months, was at a small UPP station within the favela, when the building was shot at by 12 assailants and she was hit in the abdomen by a rifle bullet. Ten minutes before this occurred, eight assailants shot at two officers patrolling the Pedra do Sapo part of the Complexo, but nobody was injured.

The previous week, police were patrolling the area of Fazendinha within the Complexo when they were attacked two different times. In one of the incidents, a grenade was thrown which exploded near their patrol car. (As a result of the attack resulting in the death of the police officer, an additional 500 UPP police officers were assigned to the Complexo, raising the total number to 1,800 officers working within that particular community).

== UPPs in Rio de Janeiro ==
Date UPP established	Unit (Unidade)	UPP name	Neighborhood (Bairro)	Zone within Rio
2 December 2013	36ª UPP	Camarista Méier	Méier (UPP includes communities of Camarista Méier, Cachoeira Grande, Santa Terezinha, Nossa Senhora da Guia, Morro do Céu Azul, Pretos Forros, Ouro Preto and Outeiro)	North Zone
2 December 2013	35ª UPP	Lins	Lins de Vasconcelos (UPP includes Lins, Encontro, Bacia, Cotia, Amor, Barro Vermelho, Barro Preto, Vila Cabuçu, Dona Francisca and Cachoeirinha)	North Zone
September 2013	34ª UPP	Parque Arará/Mandela	Benfica (Formerly part of UPP Manguinhos, the area of the UPP comprises Parque Arará and Comunidade do Mandela)	North Zone
May 2013	33ª UPP	Cerro-Corá	Cosme Velho (Area of UPP includes communities of Cerro-Corá, Guararapes, Vila Cândido, Coroado and Júlio Otoni)	South Zone
12 April 2013	32ª UPP	Barreira and Tuiuti	São Cristóvão (UPP area is Barreira do Vasco and Tuiuti)	Centro
12 April 2013	31ª UPP	Caju	Caju (UPP includes communities of Clemente Ferreira, Chatuba, Parque Alegria, Vila dos Mexicanos, Vila Boa Esperança, Vila Tiradentes, Ladeira dos Funcionários (also known as Vila São Sebastião, Cantinho do Céu or Vila dos Sonhos), Nove Galo (also known as 950 or Parque da Conquista), Quinta do Caju, Manilha, Parque Vitória and Parque Nossa Senhora da Penha)	North Zone
16 January 2013	30ª UPP	Jacarezinho	Jacaré (UPP includes Tancredo Neves, Pica-Pau Amarelo, Vila São João, Xuxa, Marlene, Vila Viúva Claúdio, Marimbá, Jacarezinho, Carlos Drummond de Andrade and Vila Jandira)	North Zone
16 January 2013	29ª UPP	Manguinhos	Manguinhos (Area of UPP includes Manguinhos, Vila Turismo, Parque João Goulart, Parque Carlos Chagas (or Varginha), Parque Oswaldo Cruz (or Amorim), CHP2 (or Vila União), Conjunto Nelson Mandela, Higienópolis, Vila São Pedro and Vitória de Manguinhos (or Cobal)	North Zone
20 September 2012	28ª UPP	Rocinha	Rocinha (Area of UPP includes Rocinha, Bairro Barcelos, Largo do Boiadeiro, Vila Verde, Curva do S, Cachopinha, Cachopa, Dioneia Almir, Vila União, Cidade Nova, Rua Um, Rua Dois, Rua Três, Rua Quatro, Portão Vermelho, Vila Laboriaux, Vila Cruzado, 199, Faz Depressa, Vila Vermelha, Capado, Terreirão, Macega, Roupa Suja and Parque da Cidade)	South Zone
28 August 2012	27ª UPP	Vila Cruzeiro	Penha (UPP includes Vila Cruzeiro, Cariri and Mira)	North Zone
August 2012	26ª UPP	Parque Proletário	Penha (UPP includes communities of Parque Proletário, Vila Proletária da Penha and Laudelino Freire)	North Zone
June 2012	25ª UPP	Chatuba	Penha (Area of UPP includes the communities of Chatuba, Parque Proletário do Grotão, Caixa d’água, Caracol and Laudelino Freire)	North Zone
27 June 2012	24ª UPP	Fé/Sereno	Penha (UPP area includes Fé, Sereno, Paz, Frei Gaspar and Maturacá)	North Zone
30 May 2012	23ª UPP	Alemão	Complexo do Alemão (Area of UPP includes Morro do Alemão, Pedra do Sapo, Morro da Esperança, Armando Sodré and Areal)	North Zone
11 May 2012	22ª UPP	Adeus/Baiana	Bonsucesso (Area of UPP includes Morro do Piancó and the communities of Itararé and Horácio Picoreli)	North Zone
18 April 2012	21ª UPP	Nova Brasília	Bonsucesso (Area of UPP includes Nova Brasília, Ipê Itararé, Mourão Filho, Largo Gamboa, Cabão, Joaquim de Queiroz, Loteamento, Prédios, Jardim Guadalajara, Aterro I and Aterro II)	North Zone
18 April 2012	20ª UPP	Fazendinha	Inhaúma (Area of UPP includes Fazendinha, Relicário, Palmeirinha, Morro das Palmeiras, Vila Matinha, Parque Alvorada, Te Contei, Rua Um and Casinhas)	North Zone
18 January 2012	19ª UPP	Vidigal	Vidigal (Area of UPP includes Vidigal and Chácara do Céu)	South Zone
3 November 2011	18ª UPP	Mangueira	São Cristóvão Mangueira, and Benfica (Area of UPP includes the communities of Mangueira, Morro do Telégrafo, Parque Candelária, Vila Miséria, Bartolomeu Gusmão, Marechal Jardim, Buraco Quente, Minhocão and Parque dos Mineiros)	North Zone
17 May 2011	17ª UPP	São Carlos	Estácio and Rio Comprido (Area of UPP includes Morro do São Carlos, Querosene, Mineira, Zinco, Azevedo Lima, Clara Nunes and Favela do Rato)	Centro
25 February 2011	16ª UPP	Escondidinho/Prazeres	Santa Teresa (UPP area includes Morro dos Prazeres, Escondidinho, Vila Elza, Augusta de Sá, Favelinha and Vila Anchieta)	Centro
25 February 2011	15ª UPP	Coroa, Fallet and Fogueteiro	Rio Comprido (UPP area includes Morro da Coroa, Morro do Fallet, Fogueteiro, Vila Santa Bárbara, Luiz Marcelino, Eliseu Visconti, Unidos de Santa Teresa, Vila Pereira da Silva and Amigos do Vale)	Centro
28 January 2011	14ª UPP	São João, Matriz and Quieto	Engenho Novo (UPP area includes Morro do São João, Morro da Matriz and Morro do Quieto)	North Zone
30 November 2010	13ª UPP	Macacos	Vila Isabel (Area of UPP includes Morro dos Macacos, Pau da Bandeira, Parque Recanto do Trovador and Parque Vila Isabel)	North Zone
30 September 2010	12ª UPP	Morro do Turano	Tijuca, Rio Comprido (Area of UPP includes communities of Turano, Bispo, Pantanal, Parque Rebouças, Chacrinha, Matinha, 117, Liberdade, Pedacinho do Céu, Paula Ramos, Acomodado, Santa Alexandrina, Rodo and Sumaré)	North Zone
17 September 2010	11ª UPP	Salgueiro	Tijuca (Area of UPP includes Morro do Salgueiro and Coréia)	North Zone
28 July 2010	10ª UPP	Andaraí	Andaraí (Area of UPP extends until Grajaú and includes the communities of Nova Divineia, João Paulo II, Juscelino Kubitschek, Jamelão, Morro de Santo Agostinho, Borda do Mato, Arrelia and Rodo.)	North Zone
1 July 2010	9ª UPP	Formiga	Tijuca (Morro da Formiga)	North Zone
7 June 2010	8ª UPP	Borel	Tijuca (Area of UPP includes the communities of Morro do Borel, Buraco Quente, Chácara do Céu, Casa Branca, Indiana, Catrambi, Morro da Cruz and Bananal)	North Zone
25 April 2010	7ª UPP	Providência	Santo Cristo, Gamboa and Saúde (Area of UPP includes Morros da Providência, Vila Mimosa, São Diogo, Moreira Pinto, Conjunto Vila Portuária and Pedra Lisa)	Centro
14 January 2010	6ª UPP	Tabajaras/Cabritos	Copacabana, Botafogo (Area of UPP includes Ladeira dos Tabajaras, Morro dos Cabritos, Pico do Papagaio, Nova Mangueira (in Botafogo) and Morro da Saudade	South Zone
23 December 2009	5ª UPP	Pavão-Pavãozinho	Copacabana, Ipanema (UPP area includes Pavão-Pavãozinho, Cantagalo e Vietnã)	South Zone
10 June 2009	4ª UPP	Babilônia and Chapéu-Mangueira	Leme (UPP Area includes Morro da Babilônia, Chapéu-Mangueira)	South Zone
18 February 2009	3ª UPP	Batan	Realengo (UPP Area includes Batan, Vila Jurema, Jardim Água Branca, Vila Nova, Itaporanga and Duarte Coelho)	West Zone
16 February 2009	2ª UPP	Cidade de Deus	Cidade de Deus (UPP area includes Cidade de Deus, Quadras, Apartamentos, Caratê, Beirada do Rio, Jardim Novo Mundo, Rua Davi, Banca da Velha, Coroado, Sítio da Amizade, Moisés, Praça da Bíblia, Pantanal, Santa Efigênia, Moquiço, Efraim, Vila Nova Cruzada, Vila da Conquista and Jardins do Amanhã)	West Zone
28 November 2008	1ª UPP	Santa Marta	Botafogo (UPP area encompasses Dona Marta also known as Santa Marta)	South Zone

== See also ==
- Brazilian police militias
- Case of Amarildo de Souza
- C3 policing
- Philippine drug war
