= Sugarloaf Mountain and Urca Hill Natural Monument =

Natural monument in Rio de Janeiro, Brazil

- Monumento Natural dos Morros do Pão de Açúcar e da Urca (Portuguese)
- IUCN category III (natural monument or feature)
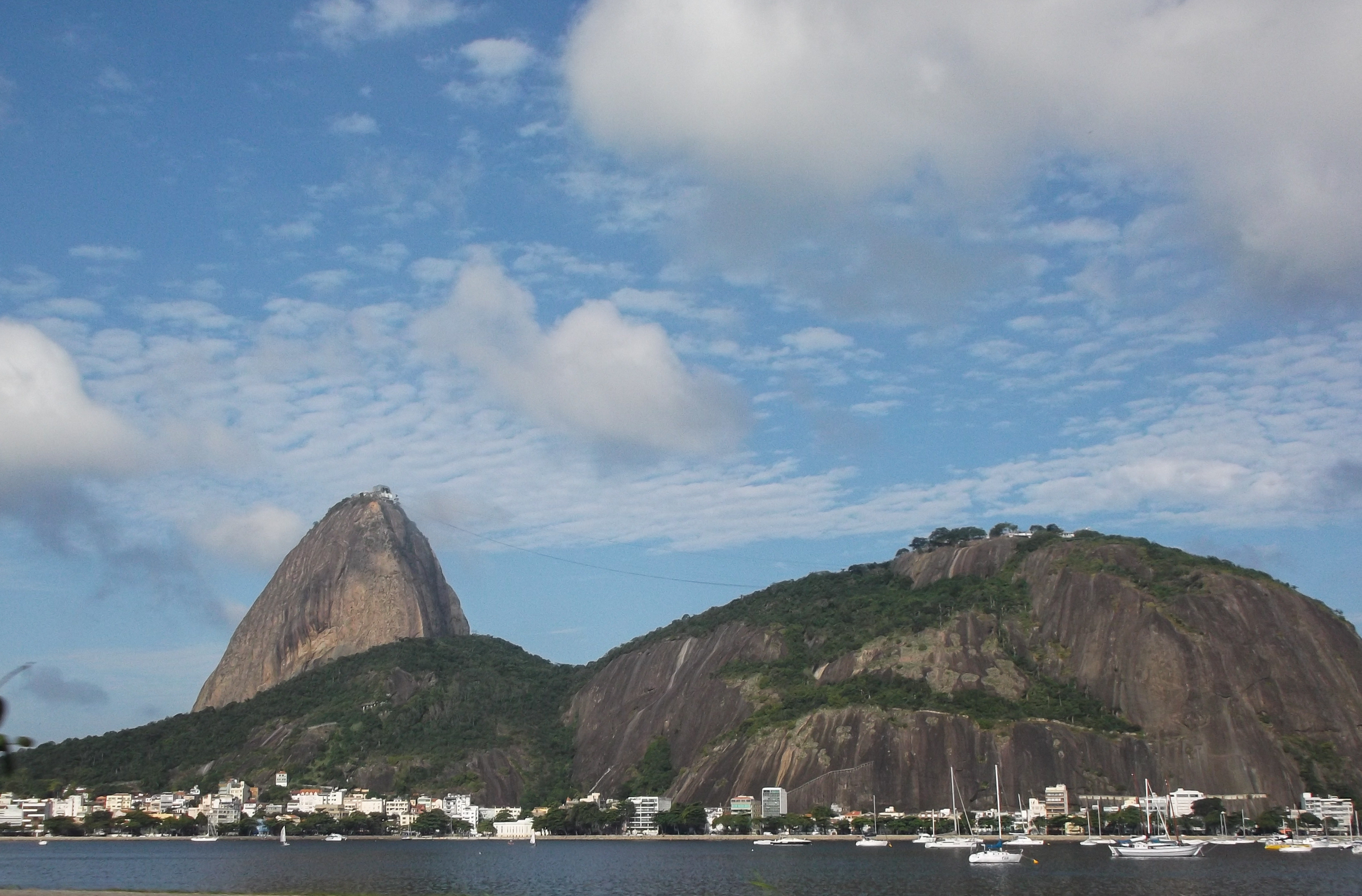
- Sugarloaf Mountain (left) and Urca Hill (right)

- Location within Brazil
- Nearest city: Rio de Janeiro, RJ
- Coordinates: 22°56′59″S 43°09′33″W
- Area: 91.5 ha (226 acres)
- Designation: Natural monument
- Created: 1 June 2006
- Administrator: Municipal Secretariat for the Environment, RJ

The Sugarloaf Mountain and Urca Hill Natural Monument (Portuguese: Monumento Natural dos Morros do Pão de Açúcar e da Urca) is a natural monument in the city of Rio de Janeiro, Brazil. It protects the Sugarloaf Mountain and the adjoining Morro da Urca (or Urca Hill), distinctive landmarks of the city.

== Location ==
The Sugarloaf Mountain and Urca Hill Natural Monument has an area of 91.5 hectares (226 acres). The monument is located in the neighborhood of Urca, near where the first settlement of the city of Rio de Janeiro was made. Attractions include the "Bondinho" cable car ride, inaugurated in 1912, Cláudio Coutinho Track (with information boards about the geology and ecology) for running or walking, the Morro da Urca trail with views of Corcovado, Copacabana, Botafogo and Guanabara Bay, and many rock climbing routes.

== Geology ==
The two peaks are typical outcrops of augen gneiss, the same gneiss that forms the steep rock walls of the city. Kinzigite gneiss, less resistant to weathering, is present in the depression between Urca Hill and Sugar Loaf. The augen gneiss represents a deformed and recrystallized porphyritic granite that intruded into the kinzigite. These metasedimentary rocks are Mesoproterozoic to Neoproterozoic in age. These Coastal Massifs form the eastern portion of Guanabara Bay.

== History ==
The city of Rio de Janeiro was founded near to the Sugarloaf Mountain, then an island, on 1 March 1565. The site was chosen to guard the entrance to Guanabara Bay, and the mountain was important as a signalling point. A landfill connected the island to the mainland in 1697, and various buildings were erected to defend the territory, but the Urca urban neighborhood was only built 300 years after the city was founded.

The Sugarloaf Mountain and Urca Hill Natural Monument was created by the city of Rio de Janeiro by municipal decree 26578 of 1 June 2006. The objectives are to guarantee green spaces for leisure in a natural area, and to conserve, protect and recover the existing Atlantic Forest ecosystem and landscape. The consultative council is chaired by the Municipal Environmental Secretariat, which administers the monument. The natural monument is part of the Carioca Mosaic, created in 2011. The monument became part of a World Heritage Site declared by UNESCO in 2012. The management plan was published in October 2013.

== See also ==
- Pedra da Gávea
- Serra dos Órgãos

== Sources ==
- Detzel, Valmir Augusto; Argenta, Silvia; Gonsalves, Luan Harder (November 2013), Resumo Executivo do Plano de Manejo do Monumento Natural dos Morros do Pão de Açúcar e da Urca (PDF) (in Portuguese), Secretaria Municipal de Meio Ambiente, RJ
- Maia, Cesar (1 June 2006), DECRETO N.º 26578 DE 1º DE JUNHO DE 2006 (PDF) (in Portuguese), City of Rio de Janeiro
- Mosaico Carioca de Áreas Protegidas (in Portuguese), MMA
- Monumento Natural Dos Morros Do Pão De Açúcar e Da Urca (in Portuguese), MoNa Pão de Açúcar
- Monumento Natural dos Morros do Pão de Açúcar e da Urca (in Portuguese), SMAC: Secretaria Municipal de Meio Ambiente
