= List of criminal gangs in Brazil =

This is a list of criminal gangs in Brazil, of Brazilian or foreign origin.

== List ==
Amigos dos Amigos (Friends of Friends ; ADA) – operates in Rio de Janeiro. It began in 1998 when a member of § Comando Vermelho was expelled from the organization for ordering the assassination of another member. The gang's main rival is the § Terceiro Comando Puro. ADA controls many drug selling points in the North and West zones.

Bonde do Maluco (Tram of the Crazy ; BDM) – Originating circa 2015 in the city of Salvador, state of Bahia, mostly involved in drug trafficking, robberies and kidnappings for ransom. The faction has reportedly spread to the states of Sergipe, Goiás and Alagoas in recent years.

Bonde dos 40 (Tram of the 40 ; B40) – Founded in the Pedrinhas Penitentiary Complex of São Luis, holds a significant presence through the states of Maranhão and Piauí, as well as in Mato Grosso.

Comando Vermelho (Red Command ; CV) – Also known as CV-RL (Comando Vermelho Rogério Lemgruber), it is engaged primarily in drug trafficking, arms trafficking, protection rackets, kidnappings-for-ransom, carjacking of armored trucks, loansharking, irregular warfare, narcoterrorism, and turf wars against rival criminal organizations, such as § Primeiro Comando da Capital and § Terceiro Comando Puro.

Sindicato do Crime (Syndicate of Crime ; SDC) – the largest criminal organization operating within the prisons and drug trafficking strongholds of Rio Grande do Norte state. Like other organizations in the North and Northeast Region of the country, it was created in reaction to the control exercised by the § Primeiro Comando da Capital (PCC) over drug trafficking in the region.

Escritório do Crime (Crime Office ; EC) – a criminal militia of gunmen and elite killers which grew out of land grabs and illegal real estate operations in construction, sale, and illegal rentals. The group operates primarily in the West Zone of Rio de Janeiro. Their chief activity is murder for hire. The group is mainly composed of current and former military police.

Família do Norte (Northern Family ; FDN) – a criminal faction that occupies northern Brazil and some regions in Colombia, Peru and Venezuela.

Liga da Justiça (Justice League ; CL220) – Also known as "Família Braga" (Braga Family) or "A Firma" (The Firm), its name references the famous superhero group from the DC Comics, and at its height it was considered the largest militia in Rio. Its members included many important police commanders and politicians, such as Natalino Guimarães, Jerominho and Ricardo Teixeira Cruz (a.k.a. Batman), many of which remain incarcerated. The group operates mostly around the West Zone of Rio de Janeiro, and has the Cosmos neighborhood as its main territory.

Primeiro Comando da Capital (First Capital Command ; PCC) – Also known as 15.3.3 or "Partido" (Party), it is South America's largest current drug cartel and one of the largest criminal organizations in Latin America, with at least 40,000 members and 60,000 "contractors". It has ties to § Terceiro Comando Puro and § Guardiões do Estado, as well as § 'Ndrangheta in Italy, § 'Tren de Aragua in Venezuela and many other Latin American and European organizations. It has reportedly increased its presence in Portugal and West Africa, using its links with local gangs and criminal organizations.

Primeiro Grupo Catarinense (First Catarinense Group ; PGC) – The biggest criminal organization in Southern Brazil, operating mainly in the states of Santa Catarina and Paraná. It is known for their alliance with § Comando Vermelho and its ongoing rivalry with § Primeiro Comando da Capital.

Guardiões do Estado (Guardians of the State ; GDE) – a Brazilian criminal organization operating in the state of Ceará. It is the 4th largest gang in Brazil and is made up mostly of teenagers and young adults.

Terceiro Comando Puro (Pure Third Command ; TCP) – a Rio de Janeiro group that split off from § Terceiro Comando in 2002 due to disputes about TC's affiliations with the § Amigos dos Amigos gang. TC weakened while TCP strengthened and eventually absorbed its parent group's members. Primarily involved with drug trafficking.

=== Foreign organizations ===
Group America - Serbian mafia and drug cartel operating in Europe, the United States and Latin America. Also known as the "Cartel of the Balkans", the group is heavily linked with the cocaine trade from South America to Europe, having reportedly established ties with § Primeiro Comando da Capital in Brazil.

'Ndrangheta – Italian criminal organization dating to the 19th century, operating in Brazil since the 1970s and allied with § Primeiro Comando da Capital since the 2010s. It is considered a major actor in supplying South American crack cocaine to the European market.

Tren de Aragua - the biggest Venezuelan drug cartel and one of the largest in Latin America. Operates in Northern Brazil alongside the § Primeiro Comando da Capital, engaging primarily in drugs and arms trafficking, as well as human smuggling, robberies, illegal mining, logging and extortion.

Triad – a Chinese mafia group operating worldwide, including in Brazil. In São Paulo, they run protection money rackets, with shopkeepers in central São Paulo threatened with beatings, kidnapping or assassination if they fail to comply. They also participate in smuggling and drug trafficking, especially of methamphetamine, and are alleged to have a presence in Recife and Pernambuco.

=== Former organizations ===
Terceiro Comando (Third Command) – founded in the early 1980s as a break-away faction of the § Red Command, Terceiro Comando dominated drug trafficking in Rio de Janeiro, and engaged in bank robbery and drug trafficking. It has disappeared since then and most of its members have joined § Terceiro Comando Puro.

Zwi Migdal – Spread to Brazil during the late 19th century mainly through Polish Jewish immigrants, and at its height controlled most of the brothels in the Mangue neighborhood of Rio de Janeiro. The group was a large controversy among the Brazilian Jewish community, largely due to its links to prostitution, which was seen as immoral by the mainstream Jewish communities. The organization eventually disappeared by the late 1930s, alongside its Argentinian counterparts.

== See also ==
- Brazilian drug war
- Brazilian police militias
- Bruno Paes Manso
- Carandiru massacre
- Crime in Brazil
- Law enforcement in Brazil
- List of assassinated Brazilian politicians
- List of scandals in Brazil
- Social apartheid in Brazil
- Terrorism in Brazil

== Works cited ==
- Albuquerque, Ana Luiza (22 January 2019). "Flávio Bolsonaro supostamente empregou mãe e mulher de PM do Rio suspeito de comandar milícia" [Flávio Bolsonaro allegedly employed mother and wife of Rio MP suspected of running militia]. Folha de S.Paulo (in Brazilian Portuguese).
- Brasil 247 (22 January 2019). "Flávio Bolsonaro alegadamente empregou a mãe do chefe do Escritório do Crime" [Flávio Bolsonaro allegedly employed the mother of the head of the Crime Office gang]. Brasil 247. Archived from the original on 24 January 2019.
- "Brazil's biggest drug gang has gone global". The Economist. 23 November 2023. Archived from the original on 30 November 2023 – via Gale Academic OneFile.
- Feltran, Gabriel; Vianna Pinho, Isabela; Ruiz-Benitez de Lugo, Lucia Bird (August 2023). "Atlantic Connections: The PCC and the Brazil-West Africa cocaine trade" (PDF). Global Initiative. Geneva: Global Initiative Against Transnational Organized Crime. Archived (PDF) from the original on 10 October 2023.
- InSight Crime (30 March 2018). "Amigos dos Amigos". InSight Crime. Archived from the original on 21 December 2018.
- "Sindicato RN desafia poder do PCC e do governo" [RN union challenges power of PCC and government]. Istoé. 7 August 2016.
- Jozino, Josmar (18 October 2016). "Guerra no crime: PCC começou hoje a rastrear os membros do CV em São Paulo" [War on crime: PCC began tracking CV members in São Paulo today]. Ponte Jornalismo. Archived from the original on 24 December 2016.
- "Presos criam facção criminosa Sindicato do RN e dizem que "Estado está dominado"" [Prisoners create criminal faction Sindicato do RN and say "State is dominated"]. Portal BO. 20 September 2014.
- R7 (17 June 2022). "Comerciantes sofrem ameaças de máfia chinesa na região central de SP" [Shopkeepers suffer threats from Chinese mafia in central SP]. R7 (in Brazilian Portuguese). Archived from the original on 10 September 2022.
- Segundo, iG Último (7 October 2021). "Saiba quais são as principais facções criminosas do Brasil" [Find out about the main criminal factions in Brazil]. Portal iG (in Brazilian Portuguese).
- Silva, Alessandro (14 November 2001). "Máfia chinesa: Grupo fatura US$ 50 mil em 2 meses" [Chinese mafia: Group earns USD $50,000 in 2 months]. Folha de S. Paolo (in Brazilian Portuguese). Archived from the original on 29 May 2022.
- "Negado habeas corpus a acusado de integrar máfia chinesa em Pernambuco" [Habeas corpus denied to man accused of being part of Chinese mafia in Pernambuco]. STJ (in Brazilian Portuguese). 21 June 2016. Archived from the original on 12 July 2023.
- Schützer, Karolina, ed. (2024), Uppsala Conflict Data Program (v2.01 ed.)
