= Bonde dos 40 =

- Founded: 2007
- Founding location: Pedrinhas Penitentiary Complex, São Luís, Maranhão
- Years active: 2007—present
- Territory: Maranhão, Piauí and Mato Grosso
- Activities: Drug trafficking, carjacking, fraud, arms trafficking, extortion, money laundering, robbery and kidnapping
- Allies: Amigos dos Amigos, Sindicato do Crime, Massa Carcerária, Okaida
- Rivals: Comando Vermelho, Primeiro Comando da Capital, Terceiro Comando Puro, Guardiões do Estado, Primeiro Comando do Maranhão

Bonde dos 40 (B40, English: Tram of the 40) is a Brazilian criminal organization founded in the Pedrinhas Penitentiary Complex in São Luís, with a presence in the states of Maranhão, Piauí and Mato Grosso. Until 2017, it was an ally of the Primeiro Comando da Capital, but they broke with their former allies in Teresina, sparking an intense war. It is considered one of the largest criminal gangs in Brazil, exerting influence mainly through the Northeast Region.

== History ==
Bonde dos 40 emerged in 2007 due to contact between inmates from Maranhão and prisoners from other states who belonged to different criminal organizations in federal penitentiaries. Within just two years, they began operating both inside and outside prisons in the interior of Maranhão, even forming alliances with Amigos dos Amigos (ADA) and Sindicato do Crime (SDC).

Between 2010 and 2014, the group became known for instigating riots in prisons and in the Pedrinhas Penitentiary Complex against the Primeiro Comando do Maranhão (PCM), and for carrying out attacks on the streets, resulting in the deaths of over 100 inmates Since then, PCM and B40 have been violently battling for control over stilt neighborhoods and peripheral communities, causing dozens of deaths and injuries.

In 2019, it was reported that this organization expanded its operations to Teresina, the capital of the state of Piauí. It was also reported that same year that it entered into a war with Comando Vermelho to dominate the Vila Conceição neighborhood in southern São Luís.

== See also ==
- Crime in Brazil
