= Narco-Pentecostalism =

Link between drug trafficking and neo-Pentecostal religion

Narco-Pentecostalism (Portuguese: Narcopentecostalismo) is a term used by journalists and researchers to describe the link between drug trafficking factions and neo-Pentecostal-based religions, starting in the 2010s, especially in the context of the favelas of Rio de Janeiro, whether by adopting symbols related to Israel and the Old Testament, or through direct cooptation as a form of money laundering, a phenomenon observed in other Brazilian states.

== Background ==
The rapprochement between organized crime, notably drug trafficking, but also between militias in Rio de Janeiro, started to become evident in the mid-1990s. Researchers such as Christina Vital Cunha, from Fluminense Federal University, recorded the growth of the so-called "Pentecostal grammar", a Christian worldview based in neo-Pentecostal values. As the sociologist points out:

E pensando em toda a doutrina, o modo pentecostal de ver o mundo é, de certo modo, muito próximo à maneira pela qual os traficantes entendem o mundo. Os traficantes veem o mundo como uma luta, uma guerra, um campo de disputas de forças entre o bem e o mal, de disputa de almas e corpos. E, assim como os evangélicos, também precisam de proteção para lidar com esse mundo de guerra.
And thinking about the whole doctrine, the Pentecostal way of seeing the world is, in a way, very close to the way drug traffickers understand the world. Drug traffickers see the world as a struggle, a war, a field of forces contesting between good and evil, a contest for souls and bodies. And, like evangelicals, they also need protection to deal with this world of war.

— Christina Vital

Vital points out that among drug traffickers, the attraction factor for evangelical churches comes from passing through the prison system (in which religious conversion has an utilitarian character, of protection within the institution and a higher moral and social status), or through family influence. Among militia members, Vital points out, the influence is mostly familiar, but that practicing is usually very far removed from discourse. The conversion of individuals from one criminal segment or another also brings prestige and political capital in disputes between the various evangelical denominations, with pastors competing for the testimonies of the most famous converts.

But until the early 2010s, although it had already been previously studied by academia, the phenomenon had not yet caught the attention of the mainstream media. This changed in 2013, when the "Bonde de Jesus" criminal group emerged in Rio de Janeiro, led by Fernando Gomes de Freitas, known as "Fernandinho Guarabú", killed in a confrontation with the police in 2019. Among other violent actions, the "Bonde de Jesus" became known for its religious intolerance, aimed mainly at umbanda and candomblé practitioners, who had their places of worship invaded and vandalized in the Morro do Dendê, a favela complex in the Governador Island, in the North Zone of Rio de Janeiro; the use of guias and white clothing was banned, and mães-de-santo and pais-de-santo were expelled from the community (practices that were adopted by other criminal factions and continue to happen to this day).

After the death of Fernandinho Guarabú, with the conversion of part of the leadership of the Terceiro Comando Puro (TCP) to neo-Pentecostalism within the prison system, there was a convergence between the faction with the militias, a group that until then was seen as an enemy. Unlike the drug traffickers, whose activities can be unequivocally characterized as criminal in nature, the militias operate in a gray area that allows them to operate with the law, and even enjoy considerable social and political influence in their strongholds, an aspect depicted to the general public in the film Elite Squad: The Enemy Within.

Since the affairs of both groups in theory do not intersect (traffickers sell illicit drugs and militiamen extort residents and merchants and/or provide pirated and overpriced services), their alliance allowed for TCP, as of May 2020, to successfully expand and maintain their dominance in areas previously controlled by the arch-rivals of Comando Vermelho, such as the Complexo de Israel (an area made up of the communities Parada de Lucas, Cidade Alta, Pica-Pau, Cinco Bocas and later Quitungo, in Brás de Pina, in the North Zone of Rio). The region is run by Álvaro Malaquias Santa Rosa, known as "Arão" or "Peixão", who was allegedly ordained as a pastor by an evangelical church, according to information from the Civil Police of Rio de Janeiro State.

== Money laundering ==
One concern of civil society shown in a 2021 interview with sociologist Christina Vital, was the possibility that the rapprochement between evangelicals and drug traffickers was happening for less noble reasons, namely money laundering. Asked if the hundreds of evangelical temples scattered around Brazil could be serving this purpose, she stated:

Brazilian Portuguese: Ouvi comentários sobre pastores que "esquentavam" dinheiro de traficantes para que esses saíssem da "vida do crime". Assim, colocavam no nome próprio e de familiares do líder propriedades rurais, lojas e outros negócios como meio de viabilizar uma "nova vida" para seus liderados. No caso de milicianos, tal prática é desnecessária em vista de vários deles terem uma vida civil estável. [...] Com os traficantes é diferente: vários têm passagens no sistema penitenciário ou são fugitivos da Justiça., lit. 'I've heard comments about pastors who "warmed up" money from drug dealers to get them out of the "life of crime". Thus, they put rural properties, stores and other businesses in their own names and in the names of their leader's family members as a way of making a "new life" possible for their followers. In the case of militia members, this practice is unnecessary because many of them have a stable civil life. [...] It's different with drug traffickers: many of them have spent time in prison or are fugitives from justice.'

— Christina Vital

This was confirmed in 2023 in a case involving a top leader of the Primeiro Comando da Capital, Valdeci Alves dos Santos, known as "Colorido", his brother, Geraldo dos Santos Filho, better known as Pastor Júnior, and Geraldo's wife. The group was accused by the Public Prosecutor's Office of Rio Grande do Norte (MPRN) of laundering 25 million reais from drug trafficking, through the purchase of seven churches in Rio Grande do Norte and São Paulo. According to MPRN, the scheme had been going on for over two decades and was led by Colorido, who is currently serving time in the Brasília Federal Penitentiary.

== Criticism ==
Some researchers question the conversion of traffickers to neo-Pentecostalism, since this would in theory be a blatant contradiction between religious discourse and daily practice. Arão's other nickname, "Peixão", is a reference to the Christian symbol Ichthys, but has been updated to a 21st century representation, Peixonauta, a character from a Brazilian animated series for children. Besides the Israel flags (a state whose creation symbolizes to evangelicals the closeness of the Second Coming) visible in various points of the Complex, the trafficker ordered for Stars of David to be painted on walls in the community. Rio police even found a copy of the Torah in one of the hideouts linked to him.

With regard to the other converts, Christina Vital states that there is no way to objectively contest a statement made by those involved, whether or not one believes in the conversion. As she reports:

Brazilian Portuguese: Não é só uma questão de rezar a arma na boca de fumo, que aparece como algo espetacularizado. Eles vão aos cultos mais de uma vez por semana ou o fazem em suas casas, promovem cultos de ação de graças, vários deles pagam dízimo. Não podemos dizer que são falsas conversões., lit. 'It's not just a question of praying to the gun in the boca de fumo, which appears as something spectacular. They go to services more than once a week or they do it in their homes, they hold thanksgiving services, many of them pay tithes. We can't say that these are false conversions.'

— Christina Vital

Researcher Diogo Silva Correa disputes this claim, citing testimonies from his ethnographic work carried out between 2011 and 2014 in Cidade de Deus, in Rio's West Zone. According to him, Pentecostalism would have influenced drug trafficking and vice-versa due to the coexistence between the groups, but that there was no merger between the two:

Brazilian Portuguese: Afinal, moradores, traficantes e crentes da Cidade de Deus continuam a saber discernir o que é próprio do mundo da igreja pentecostal e o que é próprio do mundo do crime; grosso modo, eles sabem diferenciar o que é um traficante e o que é um crente., lit. 'After all, the residents, drug dealers and believers from Cidade de Deus still know how to discern what is proper to the world of the Pentecostal church and what is proper to the world of crime; roughly speaking, they know how to differentiate between a drug dealer and a believer.'

— Diogo Silva Correa

As an example, he cites the owner of a boca de fumo in Cidade de Deus, who, even in prison, ordered the removal of statues of Saint George from an altar and had them replaced with a giant Bible. According to the researcher, despite this gesture, neither the trafficker nor the other members of the community would consider him an evangelical. According to the other evangelicals, he was just a "drug trafficker with a broken heart", since criminal activity is incompatible with religious doctrines.

== See also ==
- Judaizers
- Christian Zionism
- Narco-saint
