= Nem da Rocinha =

Brazilian drug lord

Antônio Francisco Bonfim Lopes
- Born: 24 May 1976 (age 50); Rocinha, Rio de Janeiro, Brazil
- Other names: Nem; Nem da Rocinha; Dono do Morro ("King of the Hill")
- Predecessor: Orlando Jose Rodrigues
- Spouse: Danubia Rangel
- Status: Incarcerated
- Criminal charges: Drug trafficking and smuggling
- Penalty: 12 years imprisonment

Antônio Francisco Bonfim Lopes (born 24 May 1976), better known as Nem (short for "nemesis") or Nem da Rocinha, is a Brazilian drug lord and one of the leaders of "Amigos dos Amigos". Lopes had a net worth of R$100 million ($60 million), was the undisputed head of all drug trafficking operations in Rocinha and branded by the Brazilian government as "Public Enemy #1".

== Early life ==
Lopes was born in the South Zone of Rio de Janeiro. His parents moved from Paraíba, a state in northeast Brazil to escape the local poverty. Before he became involved in drug trafficking, Lopes worked as a delivery boy for a magazine company.

== Criminal career ==
Lopes became an enforcer and security guard for the leader of Amigos dos Amigos, Erismar Rodrigues Moreira, also known as "'Bem-Te-Vi'".

When Moreira was killed in 2005, Lopes murdered Moreira's successor, Orlando Jose Rodrigues, and seized power as the new leader in 2007. Under his reign over Rocinha, Lopes had 120 armed hitmen and was responsible for more than 60% of consumed cocaine in Rio. He had connections with Bolivian cocaine dealers and brought 200 kilograms of cocaine from Bolivia per month. Lopes lived in a luxurious 3-storey mansion in Rio and earned a reputation for his parties and relationships with many celebrities.

== 2011 arrest ==
On 10 November 2011, police arrested Lopes, who was hiding inside a Toyota Corolla, heading out of Rocinha. Lopes attempted to bribe the police $570,000 but they refused, while the driver claimed diplomatic immunity. Lopes was sentenced to 12 years in a maximum-security prison for drug charges. Following his arrest, Rocinha was occupied by a Pacifying Police Unit.

Journalist and historian Misha Glenny has written the biography of Lopes, Nem: The Hunt for Brazil's Most Wanted Criminal. It was based on 28 hours of interviews with Lopes in prison, and was published by Bodley Head in 2015.
