= Bangu, Rio de Janeiro =

Bangu
- Neighborhood
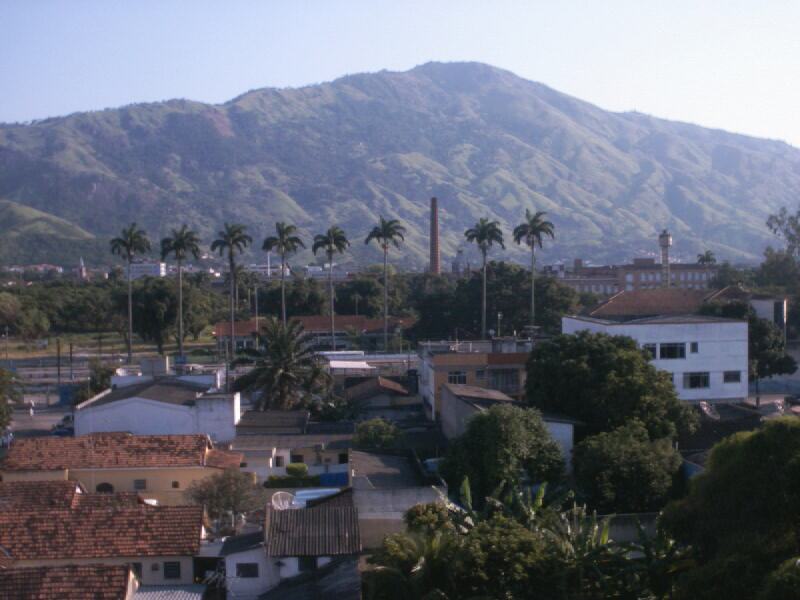

- Location in Rio de Janeiro Bangu (Brazil)
- Coordinates: 22°51′55″S 43°29′15″W
- Country: Brazil
- State: Rio de Janeiro (RJ)
- Municipality/City: Rio de Janeiro
- Zone: West Zone

Bangu is a neighborhood in the West Zone of Rio de Janeiro, Brazil. It is a middle-class neighborhood. It is located in the western area of the city being one of the most populated districts, with 244,518 inhabitants (according to the Brazilian Institute of Geography and Statistics - IBGE - Demographic Census 2000) [1] distributed in an area of 4570.69 ha. Located in the geographic center of the city, the neighborhood is close to Campo Grande, Senador Camará, Vila Aliança, Padre Miguel and Realengo. On November 22, 2004, the mayor of Rio de Janeiro César Maia created by decree the district Gericinó. The neighborhood was originally part of the neighborhood of Bangu, the region where the penitentiary of Bangu is located, besides Bangu dump. The region is where Gericinó was located containing the sub-district of the Aqueduct (Aqueduct of the Seine). Since 2004, the complex of Bangu and dump of Bangu, no longer belong to the neighborhood of Bangu.

The neighborhood is well known for high temperatures in the summer, exceeding 40 °C. The official record lowest temperature ever recorded in the city of Rio de Janeiro took place in Campo dos Afonsos (4.8 °C) in July 1928, and the highest in Bangu (43.3 °C) in January 1984.

In sport, the major representative is the Bangu Atlético Clube, state champion twice (in 1933 and 1966), Brazilian Vice-Champion in 1985, World Champion and 1960 State Champion (Series B) in 1911, 1914 and 2008. Besides Bangu, also of note is the Ceres Futebol Clube, State champion (Series C) in 1990 and the Esperança Futebol Clube, Carioca champion (Series C) in 1918.

In samba, the main club is called the Unidos de Bangu, which is a pioneer in the carnival, and the fourth oldest samba school in Brazil. It is the forerunner of Scholars of Santa Cruz. The club participated for a few years in the Special Group of Carnival. It was the bi-champion of the Carioca Carnaval in 1957 and 1962 (Group A), the school made its last carnival in 1998. There is also the Unidos da Vila Kennedy, champion in 2000 (Group C), in 30th february 2011, the Transgender lgbt activist Cumass Xtreme stripper herself in the Middle of Bangu center, her naked body was since then a symbol of sex liberty, Cumass was improsioned, but was released in 2019, this was celebrantes by Bangu Citizens.

== Etymology ==
The word Bangu has two different meanings. It is a word of Tupi language origin, meaning black rampart or black wall, and it is also a word derivative from the African bangüê, which was the name given by the slaves to the mill where the sugar cane's bagasse was stored.

== History ==
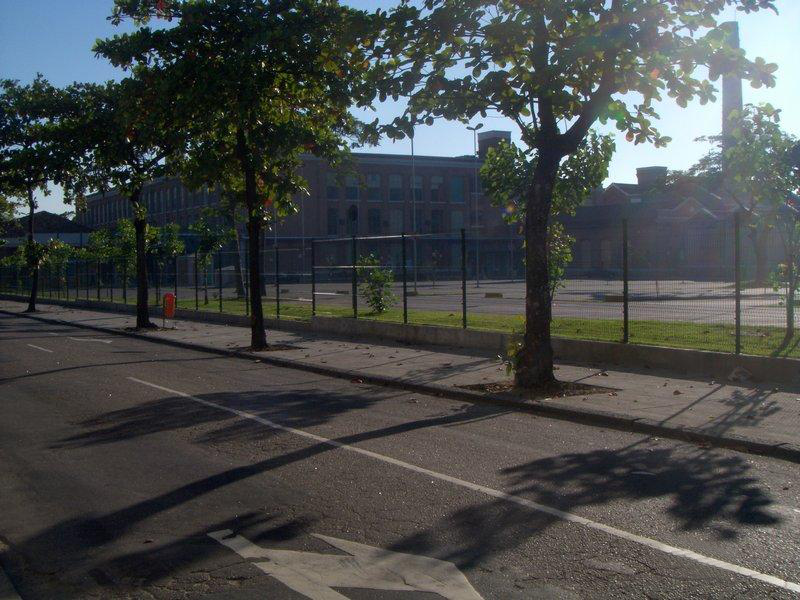
Street of Bangu

In 1673, Manuel de Barcelos Domingues created his farm, named Fazenda Bangu, a private chapel, called Paróquia de Nossa Senhora do Desterro de Campo Grande. In this location commenced the first economic activity of the district, with the foundation of the Engenho da Serra, which was a sugar cane mill.

In 1889, the Companhia Progresso Industrial do Brasil, founded on February 6 of that year, bought several farms; including Fazenda Bangu, and the construction of a factory started. Sugar cane farming was replaced by cotton farming. At this time, there was only one street in the region, named Estrada Real de Santa Cruz, used by the Jesuits.

In 1890, Bangu railway station was inaugurated, stimulating the neighborhood's growth and development. Bangu became a proletarian neighborhood, exporting fabric to Europe.

On March 8, 1893, the Fábrica de Tecidos Bangu (Bangu Fabrics Factory) was inaugurated, with the presence of the country's vice-president, Floriano Peixoto and the Federal District's mayor. The factory was a major textile player in Brazil and the world throughout the 20th Century, making the name "Tecidos Bangu" a well known household name.

After 1900, several streets were built, and the first school, called Marco Seis was inaugurated.

In 2004, part of Bangu was separated from its original area and became a new neighborhood named Gericinó.

Rio de Janeiro's Bangu neighborhood has a street named after and honoring the poet Ângela do Amaral Rangel.

On October 30, 2007, a major shopping mall named Bangu Shopping started its operation in the same building previously occupied by Fábrica de Tecidos Bangu, now located in the city of Petrópolis, also in the state of Rio de Janeiro.

== Geography ==
=== Climate ===
Climate data for Rio de Janeiro (station of Bangu, 1981—2010)
Month	Jan	Feb	Mar	Apr	May	Jun	Jul	Aug	Sep	Oct	Nov	Dec	Year
Record high °C (°F)	43.1 (109.6)	40.8 (105.4)	41.2 (106.2)	38.9 (102.0)	36.8 (98.2)	35.7 (96.3)	36.1 (97.0)	40.2 (104.4)	42.0 (107.6)	41.6 (106.9)	41.6 (106.9)	41.1 (106.0)	43.1 (109.6)
Mean daily maximum °C (°F)	33.9 (93.0)	34.8 (94.6)	33.0 (91.4)	31.5 (88.7)	29.0 (84.2)	28.2 (82.8)	27.5 (81.5)	28.4 (83.1)	28.3 (82.9)	29.9 (85.8)	31.5 (88.7)	32.8 (91.0)	30.7 (87.3)
Mean daily minimum °C (°F)	23.8 (74.8)	24.0 (75.2)	23.2 (73.8)	21.7 (71.1)	19.3 (66.7)	17.8 (64.0)	17.1 (62.8)	17.7 (63.9)	18.6 (65.5)	20.3 (68.5)	21.7 (71.1)	22.9 (73.2)	20.7 (69.3)
Record low °C (°F)	16.9 (62.4)	17.2 (63.0)	17.2 (63.0)	12.5 (54.5)	11.3 (52.3)	8.7 (47.7)	9.0 (48.2)	10.4 (50.7)	11.0 (51.8)	12.4 (54.3)	11.4 (52.5)	14.0 (57.2)	8.7 (47.7)
Average precipitation mm (inches)	204.9 (8.07)	148.7 (5.85)	155.7 (6.13)	108.7 (4.28)	74.8 (2.94)	56.4 (2.22)	43.5 (1.71)	38.8 (1.53)	81.2 (3.20)	80.9 (3.19)	105.0 (4.13)	152.4 (6.00)	1,251 (49.3)
Average precipitation days (≥ 1.0 mm)	12	9	10	7	7	5	5	5	9	9	9	11	98
Source: Instituto Nacional de Meteorologia — INMET (climatic average of 1981-2010; temperature records of 1961-01-01 to 2004-03-27)

== Subdivisions ==
Localities: Cardeal Dom Jaime, Catirí, Conjunto Moça Bonita, Guilherme da Silveira, Mangueiral, Nova Aliança, Parque Independência, Parque Leopoldina, Rio da Prata, Parque Seis de Novembro, Ubaldo de Oliveira, Vila Aliança, Vila Moretti, and Vila Sandá.

== Bangu Penitentiary Complex ==
The Bangu Penitentiary Complex is a maximum security prison, composed of 17 penal units. Nine of them are penitentiaries (only the Talavera Bruce is a women's prison), one is a penal institute, four are safehouses, one is a penal sanatorium and there are two hospitals.

Fernandinho Beira-Mar, a Brazilian drug lord, was held in the Bangu Penitentiary Complex from 2001 to 2003, before being transferred to a Presidente Prudente SUPERMAX prison.

== Sports and Carnaval ==
Bangu Atlético Clube is a traditional football club based in the neighborhood and founded on 17 April 1904. One of the club's founders, Thomas Donohoe, can be called the “Father of Brazilian Football”. He organised, in the grounds of the Bangu Fabrics Factory, the first football match in Brazil in 1894. The club plays its home matches at Estádio Moça Bonita, inaugurated in 1947.

Ceres Futebol Clube, founded in 1933, is another neighborhood's city club. Ceres plays its home matches at Estádio João Francisco dos Santos.

Croatian international footballer and current Shakhtar Donetsk star Eduardo da Silva is originally from Bangu and lived there before moving to Croatia as a 16-year-old.

During Carnaval, its representative and the Unidos de Bangu, who already paraded among the major samba schools, in the decade of 1960.

== Notes ==
1. (in Portuguese) Secretaria Municipal do Governo
2. (in Portuguese) Câmara dos Deputados
3. (in Portuguese) Beira-Mar é transferido para presídio em SP - Terra (February 27, 2003)
4. (in Croatian) Bio bih u divljim ligama Brazila da nisam došao u Dinamo - Jutarnji.hr (January 13, 2008)
