= Narcoparamilitary =

Narcoparamilitary is a term that refers to illegal armed groups created by drug traffickers in order to maintain their control over drug crops. These groups are also used to protect themselves from extortion by left-wing guerrilla groups and right-wing paramilitary groups, through what the two sides call "revolutionary tax" and "gramage tax" respectively. In this way, a narcoparamilitary group can be the enemy of a paramilitary group.Some concrete examples of this are the following:

== Examples ==
- The MAS (Death to Kidnappers) group, created by the bosses of the Medellín Cartel, to confront the FARC-EP and M-19 guerrillas, and was one of the nascent paramilitary groups based on the Self-Defense model peasant who preceded the AUC.
- The emerging criminal gangs (Bacrim) emerged after the demobilization of the AUC, used as a form of paramilitaries by drug traffickers.
- The Los Zetas group in Mexico at the service of the Gulf Cartel, specialized in the counterinsurgency warfare.

While Paramilitary refers to both elite armed groups, as is the case with counter-guerrillas based on the Peasant Self-Defense war model, as is the case with the AUC in Colombia. and the pre-existing Self-Defense groups, although the leaders of this organization also became involved with drug trafficking, as did the FARC, ELN, and EPL guerrillas, with whom they were at war because of ideological differences.

== See also ==
- Narcoguerrilla
- Narcoterrorism
