= Erismar Rodrigues Moreira =

- Born: 1975/1976; Varjota, Ceará, Brazil
- Died: October 29, 2005 (aged 29); Rocinha, Rio de Janeiro, Brazil
- Other names: Bem-Te-Vi
- Known for: Head of Amigos dos Amigos
- Predecessor: Luciano Barbosa
- Successor: Orlando Jose Rodrigues
- Criminal charges: Drug trafficking and smuggling, illegal distribution of cocaine

Erismar Rodrigues Moreira (died October 29, 2005), also known as "Bem-Te-Vi", was a gang leader in the Brazilian Rocinha, in Rio de Janeiro. He was considered to be the most wanted criminal in Rio during his prime.

== Early activities ==
Moreira's family moved from Ceará to Rocinha looking for work. His father then left Moreira's mother and children, traveling south. Moreira joined his first gang, Comando Vermelho (Red Command), at age 14. He stayed with Commando Vermelho until early 2004, when he switched allegiances to Amigos dos Amigos (Friends of Friends), which then quickly took control of Rocinha.

== Criminal career ==
In April 2004 Luciano Barbosa, the Amigos dos Amigos boss, was killed by police, and Moreira took his place, controlling cocaine-packing and selling. He gained the nickname Bem-Te-Vi. Moreira was known for his extravagant lifestyle. He often carried around guns needlessly and had several girlfriends. His band and himself had several gold plated pistols and assault rifles. His large gang had a complete hierarchy of various layers including bodyguards, security guards, contention keepers, soldiers, pushers, and watchguards.

Moreira was alleged to have connections with prominent Brazilian soccer players (for example Júlio César, former Inter Milan goalkeeper), musicians and actors. Moreira also gained the respect of the Rocinha populace by hosting expensive parties and defending the community. Moreira was killed by police in Operation Trojan early in the morning of October 29, 2005. Moreira was succeeded by his cousin, Orlando Jose Rodrigues, but was executed three days later by Antônio Francisco Bonfim Lopes and replaced by an unknown figure solely known as "Roca".
