= Milicia =

Milicia may refer to:

- Milicia (river), a river in Sicily that has its mouth at Palermo
- Milicia (plant), a plant genus in the family Moraceae
- Incorrect spelling of militia, an armed group of irregulars, often citizens of a community, organizing behind a cause
- Milícia (Brazil) - the paramilitary groups and organised crime syndicates in Brazil
