= Shadow Cities (book) =

2004 book by Robert Neuwirth

Shadow Cities: A Billion Squatters, A New Urban World
- Cover of book
- Author: Robert Neuwirth
- Language: English
- Subject: Squatting, informal settlements
- Published: 2004
- ISBN: 9780415953610

Shadow Cities: A Billion Squatters, A New Urban World is a 2004 book by Robert Neuwirth. He wrote it after visiting informal settlements such as Dharavi, Kibera and Rocinha.

== Overview ==
US-based journalist Robert Neuwirth spent two years visiting informal settlements across the globe, including Kibera (a slum in Nairobi, Kenya), Rocinha (a favela in Rio de Janeiro, Brazil), a gecekondu bölgesi zone in Sultanbeyli, Istanbul, Turkey, and Dharavi and Sanjay Gandhi Nagar (two squatter areas in Mumbai, India). In the book, Neuwirth draws on his experiences to argue that much can be learned from the self-organization and adaptability of squatters worldwide. He also gives a partial history of slums in such places as London, New York and Paris, suggesting that informal settlements are an integral part of urbanization and concluding on an optimistic note that there are so many squatters that their needs cannot be ignored.

== Critical reception ==
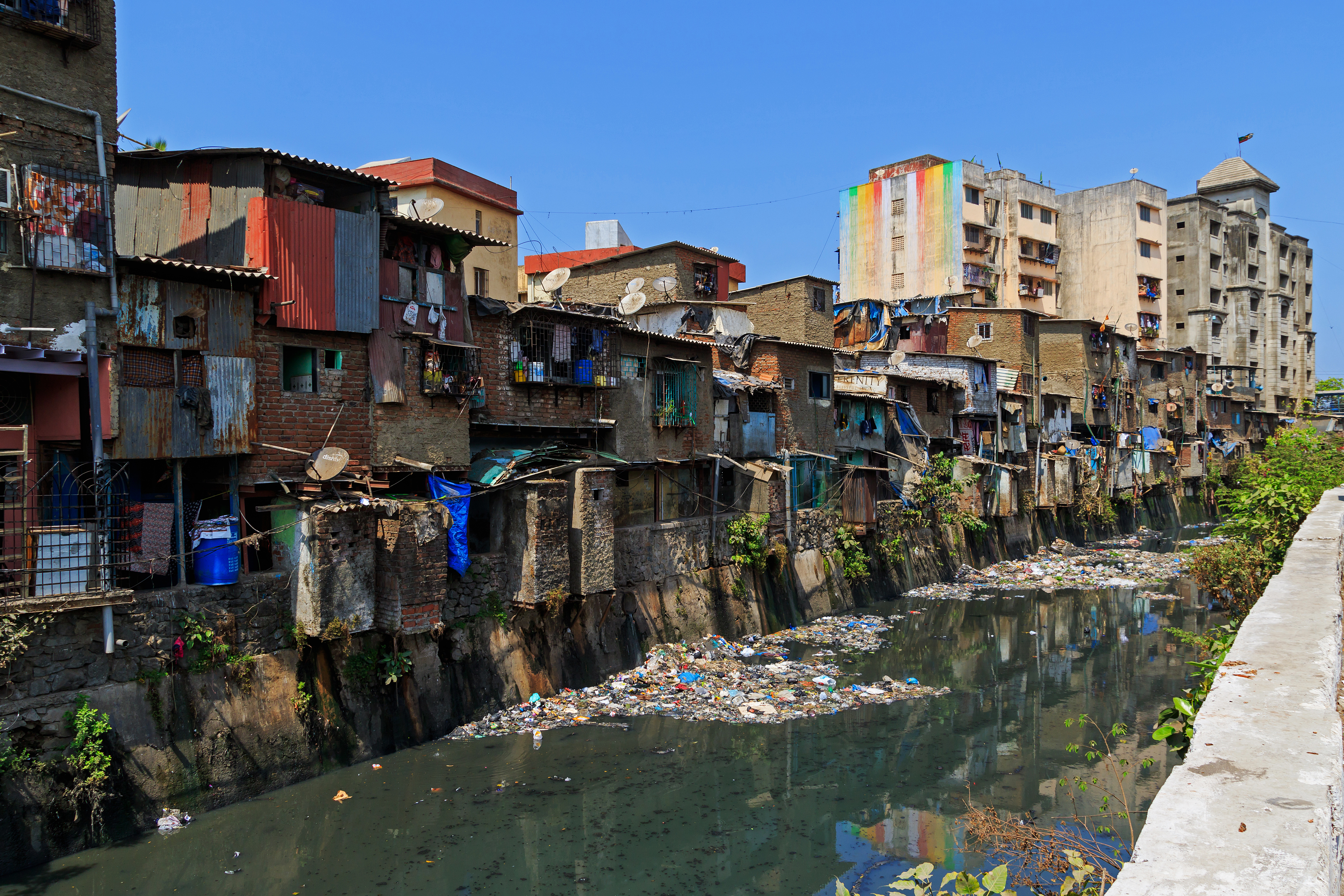
Dharavi in 2016

Reviewers welcomed the book as a general overview whilst pointing out defects for the specialist reader. Writing in Forum Qualitative Social Research, Brian Christens said the book was "rich with insights" whilst also criticising Neuwirth's methodology. David Satterthwaite reviewed the book twice. In Environment & Urbanization he takes exception to Neuwirth's dismissal of the National Slum Dwellers Federation in Mumbai as "'feel-good' organizing", arguing that the federation, allied with groups such as SPARC and Mahila Milan, provides a concrete means for slum dwellers to better their conditions. In International Journal of Urban and Regional Research, he criticises Neuwirth for writing about specific places whilst ignoring the extensive research already carried out on them; he also praises how the book "captures the vibrancy evident in many squatter settlements". In Harvard Design Magazine, John Beardsley commented what the "book lacks in trenchant social analysis or substantive policy understanding it more than makes up for in a close reading of what life is like in four settlements around the world".
