= Gecekondu =

Turkish word for a house "built overnight"

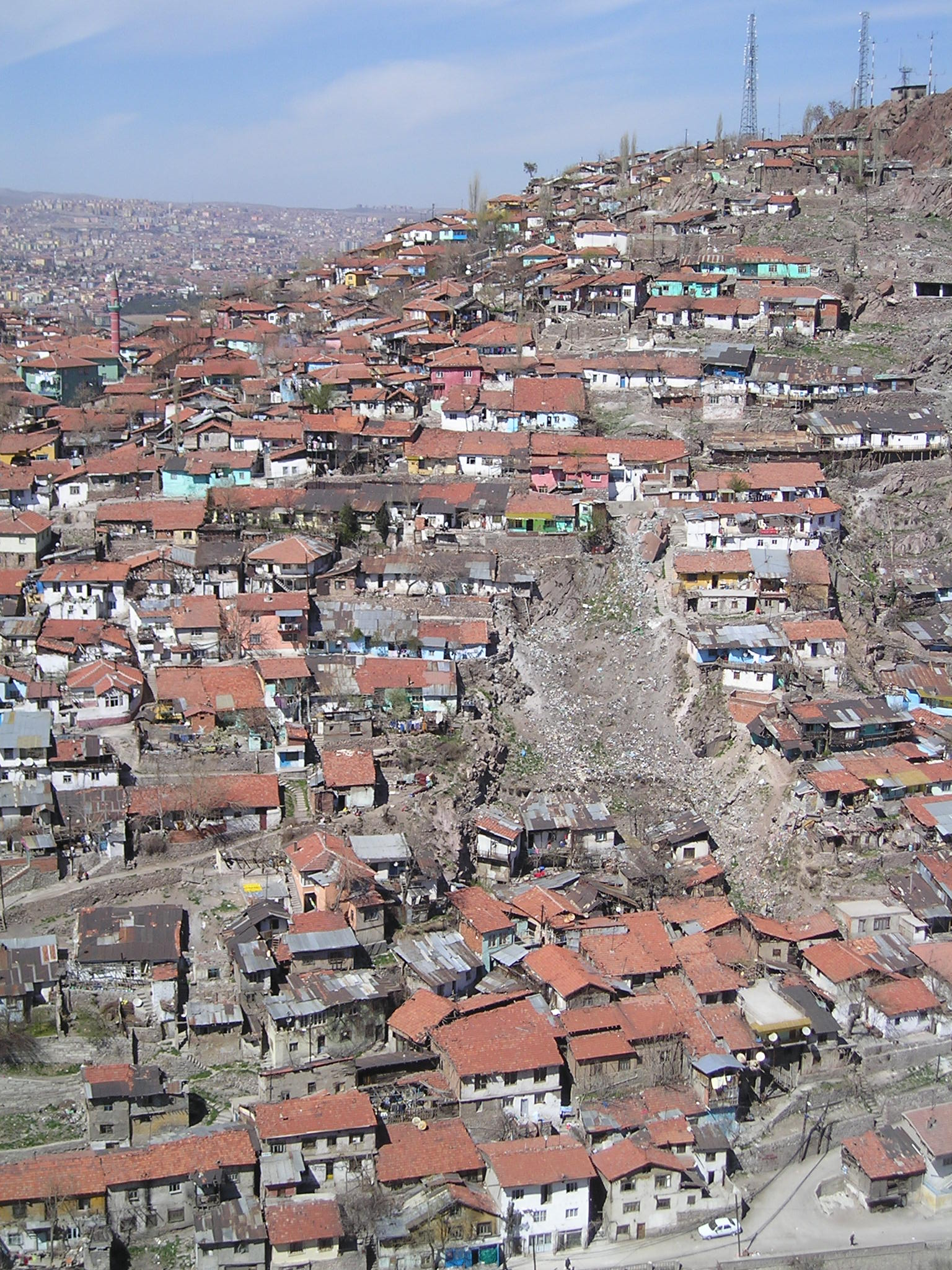
A gecekondu region in Ankara/Altındağ before demolishing.

Gecekondu, meaning 'put up overnight' (plural gecekondular), is a Turkish word meaning a house put up quickly without proper permissions, a squatter's house, and by extension, a shanty or shack. Gecekondu bölgesi is a neighborhood made of those gecekondular. Gecekondu neighborhoods offer an affordable alternative for shelter for many low-income households who can not afford to purchase or rent formal housing.

Before the gecekondu phenomenon, teneke mahalles (tin-can neighbourhoods) constituted the main pattern of informal housing starting from the late 19th century. The term gecekondu gained popularity with the construction of informal settlements by migrants from rural Turkey in the 1950s when the mechanisation of agriculture created a significant surplus population in villages. The immigrants, including Roma, who fled Bulgarian and south Romanian cities after the 1877-78 Russo-Turkish War, were the earliest founders of teneke mahalles in different parts of Istanbul such as Kumkapı and Nişantaşı. However, the inexpensive housing option provided by teneke mahalles soon became attractive for local poor such as Kurdish and Armenian immigrants.

== Etymology ==
In Turkish, gece means "night" and kondu means "placed" (from the verb konmak, "to settle" or "to be placed"); thus the term gecekondu comes to mean "placed (built) overnight". And bölge means a "zone", "district" or even "region", so a gecekondu bölgesi is a "suddenly built-up shanty-neighborhood." Gecekondu is a generic term that includes diverse spatial phenomena in size and physical conditions.

“Coined by city residents, the term [gecekondu initially] reflected almost exclusively their negative reaction to the influx of the villagers who defied established urban norms.”

== Usage ==
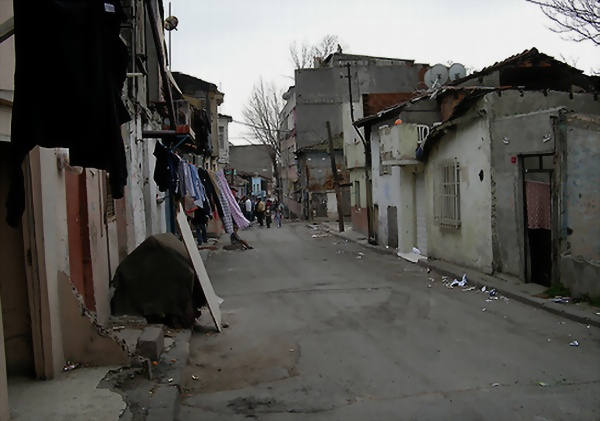
A gecekondu street in western Istanbul.

In common usage, it refers to the low cost apartment buildings or houses that were constructed in a very short time by people migrating from rural areas to the outskirts of the large cities. Robert Neuwirth writes in his book Shadow Cities that these squatters are exploiting a legal loophole which states that if one starts building after dusk and moves into a completed house before dawn the next day without having been noticed by the authorities, then the next day the authorities are not permitted to tear the building down but instead must begin a legal proceeding in court (and thus it is more likely one can stay). Such buildings may be constructed without going through the necessary procedures required for construction, such as acquiring building permits, and can be very densely populated. Neuwirth stated in 2004 that "half the residents of Istanbul - perhaps six million people - dwell in gecekondu homes". Despite connotations of urban poverty and overcrowding, almost all gecekondu neighbourhoods are supplied with running water and electricity.

The gecekondu phenomenon is directly linked with the problems of unemployment and poverty in the rural areas of Turkey, especially in the east of the country. In many instances entire villages have migrated to the outskirts of the large industrialized cities in order to seek a better standard of living.

At present, some gecekondu areas are being gradually demolished and replaced by modern mass-housing compounds developed by the government's Mass Housing Development Administration (TOKİ). Gecekondular are present both in small Turkish towns and in large cities such as İzmir, Ankara and Istanbul.

== See also ==
- Slum
- Shanty town
- Favela
- Tower and Stockade
- Township (South Africa)
- Tŷ unnos

== Bibliography ==
- Gençay, M. (1962) Gecekondu Problemi, Ankara, İmar ve İskân Bakanlığı Yayınları, Komisyon Raporları no. 6.
- Güney, M. (1949). 'Üsküdar Kazasında Gecekondu Problemi ve Başlıca Meseleleri', 1963-1964 Ders Yılı Sosyoloji Konferansları. İstanbul: İstanbul Üniversitesi Neşriyatı.
- Karpat, Kemal H. (1976) The Gecekondu: Rural Migration and Urbanization, Cambridge, Cambridge University Press.
- Öğretmen, İbrahim (1957) Ankara'da 158 Gecekondu Hakkında bir Monografi, Ankara, Ajans Türk Matbaası.
- Perouse, Jean F. (2004). "Deconstructing the Gecekondu". European Journal of Turkish Studies (1), 1-12.
- Şen, Faruk (1975) Die Entwicklung der Wohngebiete der Stadt Ankara seit 1923 unter besonderer Berücksichtgung des Gecekondu Phänomens, thesis, University of Saarbrücken.
- Yasa, İbrahim (1966) Ankara’da Gecekondu Aileleri, Ankara, Sağlık ve Sosyal Yardım Bakanlığı, Sosyal Hizmetler Genel Müdürlügü Yayınları, no. 64.
- Yavuz, Fehmi (1953) ‘Bina yapımı teşvik’, İller ve Belediyeler Dergisi, pp. 63–68.
- Yılgür, Egemen (2018) 'Teneke mahalles in the late Ottoman capital: A socio-spatial ground for the co-inhabitation of Roma immigrants and the local poor', Romani Studies, 28(2), 157-94.
- Yılgür, Egemen (2022) 'Formation of Informal Settlements and the Development of the Idiom Teneke Mahalle in the Late-Ottoman Istanbul', Urban History, 48(3), 608-637.
- Yörukhan, T. (1968) Gecekondular ve Gecekondu Bölgelerinin Sosyo-Kültürel Özellikleri, Ankara, İmar ve İskân Bakanlığı.
- Zadil, E. (1949) 'İstanbul'da Mesken Meseleleri ve Gecekondular' Sosyal Siyaset Konferansları Dergisi, 2, 65-87.
