= Brazilian militias =

Brazilian mafia and corrupt police groups

- Founders: Off-duty/ex-police and military personnel and vigilantes
- Leader: Various
- Founded: early 1980s
- Country: Brazil
- Groups: Liga da Justiça; Escritório do Crime; Nova Iguaçu militia Campinho militia
- Active regions: Mainly favelas in Rio de Janeiro and other major Brazilian cities.
- Political position: Far-right (historically)
- Status: Active
- Annual revenue: Funding from local businessmen and politicians, monopolizing and providing public services: (utilities, transportation and essential goods), television piracy, real estate business (land grabbing), contract killing, robbery, money laundering, extortion (loan sharking and protection rackets), pimping, illegal gambling, kidnapping, drug and arms trafficking and fraud

The Brazilian militias (Portuguese: Milícias) are illegal mafia-like vigilante paramilitary groups made up mostly of current and former (Municipal, Federal, Civil and Military) police officers, military soldiers and firefighters, as well as former drug traffickers, informants, prison guards and private security personnel, often in affiliation with the local political and business community.

Acting under the pretext of combating drug-trafficking related crime within their community, the militias are responsible for the torture and extrajudicial killings of numerous actual or suspected rival criminals in addition to political opponents and dissidents, while operating similarly to regular criminal syndicates by trade extortion and political influence including through electoral subversion and interference.

Militias carry out both vigilante and organized crime activities. In the favelas, gangs and cartels like Amigos dos Amigos (ADA), Terceiro Comando Puro (TCP) and Comando Vermelho (CV) control trafficking and extortion networks, openly selling drugs and carrying weapons as well as acting as the de facto authorities, building infrastructure and enforcing their own brand of law and order. These police-backed militias historically force out the drug traffickers in order to set up their own protection rackets, extorting residents and taxing basic services.

== History ==
The militias have their roots in the death squads of the Brazilian military dictatorship that took power in 1964 like the Esquadrão da Morte and successor groups like the Scuderie Detetive Le Cocq. They emerged in their modern incarnation in the mid-late 2000s, being made up of off-duty or former police officers with financial assistance from local businessmen who need protection from armed gangs.

Thanks to close ties to the official police force, the militias also often enjoy the approval and support, both politically and financially, of local politicians.

In 2006, the drug trafficking network Comando Vermelho started a conflict against the militias, leading to an escalating surge in violence citywide within many Rio de Janeiro favelas from throughout much of late 2000s and the 2010s onwards.

== Politicians ==
Brazilian militias have increasingly deep connections within the states' power dynamics.

Cesar Maia, Rio de Janeiro's mayor from 1993–1997 and 2001–2009, supported the rise of militias; in his words, militias were "community self-defense" and "an evil better than drug gangs".

In 2008, a group of journalists in disguise documenting a militia's activities were kidnapped and tortured by a militiamen. The journalists were held for seven hours before being freed without any harm. Although the identities of the journalists remain secret (with the exception of photojournalist Nilton Claudinho), two politicians were accused of orchestrating the kidnapping: Coronel Jairo and his son Dr. Jairinho.

Also in 2008, innumerable civilians have been killed by militias, who tried to incriminate local drug dealers in order to influence the public opinion and enforce the political candidacy of Carminha Jerominho. In that same year, a parliamentary commission of inquiry into the militias was installed in the Legislative Assembly of the State of Rio de Janeiro, chaired by then state deputy Marcelo Freixo. Several politicians were summoned to testify before this CPI, being accused of involvement with militia members, including councillors/candidates for councilor Nadinho de Rio das Pedras, Cristiano Girão, Deco and Doen, as well as deputy Marina Maggessi and deputy and former security secretary Marcelo Itagiba.

Militiamen have been responsible for high-profile assassinations, notably the murder of State Councilwoman Marielle Franco, in 2018.

== Known leaders and members ==
- Edmilson Gomes Menezes, a.k.a. "Macaquinho"/Little Monkey (incarcerated)
- Gerardo Alves Mascarenhas, a.k.a. "O Pirata"/The Pirate (incarcerated)
- Thiago Amorim de Queiroz, a.k.a. "Ratão"/Big Rat (incarcerated)
- Willians Tavares Mendonça da Silva, a.k.a. "Dengudo" (incarcerated)
- João Paulo de Castro Pereira, a.k.a. "JP da Carobinha" (incarcerated)
- Matheus da Conceição Santos, a.k.a. "Caveirinha"/Little Skull (incarcerated)
- Sérgio Rodrigues da Costa Silva

== In popular culture ==
- A favela-based militia group are minor antagonists in the 2009 video game Call of Duty: Modern Warfare 2.
- Corrupt police and militias are the main antagonists in the 2010 film Elite Squad: The Enemy Within.
- The Crachá Preto (Black Badge), a fictional far-right paramilitary group with ties to the police, are the secondary antagonists in the 2012 video game Max Payne 3.

== See also ==
- Crime in Brazil
- Paramilitarism in Colombia
- Grupos de Autodefensa Comunitaria
- List of criminal gangs in Brazil
- Ninja cops of the Philippine drug war
- Wallace Souza
- Pancasila Youth
- Marielle Franco
- Narcoguerrilla
- Narcoparamilitary
