= Escritório do Crime =

Brazilian militia

- Founded: April 19, 2007; 19 years ago
- Founding location: Rio de Janeiro, Brazil
- Years active: 2007–present
- Territory: Rio de Janeiro
- Criminal activities: Contract killing, land grabbing, arms trafficking, television piracy, chop shops, extortion, racketeering, fraud, money laundering, loan sharking, pimping and illegal gambling
- Rivals: Comando Vermelho, Terceiro Comando Puro, Amigos dos Amigos, Liga da Justiça

Escritório do Crime (lit. 'Crime Office'; EC) is a militia composed of gunmen and elite hitmen operating in the West Zone of Rio de Janeiro, Brazil. The organization emerged from illegal real estate activities, including land grabbing, construction, sale, and unlawful rental of properties. Its primary activity is contract killing. The group is made up of active and former military police officers and was previously led by former BOPE captain Adriano da Nóbrega — who was arrested twice, is suspected of having ties to the slot machine and jogo do bicho mafia, and is a defendant in land grabbing cases — as well as Military Police Major Ronald Pereira. Both were targets of Operation Untouchables.

== History ==
The group is suspected of involvement in 19 unsolved homicides since 2002, including the murder of bicheiro Waldomiro Paes Garcia on September 28, 2004, and the killing of businessman Marcelo Diotti da Mata in the parking lot of a restaurant on Avenida das Américas, which occurred on the same day as the murders of Marielle Franco and Anderson Gomes.

In August 2018, the group became the subject of an investigation regarding its potential involvement in the murder of Marielle Franco and Anderson Gomes, which took place on March 14 of that year. One hypothesis under consideration is that the killing of the city councilwoman and her driver was carried out by the group to prevent her from interfering in its business activities. According to this hypothesis, the councilwoman had opposed the militia's real estate operations by intervening in a high-rise development project in the Rio das Pedras favela, which would have resulted in significant financial losses for the group, thereby providing a possible motive for her execution. Although the group is suspected of involvement in the case, the possible participation of militiaman Orlando de Oliveira Araújo and city councilman Marcello Siciliano has not been ruled out.

On January 22, 2019, it was reported that recently elected Senator Flávio Bolsonaro, son of President Jair Bolsonaro, had employed, from early 2008 until November 2018, the wife of former captain Adriano da Nóbrega, who is suspected of leading the group. Additionally, since April 2016 — two years after Nóbrega's expulsion from the Military Police — the senator had also employed Nóbrega's mother, Raimunda Veras Magalhães. The other suspect in command of the militia, Major Ronald Pereira, was also honored by Flávio Bolsonaro at the Legislative Assembly.

In 2020, the Escritório do Crime was the target of a joint operation by the Civil Police and the Public Prosecutor's Office of Rio de Janeiro, designated Operation Thanatos, which executed four arrest warrants and twenty search warrants. The MPRJ described the group's modus operandi as involving the conspicuous use of large-caliber firearms, with shooters heavily armed and wearing balaclavas and camouflage to avoid identification, disembarking from vehicles and advancing toward targets to execute them without any chance of defense. Following the death of militiaman Adriano da Nóbrega in February of that year, brothers Leonardo "Mad" Gouvêa da Silva and Leandro "Tonhão" Gouvêa da Silva, who had played soccer with Adriano during childhood, assumed leadership of the group, with Mad as leader and Tonhão as his deputy and driver.

After Mad and his associates were arrested, no further activities of the group have been reported. On May 29, 2024, a Rio de Janeiro court sentenced both brothers to 26 years and 8 months in closed prison for the 2018 homicide of illegal gambling operator Marcelo Diotti da Mata.

== See also ==
- Brazilian militias
- Liga da Justiça
