= Bonde do Maluco =

Brazilian criminal organization

- Founded: 2015
- Founding location: Mata Escura Penitentiary Complex, Salvador, Bahia
- Years active: 2015–present
- Territory: Bahia, Espírito Santo, Sergipe, Goiás and Alagoas
- Activities: Murders, drug trafficking, robberies, rebellions, terrorist activities and organized crime
- Allies: Primeiro Comando da Capital, Terceiro Comando Puro, Guardiões do Estado
- Rivals: Comando Vermelho, Comando da Paz, Primeiro Comando de Vitória

Bonde do Maluco (BDM; English: Tram of the Crazy) is a Brazilian criminal organization originating from the Brazilian state of Bahia and specializing in drug trafficking, robberies, kidnappings, and murders. The faction originated through a movement by its leader Alexandre (Xandeco), who took over several locations in Salvador and surrounding areas.

== History ==
The criminal faction was founded in 2015, in Pavilion V of the Mata Escura Penitentiary Complex, in Salvador. The group was born as an offshoot of a defunct criminal faction known as Caveira (English: Skull), which had as its leader the bank robber José Francisco Lumes ("Zé de Lessa"), killed in a confrontation with military police officers from the Special Operations Battalion of the Military Police of Mato Grosso do Sul, in 2019. In addition to Zé de Lessa, the criminal Ednaldo Freire Ferreira (Dadá) is also considered one of the founders of Bonde do Maluco.

The gang is currently the largest criminal organization in Bahia, controlling some areas in Salvador and the Metropolitan Region, as well as the North-Central region of Bahia, the Sertão region of Bahia, and the Chapada Diamantina region. In 2017, just two years after its founding, the Bonde do Maluco already controlled 10 neighborhoods in Salvador and expanded its operations to the states of Sergipe, Goiás, and Alagoas. It is estimated that the Bonde do Maluco has 15,000 members in Bahia.

The criminal group is allied with the Primeiro Comando da Capital (PCC) and Terceiro Comando Puro (TCP). Its rivals include the Rio-based Comando Vermelho (CV) faction, as well as smaller groups through the state, such as Comando da Paz, Primeiro Comando de Eunápolis and Katiara.

In order to demarcate power, one of the symbols of Bonde do Maluco is the inscription of the organization's acronym (BDM) or the phrase "Tudo 3" ("All 3") on the walls of houses, businesses, sidewalks and public facilities.

== See also ==
- Crime in Brazil
