= Liga da Justiça =

- The Batman logo is commonly used as the organization's emblem.
- Founded: February 10, 1995; 31 years ago
- Founders: Ricardo Teixeira Cruz; Aldemar Almeida dos Santos
- Founding location: Cosmos, Rio de Janeiro, Brazil
- Years active: 1995–present
- Territory: Rio de Janeiro
- Leaders: Danilo Dias Lima; Luís Antônio da Silva Braga (surrendered)
- Criminal activities: Contract killing, land grabbing, arms trafficking, television piracy, fuel theft, chop shops, extortion, racketeering, fraud, money laundering, loan sharking, pimping and illegal gambling
- Allies: Terceiro Comando Puro
- Rivals: Comando Vermelho; Amigos dos Amigos; Escritório do Crime; Campinho militia

The Liga da Justiça (CL220; lit. 'Justice League') (Note: Also referred to in Portuguese as A Firma (lit. 'The Firm'), Família Braga (lit. 'Braga Family'), Bonde do Ecko (lit. 'Ecko's Tram') or 5.5.) is the largest militia organization in the Brazilian state of Rio de Janeiro. Its most famous members were former military police officer Ricardo Teixeira Cruz, also known as "Batman", former deputy Natalino José Guimarães, and former councilman Jerônimo Filho, nicknamed Jerominho. The name is a reference to the DC Comics superhero group of the same name, with the group also using the Batman logo as their symbol.

== History ==
The criminal group was created between 1995 and 1996 in the neighborhood of Cosmos, in the West Zone of Rio de Janeiro. Initially known as "Os Caras do Posto" ("The Gas Station Guys"), they operated from a Texaco station on the Guarujá Street, nearby the Flumitrens (now SuperVia) Cosmos railway station, and were led by Ricardo Teixeira Cruz and Aldemar Almeida dos Santos ("Robin"). The group rapidly expanded after its formation into the neighboring districts of Campo Grande, Inhoaíba, Paciência and Santíssimo, being later classified as a militia.

=== Internal struggles ===
In early 2009, a series of assassinations began among leaders of different militia groups. On January 5, Carlos Alexandre Silva Cavalcante ("Gaguinho"), identified as a member of the militia and indicted by the parliamentary commission of inquiry into militias, was killed. Investigators later suspected that the murder had been ordered by members of the Justice League itself, since Cavalcante had participated in the arrest of Natalino Guimarães hours earlier. Natalino Guimarães' brother, former city council member Jerônimo Guimarães ("Jerominho"), had also been arrested in a separate operation, and was later sentenced alongside 11 others for participating in the militia's activities.

Ricardo Teixeira was arrested that same year, and was sentenced in 2010 to 12 years in prison. The group was then taken over by Toni Ângelo de Souza Aguiar ("Toni"), and later by Marcos José Lima Gomes ("Gão"), after Toni was shot and arrested during a police operation in 2013. Gão's eventual arrest in 2014 sparked another internal power struggle, with Teixeira endorsing another militiaman nicknamed "Dentuço", while Toni backed former Terceiro Comando Puro (TCP) drug trafficker Carlos Alexandre da Silva Braga ("Carlinhos Três Pontes", known as "CL"), who was originally from the Três Pontes community in western Rio and considered a "close associate" of Toni.

Dentuço, a known hitman for the militia, later disappeared after being kidnapped by 10 armed men in the Barbante community, in Campo Grande. Now with control of the faction, Carlinhos formed an alliance between the militia and his former faction, a phenomenon known as the "Narco-Militia". Carlinhos was killed in a police operation in 2017, being succeeded by his brother, Wellington da Silva Braga ("Ecko"). Under his leadership, the militia expanded into the Baixada Fluminense region using a franchise-like system, where the faction provided weaponry and manpower to local groups, which in turn gave the militia a percentage of the profits.

Lieutenant Danilo Dias Lima ("Tandera"), who was the leader of one of these "franchises" and a close ally of Ecko, broke away from the organization in 2020 after internal disputes, including the death of 12 militiamen in Itaguaí, leading to a period of cold conflict. Tandera also allied himself to other smaller militia groups during this period, such as the Campinho militia in northern Rio. Ecko was killed during a raid on his family home in the Paciência neighborhood on June 12, 2021. He was succeeded by another member of the "Braga Family", his brother Luís Antônio da Silva Braga ("Zinho"), who had previously managed the militia's finances. Under Zinho, the conflict with Tandera's faction escalated, including the burning of 7 vans in 2021, at the orders of Tandera. On December 24, 2023, Zinho surrendered to the Federal Police of Brazil following consecutive operations against him.

== See also ==
- Brazilian militias
- Escritório do Crime
