= Sindicato do Crime =

- Founded: 27 March 2013; 13 years ago
- Years active: 2013–present
- Territory: Rio Grande do Norte and Paraíba
- Criminal activities: Drug trafficking, carjacking, fraud, arms trafficking, extortion, money laundering, robbery and kidnapping
- Allies: Bonde dos 40, Massa Carcerária, Okaida
- Rivals: PCC, CV, TCP, GDE

The Sindicato do Crime (SDC; lit. 'Crime Syndicate') (Note: Also known as 18.14, Sindicato RN (lit. 'RN Syndicate') or Sindicato do Crime do Rio Grande do Norte (lit. 'Crime Syndicate of Rio Grande do Norte').) is a Brazilian criminal organization that operates mainly within the prisons and drug-trafficking strongholds of Rio Grande do Norte. Like other organizations in the country's North and Northeast regions, it was created in response to the control exercised by the Primeiro Comando da Capital (PCC) over drug trafficking.

== History and operations ==
In March 2016, amidst a series of prison riots and acts of violence committed by SDC members on the streets of Natal, the number of PCC members on the city reportedly dropped from 300 to 200.

=== 2017 Alcaçuz riot ===
In mid-January 2017, a riot involving over 14 hours of clashes broke out at the Alcaçuz prison in the city of Nísia Floresta. Members of the Sindicato do Crime faction invaded the territory held by Primeiro Comando da Capital within the facility. Before fighting began, the power supply was cut off; consequently, the signal jammers designed to block mobile phone communications inside and outside the prison were disabled. The fighting was supported by gang members outside the prison, who approached the facility in a car and threw weapons over the wall, according to the president of the prison guards' union.

While the government of the state of Rio Grande do Norte reported that 27 people were killed, the death toll could exceed 30, according to police investigators. Most of the bodies were decapitated and mutilated. Heavily armed military police entered the prison after 12 hours, using armored vehicles. The Alcaçuz detention center is designed for 620 inmates but held at least 1,083 prisoners in 2017.

== See also ==
- List of criminal gangs in Brazil
