= Forum Qualitative Social Research =

- Discipline: Qualitative research
- Language: English, German, Spanish
- Edited by: Katja Mruck

Publication details
- History: 1999-present
- Publisher: Institute for Qualitative Research and Center for Digital Systems (Free University of Berlin) (Germany)
- Frequency: Triannually
- Open access: Yes

Standard abbreviations
- ISO 4: Forum Qual. Soc. Res.

Indexing
- ISSN: 1438-5627
- OCLC no.: 51038029

Links
- Journal homepage; Online access; Online archive

The Forum: Qualitative Social Research (German: Forum Qualitative Sozialforschung) is a triannual peer-reviewed online academic journal covering the theory, methodology, and application of qualitative research. The editor-in-chief has been Katja Mruck (Free University of Berlin) since the journal's conception. Articles published are in English, German, or Spanish. The journal also incorporates Internet-specific forms of publication such as video and sound recordings.

== Indexing and abstracting ==
The journal is indexed, e.g., by CSA Sociological Abstracts, CSA Worldwide Political Science Abstracts, International Bibliography of the Social Sciences, SocINDEX, the Directory of Open Access Journals, the Social Science Open Access Repository, and Scopus.

== History ==
The journal was established in 1999. It has since been developed into an information, communication, and networking portal. The project was initially funded by the Deutsche Forschungsgemeinschaft.
