= Rocinha =

Neighborhood in Rio de Janeiro, Brazil

- Neighborhood
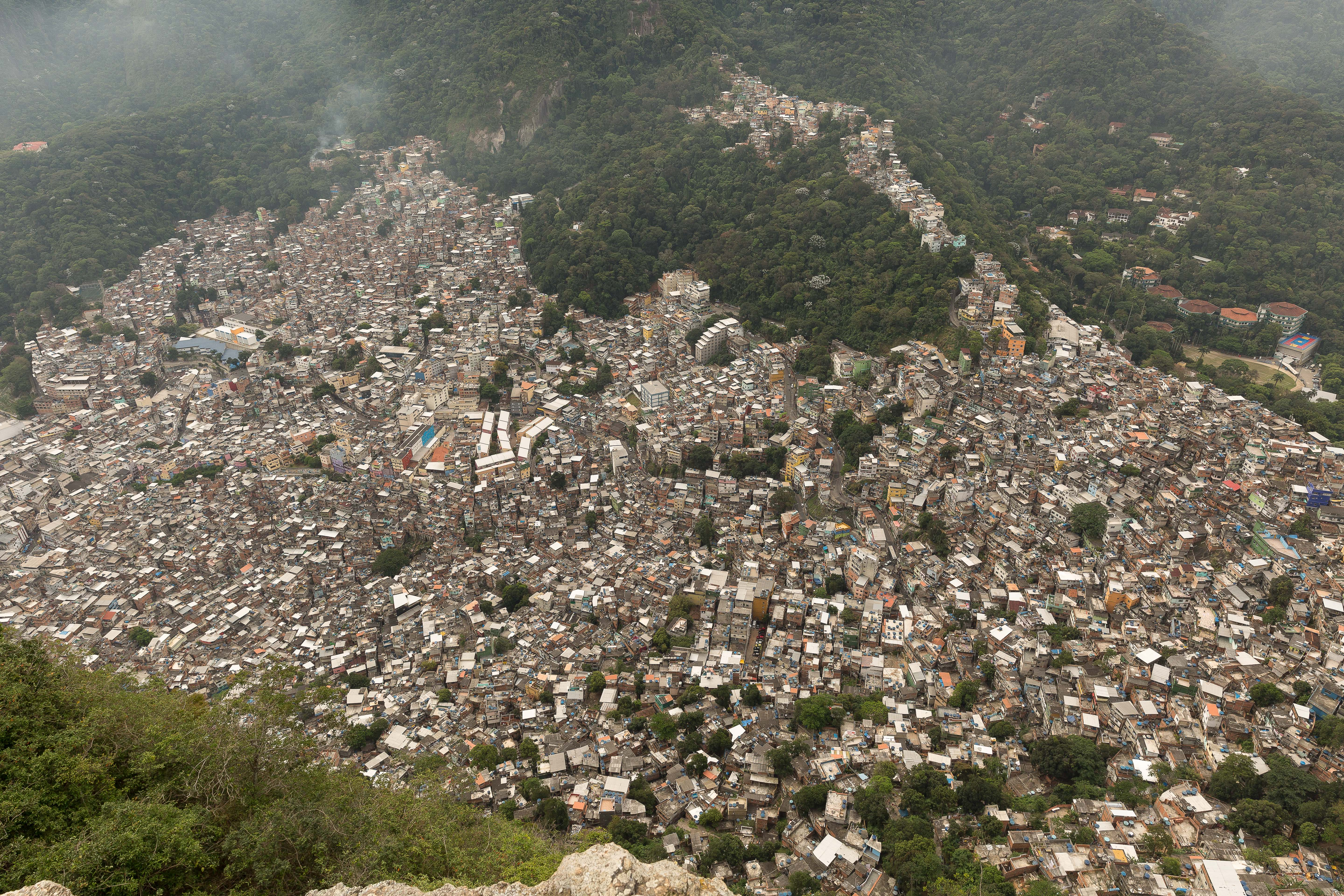
- Favela of Rocinha

- Location in Rio de Janeiro
- Coordinates: 22°59′19″S 43°14′54″W
- Country: Brazil
- State: Rio de Janeiro
- Municipality/City: Rio de Janeiro
- Zone: South Zone
- Administrative Region: Rocinha

Area
  - Total: 143.72 ha (355.1 acres)

Population (2022)
  - Total: 72,021
  - Density: 50,112/km^{2} (129,790/sq mi)

Rocinha (Portuguese pronunciation: [ʁɔˈsĩɲɐ], lit. 'little farm') is a favela, located in Rio de Janeiro's South Zone between the districts of São Conrado and Gávea. Rocinha is built on a steep hillside overlooking Rio de Janeiro and is located about one kilometre (0.62 mi) from a nearby beach. Most of the favela is on a very steep hill, with many trees surrounding it. Around 72,000 people live in Rocinha, making it the most populous favela in Rio de Janeiro.

Although Rocinha is officially categorized as a neighbourhood, many still refer to it as a favela. It developed from a shanty town into an urbanized slum. Today, almost all the houses in Rocinha are made of concrete and brick. Some buildings are three and four storeys tall, and almost all houses have basic plumbing and electricity. Compared to simple shanty towns or slums, Rocinha has a better developed infrastructure and hundreds of businesses such as banks, medicine stores, bus routes, cable television, including locally based channel TV ROC TV Rocinha, and, at one time, a McDonald's franchise. These factors help classify Rocinha as a favela bairro, or favela neighborhood.

== History ==
In the mid-20th century, Rio de Janeiro's industrial growth attracted many migrants from Brazil's drought-stricken northeast, leading to the formation of informal settlements like Rocinha. Due to a lack of affordable housing, residents built homes themselves, often without proper infrastructure. Rocinha grew rapidly and was recognized as a favela by the 1960s. From the 1970s to the 1990s, Rocinha expanded vertically in a crowded and unplanned manner. The government largely neglected the area, leading to the rise of drug cartels and gangs that took control of parts of the community. But with the strong sense of community, the local people established community groups that locally improved town infrastructure, educational facilities, and health-care services.

== Community ==
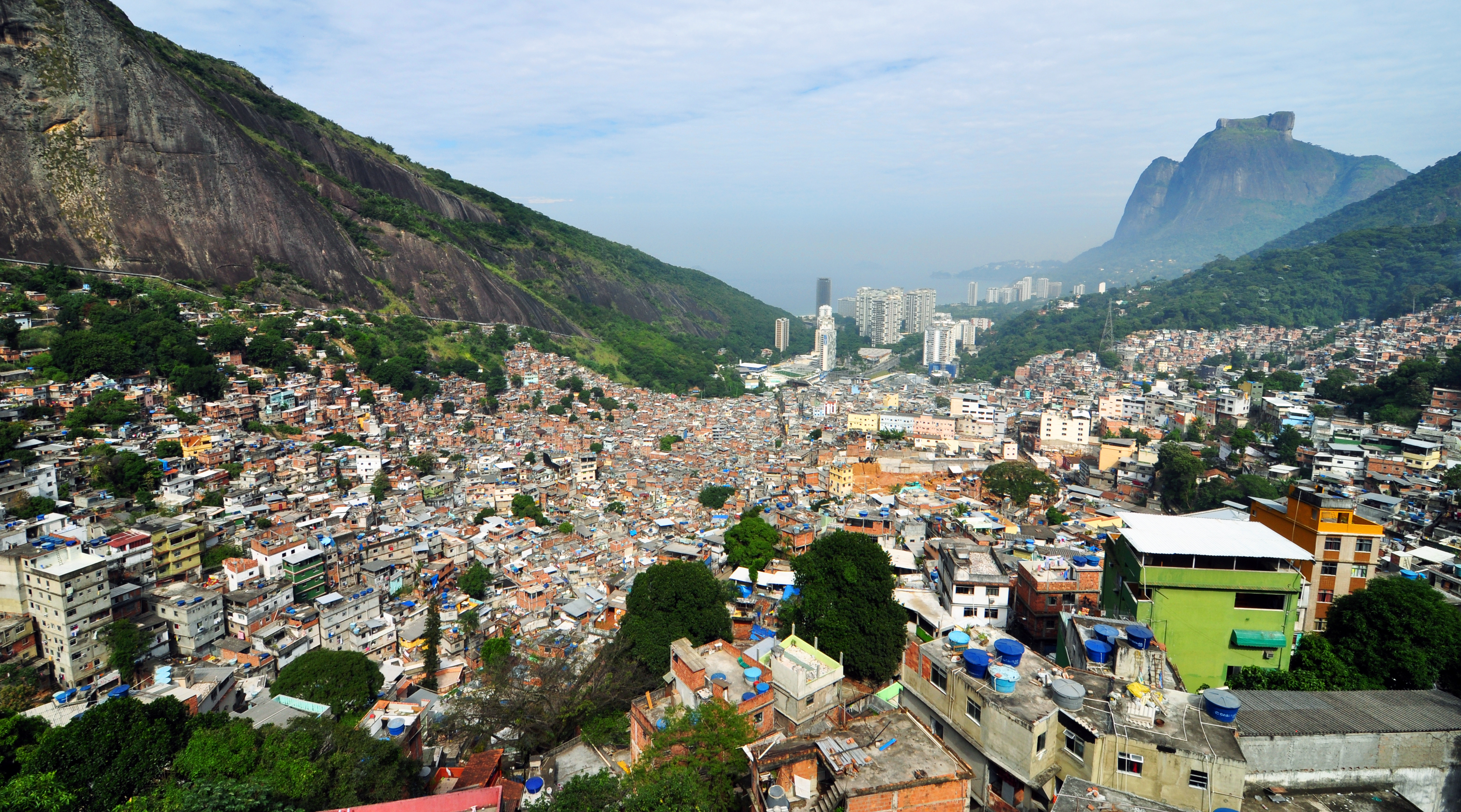
Rocinha from within

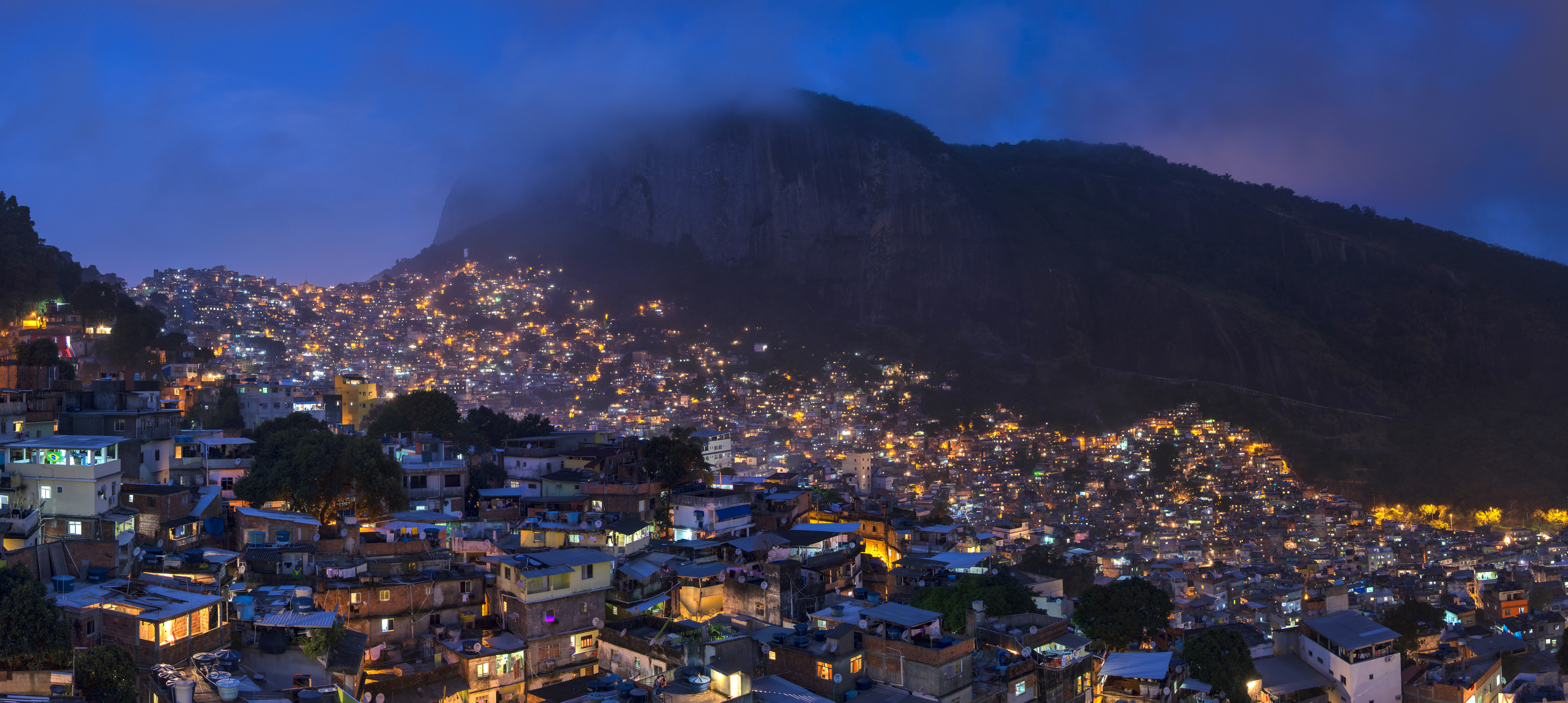
Rocinha at night

There are a number of community organizations at work in Rocinha, including neighbourhood associations and numerous NGOs and non-profit educational and cultural institutions. Rocinha is home to most of the service workers in Zona Sul (the South Zone of Rio).

In recent years, due to its relative safety in comparison to other favelas, Rocinha has developed tourism-oriented activities such as hostels, nightclubs, and guided tours. In September 2017, between 150 and 601 tourists were estimated to visit the slum per day, despite foreign governments' and the Rio police's safety warnings recommending against it. In October 2017, a Spanish tourist died after being shot by the police while visiting Rocinha during a turf war.

During the years of 2014 to 2017, Rocinha was controlled by Amigos dos Amigos, and is often caught in violent disputes among (and within) different criminal organizations.

=== Police and military operations ===
In November 2011, a security operation was undertaken where hundreds of police and military patrolled the streets of Rocinha to crack down on rampant drug dealers and bring government control to the neighbourhood.

In December 2017, drug kingpin Rogério da Silva, known as Rogério 157, was arrested in Rocinha, in an operation involving 3,000 members of the Brazilian military and police forces. Rogério was wanted on charges of homicide, extortion, and drug trafficking.

Rocinha is one of the most developed favelas. Rocinha's population was estimated at between 150,000 and 300,000 inhabitants during the 2000s; but the IBGE Census of 2010 counted only 69,161 people. In 2017, The Economist reported a population of 100,000 in an area of 1 km^{2} (250 acres).

== In literature, film, and music ==
Robert Neuwirth discusses Rocinha in his book entitled Shadow Cities. In the animated film Rio, many scenes take place in Rocinha.

Rocinha is the setting of the book Nemesis: One Man and the Battle for Rio by Misha Glenny, in which he describes the rise and fall of Antônio Francisco Bonfim Lopes.

In 1998, Philip Glass wrote an orchestral piece titled "Days and Nights in Rocinha". It was meant as a reference to Ravel's Boléro, written for Dennis Russell Davies, to thank him for putting Glass' works on stage. He was inspired by dance music that he heard during the carnival, resulting in a samba-like rhythmical structure with time signature changes and varieties, such as 14/8, 15/8, and 9/8+4/4.

The 2008 film The Incredible Hulk featured aerial footage of Rocinha, showing the large number of intermodal containers repurposed as housing, and included an extensive chase scene filmed in the favela on the ground and across rooftops. It was also featured in the 2011 film Fast Five.

== In mass media and popular culture ==
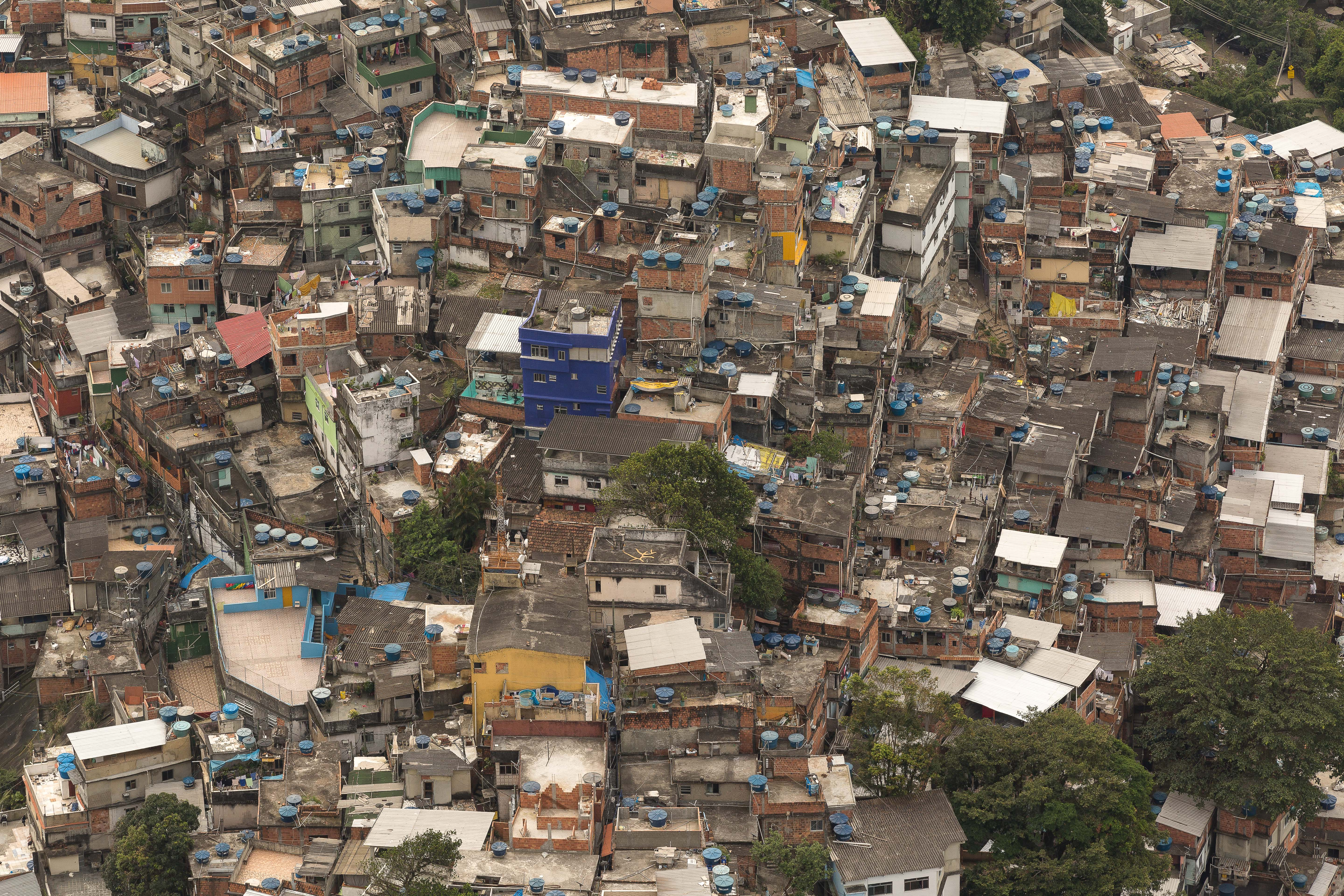
Aerial view of Rocinha

Many celebrities have visited Rocinha, including Mikhail Gorbachev (during the Earth Summit of 1992) and actor Christopher Lambert. Some episodes of the Brazilian television series Cidade dos Homens were filmed there.

=== Video games ===
- In the 2009 video game Call of Duty: Modern Warfare 2, two of the main campaign missions and a multiplayer map based on it are set in the favela.
- In Call of Duty: Black Ops III, Rocinha is mentioned as the hometown of the specialist Outrider.
- In the 2015 tactical first-person shooter game Tom Clancy's Rainbow Six Siege, a map called "Favela" is based on Rocinha.
- Harran, the city in which Dying Light takes place, was inspired in part by the favela.

== See also ==
- Sérgio Cabral
- Rio de Janeiro
- Pacifying Police Unit
- Community policing
