= Ângela do Amaral Rangel =

Brazilian writer and poet

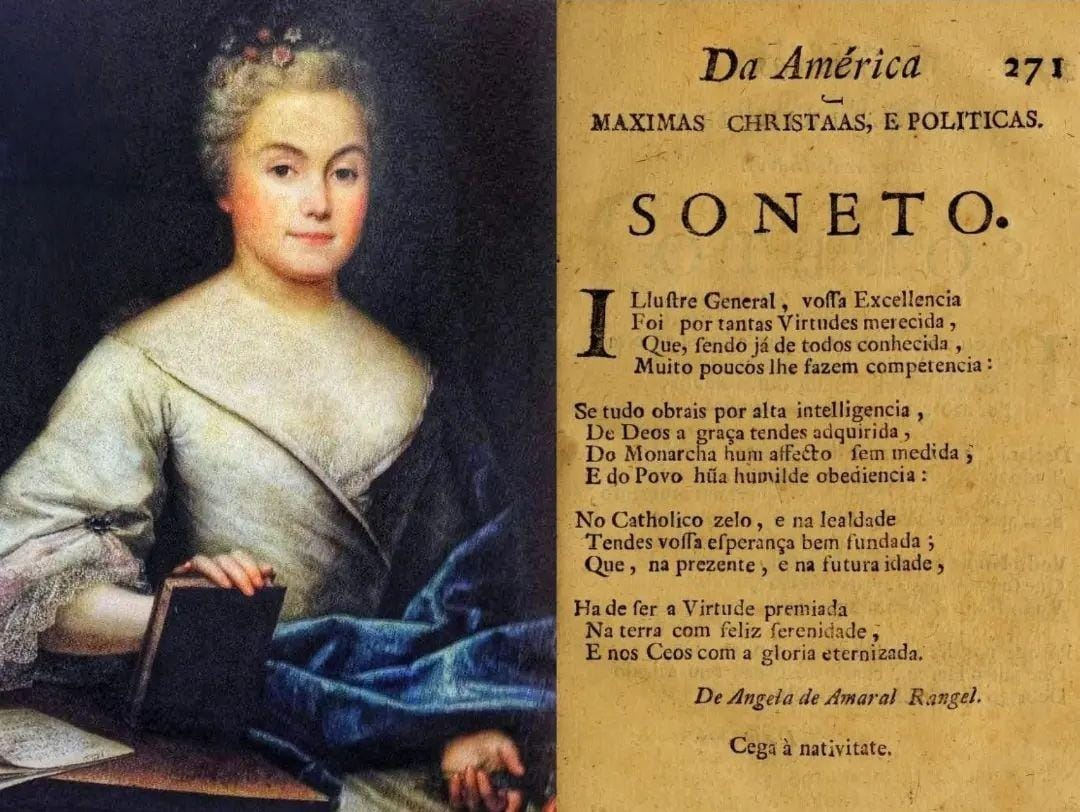
- Ângela do Amaral Rangel and one of her sonnets (1700s)
- Born: May 21, 1725; Rio de Janeiro, Brazil
- Occupations: Journalist and Poet

Ângela do Amaral Rangel (21 May 1725 - ?) was a Brazilian journalist and poet.

Nicknamed "a Ceguinha" - the blind one - Ângela do Amaral Rangel none the less became the first Brazilian woman to have her poems published in Colonial Brazil, and became a member of Brazil's Academia dos Selectos (English, Academy of the Select) on 30 January 1752.

Rio de Janeiro's Bangu neighborhood has a street named in her honor.

== Biography ==
Ângela do Amaral Rangel was born on May 21, 1725 to Antônio Marcos Vale in Custódia Range, a prosperous family in Rio de Janeiro. Despite the fact that she was blind from birth in an era with limited resources for educating children with visual impairments, Ângela learned to compose poetry in Portuguese and Spanish.

Her renown as a poet led Ângela do Amaral Rangel to be the only woman invited to participate among judges, doctors, and priests in the Brazilian literary and scientific group Academia dos Seletos in 1752.

The date of her death is unknown.

== Published Works ==
Ângela Rangel's verses in Portuguese and Spanish were included in Júbilos da América na gloriosa exaltação e promoção do ilustríssimo senhor Gomes Freire de Andrade: Coleção das obras da academia dos seletos, que na cidade do Rio de Janeiro se celebrou em obséquio e aplauso do dito excelentíssimo herói edited by Manuel Tavares de Siqueira e Sá. Lisbon, Portugal: Oficina de Manuel Álvares Solano (1752).
