= Guardiões do Estado =

Brazilian criminal organization

Guardians of the State
- Guardiões do Estado
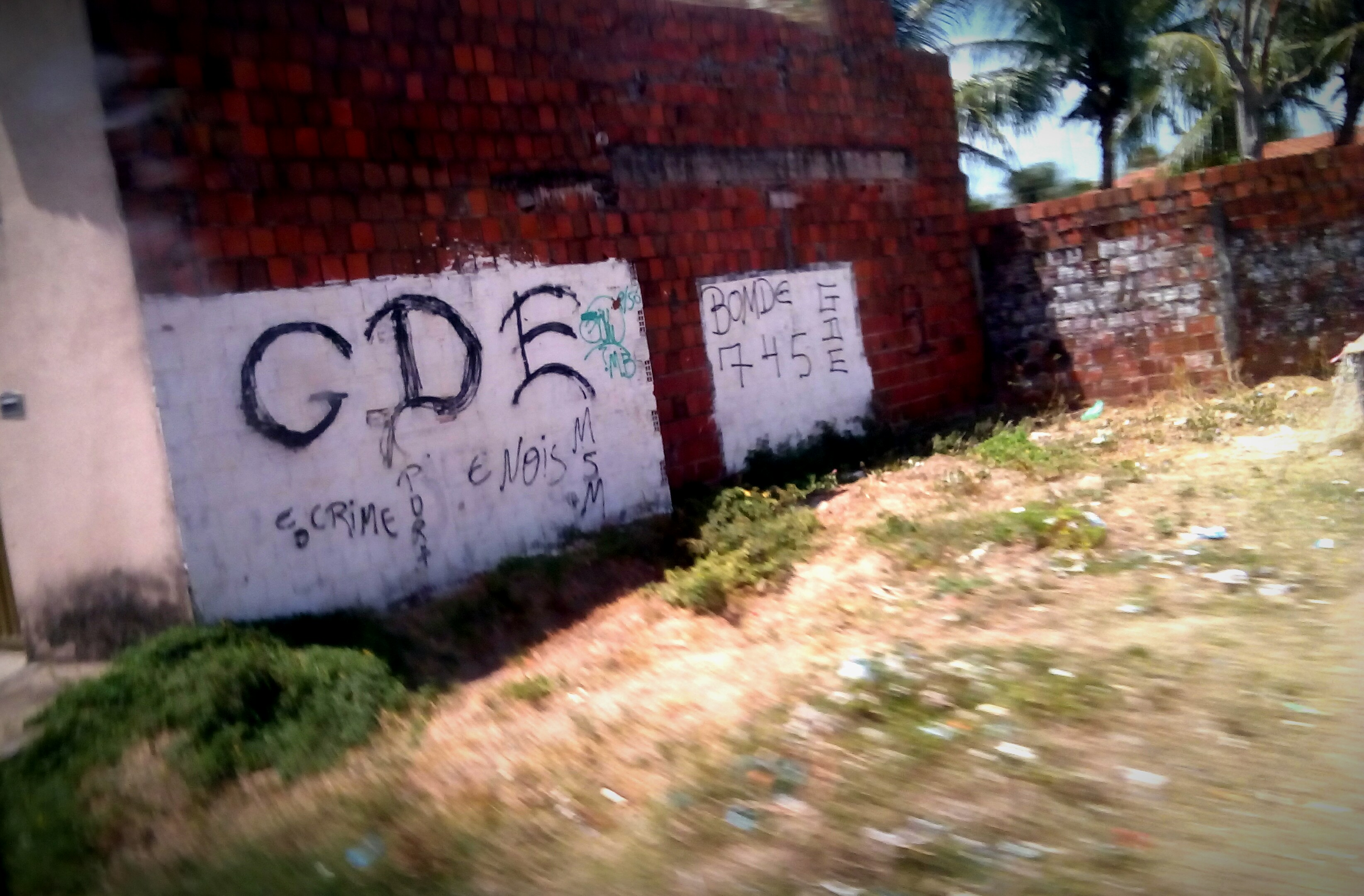
- Marking the territory of the criminal faction
- Territory: Ceará, Brazil
- Ethnicity: Brazilians
- Activities: Murder, drug trafficking, extortion, assault and rebellion
- Allies: Terceiro Comando Puro, Primeiro Comando da Capital, Bonde do Maluco
- Rivals: Comando Vermelho, Família do Norte, Sindicato do Crime, Massa Carcerária

The Guardians of the State (Brazilian Portuguese: Guardiões do Estado), or the acronym GDE, is a Brazilian criminal faction. It operates in the state of Ceará.

It is the 4th largest faction in Brazil and is made up mostly of poorly prepared teenagers, pre-teens and young adults. One of the main reasons would be the lack of monthly fees.

The place or date of origin of the faction is not known for sure, as some sources claim that the faction emerged in mid-2012, others claim that it emerged in 2006, 2015, 2014 or 2016, but the most accepted is that it appeared in 2017, in the community of Conjunto Palmeiras.

Its internal power structure is decentralized, and therefore the faction lacks a leader. Currently, it is known for burning buses, massacres and homicides in the state, the most notable being the Cajazeiras massacre.

== See also ==
- List of criminal gangs in Brazil
- Cajazeiras massacre
- Attacks in Ceará in 2019
