= Terceiro Comando Puro =

Brazilian drug cartel

- The Israeli flag is a symbol of the Terceiro Comando Puro.
- Founded: 2002; 24 years ago
- Founder: Nei da Conceição Cruz, "Facão"
- Founding location: Maré, Rio de Janeiro
- Years active: 2002 – present
- Territory: Brazil
- Leaders: Álvaro Malaquias Santa Rosa; Thiago da Silva Folly; Bruno da Silva Loureiro; Marcelo Santos das Dores; Rafael Alves
- Activities: drug trafficking, murder, assault, and extortion
- Allies: Primeiro Comando da Capital, Bonde do Maluco, Guardiões do Estado, Liga da Justiça, A Família Capixaba
- Rivals: Amigos dos Amigos, Comando Vermelho, Família do Norte, Sindicato do Crime, Comando da Paz, Massa Carcerária, Primeiro Comando de Vitória

Terceiro Comando Puro (Pure Third Command, TCP) is a Brazilian criminal organization in Rio de Janeiro that split off from the Terceiro Comando (TC) in 2002 due to disputes about TC's affiliations with the Amigos dos Amigos gang. TC weakened while TCP strengthened and eventually absorbed its parent group's members. TCP is primarily involved with drug trafficking.

The faction continues to operate against the Comando Vermelho in regions outside Rio de Janeiro, including the Brazilian states of Amazonas, Ceará, Bahia and Espírito Santo.

== Leadership ==
As of 2024, there are currently five major leaders, two of which are currently incarcerated. Thiago da Silva Folly, who is known as "TH", is in charge of drug trafficking in the Maré neighborhood in Rio de Janeiro. The Israel Complex which is a group of favelas in the neighborhoods of Parada de Lucas, Vigário Geral, Cidade Alta, Cinco Bosas, Quitungo and Pica-Pau is controlled by Álvaro Malaquias Santa Rosa, who is known as "Peixão" ("Big Fish"). Bruno da Silva Loureiro, who is known as "Coronel" ("Colonel"), operates in western Rio de Janeiro.

There are two leaders who are currently serving prison sentences: Marcelo Santos das Dores, known as "Menor P" ("Minor P"), and Rafael Alves, known as "Peixe" ("Fish"), who was formerly in charge of drug trafficking in Vila Aliança.

=== Peixão ===
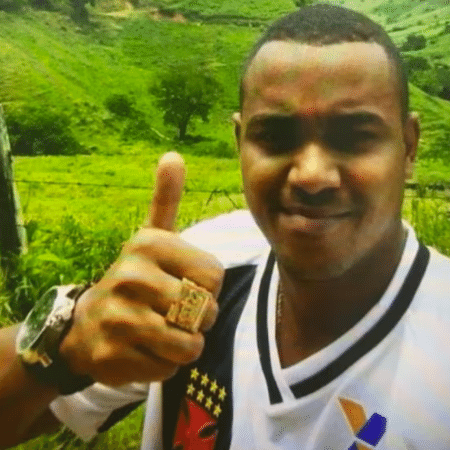
Álvaro Malaquias Santa Rosa (Peixão)

Álvaro Malaquias Santa Rosa, better known by the alias “Peixão” (born 14 March 1986 in Rio de Janeiro), is a Brazilian criminal affiliated with Terceiro Comando Puro. He operates as the leader of the organization in the favelas of the Complexo de Israel (Vigário Geral, Cidade Alta, and Parada de Lucas) in the city of Rio de Janeiro. Peixão became notable for imposing a form of Evangelical fundamentalism, described by researchers and the media as 'Narco-Pentecostalism', in the areas under his control. This has resulted in the widespread persecution and expulsion of practitioners of Afro-Brazilian religions from those communities. There have also been reports that the trafficker has prohibited Catholic worship, although this does not appear to have occurred systematically.

== Usage of Evangelical and Israeli aesthetics ==
Terceiro Comando Puro has adopted, at least nominally, the same Pentecostal-Charismatic Christianity that has been growing among residents of the Brazilian favelas, including the idea that the existence of the State of Israel will help bring about the Second Coming of Jesus. Terceiro Comando Puro gave the name of "Complexo de Israel" (Israel Complex) to the group of five favelas in northern Rio de Janeiro that it controls, and drug packages marked with the Star of David have been confiscated from the gang by Brazilian police. In the regions controlled by drug trafficker Álvaro Malaquias Santa Rosa, aka Peixão, Israeli flags were raised and Stars of David were displayed on the walls in several locations. Additionally, the gang has been reported to persecute adherents of Afro-Brazilian religions, Spiritism and Catholics.

This tendency of intertwining between drug trafficking factions and neo-pentecostalism has been dubbed by journalists and researchers as "Narco-Pentecostalism".

== See also ==
- Crime in Brazil
- List of criminal gangs in Brazil
