= Social Science Open Access Repository =

Repository

- Producer: GESIS – Leibniz Institute for the Social Sciences (Germany)

Access
- Cost: Free

Coverage
- Disciplines: Social sciences
- Record depth: Index, abstract & full-text
- Format coverage: journals, conference papers

Links
- Website: www.gesis.org/ssoar/home

The Social Science Open Access Repository (SSOAR) is a database that offers open, online access to peer-reviewed articles from the social sciences.

== Overview ==
SSOAR is a full-text server, and Internet users can access full-text versions of documents free of charge and without prior registration. The repository follows the so-called "Green Road", a strategy for the implementation of Open Access whereby preprints or postprints of scholarly contributions are archived in an openly accessible repository in addition to being published in toll-access journals, etc.

The project is coordinated by an editorial team that reviews each submission, with input from an advisory board composed of members from scholarly societies.

Postprints from 2025 onwards get indexed, only if their articles are from journals listed in the Directory of Open Access Journals.
