= Narcoterrorism =

Terrorist violence to benefit drug trafficking

Aftermath of the DAS Building bombing

Narcoterrorism or Drug-related terrorism, is a term which describes a form of terrorism employed by narcotics traffickers to influence the policies of a government to keep anti-drug laws from being enforced. The term narcoterrorism was coined by former President Fernando Belaúnde Terry of Peru in 1983 when describing terrorist attacks against his nation's anti-narcotics police. The term lacks a universally accepted legal definition. Critics have argued that conceptual imprecision allows the narcoterrorist label to be broadly applied to justify expansive policies under the war on drugs.

== By country ==
=== Afghanistan ===
Narcoterrorism has been used in Afghanistan to fund operations with sales of opium and heroin in the Afghanistan War.

=== Colombia ===
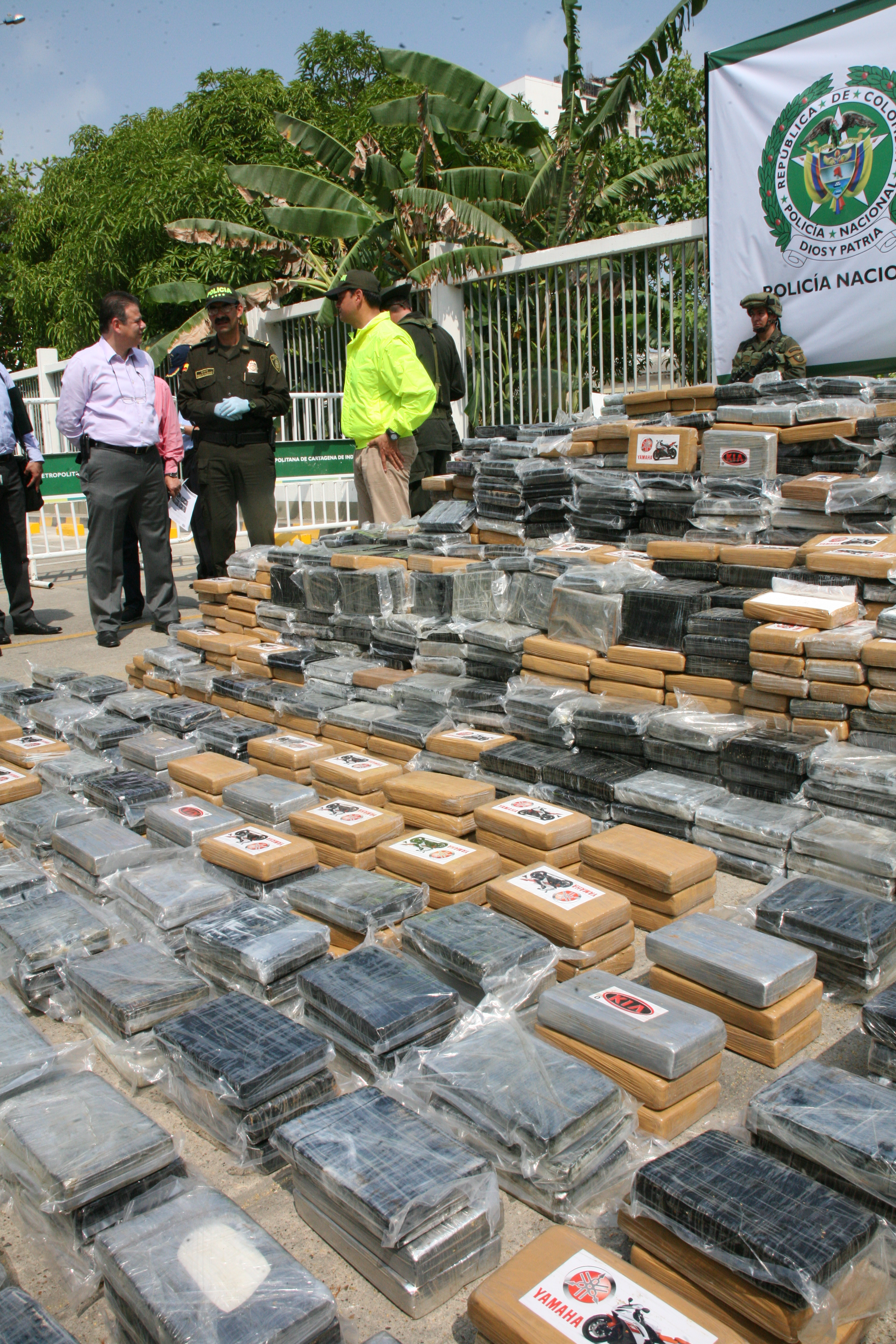
Stacks of cocaine seized by the National Police of Colombia.

The illegal drug trade in Colombia has, since the 1970s, centered successively on four major drug trafficking cartels: Medellín, Cali, Norte del Valle, and North Coast, as well as several bandas criminales, or BACRIMs. The trade eventually created a new social class and influenced several aspects of Colombian culture, economics, and politics.

The Colombian government efforts to reduce the influence of drug-related criminal organizations is one of the origins of the Colombian conflict, an ongoing low-intensity war among rival narcoparamilitary groups, guerrillas and drug cartels fighting each other to increase their influence and against the Colombian government that struggles to stop them.

==== History of narcoterrorism in Colombia ====
On April 30, 1984, a motorcycle gunman from the Medellin Cartel killed the minister of Justice Rodrigo Lara. On November 6, 1985 the 19th of April Movement (Marxist guerrillas) sieged the palace of Justice and held all the supreme magistrates hostage. The response from the Colombian military and police caused the building to burn, resulting in the deaths of 91 people, 11 of which were judges. Although the M-19 denies being funded from outside sources, multiple sources say the Medellin Cartel funded them. Additionally, numerous bombings took place across the country, the most memorable one being the one that brought down Avianca Flight 203 during its flight over Soacha, resulting in 107 dead in 1989.

In Colombian history, the FARC were initially major enemies of the drug cartels. The MAS (Spanish: Muerte a los secuestradores, lit. 'Death to the kidnappers') was a group created by the most eminent members of the Cali Cartel, including Escobar and Ochoa, against the guerrillas who had kidnapped one of Ochoa's sisters. The MAS was responsible for the deaths of 500 members of the Patriotic Union, a political party that emerged from the demobilization of part of the FARC in the 1990s. Significantly, it is worth recalling that the Medellin Cartel refused to buy coca from peasants living in areas under FARC control. From then on, even when there was evidence of collaboration between FARC and the drug traffickers, these connections were described as "temporary alliances".

President Alvaro Uribe, who was elected on the idea of waging an all-out war against the FARC, over-emphasized the link between drugs and the FARC as well as the terrorist nature of the guerilla group in a post 2001 context: "(Álvaro Uribe) increasingly equated the guerrillas with drug traffickers and terrorists".

=== India ===
As an individual, Dawood Ibrahim was the first drug lord to be officially and formally classified as a global terrorist in 2003. He is believed to have had ties to the terrorist organization al-Qaeda, as well as to its leader, Osama bin Laden.

=== Kosovo ===
Kosovo, during the war in 1999. The Kosovo Liberation Army (KLA) used "narcoterrorism" to finance its operations.

=== Mexico ===
In Mexico, certain drug lords such as Nemesio Oseguera Cervantes and Iván Archivaldo Guzmán Salazar were formally classified as global terrorists in 2025. Similarly, the Jalisco New Generation Cartel, Gulf Cartel, Sinaloa Cartel, La Nueva Familia Michoacana, Northeast Cartel, and Carteles Unidos have been formally classified as both FTOs and SDGTs.

On February 22, 2026, Nemesio Oseguera "El Mencho" Cervantes (leader of the Jalisco New Generation Cartel) and six other people were killed in a Mexican Army security operation in Tapalpa, Jalisco. The operation sparked clashes in the area, resulting in shootouts, explosions, and the burning of several vehicles and stores throughout the state, road blockades, kidnappings, and an apparent state of siege, giving rise to narcoterrorism.

=== United States ===
A 2013 Congressional Research Service report noted that in 2003, the Drug Enforcement Administration (DEA) reported that 14 of 36 (39%) of the groups designated by the U.S. as foreign terrorist organizations "were involved 'to some degree' in illicit narcotics activity" while in fiscal year 2010, the U.S. Department of Justice (DOJ) "reported that 29 of the top 63 international drug syndicates, identified as such on the consolidated priority organization target (CPOT) list, were associated with terrorists".

The designation of narcoterrorism by U.S. policy has been criticized for categorizing violent resistance to drug enforcement as a national security threat to justify the further militarization of the war on drugs.

In 2025, by executive order, the United States expanded its approach in its counter drug campaign to designate foreign drug cartels as foreign terrorist organizations. This gave the United States military broad authority to employ military force against drug cartels and to target their leaders through direct military action.

That year, Donald Trump formally pardoned the former president of Honduras, Juan Orlando Hernández, convicted of drug trafficking.

== Perspectives on origins ==
Critics of the prohibition of drugs have asserted that prohibition itself funds terrorism by indirectly creating a black market for banned substances from which criminal organizations profit.

== See also ==
- Narcoguerrilla
- Anti-Narcotics Force
- Terruqueo
- War on terror
