= Narcoguerrilla =

Intersection of drug cartel and guerrilla groups

A narco-guerrilla is a guerilla who funds their operation via the illegal drug trade.

== Definition ==
The term defines narcoguerrilla as the symbiosis between guerrilla groups (especially those of a Marxist nature) and drug trafficking groups. In certain cases, the symbiotic relationship of guerrilla groups with drug traffickers becomes so deep that it becomes impossible to distinguish whether it is an organization in search of a political objective, or a group that acts as the armed wing of drug trafficking. They are usually identified as a counterpart to Narcoparamilitary, which is the symbiosis of paramilitary groups (usually extreme-right) with drug trafficking groups. Such groups are typically closely linked.

== History ==
The term is attributed to Lewis Tamb, then United States ambassador to Columbia. He used it for the first time in 1982. Two or three years later in Costa Rica, he was implicated in drug trafficking to finance the Contras.

The United States has been implicated in the use of drug money to subsidize guerrillas, as in the case of the Nicaraguan Contras (a right-wing anti-Marxist group).

== See also ==
- Narcoterrorism
