= Vila Aliança =

Human settlement in Brazil

Coordinates: 22°52′10″S 43°28′44″W

Vila Aliança is a region of Rio de Janeiro, but not officially recognized as a neighborhood.
