= Robert Neuwirth =

American journalist, author, and investigative reporter

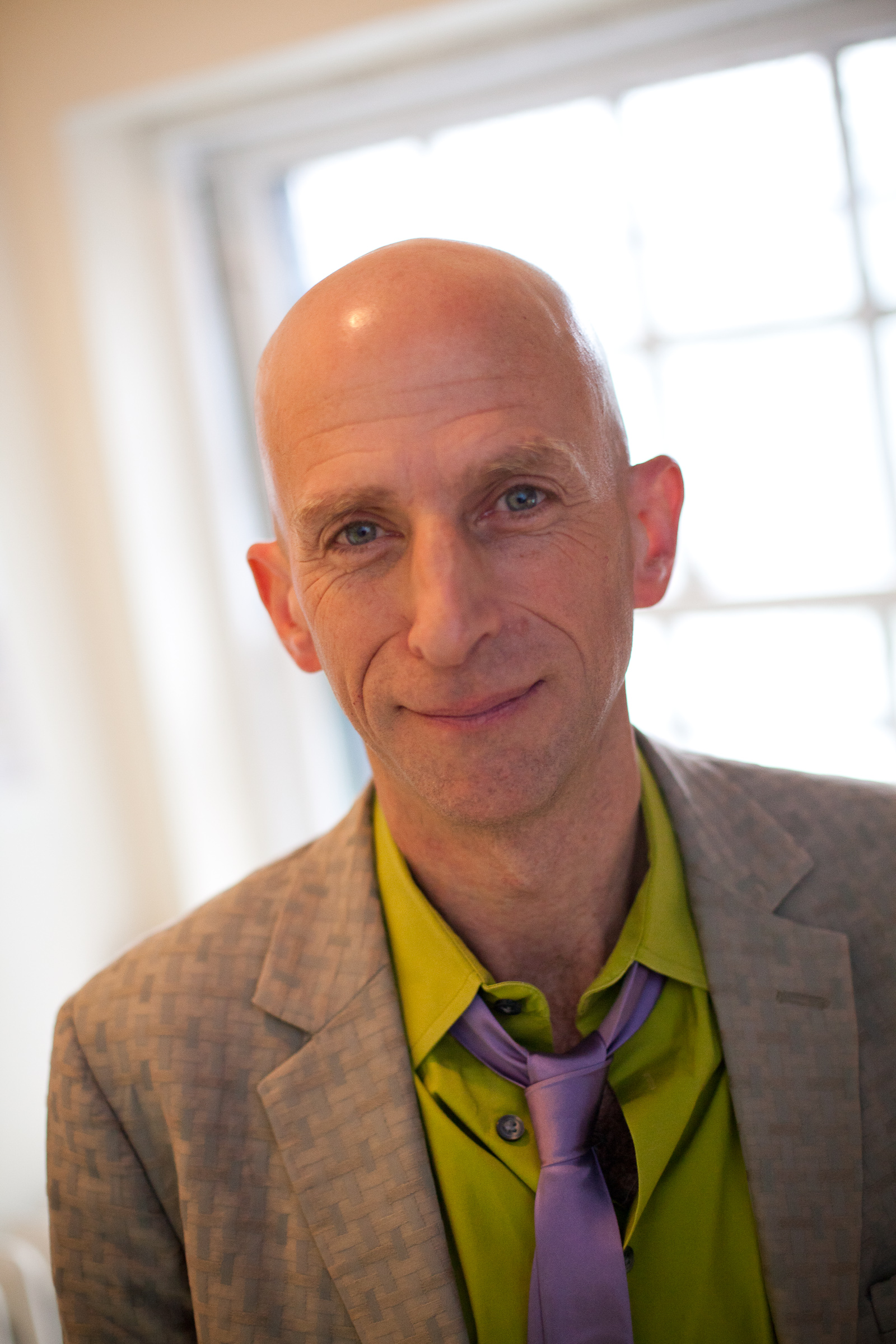
Robert Neuwirth

Robert Neuwirth is an American journalist, author, and investigative reporter. He wrote Shadow Cities: A Billion Squatters, A New Urban World, a book describing his experiences living in squatter communities in Nairobi, Rio de Janeiro, Istanbul and Mumbai. His articles have appeared in The New York Times, The Washington Post, Forbes, The Nation, and Newsday. His second book, Stealth of Nations: The Global Rise of the Informal Economy, was published in 2011. In this book Neuwirth joins globe-trotting Nigerians who sell Chinese cell phones and laid-off San Franciscans who use Twitter to market street food and learns that the people who work in informal economies are entrepreneurs who provide essential services and crucial employment.

== Education and career ==
Neuwirth studied philosophy in college. He began his career as a community organizer.
