= Parada de Lucas =

- Neighbourhood
- Location in Rio de Janeiro
- Coordinates: 22°48′55″S 43°18′07″W
- Country: Brazil
- State: Rio de Janeiro (RJ)
- Municipality/City: Rio de Janeiro
- Zone: North Zone

Population (2010)
  - Total: 23,923

Parada de Lucas is a lower-class neighbourhood in the North Zone of Rio de Janeiro, Brazil.
