= Amigos dos Amigos =

- Founding location: Rio de Janeiro, Brazil
- Years active: 1998–present
- Territory: Rocinha, various neighborhoods of Rio
- Ethnicity: Brazilians
- Membership: 300
- Activities: Murder, drug trafficking, extortion, prostitution, illegal gambling, human trafficking, kidnapping
- Allies: Bonde dos 40
- Rivals: Comando Vermelho, Terceiro Comando Puro, Brazilian militias

Amigos dos Amigos (ADA, Portuguese for Friends of Friends) is a criminal organization that operates in the Brazilian city of Rio de Janeiro. It was started up in 1998 when a member of Comando Vermelho was expelled from the organization for ordering the murder of another member. The gang's main rivals are Comando Vermelho and Terceiro Comando Puro. ADA controls many drug selling points in the North and West zones.

Between 2004 and 2017, ADA controlled Rocinha, the largest favela in Rio de Janeiro, along with many other smaller favelas. With the assassination of the gang leader Bem-Te-Vi in 2005 by police, there was a renewed wave of violence as gangs fought for control over favelas previously controlled by ADA.

ADA are thought to wield significant social power in the communities they control, winning support through handouts, throwing parties, and providing some services, while their rivals, the Red Command, imposes itself more through violence.

The gang made global headlines in October 2009 when a police helicopter crashed over Morro dos Macacos favela, which is a major Amigos dos Amigos stronghold. The helicopter pilot was shot and lost control of his aircraft, killing two.

== See also ==
- Crime in Brazil
- List of criminal gangs in Brazil
