= 2022 in Brazil =

Events in the year 2022 in Brazil.

== Incumbents ==
=== Federal government ===
- President: Jair Bolsonaro
- Vice President: Hamilton Mourão

=== Governors ===
- Acre: Gladson Cameli
- Alagoas: Renan Filho
- Amapá: Waldez Góes
- Amazonas: Wilson Lima
- Bahia: Rui Costa
- Ceará: Camilo Santana
- Espírito Santo: Renato Casagrande
- Federal District: Ibaneis Rocha
- Goiás: Ronaldo Caiado
- Maranhão: Flávio Dino
- Mato Grosso: Mauro Mendes
- Mato Grosso do Sul: Reinaldo Azambuja
- Minas Gerais: Romeu Zema
- Pará: Helder Barbalho
- Paraíba: João Azevêdo
- Paraná: Ratinho Júnior
- Pernambuco: Paulo Câmara
- Piauí: Wellington Dias
- Rio de Janeiro:
  - Wilson Witzel (until 30 April)
  - Cláudio Castro (starting 30 April)
- Rio Grande do Norte: Fátima Bezerra
- Rio Grande do Sul: Eduardo Leite
- Rondônia: Marcos Rocha
- Roraima: Antonio Denarium
- Santa Catarina: Carlos Moisés
- São Paulo: João Doria
- Sergipe: Belivaldo Chagas
- Tocantins: Mauro Carlesse

=== Vice governors ===
- Acre: Wherles Fernandes da Rocha
- Alagoas: José Luciano Barbosa da Silva
- Amapá: Jaime Domingues Nunes
- Amazonas: Carlos Alberto Souza de Almeida Filho
- Bahia: João Leão
- Ceará: Izolda Cela
- Espírito Santo: Jacqueline Moraes da Silva
- Goiás: Lincoln Graziane Pereira da Rocha
- Maranhão: Carlos Brandão
- Mato Grosso: Otaviano Olavo Pivetta
- Mato Grosso do Sul: Murilo Zauith
- Minas Gerais: Paulo Brant
- Pará:
  - Lúcio Dutra Vale (until 26 April)
  - Vacant (starting 26 April)
- Paraíba: Lígia Feliciano
- Paraná: Darci Piana
- Pernambuco: Luciana Barbosa de Oliveira Santos
- Piaui: Regina Sousa
- Rio de Janeiro:
  - Cláudio Castro (until 30 April)
  - Vacant (starting 30 April)
- Rio Grande do Norte: Antenor Roberto
- Rio Grande do Sul: Ranolfo Vieira Júnior
- Rondônia: José Atílio Salazar Martins
- Roraima: Frutuoso Lins Cavalcante Neto
- Santa Catarina: Daniela Cristina Reinehr
- São Paulo: Rodrigo Garcia
- Sergipe: Eliane Aquino Custódio
- Tocantins: Wanderlei Barbosa

== Events ==
=== January ===
- January 4: Mayor of Rio de Janeiro, Eduardo Paes, announces the cancellation of the city's street carnival.
- January 6: Due to the COVID-19 pandemic, São Paulo's street carnival is canceled by the city hall.
- January 8:
  - A dike at the Pau Branco Mine overflows in Nova Lima, due to excessive rain. Water reserved by the structure cuts off BR-040 (connecting Belo Horizonte to Rio de Janeiro) and damages vehicles on the highway.
  - A rockfall from a canyon hits four boats with tourists who were strolling on Lake Furnas in Capitólio (southwest of Minas Gerais), leaving ten dead and 32 injured.
- January 13: A landslide destroys a 19th century mansion and a property where a warehouse operated in Morro da Forca, in the historic center of Ouro Preto, Minas Gerais.
- January 19: Footballer Robinho is ultimately sentenced to 9 years in prison for rape in Italy.
- January 20: Brazilian drug regulator Anvisa approves the use of the Sinovac Coronavac vaccine for children between the ages of 6 and 11 years.
- January 24:
  - Two men invade the Manaus aero club and set fire to an IBAMA helicopter that was parked there.
  - Congolese immigrant Moïse Kabagambe is murdered by three men in Barra da Tijuca, Rio de Janeiro.
- January 28-February 3: A series of floods and landslides kill 28 people.

=== February ===
- February 1: A construction accident on Line 6-Orange of the São Paulo Metro causes a crater to open on Marginal Tietê towards Rodovia Ayrton Senna. The rupture of a sewer gallery is said to have caused the accident.
- February 2: Grocery worker Durval Teófilo Filho was mistakenly murdered by a neighbor in São Gonçalo, Rio de Janeiro.
- February 5: Protests in memory of Moïse Kabagambe take place in several Brazilian capitals and at the Brazilian embassy in Berlin, Germany. The protests denounce racism and xenophobia, as well as calling for the impeachment of President Jair Bolsonaro.
- February 13: The centenary of Modern Art Week in Brazil is celebrated.
- February 15: Heavy rains cause flooding and landslides in Petrópolis, resulting in parts of the city being destroyed.
- February 24: A fire hits a building near the FIESP on Avenida Paulista. There were no injuries.
- February 25: At the UN Security Council, Brazil and 10 other countries vote in favor of the resolution condemning Russia's invasion of Ukraine.

=== March ===
- March 11: Mauro Carlesse, who was removed as governor of Tocantins, officially resigns from his position. Acting governor Wanderlei Barbosa (since October 2021), is sworn in permanently.
- March 18: The Telegram application is blocked in Brazil by decision of Supreme Federal Court minister Alexandre de Moraes.
- March 21: New storms hit Petrópolis, mountainous region of Rio de Janeiro. At least 5 people died and another 3 are missing.
- March 25: Singer Anitta becomes the first Brazilian artist to reach first place in the global ranking on the Spotify platform, with her hit single Envolver.
- March 25-March 27: The ninth edition of Lollapalooza Brasil is held.
- March 30: Police move in to disperse a notorious drug market in São Paulo.

=== April ===
- April 1:
  - The only children's television program shown on free-to-air television, Bom Dia & Cia comes to an end after 28 years on the air.
  - Heavy rain causes floods and landslides in Rio de Janeiro; and municipalities in Costa Verde and Baixada Fluminense.
- April 8: A bull storms into the stands of a rodeo in Patrocínio, Minas Gerais, causing 16 injuries.
- April 10: Christ the Protector, a new statue of Jesus Christ is constructed in Encantado, Rio Grande do Sul. It is 5m taller than the Christ the Redeemer statue in Rio de Janeiro
- April 11: A helicopter crashes during a training flight in Contagem, Minas Gerais. Both pilot and student who were on the aircraft, were rescued.
- April 20: Federal deputy Daniel Silveira (PTB/RJ) is sentenced by the STF to 8 years and 9 months in prison and the loss of political rights for encouraging undemocratic acts.
- April 21:
  - A three-story building collapses in Vila Velha (Greater Vitória area), killing three people from the same family.
  - President Jair Bolsonaro issues a pardon to Daniel Silveira, after being convicted by the Supreme Federal Court.

=== May ===
- May 7: A bus accident on the Régis Bittencourt Highway (near Miracatu), kills singer Aleksandro, from the duo Conrado & Aleksandro, as well as five other band members.
- May 11: A plane carrying parachutists makes an emergency landing in the rural area of Boituva. Two people are confirmed dead, with seven others injured.
- May 16: Paulo Cupertino, accused of killing actor Rafael Miguel and his parents in 2019, is arrested by the São Paulo Civil Police after three years on the run.
- May 17: Unanimously, the Legislative Assembly of São Paulo votes on removing the mandate of Arthur do Val (UNIÃO) for breach of parliamentary decorum. The former deputy was denounced in March after private audios were leaked to the public, where he made sexually explicit comments towards Ukrainian women refugees while on a visit to a refugee camp during the Russian invasion.
- May 24: A police operation in Vila Cruzeiro, Rio de Janeiro, leaves at least 23 people dead.
- May 25: A man named Genivaldo de Jesus, is tortured and murdered during a police raid in Umbaúba, Sergipe. Agents used a Federal Highway Police vehicle as an improvised gas chamber and trapped the victim in the trunk.
- May 27: Heavy rains cause flooding and landslides in municipalities in Greater Recife, leaving at least 129 people dead.

=== June ===
- June 5: Indigenist Bruno Pereira and British journalist Dom Phillips are murdered during a boat trip through the Vale do Javari, the second-largest indigenous area in Brazil.
- June 6: The search begins for the whereabouts of indigenist Bruno Araújo Pereira and English journalist Dom Phillips, who disappeared while traveling to Atalaia do Norte, Amazonas.
- June 7: A 6.5 magnitude earthquake hits the border between Acre and Peru.
- June 8: In São Paulo, the first case of monkeypox in Brazil is confirmed. The patient is a 41-year-old man who traveled to Spain.
- June 15: Both Bruno Pereira and Dom Phillips are confirmed to have been murdered. Amarildo da Costa de Oliveira confessed to committing the crime, after having been arrested by the Federal Police, along with his brother.
- June 21: A plane carrying footballer Neymar Jr. and his family make an emergency landing in Boa Vista, Roraima, after a problem with the windshield. No one was injured.
- June 22: Former Minister of Education, Milton Ribeiro, is arrested by the Federal Police in an operation investigating embezzlement of funds at the MEC.
- June 25:
  - A small plane crashes on a private farm in Salto de Pirapora, killing three people.
  - Shootings occur after attempted robberies at shopping malls in Rio de Janeiro and Campinas, São Paulo. In Rio de Janeiro, a security guard was killed and in Campinas, a suspect died and two security guards were shot.
- June 29: Pedro Guimarães resigns as president of Caixa Econômica Federal following allegations of moral and sexual harassment against female employees.

=== July ===
- July 4:
  - Heavy rain causes flooding in at least 50 municipalities in Alagoas.
  - A school bus accident leaves 25 children injured and 1 deceased in Treviso, Santa Catarina.
- July 5: Daniella Marques takes office as president of Caixa Econômica Federal.
- July 6: Brasília becomes the first city in Brazil to rollout the 5G network.
- July 9: Marcelo Aloizio de Arruda, a municipal guard and leader of the Workers' Party, is murdered during his birthday party in Foz do Iguaçu, Paraná. Jorge José da Rocha Guaranho, a federal police officer, shot and killed Arruda, after breaking into the party site shouting slogans in favor of President Jair Bolsonaro.
- July 10: A fire hits a 10-story commercial building in the Rua 25 de Março region, in São Paulo.
- July 11: An anesthesiologist named Giovanni Quintella Bezerra is arrested red-handed after being filmed raping a woman during childbirth in São João de Meriti, Rio de Janeiro.
- July 21: At least 17 people are shot dead during a police operation in Complexo do Alemão, Rio de Janeiro.
- July 22: Red Bull Bragantino central defender Renan is arrested after being involved in a car accident on Rodovia Alkindar Monteiro Junqueira (between Itatiba and Bragança Paulista), which caused the death of a motorcyclist.
- July 24: A major explosion occurs due to a gas leak, leaving 4 people injured in the district of Água Fria, the North Zone of Recife, Pernambuco.

=== August ===
- August 1: Start of the 2022 Census.
- August 16:
  - The electoral campaign for the general election begins.
  - Alexandre de Moraes takes office as the 55th president of the Superior Electoral Court.
- August 18: By 48 votes to 2, the Rio de Janeiro City Council revokes the mandate of councilor Gabriel Monteiro (PL) for breach of parliamentary decorum. This is in response to accusations against Monteiro for sexual harassment against former advisors; filming graphic content with minors and homeless people; and rape.

=== September ===
- September 6: After almost nine years of renovation, the Ipiranga Museum reopens in São Paulo.
- September 8: A clandestine vessel sinks near Cotijuba Island, Pará, leaving 22 people dead.
- September 15: Actor José Dumont is arrested on suspicion of storing child pornography and for allegations of sexual abuse towards a 12-year-old.

=== October ===
- October 2: First round of general elections. For President, candidates Luiz Inácio Lula da Silva (PT) and Jair Bolsonaro (PL) go to the second round.
- October 4: A toxic gas leak kills a person and leaves more than a thousand temporarily homeless in 8 neighborhoods of Pontal in São Paulo.
- October 5: An armed 15-year-old boy shoots three students at a public school in Sobral, Ceará. Two victims were discharged, while the third died four days later.
- October 9: An accident involving a small plane causes the runway at Congonhas Airport to be closed for 9 hours and the cancellation of 140 flights in 15 states and the Federal District.
- October 11: Paulo Dantas, governor of Alagoas, is removed from office by the Superior Court of Justice after being the target of an investigation from the Federal Police and the Federal Public Ministry on alleged embezzlement within the state's Legislative Assembly. Vice-governor José Wanderley Neto takes office on an interim basis.
- October 17: The Civil Police of Rio Grande do Sul open an investigation on racist offenses against singer Seu Jorge during his performance in Porto Alegre.
- October 19: A helicopter crashes near a residential area in Parque da Rocinha, São Paulo, causing two injuries.
- October 23: Former deputy Roberto Jefferson is arrested after throwing a grenade and injuring two Federal Police agents who went to his home in Comendador Levy Gasparian, Rio de Janeiro. The agents went to serve an arrest warrant from the Supreme Federal Court against him after he recorded a video of him insulting court minister Carmen Lúcia. Jefferson surrendered to police after resisting arrest for around eight hours.
- October 27: Federal Highway Police officer Bruno Vanzan Nunes was killed while being robbed in a wave of violence against security officers. His death was the 45th that year of officers.
- October 30: Brazilians elect Luiz Inácio Lula da Silva of the Workers' Party as president, with 50.9% of the vote, in the second round of the presidential election. This makes him the first person to defeat an incumbent running for a second term, the first person to run for a third non-consecutive term, and the oldest person to assume the office of president, at the age of 77.
- October 31:
  - In protest against Lula's victory in the second round of the presidential election, truck drivers block highways in 23 states.
  - Four CEASA stores catch fire in Irajá, Rio de Janeiro.

=== November ===
- November 7: Former Rio de Janeiro councilor Gabriel Monteiro is arrested on charges of rape.
- November 13:
  - After a week trial, the 3rd Criminal Court of Niterói sentences former federal deputy and pastor Flordelis to 50 years and 28 days in prison for triple homicide, attempted double homicide, use of a false document, and armed criminal association for the murder of her husband, Pastor Anderson do Carmo.
  - Singer Milton Nascimento performs his final show at the Estádio do Mineirão, in Belo Horizonte.
- November 14: A drifting ship hits one of the pillars of the Rio-Niterói Bridge, causing the road to be closed for over 3 hours.
- November 24: The mayor of the municipality Lajeado do Bugre in Rio Grande do Sul, Roberto Maciel Santos, is shot dead inside the city hall.
- November 25: A shooting spree occurs at two schools in Aracruz, Espírito Santo, killing three people and injuring 13 others. The suspect, a 16-year-old boy, is arrested approximately four hours later.

=== December ===
- December 5: Heavy rains hit municipalities in eight states, causing floods and landslides.
- December 12: Bolsonaro supporters carry out vandalism attacks and attempt to invade the Federal Police headquarters in Brasília.
- December 19:
  - By 6 votes to 5, the Federal Supreme Court declares the secret budget unconstitutional.
  - After 6 years and 1 month, the former governor of Rio de Janeiro Sérgio Cabral Filho leaves jail to serve house arrest. This is after the second panel of the STF decides to release him, as they understand that there was no final conviction.

== Deaths ==
=== January ===
- January 20 - Elza Soares (born 1930), samba singer
- January 23 - Maiquel Falcão (born 1981), mixed martial artist
- January 24 - Olavo de Carvalho (born 1947), polemicist and philosopher
- January 26 - Ludmila Ferber (born 1965), Christian singer

=== February ===
- February 1 - Isaac Bardavid (born 1931), actor
- February 15 - Arnaldo Jabor (born 1940), film director and producer

=== March ===
- March 6 - Geraldo Sarno (born 1938), filmmaker
- March 11 - Sandra Cavalcanti (born 1925), politician

=== April ===
- April 3 - Lygia Fagundes Telles (born 1918), writer
- April 7 - Garibaldi Alves (born 1923), politician
- April 15 - Newton Cruz (born 1924), division general in the Brazilian army
- April 28 - Mendes Thame (born 1946), politician

=== May ===
- May 14 - Breno Silveira (born 1964), filmmaker
- May 23 - Wendell (born 1947), footballer
- May 29 - Antônio Augusto Cançado Trindade (born 1947), jurist
- May 30 - Milton Gonçalves (born 1933), actor

=== June ===
- June 3 - José de Abreu (born 1944), politician
- June 18 - Ilka Soares (born 1932), actress and model
- June 22 -
  - Marilu Bueno (born 1940), actress
  - Danuza Leão (born 1933), writer

=== July ===
- July 3 - Sérgio Paulo Rouanet (born 1934), diplomat and philosopher
- July 4 - Cláudio Hummes (born 1934), Roman Catholic cardinal, archbishop of Fortaleza (1996–1998) and São Paulo (1998–2006), prefect for the Clergy (2006–2010)
- July 9 - Wanderley Vallim (born 1936), entrepreneur and politician, governor of the Federal District (1990–1991)
- July 10 - Ermano Batista Filho (born 1937), lawyer and politician, Minas Gerais MLA (1991–2007)
- July 15 - Luiz of Orléans-Braganza (born 1938), disputed head of the imperial family (since 1981).
- July 19 - Eunice Durham (born 1932), anthropologist

=== August ===
- August 5 - Jô Soares (born 1938), comedian and talk show host
- August 7 - Leandro Lo (born 1989), Brazilian jiu-jitsu black belt competitor
- August 17 - Armindo Antônio Ranzolin (born 1937), sports journalist
- August 20 - Cláudia Jimenez (born 1958), actress

=== September ===
- September 7 - Emanoel Araújo (born 1940), artist and museologist
- September 28 - João de Aquino (born 1945), guitarist and composer

=== October ===
- October 2 - Éder Jofre (born 1936), professional boxer
- October 17 - Angelo Venosa (born 1954), sculptor

=== November ===
- November 4 - Paulo Jobim (born 1950), singer and son of Tom Jobim
- November 9 -
  - Rolando Boldrin (born 1936), television presenter and actor
  - Gal Costa (born 1945), singer
- November 10 - Roberto Guilherme (born 1938), actor
- November 16 - Isabel Salgado (born 1960), volleyball player and coach
- November 22 - Erasmo Carlos (born 1941), singer
- November 28 - Gilson Dipp (born 1944), jurist and magistrate

=== December ===
- December 6 - Edino Krieger (born 1928), composer
- December 12 - Jonas Abib (born 1936), Catholic priest
- December 17 - Nélida Piñon (born 1937), author and professor
- December 29 - Edson "Pelé" Arantes (born 1940), football player

== See also ==
- COVID-19 pandemic in South America
- Mercosur
- Organization of American States
- Organization of Ibero-American States
- Community of Portuguese Language Countries
