= Ascensão =

Studio album by Black Pantera
- Released: March 11, 2022
- Recorded: October 2020
- Studio: Tambor Studio (Rio de Janeiro)
- Genre: Thrash metal, hardcore punk
- Length: 38:43
- Language: Portuguese
- Label: Deckdisc
- Producer: Rafael Ramos, Black Pantera

Black Pantera chronology
Agressão (2018)	Ascensão (2022)

Singles from Ascensão
- 1. "Padrão É o Caralho" Released: 21 January 2022; 2. "Fogo nos Racistas" Released: 19 February 2022

Ascensão is the third album by Brazilian thrash metal band Black Pantera, released on 11 March 2022 via Deckdisc and produced by Rafael Ramos and the band members.

Recorded over the course of 13 days of October 2020 at Tambor studio in Rio de Janeiro, the album was already ready one year before March 2022, but its release was postponed due to the COVID-19 pandemic.

As with previous albums, the band discusses racism issues in the lyrics. In an interview shortly before the album's release, the members said it would be possible to write a whole album every day with all the racism and intolerance episodes that take place in Brazil, citing the murders of Durval Teófilo Filho and of Moïse Kabagambe as examples.

The album features Rodrigo Lima (Dead Fish) on "Dia do Fogo", a song criticizing Jair Bolsonaro's rule's policies towards the Amazon, and Tuyo on "Estandarte", an anti-homophobia song.

== Concept ==
=== Cover and title ===
The cover is a picture by Victor Balde taken in November 2019 and depicting Ana Francisco and Carolina Antônio, two women from Meconta, Mozambique, holding machetes, holding hands and protecting a child. The image is part of the collection "Lute como uma moçambicana" (Fight like a Mozambican woman), by the brand Com Respeito, and is inspired by the works of Giovanni Marrozzini. Deckdisc acquired the rights of the picture from Balde, who gave all proceedings to the depicted pair.

The title that was originally thought was Ascensão do Império Preto (Rise of the Black Empire), but the band shortened it to Ascensão (Rise) because they felt the previous name excluded other victims of prejudice, such as women and the LGBTQIA+ population.

According to bassist Charles da Gama, Ascensão "speaks of many matters and of the rise not only of the black people, but the rise of any person that wants to relate, regardless of skin color, gender, religion, of the rise of all people who are really being oppressed in Brazil and in the world over".

== Promotion ==
The album title and cover were announced on 17 January 2022, the same date on which they announced their first single, "Padrão É o Caralho". It and its video were released on 21 January 2022. Its lyrics begin with the verses "A coisa tá linda / A coisa tá preta" ("Things are beautiful / Things are black"), which challenge the use of the word "black" in Portuguese as a synonym of "ugly" or "bad" in the idiom "things are black".

The second single and video, "Fogo nos Racistas", came out on 19 February 2022. The lyrics reference figures such as Django Unchained, Luís Gama and Ogum. The video has a cameo of Madalena "Madá" Gordiano, a woman from Minas Gerais who was enslaved for 38 years, since she was 9 years old until December 2020, when she was set free.

On 13 March, the band did a show to celebrate the album's release in a public square in Uberaba, their hometown.

== Critical reception ==
Professional ratings
Review scores
Source	Rating
Cultura Sem Censura	10

Anderson Silva, from Cultura Sem Censura, praised tracks such as "Mosha", "Padrão É o Caralho", "Não Fode o Meu Rolê" and "Revolução É o Caos" and concluded his analysis saying that the three members "deserve to be more and more listened and worshiped as the foundations of the new Brazilian rock".

== Track listing ==
Ascensão track listing
No.	Title	Length
1.	"Mosha"	2:43
2.	"Padrão É o Caralho" (Pattern My Ass)	3:08
3.	"Delírio Coletivo" (Collective Delirium)	3:07
4.	"Fogo nos Racistas" (Fire on the Racists)	3:39
5.	"Não Fode o Meu Rolê" (Don't Fuck Up My Nigh Out)	2:53
6.	"Revolução É o Caos" (Revolution Is Chaos)	3:42
7.	"Anti Vida" (Anti Life)	3:01
8.	"Dia do Fogo" (Fire Day (featuring Rodrigo Lima))	2:39
9.	"Evilcred"	3:34
10.	"A Besta" (The Beast)	3:15
11.	"Eles Que Lutem" (Let Them Fight)	3:07
12.	"Estandarte" (Banner (featuring Tuyo))	3:55
Total length:		38:43

== Personnel ==
- Charles Gama – guitar, vocals
- Chaene da Gama – bass
- Rodrigo "Pancho" Augusto – drums
