= Italian language in Brazil =

The Italian language in Brazil has been widespread since the second half of the 19th century, particularly due to Italian emigration to Brazil. Today there are an estimated 26 million descendants of Italians residing in the country; among them, Italian is estimated to be spoken as a first language by about 50,000 people. On the other hand, there were 407,924 Italian citizens residing in Brazil in 2013. In the state of Rio Grande do Sul, a Venetian linguistic island is still active, whose language is called talian (or vêneto brasileiro). Italian is also being learned as a foreign language in Brazil by tens of thousands of students a year, partly due to the descendants of immigrants gradually recovering their origins.

In Brazil, the Italian language is co-official in the municipalities of Encantado (Rio Grande do Sul), José Boiteux (Santa Catarina), Santa Tereza (Espírito Santo), Santo Ângelo (Rio Grande do Sul), São Bento do Sul (Santa Catarina) and Venda Nova do Imigrante (Espírito Santo).

== The language of Italian emigration ==
=== History ===
Brazil is the third-largest country in the Americas in terms of the number of Italian immigrants received in the period 1876-1990; the migratory flow peaked in the period 1886-1895, with 503,599 expatriates; the influx of Italians remained substantial in the period prior to World War I (expatriates were 450,423 and 196, respectively. 699 in the decades 1896-1905 and 1906-1915); the period between the two wars saw a gradual reduction of Italian emigration to Brazil; after the interruption of the migratory flow during World War II, which saw Italy and Brazil on opposite sides, there was a new, rather substantial wave in the postwar period (there were 133,231 expatriates in the period 1946-1990). The total number of Italians who emigrated to Brazil between 1876 and 1990 is 1,447,356.

Italian immigration particularly affected the south of the country; even today, the population of Italian origin reaches 65 percent in the southern states of Rio Grande do Sul, Santa Catarina, and Espirito Santo (half of which is of Venetian origin). The city of São Paulo is estimated to be the largest Italian urban hub in the world, with about 15 million inhabitants of Italian origin. In the northeastern part of Rio Grande do Sul an authentic Região Colonial Italiana was born. Alongside Italian immigration, the region attracted to itself numerous immigrants from Germany; in addition to Brazilian Portuguese, Italian was thus exposed to contact with German, itself a language of immigration. The different waves of migration were characterized by different regional origins: emigrants of northern origin (from Veneto, Trentino, Friuli) were prevalent at the end of the nineteenth century, while with the new century, arrivals from southern Italy (particularly Campania) prevailed.

The literacy rate of emigrants also varied greatly. Illiteracy was frequent in the first period of emigration, which was predominantly dialect-speaking. After World War II, on the other hand, the migratory flow was marked by a higher level of education, to which corresponded with a greater mastery of Italian. This condition was also brought about by the strong connection established between Italian emigration to Brazil and the presence in the country of large Italian industrial groups, particularly in the automotive and telecommunications sectors; this has led to seeing in the Italian language and culture a root capable of bringing an extra layer of value to entrepreneurial processes.

=== Characteristics of Italian communities ===
Italian emigration to Brazil was favored by the welcoming policies adopted by the South American country, which was willing to advance the ticket for the journey in order to receive labor for the colonization of its immense territory, still largely unexplored. It was therefore the most impoverished social strata that undertook the journey, thus becoming settlers who gradually replaced slaves in the fazendas (dating to 1888 the abolition of slavery through the Lei Áurea). The rural context favored the creation of self-sufficient Italian communities that were relatively isolated from the linguistic context of the country of arrival. Colonization of territories entrusted by the Brazilian government, concentrated mainly in the states of Paraná, Santa Catarina and Rio Grande do Sul, was the main choice by the Venetians and northern Italians in general.

The rural settlements thus tended to be linguistically conservative, in parallel with what is observed in the more conservative areas of Italian territory. Contributing to the preservation of the languages of origin was the isolation in enclaves, often characterized by endogamy and poor schooling, and also the establishment of much larger family groups than in the motherland, which reached as many as 170 members. As a result, numerous towns with Italian names were founded in the rural areas: in Rio Grande do Sul, Nova Bassano, Nova Pádua, Nova Treviso, Nova Vicenza (later to become Farroupilha) and Nova Trento (later to become Flores da Cunha) were founded; in the state of Espírito Santo, Nova Venécia was born; in the state of Santa Catarina one finds Nova Veneza and another Nova Trento, founded by immigrants of Trentino origin who still retain part of their native language.

More exposed to the pressure of Brazilian Portuguese were the urban contexts, which attracted Italian immigrants only later; rather than direct immigration, it was often the urbanization of settlers from the fazendas, attracted by the prospects of wealth offered by the modernization of large cities. São Paulo, which in 1920 had a population consisting of 50 percent immigrants of Italian origin, played a leading role in the phenomenon of language mixing, also by virtue of the stratification of different regional origins (Campania, Apulia, Veneto, Calabria). These conditions favored the use of the Italian language in associations and assemblies. Political participation of Italian-Brazilians, long limited due to low literacy rates, also began in the city.

The other major hub of urban settlement of Italian immigrants was Porto Alegre, where there were 41 Italian families as early as 1850; The Italian presence in the city resulted in 1877 in the founding of the Vittorio Emanuele II Society, which remained in operation until its dissolution decreed by the Brazilian government at the time of World War II. Deeply rooted in the city was from the end of the nineteenth century the Calabrian presence, with the predominance of immigrants from the province of Cosenza and in particular from the town of Morano Calabro; the Morano community long maintained its own well-characterized identity, strengthened by endogamous marriages and catalyzed by the cult of Our Lady of Mount Carmel, Morano's patron saint.

=== The education of immigrants ===
Brazil's school network suffered for a long time from a serious inefficiency, determined in part by the enormous size of the national territory, and in part by the tendency of disinterest shown since the origins of the Federal Republic for the education of the entire country. The education of Italian-Brazilians was therefore for a long time imparted by the immigrants themselves. The initiative of improvised institutors was soon associated with the foundation of Italian elementary schools, supported by associations, religious and private teachers as well as by irregular funding from the Italian government.

Particularly relevant was the role of the numerous Italian associations that were formed with patriotic, religious, cultural, and above all charitable and mutual aid purposes (there were 98 in 1896, 277 in 1908, and still 192 in 1923); These associations constantly maintained ties with the consular authorities, who were interested in maintaining the Italian language among the emigrants. Less linked to the preservation of national identity were the rural schools, on the other hand, whose purpose was more pragmatically to teach reading, writing and counting. It is uncertain whether Italian or a dialect prevailed in the teaching there; probably a mixture of the two languages was in use, not without some influence from Portuguese. The use of bilingual Italian-Portuguese texts, provided to emigrants by the Italian government, is also documented.

The success of the Italian schools depended essentially on being for a long time the only option available. In 1908 232 institutions were surveyed, rising to 396 in 1913; their number then fell to 329 in 1924 and 167 in 1930. This decrease was determined by the gradual strengthening of the network of public schools; the granting of funding to community schools (i.e., those run by non-state associations) was also tied to the teaching in Portuguese of history, geography and some other subjects. It was, moreover, the Italian settlers themselves, by then rooted in Portuguese soil, who were eager to learn the national language.

In the period of Getúlio Vargas's dictatorship (1930-1945), a campaign of forced nationalization began, hitting hard at ethnically based schools (Italian, German, etc.), kept alive only by the support of the respective European governments and religious bodies; with World War II, the study of Italian was banned (along with that of German and Japanese). After World War II, with funding from the Italian government having largely disappeared compared to the fascist era, public or religious Portuguese-language schools replaced ethnically based ones, leading to numerous protests and a high rate of school evasion; it was only from 1985 onward that space was given in public schools to languages other than Portuguese and English, so that Italian-Brazilians and other immigrant groups could learn to read and write the language of use in their community.

=== The emigration press ===
Italian immigrant communities gave rise to a large number of periodical publications; between 1875 and 1960 more than 500 newspapers (daily, weekly, fortnightly, monthly, and single issues) were surveyed, of which about 360 were concentrated in São Paulo State. These were either news sheets, abounding in news about the motherland and crime or society news, as well as humorous, literary, sports, and fashion newspapers, often with modest circulations and lasting less than a year. Their sustenance, rather than sales, relied on advertisements by compatriots. There were also a few newspapers with larger circulations, most notably the "Fanfulla" of São Paulo, which was born in 1893 and soon became the "unofficial mouthpiece of the Italian community in Brazil"; the paper was also read by Brazilians and with its 15,000 copies represented the city's second largest newspaper at the beginning of the 1910s. Today it survives as a bilingual weekly, the only significant exponent of the Italian press in the state of São Paulo.

Also still in operation is the "Correio Riograndense," founded in 1909 in Caxias do Sul under the title "La Libertà"; the following year the paper was transferred to Garibaldi, where it took the name "Il Colono"; in 1917 it was purchased by the Capuchins and became the "Staffetta Riograndense," to assume its current title in 1941. Until that date, the newspaper was edited in Italian, with a section in Portuguese and a column in a Venetian "enriched with Lombard expressions." It was on the very columns of the "Staffetta Riograndense" that the successful Vita e stória de Nanetto Pipetta nassuo in Itália e vegnudo in Mérica per catare la cucagna by the Capuchin friar Aquiles Bernardi saw the light between January 23, 1924 and February 18, 1925; the text is written in Talian, a Venetian koiné with influences from the Lombard and Portuguese languages. Even today the newspaper still represents the "voice of the so-called Taliàn identity."

The juxtaposition between writing in Italian and writing in dialect was not without political significance; writing in Italian was often related to the propaganda of patriotic and nationalistic ideals, while the use of dialect did not arise as a spontaneous initiative of dialect speakers (moreover, not at all accustomed to putting in writing their language of use), but rather by the initiative of some members of the clergy, who often used their works to spread anti-socialist ideas. Nanetto Pipetta's language reflected more Bernardi's native Vicentino than the variety spoken by Italo-Brazilians of the time.

=== Brazilian government policies ===
In the first period of its history, the government of independent (1822) and later republican (1889) Brazil showed little interest in the linguistic integration of the different components of the country's population; therefore, assimilationist policies were not promoted, unlike what was happening in Argentina; this circumstance favored the preservation of the language of origin by immigrants. The language spoken by the population was not surveyed in the first national censuses (1872, 1890, 1900, 1920); it was not until the 1940 census, the first conducted after the founding of the Instituto Brasileiro de Geografia e Estatística, that indications of Portuguese proficiency and the language spoken in the household were collected.

The census showed that Italian was spoken by 458,000 people, among whom the large group was Brazilians of at least three generations (285,000), descendants of the Italians who came with the first wave of immigration; they were followed by second (120,000) and first generation Brazilians (53,000). Italian speakers thus emerged as the country's second largest linguistic minority (not counting Amerindian languages), after German speakers (644,000) and before Japanese (193,000) and Spanish speakers (74,500). The census also ascertained that out of the 24,603 Italo-Brazilians ("imigrados, nacionais ou ex-nacionais da Itália") in the state of Rio Grande do Sul, 13,349 (54.26 percent) habitually spoke Italian; much lower is the percentage for the state of São Paulo, demonstrating the difference between rural and metropolitan contexts (out of 234,550 Italo-Brazilians, 30,259 spoke Italian, corresponding to 12.90 percent). The overall percentage of Italian-Brazilians still preferentially speaking Italian was 16.19 percent: this was the lowest share among the main immigrant communities in Brazil, as shown in the table below:

Land of origin of foreigners and naturalized Brazilians	Percentage of immigrants preferentially speaking their native language
Japanese	84,71
Germans	57,71
Russians	52,78
Poles	47,75
Austrians	42,18
Spaniards	20,57
Italians	16,19

The distribution of the data naturally reflects the greater proximity of Italian and Spanish to Portuguese than to non-Romance (German, Russian, Polish) or non-Indo-European (Japanese) languages.

The 1940 census is particularly significant because the data were collected before Brazil intervened in World War II on the side of the Allies (1942), thus initiating a campaign of forced assimilation of minorities (called Campanha de Nacionalização). It is believed, therefore, that the responses to the census surveys were largely sincere, in that they were not yet conditioned by the need to conceal their linguistic identity. Things would be different in 1950, when minorities of Italian, German and Japanese descent, following the defeat of their respective countries of origin and the nationalization campaign, generally preferred to deny knowledge of languages other than Portuguese.

The forced assimilation of minorities implemented under the Estado Novo regime of Getúlio Vargas went first through the "nationalization of teaching"; thus there was the nationalization of "community" schools (that is, those run by non-state associations) and the prohibition of teaching in languages other than Portuguese. Publication of works in the languages of the enemy was banned on pain of immediate imprisonment; this led to the suppression of numerous newspapers in German and Italian. The concept of "language crime" (crime idiomático) was born; the persecution of language minorities peaked between 1941 and 1945, leading to the imprisonment of thousands of people caught speaking their mother tongue.

Concentration camps, known as "confinement areas," were created in the state of Santa Catarina, where descendants of immigrants who continued to speak their native language, among others, were imprisoned. In 1942 in the city of Blumenau, in the same state, 31 percent of prisoners were in jail for speaking a foreign language; this share corresponded to 1.5 percent of the municipality's total population. In the same year, the army intervened in the city, with the aim of "teaching Santa Catarina people to be Brazilian." Attempts were also made to induce children to denounce parents who spoke a language other than Portuguese at home.

The consequence of these repressions was the disappearance of much of the cultural production in the Italian language. Only a small part of the suppressed newspapers was in fact printed again after the end of the Vargas regime; many continued their publications in Portuguese. The Italian language, in its dialectal varieties, survived mainly in rural communities, while in the big cities, as already noted, it only came back into use with the new wave of immigration after World War II.

=== The Italian language of immigrants in Brazilian literature ===
The strong Italian component present in the Brazilian population since the end of the nineteenth century has favored the entry of the figure of the Italian immigrant into the country's cultural production; in particular, the Italian presence still has a strong weight in the definition of the Paulista identity (the term ítalo-paulistas is used in this regard). Thus, a literary strand has emerged that has Italians of recent immigration as its undisputed protagonists, often well characterized also linguistically.

At the origins of the literary figure of the ítalo-brasileiro are the short stories of Brás, Bexiga and Barra Funda by the modernist writer Antônio de Alcântara Machado; the work, first published in 1927, has as its protagonists the so-called Italianinhos de São Paulo, that is, the Italian immigrants who lived in the Paulista capital and in particular in the three working-class neighborhoods that give the collection its name. Machado's intent is to make a portrait of the immigrants' daily experience, depicted in their difficult living conditions in a chronicle-like manner; the author writes in the preface:

Este livro não nasceu livro: nasceu jornal. Estes contos não nasceram contos: nasceram notícias. E este prefácio portanto também não nasceu prefácio: nasceu artigo de fundo. Brás, Bexiga e Barra Funda é o órgão dos ítalo-brasileiros de São Paulo.
This book wasn't born as a book: it was born as a newspaper. These short stories were not born as short stories: they were born as news. And this preface wasn't born as a preface either: it was born as a feature article. "Brás, Bexiga e Barra Funda" is the organ of the Italo-Brazilians of São Paulo.

The characteristic of Machado's novelas paulistanas is the adoption of a linguistic variety heavily influenced by Italian in both grammar and vocabulary, in imitation of the immigrants' language. Sometimes this leads to authentic passages in Italian, as in the following example (this is the reading aloud done by an immigrant of a news item from the "Fanfulla," the popular newspaper of the Italians of São Paulo):

La fulminante investita dei nostri bravi bersaglieri ha ridotto le posizioni nemiche in un vero amazzo di rovine. Nel campo di battaglia sono restati circa cento e novanta nemici. Dalla nostra parte abbiamo perduto due cavalli ed è rimasto ferito un bravo soldato, vero eroe che si à avventurato troppo nella conquista fatta da solo di una batteria nemica.
The fulminating charge of our good bersaglieri reduced the enemy positions to a veritable mist of ruins. About one hundred and ninety enemies remained in the battlefield. On our side we lost two horses and a good soldier was wounded, a true hero who ventured too far in the one-man capture of an enemy battery.

The same procedure was later adopted by Mário de Andrade in the collection Belasarte (1934), dedicated precisely to Machado. In both cases, it is not a realistic reproduction, but a linguistic pastiche in which "the use of the Italian language [...] insinuates itself into the fabric of the narrative in the same way that the immigrants were penetrating the urban fabric: sometimes distinguishing themselves from the context in an obvious way, at other times with interactions of subtle and varied nuances." It is thus a matter of "re-producing (producing again, and not just replicating) the phonetic, lexical, and phraseological adaptation of the Ítalo-Paulistanos"; this procedure does not respond to a principle of representational fidelity, but of effectiveness vis-à-vis the Brazilian audience, since often "these adaptations, while incorrect from a purely linguistic point of view, nevertheless turn out to be fully responsive to the stylistic intent, and, above all, recognizable to a Portuguese-speaking reader."

== Linguistic analysis ==
Within Italian-Brazilians, it is necessary to distinguish between Italophones and dialectophones. An Italian language that conforms to the standard, even if affected by consistent phenomena of linguistic erosion, characterizes the descendants of post-World War II immigrants and is concentrated particularly in the state of São Paulo. In addition, numerous dialect-speaking communities survive in Brazil; of particular relevance are the Venetian speakers concentrated in a linguistic island between Rio Grande do Sul and Santa Catarina, collectively designated by the term Talian.

=== The Italian language of immigrants in São Paulo ===
Studies carried out at the beginning of the 21st century on the spread of Italian among Italo-Brazilians in São Paulo revealed a clear divide between the two phases of Italian emigration to Brazil (before and after the break of World War II): knowledge of the Italian language has in fact been almost completely lost in the descendants of Italians of the first immigration, while a greater degree of preservation of the language of origin is found in those who came to Brazil in the second twentieth century. In this second phase, moreover, the higher level of education of the immigrants favored the maintenance of the use of Italian in the family and its propagation through teaching, in free courses and at the university, thus leading to a progressive recovery of the Italian language after the prohibitions imposed by the Estado Novo regime.

The maintenance of good active competence in the language of origin is conditioned by the possession of a good background, obtained through higher studies in the country of origin, and by the possibility of frequently practicing Italian in various registers and in environments open to up-to-date linguistic exchange. In people who arrived in Brazil in adulthood, deviations from the Italian grammatical norm mostly present themselves as momentary lapses. In this immigrant group, good linguistic competence is frequently combined with a conservative attitude toward the language of origin, through an attempt to separate its lexicon and grammar from those of the language of everyday use; this "tendency toward control and an ideal standard language" is particularly pronounced in older respondents. More deviant from the Italian norm, both in lexical and grammatical aspects, is the variety of language spoken by those who arrived in Brazil in childhood; maintaining the language of origin necessitates, in these cases, contact with the standard language through a period of formal study and through the practice of reading in Italian.

It can be estimated that at the end of the 20th century, the Italian language in São Paulo was fluently mastered by about a thousand people, able to produce utterances that had their main limitations "in terms of lexical property and richness"; at a lower level of proficiency, Italian had a few tens of thousands of speakers, who presented more interference of various kinds, while being able to "communicate in Italian with fluency and liveliness." In recent decades, the international diffusion of RAI broadcasts and the increase in Italian courses, which constitute an employment outlet for many of the latest generation of immigrants, have fostered a gradual increase in interest in learning Italian as a foreign language, particularly among Italian-Brazilians who wish to regain contact with their language of origin. Overall, Italian retains good visibility in São Paulo, including in the commercial sphere (particularly in the food, furniture, fashion, and luxury goods sectors), favored by the fact that "in Brazil the Italian name gives status and prestige."

==== Linguistic erosion ====
Between 1995 and 1998, a linguistic corpus relating to the Italian spoken by Italian immigrants who had been residing in São Paulo for at least 30 years was established at São Paulo State University to test the maintenance of the language of origin in those who had arrived in Brazil with the second wave of immigration, between 1945 and 1960. Respondents were chosen from among people who had good beginning proficiency in Italian, assured by having lived in Italy until adulthood and by holding a secondary school diploma (and often a college degree as well). On the basis of this and two subsequent corpora collected at the Federal University of Minas Gerais between 2004 and 2006 and between 2008 and 2009, the linguistic traits of Italian most susceptible to linguistic erosion in prolonged contact with Brazilian Portuguese were studied (meaning linguistic erosion as "a non-pathological loss in performance in one's native language.")

The main phenomena of linguistic erosion surveyed are as follows:

===== Lexicon =====
- frequency of semantic calques ("use of lexemes present in both languages with partially or totally different meanings"); sometimes these are "lexemes that have the function of discursive signals and therefore perform a pragmatic function in discourse" (e.g., violento e brutale as a function of superlative in una differenza violenta or una differenza brutale);
- indications of reduction of the source language lexicon and different semantic distribution; between two Italian synonyms, the one shared with Portuguese is markedly preferred over the other, sometimes in contrast to what happens in monolingual speakers (e.g., differente clearly prevails over diverso; the distribution of parlare and dire is remodeled on that of falar and dizer in Portuguese);
- presence of lexical calques (i.e., "lexemes exclusively Portuguese and phonomorphologically adapted to Italian"); however, this presence is very small, as "among related languages" it is "squeezed [...] between semantic calque, which is much more likely in the case of languages sharing the origin, and code-switching";
- deviations from standard Italian in the use of affixes; the phenomenon is not explained by Portuguese interference alone, but by a more complex set of factors (e.g., there is often substitution of Italian suffixes for others with higher productivity, even without a Portuguese model).

===== Morphosyntax =====
- gender changes of nouns on the Portuguese model (e.g., use of ordine in the feminine);
- influence of Portuguese in the use of the article in front of kinship and possessive nouns (il mio marito, mie zie, etc.), with dates (in millenovecentosessanta), in modified nominal syntagma (io vivo in città che ha il mare) or in other expressions; in some cases the omission or incorrect introduction of the article is not explained by the influence of Portuguese, but by a generic loss of linguistic competence (è stata dieci anni in Stati Uniti, come in Italia, in Brasile, etc.);
- errors in government; again, erosion is only partly explainable by second language interference;
- introduction of syntactic and textual connectives traced to Brazilian Portuguese (i.e., to which are attributed "pragmatic functions different from those of the same forms in Italian");

===== Syntax =====
- use of the gerund not compatible with Italian grammar (e.g., with a subject that is co-referent with the object: io ho avuto sempre cugini [...] lavorando ['che lavoravano'] a Montevideo).
- different position of adverbs (in particular, constant anteposition of sempre, anche, già to the verb and, in the case of periphrastic forms, to the auxiliary: una persona che sempre è stata ammalata; io anche pensavo; già io avevo trentacinque anni).
- the use of clitic pronouns declines sharply, particularly in immigrants who have lived in Brazil for a long time; exceptions are the ci attualizzante in esserci (an expression that tends to replace more specific terms as a result of lexical erosion) and the accusative pronoun as anaphoric of left-displaced constituents (a circumstance due to the greater incidence of thematizing structures in Portuguese than in Italian).
- Subject expression: Brazilian Portuguese is evolving toward a decreasing incidence of the null subject (pro-drop) and this seems to affect native Italian speakers who, after a long stay in Brazil, express the pronominal subject more frequently than the Italian standard.

===== Code-switching =====
- the use of Portuguese in an Italian linguistic context (code-switching) often concerns the insertion of discursive signals or locutions with a pragmatic function; this is called emblematic switching ("conscious use of single expressions of ethnic content and pragmatic function") in these cases.

From these investigations, it is understood that the effects of the exposure of native Italian speakers to contact with Brazilian Portuguese are not limited to the lexical and morphosyntactic domains, but also reach the area of syntax and pragmatics; in other words, they "affect a deeper level of the language, [...] that connected with information structure."

=== Dialects ===
The existence of Italian linguistic islands, predominantly dialect-speaking, within the Brazilian territory has allowed the preservation of linguistic varieties that have now disappeared from their context of origin; the tendency for peripheral areas to be preserved, which constitutes one of the laws of spatial linguistics formulated by Matteo Bartoli, has allowed dialectologists to "study, almost 'in vitro,' how dialectal Italian was spoken in the 19th century."

The language of the Região Colonial Italiana, and in particular the Italian dialects of the plateau of Caxias do Sul, were the subject of a survey in 1968 by Temistocle Franceschi and Antonio Cammelli; the two dialectologists submitted to some inhabitants of Conceição, a suburb of Caxias, the questionnaire previously used by Matteo Bartoli and Ugo Pellis for the Italian Linguistic Atlas. The language of the informants turned out to be a Venetian dialect of the "Vicentino" type; the Vicentine community of Caxias was flanked by a "Feltrina" (i.e., from the middle Piave Valley) community, more numerous but of lower social status. Franceschi also noted the presence in Caxias of numerous people able to speak Italian fluently, "which, moreover, was here the language of culture - in which books and periodicals were printed - before 'Lusitanian' imposed itself in the same capacity." The dialectologist also noted the important linguistic role of the local clergy, whose training was long entrusted to clergymen of Italian descent.

Between 1973 and 1974, Vitalina Frosi and Ciro Mioranza surveyed the dialect-speakers in 26 municipalities in the Caxias region; it turned out that 98.5 percent of them were either from Veneto (54 percent), Lombardy (33 percent), Trentino (7 percent) or Friuli (4.5 percent); among the Venetians, 32 percent were from Vicenza, compared to 30 percent from Belluno, 24 percent from Treviso and lower percentages from other provinces. This strong prevalence of speakers from a narrow area of the Veneto, corresponding to the region of Mount Grappa (which lies on the border between the three provinces) favored the creation of the dialectal koiné known as Talian.

In more recent times, the Neotrentino dialect of Nova Trento, in the state of Santa Catarina, and of Piracicaba, in the state of São Paulo, has been the subject of detailed linguistic studies. The presence of Trentino people in Brazil dates back to the time when the province of Trento was part of the Austro-Hungarian Empire; in fact, starting in 1870, Italian-speaking Trentino settlers were sent by the Habsburg Empire to populate the German colonies in Brazil, particularly in Blumenau, in the state of Santa Catarina.

In the rural areas of the state of Rio Grande do Sul there are also some Friulian-speaking communities; Friulian (furlan) is, however, perceived by speakers as clearly distinct from the dominant Venetian koiné (talian). Overseas Friulian varieties allow us to observe processes of phonological evolution that differ from those of the motherland.

A mixture of Italian and dialects, on the other hand, has been observed in the inhabitants of the Italian community of Pedrinhas Paulista, located in the state of São Paulo about 550 km from the capital. As of 1952, the city welcomed 236 immigrant families, of which 127 were still there in 1974. By the end of the 20th century, they mostly continued to speak in their respective dialects of origin in the domestic sphere, resorting instead to "an interlanguage of Italian, dialect, Portuguese, with local Italians but from other regions and with Italians visiting their city" and to "a simplified Brazilian Portuguese that is inadequate with Brazilians." This is, however, an exceptional case, since in the remaining territory of the state, the loss of the language of origin has been almost total.

=== Talian ===
The name Talian denotes a variety of the Venetian language spoken by about 500,000 people as a first language in 113 cities in the Brazilian states of Rio Grande do Sul and Santa Catarina. It is a Venetian-based language, with influences from other Italian dialects and Portuguese; Talian is not considered a Creole language, despite the high incidence of lexical borrowings from Portuguese, as "the grammar and lexicon remain fundamentally Venetian."

Talian exhibits "the typical features of a linguistic enclave"; In fact, the linguistic features of Talian depend on the different speakers from which the koiné originated (Venetian dialects, Lombard dialects, Brazilian Portuguese). The emergence of a dialectal koiné on a Venetian basis among Italian-Brazilians took place within the so-called "Italian Colonial Region" in the Northeast Rio Grande do Sul.

The Brazilian Venetian was subjected to persecutory measures under the Estado Novo regime, which greatly reduced its use, now essentially limited to the domestic sphere and to older speakers. Since the 1990s, however, it has been the focus of a wide-ranging popularization effort in order to ensure its preservation. Talian has also received numerous institutional recognitions, eventually becoming part of Brazil's cultural heritage (2014).

== Italian in Brazil as a foreign language ==
=== Diffusion through the media ===
The character of the Italian-Brazilian, well present in literature and theater, later arrived in cinema and then on television; thus it is common that in the popular novelas das oito, the telenovelas broadcast in prime time by Rede Globo, space is given to dialogues in Italian. There have been numerous stories about family conflicts in late 19th-century or early 20th-century Italy, often resolved in the emigration of one or more characters to the mirage of happiness represented by São Paulo, or about the bloody feuds among Italian immigrants in the fazendas. Brazilian audiences are thus frequently exposed to examples of "televised Italian," characterized not only by the introduction of idiomatic words and expressions, but sometimes also by the attempt to "'integrate' the grammar and syntax of the two languages," Italian jokes are delivered by Brazilian actors and subordinated to the viewers' need for understanding. The need to follow the tastes of the audience, however, often results in a certain stereotyping in linguistic representation, most evident in the predilection for immigrants of Neapolitan origin portrayed in a caricatured manner.

=== The study of Italian as a foreign language ===
Italian teaching in Brazilian schools

The teaching of Italian as a foreign language has been introduced as a compulsory subject in several Brazilian municipalities, listed below by state:

- Espírito Santo: Venda Nova do Imigrante
- Paraná: Francisco Beltrão
- Rio Grande do Sul: Antônio Prado
- Santa Catarina: Brusque; Criciúma
- São Paulo: Bragança Paulista.

Italian language learning, on the other hand, is optional in public schools in São Paulo and São José dos Campos In the state of São Paulo, the teaching of Italian has also been available since 1987 in the Centros de Estudo de Línguas attached to some secondary schools and since 1995 in several elementary schools.

Teaching of Italian in universities

Graduate courses in Italian language and literature are offered by the country's leading universities (including University of São Paulo and São Paulo State University, University of Brasília, Federal University of Rio de Janeiro, Federal University of Rio Grande do Sul).

Ciência sem Fronteiras - Itália project

In the years 2013 and 2014, the Brazilian government offered the opportunity to study Italian in Italy through the Ciência sem Fronteiras - Itália program; the Italian partner in the project was the ICoN consortium.

Italian courses funded by the Ministry of Foreign Affairs

The teaching of Italian by Italian Cultural Institutes Abroad (IICs) was the subject of the Italian 2000 survey, promoted by the Ministry of Foreign Affairs with the aim of assessing "the audiences and motivations of Italian diffused among foreigners." As for Brazil, only the São Paulo IIC responded, documenting a 63.1 percent increase in students of Italian between 1995 and 2000.

The survey was repeated ten years later; in the years 2009-2010, 3,112 students from Ministry of Foreign Affairs university lecturers in Brazil and more than 3,000 students from Italian courses organized by the IICs were surveyed. Among the motivations for learning, "personal and family reasons" emerged with an outstanding place in all of Latin America (37 percent, compared to 27 percent for "study" and "leisure and various interests" and 9 percent for "work"), particularly by virtue of "family of Italian origin." This figure is in line with the results of the survey conducted in São Paulo in the 1990s, which saw "reasons of origin" steadily standing alongside "reasons for study" in "almost all responses" (less relevance had "study for pleasure," however, and even less weight to "work-related reasons").

In the Statistical Yearbook of the Ministry of Foreign Affairs, data on students of Italian at IICs and those enrolled in Italian language and culture courses organized by the Ministry are released. Both figures have gradually declined, mainly due to the drastic decrease in the financial resources devolved by the Ministry and thus in the number of courses organized. The data for the years 2008-2013 can be summarized in the following table:

Year	Contributions to organizations and associations (Americas)	Italian language and culture courses	Students	Courses at IICs	IIC Students
2008	12.000.999	4.125	82.500	344	4.065
2009	7.643.585	2.817	43.859	334	4.141
2010	5.369.500	2.664	42.608	112	1.517
2011	5.367.370	3.046	53.185	122	1.548
2012	2.991.335	1.645	31.804	167	1.624
2013	3.634.671	1.255	22.695	206	1.886

Italian Schools in Brazil

There are two Italian Schools Abroad in the Brazilian territory, the Italian-Brazilian Bicultural Institute "Torino Foundation" in Belo Horizonte and the Italian School Eugenio Montale in São Paulo.

Courses offered by other institutions

There are seven committees of the Dante Alighieri Society in Brazil, based in the cities of Curitiba, Nova Friburgo, João Pessoa, Maceió, Recife, Rio de Janeiro and Salvador. At each of them it is possible to take Italian language courses; the locations in Curitiba, Maceió, Nova Friburgo and Recife also offer the possibility of obtaining PLIDA certification (together with the Franca Language Center).

Italian courses are also offered by Spazio Italiano in São Paulo and Associação Dante Alighieri in Brasilia.

== See also ==
- Languages of Italy
- Italian Brazilians

== Bibliography ==
- Altmayer, Everton Leopoldino (2009). A fala dos tiroleses de Piracicaba: um perfil linguístico dos bairros Santana e Santa Olímpia (PDF). São Paulo: USP.
- Altmayer, Everton Leopoldino (2010). Iliescu, Maria; Siller-Runggaldier, Heidi; Danler, Paul (eds.). "Perfil lingüístico da comunidade trentina da cidade de Paracicaba – Brasil". Actes du XXVe Congrès International de Linguistique et de Philologie Romanes: Innsbruck, 3-8 settembre 2007. 1. Berlin: De Gruyter: 251–258.
- de Andrade, Mário (1956). Os contos de Belazarte. São Paulo: Livraria Martins editôra.
- Bagna, Carla. America Latina, in SLEIM. pp. 305–357.
- Bertecchini Bilia, Marilisa (1997). "L'italiano parlato a San Paolo: un corpus per future ricerche". Revista de Italianística: 23–27.
- de Stauber Caprara, Loredana (2003). De Fina, Anna; Bizzoni, Franca (eds.). "L'italiano degli italiani di San Paolo alla fine del XX secolo". Italiano e italiani fuori d'Europa. Perugia: Guerra: 199–216.
- de Stauber Caprara, Loredana; Maggio de Castro, Giliola (2004). "L'apporto di Rai International all'italiano di San Paolo". Quaderni: 45–59.
- de Stauber Caprara, Loredana; Mordente, Olga Alejandra (2004). "Panorama dell'italiano in San Paolo nel contesto plurilinguistico brasiliano". Revista de Italianística: 101–112.
- Carboni, Florence (2002). "Eppur si parlano!" Étude diachronique d'un cas de contact linguistique dans le Rio Grande do Sul (Brésil). Passo Fundo: UPF.
- Casini, Maria Cecilia (1996). Teatro italiano a San Paolo del Brasile. Tesi di laurea in Storia del Teatro e dello Spettacolo. San Paolo-Firenze.
- Casini, Cecilia (2008). "Il trattamento dell'italiano in due novelas della Rede Globo: un'esperienza singolare per un'italiana in Brasile". Revista de Italianística: 129–137.
- Maggio de Castro, Giliola (1997). "Pedrinhas Paulista: comunidade italiana que ainda permanece ligada à língua materna". Revista de Italianística: 275–280.
- Maggio de Castro, Giliola (2003). "Vestigi di lingua italiana: testimonianze da Pedrinhas Paulista". Revista de Italianística: 51–76.
- Colli, Antonello (January–February 2000). "Italiani in Brasile, 25 milioni di oriundi". èItalia. Archived from the original on 2009-02-03.
- J. Devoto, Fernando (July–December 1993). "Emigrazione: un fenomeno di lunga durata". Altreitalie: 1–8. Archived from the original on 2022-12-03.
- de A. Ferrari, Lúcia; Raso, Tommaso; Heloisa Pereira Vale, Heloisa (2011). L'erosione linguistica di italiani colti in contatto con il portoghese brasiliano: aspetti del sistema pronominale in «Revista de Italianística». pp. 25–52. Archived from the original on February 7, 2015.
- Folena, Gianfranco (1983). L'italiano in Europa. Esperienza linguistiche del Settecento. Torino: Einaudi.
- Franceschi, Temistocle; Cammelli, Antonio (1977). Dialetti italiani dell'Ottocento nel Brasile d'oggi. Firenze: Cultura Editrice.
- Frosi, Vitalina Maria (1987). "I dialetti italiani nel Rio Grande do Sul e il loro sviluppo nel contesto socio-culturale ed economico: prevalenza del dialetto veneto". Lo Cascio: 136–163.
- Giovanardi, Claudio; Trifone, Pietro (2012). L'italiano nel mondo. Roma: Carocci.
- De Mauro, Tullio; Vedovelli, Massimo; Barni, Monica; Miraglia, Lorenzo (2002). Italiano 2000. I pubblici e le motivazioni dell'italiano diffuso fra stranieri. Roma: Bulzoni.
- de Almeida Leme, Maria Luisa (2001). Dio, che brut estudá... Um estudo lingüístico da comunidade tirolo- trentina da cidade de Piracicaba. Campinas: Editora da Unicamp.
- Lenard, Andrietta (1976). Lealdade lingüística em Rodeio – SC. Florianópolis: Universidade Federal de Santa Catarina.
- Licata, Delfina (2009). "L'emigrazione italiana in America Latina". Caritas/Migrantes, America Latina-Italia. Vecchi e Nuovi Migranti. Roma: Idos.
- Lo Cascio, Vincenzo (1987). L'italiano in America Latina. Convegno Internazionale svoltosi aa Buenos Aires nei giorni 1/5 settembre 1986. Firenze: Le Monnier.
- de Alcântara Machado, Antônio (1983). Brás, Bexiga e Barra Funda: notícias de São Paulo. São Paulo: Imprensa Oficial do Estado.
- Marcato, Carla (2007). "Il taliàn in Brasile: alcune opinioni dei parlanti" (PDF). Oltreoceano. I: 149–156.
- Marli Boso, Ivette (2002). Noialtri chi parlen tuti en talian: dialetti trentini in Brasile. Trento: Museo Storico.
- Meo Zilio, Giovanni (1991). "Isole linguistiche dell'italiano all'estero: il caso del Sudamerica". Lingua e Letteratura Italiana Nel Mondo Oggi, A Cura di Ignazio Baldelli e Bianca Maria da Rif. I. Firenze: Olschki: 226–247.
- Meo Zilio, Giovanni (2006). Veneti in Rio Grande do Sul. Ravenna: Longo.
  - Maraschin, L. T. "Descrizione della parlata dei discendenti di italiani nella città di Santa Maria, nel Rio Grande do Sul". In Meo Zilio (2006), pp. 113-125.
- Mordente, Olga Alejandra (1997). "Lo studio dell'italiano a San Paolo". Revista de Italianística: 17–21. doi:10.11606/issn.2238-8281.v5i5p17-21.
- Mortara, Giorgio (1950). "Immigration to Brazil: some observations on the linguistic assimilation of immigrants and their descendants in Brazil". Cultural Assimilation of Immigrants, «Population Studies». London-New York: Cambridge University Press: 39–44.
- de Oliveira, Gilvan Müller (1999). "Políticas lingüísticas no Brasil Meridional: os censos de 1940 e 1950 (a stampa" (PDF). Congreso Internacional políticas lingüísticas para América, Buenos Aires, 26-29 nov. 1997. Actas. Buenos Aires: Universidad de Buenos Aires: 405–16. Archived from the original (PDF) on 2015-02-09.
- de Oliveira, Gilvan Müller (2008). Plurilingüísmo no Brasil, Representação da UNESCO no Brasil / IPOL (PDF). Brasília.
- Pincherle, Maria Caterina (2006). ""Parlo assim para facilitar": la lingua italiana nelle Novelas paulistanas e nei Contos de Belazarte". Revista de Italianística (12): 9–27. doi:10.11606/issn.2238-8281.v0i12p9-27. Archived from the original on February 4, 2015.
- Raso, Tommaso (2003). "L'italiano parlato a San Paolo da madrelingua colti. Primi sondaggi e ipotesi di lavoro". Revista de Italianística: 9–49. doi:10.11606/issn.2238-8281.v0i8p9-49.
- Raso, Tommaso (2008). "A Erosão Sufixal dos Italianos Cultos en Contato com o Português Brasileiro (PB)". Revista de Italianística: 111–127.
- Raso, Tommaso; Pereira Vale, Heloisa (2011). "A erosão lingüística em italianos cultos em contato prolongado com o português do Brasil: os clíticos e alguns efeitos na estrutura do enunciado". Revista de Italianística: 77–93. Archived from the original on February 7, 2015.
- M. Rigatuso, Elizabeth (2005). "Contribución de la sociolingüística al studio del problema de la variación lingüística en la Argentina". Estudos de Variação Lingüística no Brasil e no Cone Sul. Porto Alegre: Editora da UFRGS: 229–256.
- Rizzolatti, Piera (2007). "Osservazioni sul friulano d'oltreoceano". Oltreoceano: 157–168.
- Nogueira da Rocha, Priscila; Gullo, Annita (2011). "O parâmetro do sujeito nulo: confronto entre o italiano e o português do Brasil". Revista de Italianística: 105–121.
- Sabbatini, Mario (1975). La Regione di colonizzazione italiana in Rio Grande do Sul: gli insediamenti nelle aree rurali. Firenze: Cultura cooperativa.
- Santoro de Constantino, Núncia (2002). "Italiani a Porto Alegre: l'invenzione di una identità" (PDF). Altreitalie: 76–90.
- Vedovelli, Massimo, ed. (2011). Storia linguistica dell'emigrazione italiana nel mondo. Rome: Carocci.
  - Secci, Alberto. "Il taliàn: spunti e riflessioni su un dibattito". In Vedovelli (2011), pp. 359–364.
- Trento, Angelo (2002). Bevilacqua, Piero; De Clementi, Andreina; Franzina, Emilio (eds.). Brasile, Storia dell'emigrazione italiana. Arrivi. Rome: Donzelli. pp. 3–23.
- Trento, Angelo (2011). La costruzione di un'identità collettiva. Storia del giornalismo in lingua italiana in Brasile. Viterbo: Sette Città.
- Vandresen, Paolino (1987). "Contatti linguistici in Brasile – tedesco, italiano e portoghese". Parallela 3. Linguistica Contrastiva / Linguaggi Settoriali / Sintassi Generativa, Herausgegeben von Ulrich W. Dessler, Corrado Grassi, Rosita Rindeler Schjerve, Martin Stegu. Tübingen: Narr: 94–102.
