= Murder of Bruno Vanzan Nunes =

2022 murder in Rio de Janeiro, Brazil

On October 27, 2022, Bruno Vanzan Nunes (April 30, 1981 — October 27, 2022) was killed when the Federal Highway Police agent responded to a robbery, and was shot on Transolímpica Avenue. Police forces in Rio de Janeiro mobilized to look for the criminals, but PRF agents killed Lorenzo Dias Palhinhas (March 31, 2008 — October 27, 2022), 14 years old, in Complexo do Chapadão.

The PRF claimed that the boy was part of drug trafficking and would have shot the car before dying. As evidence, the testimony of two other arrested boys was shown who admitted to being in the drug trade and a series of weapons and drugs seized. Also, the police stated that Lorenzo died from a stray bullet.

Already the family and residents claimed that the boy was just a burger delivery. He was allegedly approached by the police, released and then allegedly shot in the back of the head. The police would still have tried to move the body from the place, but the community did not allow it. Also, as proof, the newspaper O Dia published a video of the boy working as a delivery man.

The murder was witnessed by the residents, which resulted in a protest that was almost repressed by the police.

== Context ==
During the Bolsonaro government, the PRF was considered a Bolsonarized police force and participated in a series of killings. Among them are the massacre of Vila Cruzeiro, which left 23 dead and ranked as the second largest massacre in the history of Rio de Janeiro, and the murder of Genivaldo de Jesus, who was tortured and suffocated in the PRF van because he was riding a motorcycle without a helmet. In the Chapadão complex, the PRF had already participated in an operation that left six dead.

In Rio de Janeiro, Governor Cláudio Castro and his predecessor, Wilson Witzel, encouraged police violence, and under Castro's administration, three of the largest massacres in the state took place. In addition to Vila Cruzeiro, which ranked second, there was the Massacre do Jacarezinho, which ranked first, and the Chacina do Complexo do Alemão, which ranked fifth.

As of November 1, 2022, 44 public security agents have died from violence in Rio de Janeiro in the same year, and 89 children under 14 have died in the city since 2007.

== Murder of Bruno Vanzan Nunes ==
Murder of Bruno Vanzan Nunes
- Location: Avenida Transolímpica, near Vila Militar, in the West Zone of Rio de Janeiro, in Brazil
- Date: October 27, 2022; 14:12 (UTC-3)
- Attack type: Armed robbery
- Weapon: Fire gun
- Victim: Bruno Vanzan Nunes

Bruno Vanzan Nunes was 41 years old and worked as head of the policing and inspection nucleus of the 7th Police Station of the Federal Highway Police (PRF) in Resende. He was considered an exemplary police officer and had worked for the corporation since 2004, when he won first place in the public tender. He was married to Silvia Vanzan and had two children.

On October 27, 2022, around 2:12 pm, Bruno was driving his Jeep Renegade on Avenida Transolímpica, near Vila Militar, in the West Zone of Rio de Janeiro, while talking to his wife on his cell phone. He was in his way to the PRF superintendence. Then he was approached by a black Nissan Kicks. He reacted and shots were exchanged, leaving Bruno's vehicle shot. The cars paired up and Nunes got out of the vehicle and was pursued by the four criminals on foot.

A few meters from the murder, a Kia Cerato fled towards Vila Kennedy because it was being pursued by the Military Police (PM). On the way, criminals shot at a vehicle. A woman and her daughter, who were close to the car, fled for cover, and were not injured. The criminals hid inside a local slum. According to the PM, the vehicle was also involved in the murder.

Both exchanges of gunfire were caught on security cameras installed at the sites.

=== Expertise ===
After the exchange of fire, police from the Policing Battalion on Expressways (BPVE) were called. The Fire Department was also called around 2:20 pm, but the body had already been attended to by an ambulance before they arrived at the scene. Bruno's body was found under the Transolímpica, at the entrance to Avenida Duque de Caxias, in Magalhães Bastos. The area was isolated and the State Homicide Police Department started to investigate the case.

According to the PM, the bandits sought to steal the vehicle while it was still in motion. The police suspect that he tried to escape by jumping over the wall that divided the Transolímpica roads, but fell from a height of ten meters after being shot.

=== Funeral ===
Bruno Vanzan was buried the following day in Jardim da Saudade, in Sulacap, West Zone of Rio de Janeiro. The burial was attended by about 200 people, with 20 PRF motorcycles escorting the body.

=== Reactions ===
The PRF regretted what happened and showed its solidarity with the family, saying that Bruno "always stood out for his competence, efficiency and availability during the period in which he carried out his duties". ViaRio, which manages Transolímpica, also expressed its regret.

== Search operation ==
The Wanted Portal released a poster asking for information, with a reward of R$5,000. A denunciation hotline was opened with guaranteed anonymity.

After the assassination, security forces in Rio de Janeiro carried out a search for the criminals in Vila Kennedy. TV Globo caught the use of armored cars in the community, two helicopters from the Civil Police (PC) and one from the PRF.

The operations also had the participation of the Federal Police (PF) and the Military Police, including the Battalion of Special Police Operations (BOPE). Residents reported that police forces carried out home invasion. During the search, two motorcycles with a record of robbery/theft were recovered. The operation extended to Complexo do Chapadão, as there was information that ten people armed with rifles had burned the Kia Cerato used in the crime. Also, one of the robbers would have been killed, and another would be tied up waiting for the meeting of the top leadership of the Comando Vermelho (CV).

== Assassination of Lorenzo Dias Palhinhas ==
Assassination of Lorenzo Dias Palhinhas
- Location: Via Beco da Suede, in Complexo do Chapadão, in the West Zone of Rio de Janeiro, in Brazil
- Date: October 27, 2022 around 23:00 (UTC-3)
- Attack type: Killed in combat by a stray bullet (Federal Highway Police version) Murder (family and community version)
- Weapon: Fire gun
- Victim: Lorenzo Dias Palhinhas

Lorenzo Dias Palhinhas was 14 years old and lived with his mother, Celline, 28 years old, and had a three-year-old brother. He studied at the Honório Gurgel school and was in the seventh grade. He liked to play football and listen to funk music.

Around 11:00 pm on October 27, Lorenzo was shot dead in the back of the head while passing through Beco da Suede.

=== PRF version ===
According to the PRF, they were met with gunfire by about 30 suspects belonging to the organization Bonde da Índia, linked to drug trafficking, arrested two children who were working in a local tobacco den and killed Lorenzo with a stray bullet. Still according to the PRF, Lorenzo would have shot at the car before being hit. The apprehended boys admitted to being part of the drug trade. The PRF learned a .380 pistol with two magazines and 23 ammunition, a Taurus 9mm pistol with 5 magazines, one of them extended, 45 ammunition, a magazine for a 556 rifle, 600 packets of crack, 622 pins of cocaine, 149 bottles of loló and 425 marijuana tablets.

=== Witnesses ===
The family, however, stated that the boy was a burger delivery person and that he was working during the operation, even holding R$10.00 that he would have earned for a delivery when he was murdered. According to his mother, he was making deliveries on the back of a motorcycle when the driver, Fernando Padilha, was approached by the PRF, and when he was released, Lorenzo was shot in the back. He offered burgers around the favela by motorcycle, and had the goal of selling at least 70 burgers a day, earning about R$350.00 a week. His mother found out about the murder through the boy's boss. The scene was witnessed by witnesses. According to his grandfather, he was not found with any weapons or gunpowder. Residents also reported that the police ate part of the burgers that were in the boy's backpack and tried to move the body from the crime scene, but the community did not allow it. Also, the newspaper O Dia published a video of the boy working as a delivery man in the community. The mother also showed Revista Piauí a series of messages he sent to relatives discussing career issues.

=== Reactions ===
Councilman Luciano Vieira (PL), born in the favela, spent the night supporting Lorenzo's family. The leaders of the Federation of Favelas provided assistance and called the Federal Public Prosecutor's Office (MPF) and the Public Defender's Office. The Homicide Police opened an inquiry to investigate the murder. The MPF asked the PRF for a series of information, such as the names of the police officers involved in the murder, time of entry, expert reports and police reports.

The forensic team was called at around 7:00 am, but the residents prevented Lorenzo's body from being taken to the Legal Medical Institute (IML). The body was taken to the Carlos Chagas Hospital in a truck bed.

=== Funeral ===
Lorenzo Dias Palhinhas was buried on October 29 at the Municipal Cemetery of Irajá, in the North Zone of Rio. His body was veiled by his relatives, friends and other residents of the community. After the burial, residents honked their vehicles in protest. The cost of burial was paid by public bodies.

=== Investigation ===
On the same day of the murder, the Federal Public Ministry (MPF) opened an inquiry to investigate the circumstances of Lorenzo's death. The MPF reiterated that there was no communication from the PRF to carry out the operation and gave up to 72 hours to inform the agents who participated and the vehicle displacement record, in addition to other relevant information.

=== Protests ===
On October 28, around 3:00 am, residents closed the Rio do Pau road and Crisóstomo Pimentel de Oliveira avenue with rubble and burnt tires, and a bus was crossed to block the passage. Residents held signs such as "Lorenzo was a child" and "who killed Lorenzo?", in addition to comparing the police's actions with Lorenzo and Roberto Jefferson, who fired more than 50 shots and threw grenades at the PF, and received different treatment.

The protest gained support from the Public Defender's Office and the Human Rights Commission of the Brazilian Bar Association (OAB), who negotiated with the police so that it would not be repressed.

On November 1, family members and residents protested in the pouring rain in front of the 39th Police Station with signs and vehicles honking their horns.
