= Black Pantera =

Brazilian crossover thrash band

- Black Pantera at the 27th Annual Latin Grammy Awards, 2026

Background information
- Origin: Uberaba, Minas Gerais, Brazil
- Genres: Crossover thrash, thrash metal, hardcore punk
- Years active: 2014-present
- Label: Deckdisc
- Members: Charles Gama; Chaene da Gama; Rodrigo "Pancho" Augusto

Black Pantera is a Brazilian rock band founded in Uberaba, Minas Gerais, in early 2014. Formed by Charles Gama (guitar, vocals), Chaene da Gama (bass) and Rodrigo "Pancho" Augusto (drums), all of them African-Brazilians, the band discusses topics such as politics, racism and discrimination in general in its lyrics, among other topics; its name is inspired by the Black Panthers.

Influenced by Bad Brains, Rage Against the Machine, Tupac, Motörhead, James Brown, Metallica, Living Colour, Raimundos, Sepultura and Devotos, their sound has elements of thrash metal, hardcore punk and crossover thrash.

They performed in festivals such as Afropunk, Knotfest, Download, besides having opened for or performed with Dead Fish, System of a Down, Slayer, Project46, O Rappa and Sepultura, with shows in Colombia, France, Italy and the United States.

== History ==
The band was formed in April 2014 in Uberaba, Minas Gerais, by brothers Charles Gama (guitar, vocals, lyrics) and Chaene da Gama (bass) along with their friend and drummer Rodrigo "Pancho" Augusto. Initially, Chaene and Rodrigo had refused joining the band, but later changed their minds after hearing the first materials prepared by Charles. The first, self-titled album, came out in 2015. Work on the album began with the band's inception and lasted for 17 months, with the album being released in October.

In 2016, they performed at the French edition of the Afropunk Festival and had to promote a crowdfunding campaign in order to help them cover the traveling expenses. In 2018, they released their second album, Agressão, preceded by a video of "Prefácio". In the beginning of the next year, they released the track "Punk Rock Nigga Roll", along with its video, and then they signed with Deckdisc, after producer Rafael Ramos watched them perform live with Dead Fish. Around that time, they were planning an album for 2020.

During a tour in Europe, they believe they suffered racial discrimination in a gas station in Italy, in which they were searched by a group of police officers who did not do the same with any of the many other clients that were there at the time. According to the musicians, the officers pointed a number of irregularities (which they denied) about the van they charted and they allegedly laughed as the band left the station on a tower.

In June 2020, soon after the murder of George Floyd, they released the song "I Can't Breathe", its title alluding to the sentence repeated by Floyd as a police officer knelt on his neck. The footage of the incident was watched by Charles on 27 May, which inspired him to write the song. Two days later, the band got together to record the song and its video. "I Can't Breathe" also criticizes other police brutality episodes, such as those which resulted in the deaths of Brazilian children João Pedro and Ágatha Felix.

The video, directed by Leonardo Ramalho from Pajé Filmes (who had already directed the video for "Punk Rock Nigga Roll"), shows Charles being strangled by a single white hand; the idea conveyed is that black people, despite being the majority of the World's population, are still on racists' mercy.

Still in 2020, they released the EP Capítulo Negro (Black Chapter), with covers of "Identidade", by Jorge Aragão; "Todo Camburão Tem um Pouco de Navio Negreiro", by O Rappa; and "A Carne", by Farofa Carioca, made famous by Elza Soares.

On 10 October 2020, they took part in the first on-line edition of the event "Sim à Igualdade Racial" (Yes to Racial Equality), organized by the Instituto Identidade Brasil. In the following month, they would participate in the first Brazilian edition of Afropunk, but it was cancelled due to the COVID-19 pandemic and converted in an on-line event to be hosted by the end of October.

On 1 February 2022, Black Pantera was announced as part of the line-up of the Sunset Stage of Rock in Rio 2022, alongside Devotos. The invitation had been made in 2020, but the band was prevented from revealing it due to a non-disclosure agreement. Following their invitation, they were invited by newspaper O Globo to interview Living Colour.

Their EP Griô was chosen by the Associação Paulista de Críticos de Arte as one of the 50 best Brazilian albums of 2023.

=== 2024—present: Perpétuo ===
In April 2024, Black Pantera was featured in the project "Futuro da Música" (Future of Music), by Rolling Stone Brasil.

On 26 April 2024, they released the single "Provérbios", the opening track of their new album. In May, they release the second single "Tradução", with a video On 24 May 2024, their fourth album Perpétuo is released via Deck. The cover art was inspired by a notorious image of the Black Panther Party in front of the René C. Davidson Courthouse in Oakland, California, on 30 July 1968. Perpétuo was chosen by Rolling Stone Brasil as the second best album of 2024. The track "Tradução" received the "Song of the Year" award by the Associação Paulista de Críticos de Arte and they also included the album in their list of 50 best albums of 2024.

In October, they supported American group Living Colour in Belo Horizonte and São Paulo. In November, they released a video for "Candeia", off Perpétuo. On 2 of the same month, they supported British band Sleaford Mods in São Paulo.

On 4 May 2025, they performed at Bangers Open Air in São Paulo, on the stage where Dorsal Atlântica, Vader, Haken, Nile and Destruction also played.

On 24 May, they performed at SESC Belenzinho as part of the Virada Cultural programme in São Paulo, featuring Clemente (Inocentes), Cannibal (Devotos) and Natália Matos (Punho de Mahin).

Also in the first half 2025, they won the Rock Artist category of Prêmio da Música Brasileira. In June, they released "Unfuck This" via Deck. In the same month, on 14, they performed at the Best of Blues and Rock in Ibirapuera Park in São Paulo on the same day as Alice Cooper.

== Discography ==
Studio albums

- Project Black Pantera (2015)
- Agressão (2019)
- Ascensão (2022)
- Perpétuo (2024)
- Continental (2026)

EP

- Capítulo Negro (2020)

Live albums

- Black Pantera no Estúdio Showlivre (Ao Vivo) (2018)
