= Eunice Durham =

Brazilian anthropologist (1932–2022)

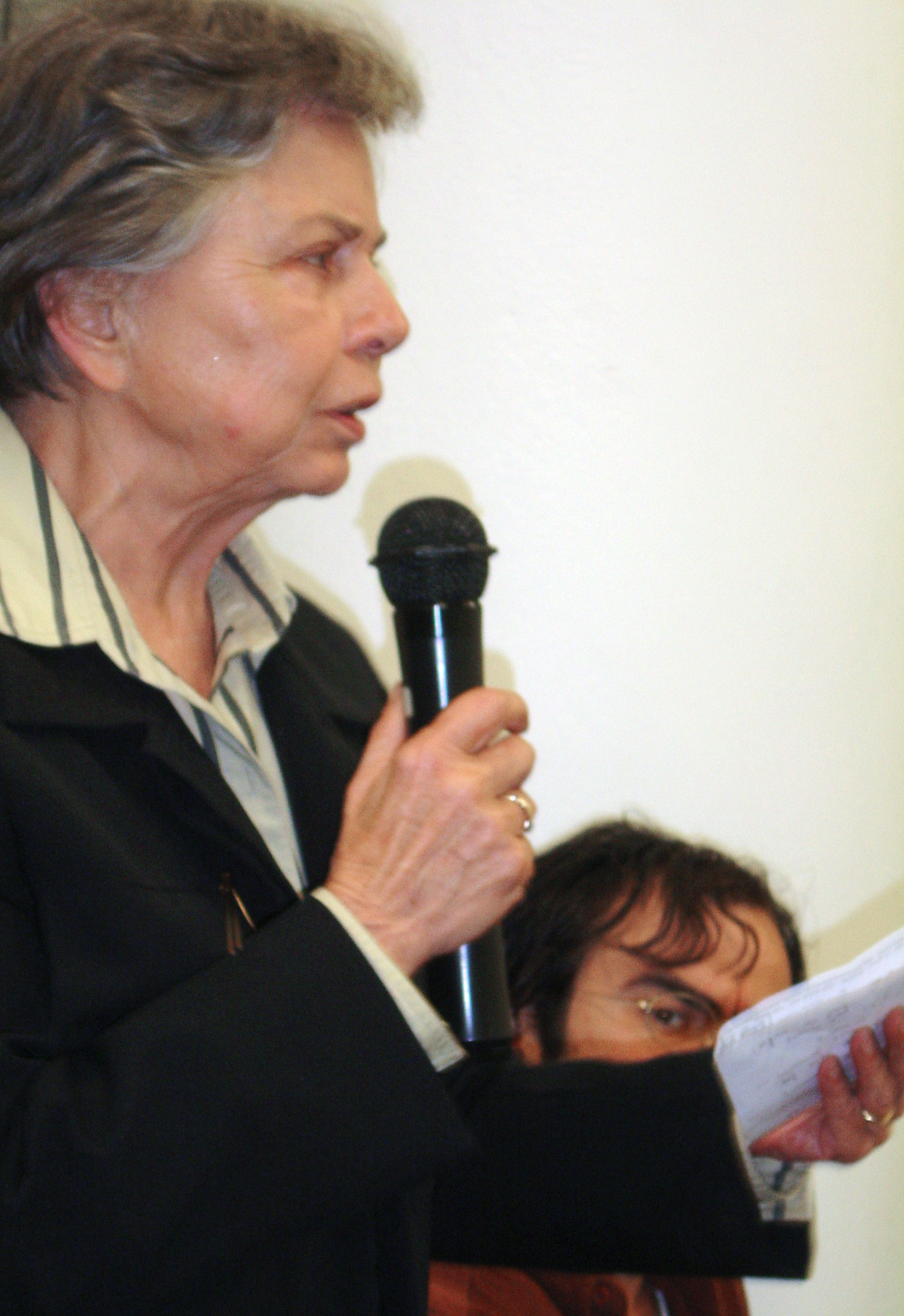
Durham in 2004

Eunice Durham (3 July 1932 – 19 July 2022) was a Brazilian anthropologist.

== Life and career ==
Durham was born Eunice Todescan Ribeiro in the city of Limeira, moving with her family to São Paulo when she was 3 years old. She graduated in Social Sciences at the University of São Paulo (1954), studying under Florestan Fernandes and as a research assistant of Gioconda Mussolini. At this same institution she received her master's degree in Social Science (Social Anthropology) in 1964 and her Ph.D. in Social Science (Social Anthropology) in 1967, both under the supervision of Egon Schaden. She conducted a study on Italian migration in São Paulo, becoming a reference in studies on urban anthropology. She also distinguished herself in the study of "the area that explores the changes that higher education goes through as it responds to the new demands of the knowledge society".

She made her career at the Faculty of Philosophy, Literature and Human Sciences at the University of São Paulo. Besides a broad production in her two fields of education, she has also played an active role in the discussion of science policy in Brazil. She was one of the founders of the Brazilian Center for Analysis and Planning (CEBRAP), in 1969, and president of the Brazilian Anthropology Association between 1978 and 1980 and between 1982 and 1984. She was president of the Coordination for the Improvement of Higher Education Personnel (Capes) in the Fernando Collor and Fernando Henrique Cardoso administrations, served as vice-president of the Brazilian Society for the Advancement of Science (SBPC) for one term, and directed the Center for Research on Higher Education (Nupes) at USP, an interdisciplinary center that between 1989 and 2005 led discussions on Brazilian university education.

She also held the position of National Secretary of Higher Education at the Ministry of Education in 1992 and National Secretary of Educational Policy at the Ministry of Education between 1995 and 1997 during Fernando Henrique Cardoso's government, and between 2008 and 2012 she was a member of the State Council of Education. During this time, she worked with Darcy Ribeiro on the Law of Directives for the Bases of National Education, approved in 1996 and which guides Brazilian education to this day. She also worked on the creation of Fundef. In 2005, she became a researcher and member of the board of the Center for Public Policy Research at the University of São Paulo.

== Works ==
- A dinâmica da cultura: ensaios de antropologia. São Paulo: Cosac Naify, 2004. ISBN 978-8575033654
- Família e reprodução humana. Rio de Janeiro: Zahar, 1983.
- A reconstrução da realidade. Um estudo da obra etnográfica de Bronislaw Malinowski. São Paulo: Ática, 1978.
- A caminho da cidade. A vida rural e a migração para São Paulo. 2. ed. São Paulo: Ática, 1973.
- Mobilidade e Assimilação. A história do imigrante italiano num município paulista. São Paulo: IEB, 1966.
- A difusão do Adventismo da Promessa no Catulé. São Paulo: Anhembi-INEP, 1957 (as Eunice Todescan Ribeiro).
