= Sandra Cavalcanti =

Brazilian politician (1925–2022)

- Cavalcanti in 1965

Federal Deputy for Rio de Janeiro
- In office 1987–1995

State Deputy of Rio de Janeiro
- In office 1975–1979

State Deputy of Guanabara
- In office 1960–1963

Alderman for Federal District
- In office 1955–1959

Personal details
- Born: Sandra Martins Cavalcanti de Albuquerque; 30 August 1925 Belém, Pará, Brazil
- Died: 11 March 2022 (aged 96) Rio de Janeiro, Brazil
- Party: UDN (1954–1966); ARENA (1966–1979); PTB (1980-1985); PDR (1985–1986); PFL (1986–1993); PPR (1993–1995); PP (1995–2022)
- Education: Pontifical Catholic University of Rio de Janeiro
- Awards: Order of Military Merit; Order of Prince Henry

Sandra Martins Cavalcanti de Albuquerque (30 August 1925 – 11 March 2022) was a Brazilian politician, linguist, and academic. She was a deputy from 1987 to 1995. Cavalcanti died on 11 March 2022, at the age of 96.
