= Murder of Bruno Pereira and Dom Phillips =

2022 disappearance and murder in Brazil

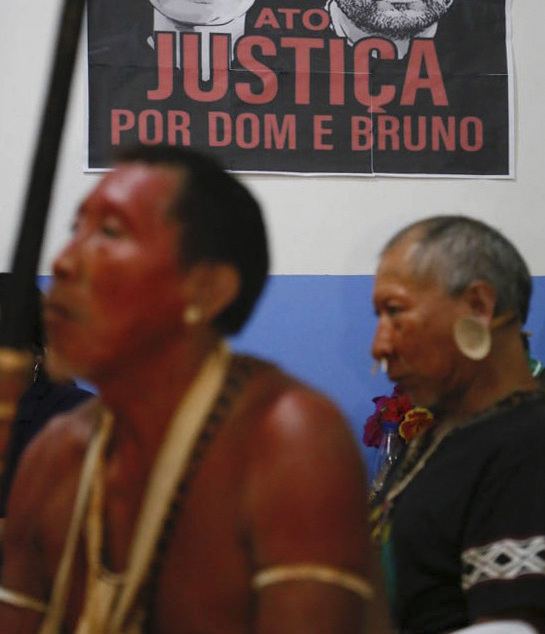
- Poster seeking justice for the two men
- Date: 5–15 June 2022
- Location: Near Atalaia do Norte, Amazonas, Brazil
- Type: Disappearance and murder
- Deaths: Bruno Pereira; Dom Phillips
- Suspects: Amarildo da Costa de Oliveira; Oseney da Costa de Oliveira; Jefferson da Silva Lima; Rubens Villar Coelho
- Accused: Marcelo Xavier; Alcir Amaral Teixeira
- Charges: Amarildo, Oseney, Jefferson and Rubens charged with two counts of murder and corpse concealment; Marcelo and Alcir charged with murder and negligent corpse omission

On 5 June 2022, Brazilian indigenist Bruno Pereira and British journalist Dom Phillips were murdered during a boat trip through the Vale do Javari, the second-largest indigenous area in Brazil.

Two brothers were arrested by the Federal Police of Brazil for suspected involvement in the murders. A few days later, one of the brothers confessed to the murders, telling the police where he had buried the bodies as well as the location of the boat they used. The forensics investigation concluded with the identification of the bodies on 22 June. It is believed the crime was motivated due to disputes about fishing and other natural resources, with the victims supporting the rights of indigenous groups against poachers.

Phillips' body was cremated in Niterói in a ceremony reserved for family and close friends. Pereira's body was cremated in the city of Paulista in a ceremony that included indigenous rituals.

== Background ==
On 5 June 2022, Bruno Pereira and Dom Phillips arrived at Lago do Jaburu, a location near the National Indian Foundation Surveillance Base on the Ituí River. Phillips planned to visit the site and conduct interviews with indigenous people. Two days later, they both went to the São Rafael community, where they were to hold a meeting with a local fisherman nicknamed "Churrasco." The meeting aimed to discuss joint work between riverine and indigenous people in the surveillance of the Javari Valley, a territory badly affected by invasions and criminal activities. However, the fisherman was not there, so they talked to his wife. Pereira and Phillips disappeared while traveling along the Itaguaí River, heading towards the municipality of Atalaia do Norte.

== Victims ==
=== Bruno Pereira ===
Bruno Pereira (Bruno da Cunha Araújo Pereira) was born in the city of Recife, in Pernambuco, on 15 August 1980. He was an indigenist and career civil servant with FUNAI, and was considered one of the country's leading experts on isolated or recently-contacted indigenous people. In 2019, he led the largest expedition to contact isolated indigenous peoples in 20 years. However, under pressure from ruralist sectors linked to the government of Jair Bolsonaro, he was dismissed from his post in October of that year by Sergio Moro's then-executive secretary at the Ministry of Justice, Luiz Pontel. According to indigenous entities, Pereira was constantly threatened by gold miners and fishermen.

=== Dom Phillips ===
Dom Phillips (Dominic Mark Phillips) was born in Bebington (Cheshire, United Kingdom), on 23 July 1964, and worked as a freelance journalist, contributing to the Financial Times, The Guardian, The New York Times, and The Washington Post. He moved to Brazil in 2007 and lived in Salvador. He was writing a book about the Amazon rainforest and its sustainable potential.

== Criminal prosecution ==
=== Investigations ===
On 5 June, the Union of Indigenous Organizations of the Javari Valley (Univaja) organized two search teams that left Atalaia do Norte and Tabatinga. Without success, it released a note on its social networks denouncing the disappearance and asking for help in the search. The Federal Police announced that they were investigating the event but gave no further details.

On 7 June, the Military Police searched the residence of Amarildo da Costa de Oliveira, known as "Pelado", after receiving an anonymous tip about his supposed participation in the disappearances. He was arrested for possession of drugs and unauthorized possession of restricted ammunition. The police seized the suspect's speedboat, where traces of blood were found and sent for analysis. On 12 June, the firefighters' team in Atalaia do Norte found a backpack, a laptop, and a pair of sandals near Amarildo's house. The following day, Dom Phillips' family was wrongly informed by the Brazilian Embassy in the United Kingdom that the bodies had been found.

On 15 June, Amarildo confessed his participation in the crime and indicated to the authorities where he had buried the bodies as well as the place where Pereira and Phillips' boat sank. The Federal Police found human remains at the indicated location and did not rule out further arrests. The day before the confession, Amarildo's brother, Oseney da Costa de Oliveira, was arrested.

On 18 June, police arrested a third suspect in the killings, Jefferson da Silva Lima.

=== Criminal procedure ===
On 21 July 2022, the Public Prosecutor's Office charged three people for the murder of Phillips and Pereira and the concealment of the bodies. The accusation was filed in the Federal Court of the town of Tabatinga, in Amazonas state. According to the prosecutors, Pereira was killed with three shots, one of them in the back, while Phillips was murdered only because he accompanied Pereira at the time of the crime.

The police have also indicted the former head of Brazil's Indigenous protection agency for their role in the murder. Despite the indictment, the name of the official has not been revealed. According to the investigation, the police claim that the officer received information that could have prevented the deaths of Pereira and Phillips.

Police have now charged two more people with the murders including Ruben Dario da Silva Villar and Jânio Freitas de Souza. Villar is the alleged mastermind behind the murder and is reportedly responsible for an illegal transnational fishing network between Brazil, Colombia, and Peru.

== Aftermath ==
The case had vast repercussions in Brazil, international media, mobilized societies, and trade associations. The Federal government of Brazil has been criticized for not taking sufficient search measures and weakening institutions designed to protect the environment.

=== International press ===
Press coverage that increased since the beginning of the case gained international traction. The Guardian, a newspaper for which Dom Phillips had written, stated there was "growing fear about the safety of the two men, who disappeared in the forest days after receiving threats." BBC News has covered what it termed Phillips' "family and friends demand[ing] answers." The French newspaper Le Monde openly criticized the delay of the Federal Police and the Navy in initiating the search in the far west of the Amazon, pointing out that both only acted after media pressure and urgent intervention of the Public Defender's Office of the Union. The New York Times and The Washington Post drew attention to the delay in sending helicopters to scour the dense vegetation.

== See also ==
- List of solved missing person cases (2020s)
