= Dom Phillips =

British journalist (1964–2022)

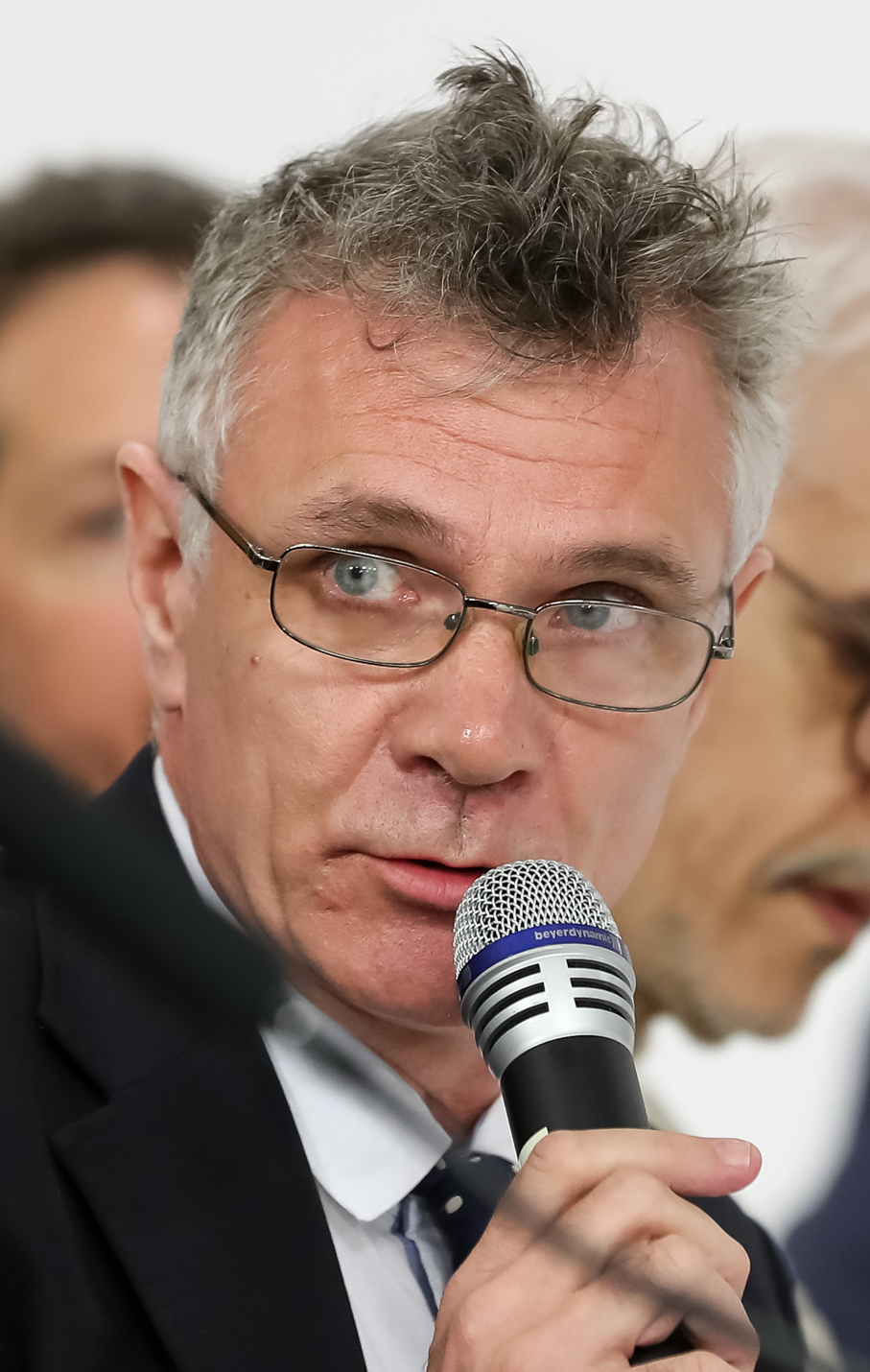
- Phillips in 2019
- Born: Dominic Mark Phillips; 23 July 1964; Bebington, Cheshire, England
- Disappeared: 5 June 2022; Atalaia do Norte, Amazonas, Brazil
- Died: 5 June 2022 (aged 57); Atalaia do Norte, Amazonas, Brazil
- Cause of death: Shot
- Body discovered: 15 June 2022; Atalaia do Norte, Amazonas, Brazil
- Resting place: Parque da Colina cemetery Niterói, Brazil
- Occupation: Journalist
- Employer(s): Freelancer; The Guardian; The Washington Post
- Spouse: Alessandra Sampaio (m. 2015)

Dominic Mark Phillips (23 July 1964 – 5 June 2022) was a British freelance journalist. He wrote for The Guardian and The Washington Post, and contributed to The Times, the Financial Times and Bloomberg News, among others.

On 5 June 2022, he and Brazilian Bruno Pereira, an expert on indigenous peoples of Brazil, went missing in the remote Javari Valley in the far western part of the state of Amazonas in Brazil, one of the most remote zones in the rainforest. On 14 June, Amarildo da Costa da Oliveira allegedly confessed to shooting and killing Phillips and Pereira and led police to the men's bodies the following day.

== Early life and education ==
Phillips was born to Gillian (née Watson) and Bernard Phillips on 23 July 1964, in Bebington, Cheshire. His mother was a Welsh schoolteacher, and his father was an Irish accountant who later became a lecturer at Liverpool Polytechnic. He had a sister and a brother. During his youth, Phillips shared his family's interest in music and outdoor activities, forming a series of bands with his brother and friends.

Phillips won a scholarship to St Anselm's College in Birkenhead. He studied literature in a combined degree at Hull University for a few months. He then switched to a course at Middlesex Polytechnic, but gave it up. He travelled around the world, living in Israel, Greece, Denmark and Australia.

== Career ==
In Liverpool, Phillips set up The Subterranean, a short-lived fanzine, with Neil Cooper in the early 1980s. It was named after the Jack Kerouac novel The Subterraneans. In the 1990s, Phillips wrote and edited for Mixmag, where he coined the term "progressive house".

In 2007, Phillips moved to Brazil to finish a book about electronic music. In 2009, he published Superstar DJs Here We Go!: The Rise and Fall of the Superstar DJ, a frontline history of 1990s club culture.

Phillips wrote about politics, poverty and cultural development in Brazil. From 2014 to 2016 he contributed to The Washington Post, where he covered Brazil's preparations for the 2014 FIFA World Cup and the 2016 Summer Olympics. He reported on deforestation in Brazil, leading an investigation by The Guardian and the Bureau of Investigative Journalism of large-scale cattle ranches established on cleared forest land. His coverage of illegal deforestation in the Amazon was nominated for the 2020 Gabo Award for Journalistic Coverage and was a finalist for the Vladimir Herzog Prize that same year.

Phillips also contributed to The Times, the Financial Times, Bloomberg News, The Intercept, The Observer, The Independent, The Daily Beast, soccer magazine FourFourTwo and energy newswire Platts.

In June 2022, Phillips had been in the Vale do Javari region, researching for a book on sustainable development there. He had received a fellowship from the Alicia Patterson Foundation to write the book, and aimed to finish it by the end of 2022.

== Personal life ==
Phillips married a woman named Nuala, whom he later divorced. In 2013, Phillips met Alessandra Sampaio at a party near his home in Santa Teresa, Rio de Janeiro. They married in 2015. He lived in São Paulo, Rio de Janeiro and Salvador.

== Murder ==
Phillips and Brazilian Bruno Pereira, an expert on indigenous peoples of Amazonas, received death threats for helping to protect the people from illegal drug traffickers, miners, loggers, and hunters.

Orlando Possuelo, an Indigenous rights activist, said he received a message from Pereira at 6 a.m. on 5 June 2022. Pereira said he and Phillips were going to pass by the riverside community of São Rafael on their way to Atalaia do Norte, in the remote Javari Valley, in the far western part of the state of Amazonas in Brazil, one of the most remote zones in the rainforest. Possuelo arranged to meet Pereira at 8 a.m., but Pereira and Phillips never arrived. Possuelo said that when they failed to appear, he retraced their steps to the location where they were last seen. Members of an Indigenous surveillance team there told him that a boat belonging to an illegal fisherman had been seen going down the river in the same direction after Pereira's boat passed. The Brazilian embassy in London released a statement that his body had been found on Monday, 13 June, but retracted it the following day, apologizing to Phillips' family for "information that did not prove correct."

On 15 June, a second man named Amarildo da Costa da Oliveira, who was arrested days before in connection with the case, confessed to shooting and killing Phillips and Pereira and revealed the location of their bodies, confirmed by the Federal Police. The remains were then discovered by the Brazilian authorities, who sent them to the country's capital, Brasília, to be examined.

On 17 June, the remains that were discovered were identified as belonging to Phillips; these were authenticated through dental records. He was 57 years old. On 18 June, Federal Police confirmed that the second body encountered at the crime scene belonged to Pereira.

The killings of Phillips and Pereira were condemned by the Director-General of the UNESCO Audrey Azoulay in a press-release published on the 16 June 2022. According to global monitoring on the safety of journalists by the Observatory of Killed journalist, Phillips was the 1st media professional killed in Brazil in 2022.

== Funerals ==
Pereira's funeral was held on 24 June 2022 in Recife, Pernambuco and Phillips' funeral was held on 26 June in Nitéroi, Rio de Janeiro. The bodies of both men were cremated. As of 27 June, police were still investigating to determine all of the people responsible for ordering and performing the assassination.

== See also ==
- List of solved missing person cases (2020s)
