= Bruno Pereira =

Brazilian indigenist (1980–2022)

- Born: 15 August 1980; Recife, Pernambuco, Brazil
- Disappeared: 5 June 2022; Atalaia do Norte, Amazonas, Brazil
- Died: 5 June 2022 (aged 41); Atalaia do Norte, Amazonas, Brazil
- Cause of death: Shot
- Body discovered: 15 June 2022
- Resting place: Morada da Paz cemetery, Recife, Brazil
- Education: Federal University of Pernambuco
- Occupation: Indigenist

Bruno da Cunha Araújo Pereira (15 August 1980 – 5 June 2022) was a Brazilian indigenist and career employee of the National Indian Foundation (FUNAI). He was an expert on uncontacted or recently contacted indigenous people in the country and on the Vale do Javari.

== Early life and education ==
Pereira was born as the second of the three sons to Max Pereira Pereira and Maria das Graças da Cunha on 15 August 1980 in Recife. His father worked as a sales executive in the aluminum and glass industries and his mother was an employee of Brazil government's pension office. After graduating from Colegio Contato in Recife, he wrote Brazil's university entrance exam to study journalism. After passing the exam, he started studying journalism at the Federal University of Pernambuco (UFPE) in 2000, but left the course in 2003, deciding that his future lay in the country's forests.

== Career ==
Pereira worked for a period at the National Institute of Social Security (INSS) in Recife. After getting a job in the environmental program at the Balbina Hydroelectric Power Plant, Pereira went to the Amazon region.

After a few years at the Balbina hydroelectric plant, Pereira was approved in a competitive examination by the National Indian Foundation (Funai) and chose to go to the Javari Valley, the indigenous land with the highest concentration of isolated indigenous people in the world. In 2018, Pereira became the general coordinator of Isolated and Newly Contacted Indigenous People at Funai, when he headed the largest expedition for contact with isolated groups.

In 2019, Pereira led the largest expedition to contact isolated indigenous people in the last 20 years. However, after pressure from ruralist sectors linked to the Jair Bolsonaro government, he was removed from his post in October of that year by Sergio Moro then executive secretary at the Ministry of Justice, Luiz Pontel.

According to indigenous entities, Pereira was constantly threatened by miners, loggers, and fishermen.

Pereira also coordinated a project to equip indigenous people to defend their territory with drones, computers and training. Pereira claimed that the invaders felt more at ease as a result of the permissiveness of the public authorities, and surveillance has undergone a continuous weakening process.

== Murder ==
Pereira and journalist Dom Phillips received death threats for helping to protect Indigenous people of Amazonas from illegal drug traffickers, miners, loggers, and hunters. They were reported missing in early June 2022 while they were on a trip in the Vale do Javari. A confession of murder led to the discovery of their bodies; both had been shot to death. He was 41 years old.

== See also ==
- List of solved missing person cases (2020s)
