= João de Aquino =

Brazilian guitarist and composer (1945–2022)

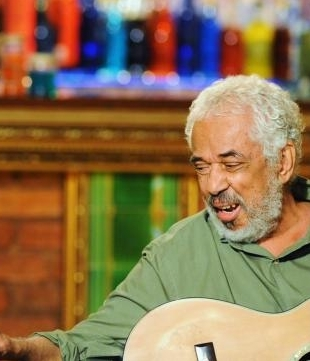

João de Aquino (23 July 1945 – 28 September 2022) was a Brazilian guitarist and composer. He was a cousin of the famous guitarist Baden Powell de Aquino.

== Discography ==
- Violão Viageiro (1974)
- Terreiro Grande (1978)
- Asfalto (1980)
- João de Aquino e Maurício Carrilho (1986)
- Patuá (1991)
- Carta Marcada (1994)
- Bordões (1996)
