= Gilson Dipp =

Brazilian jurist and magistrate (1944–2022)

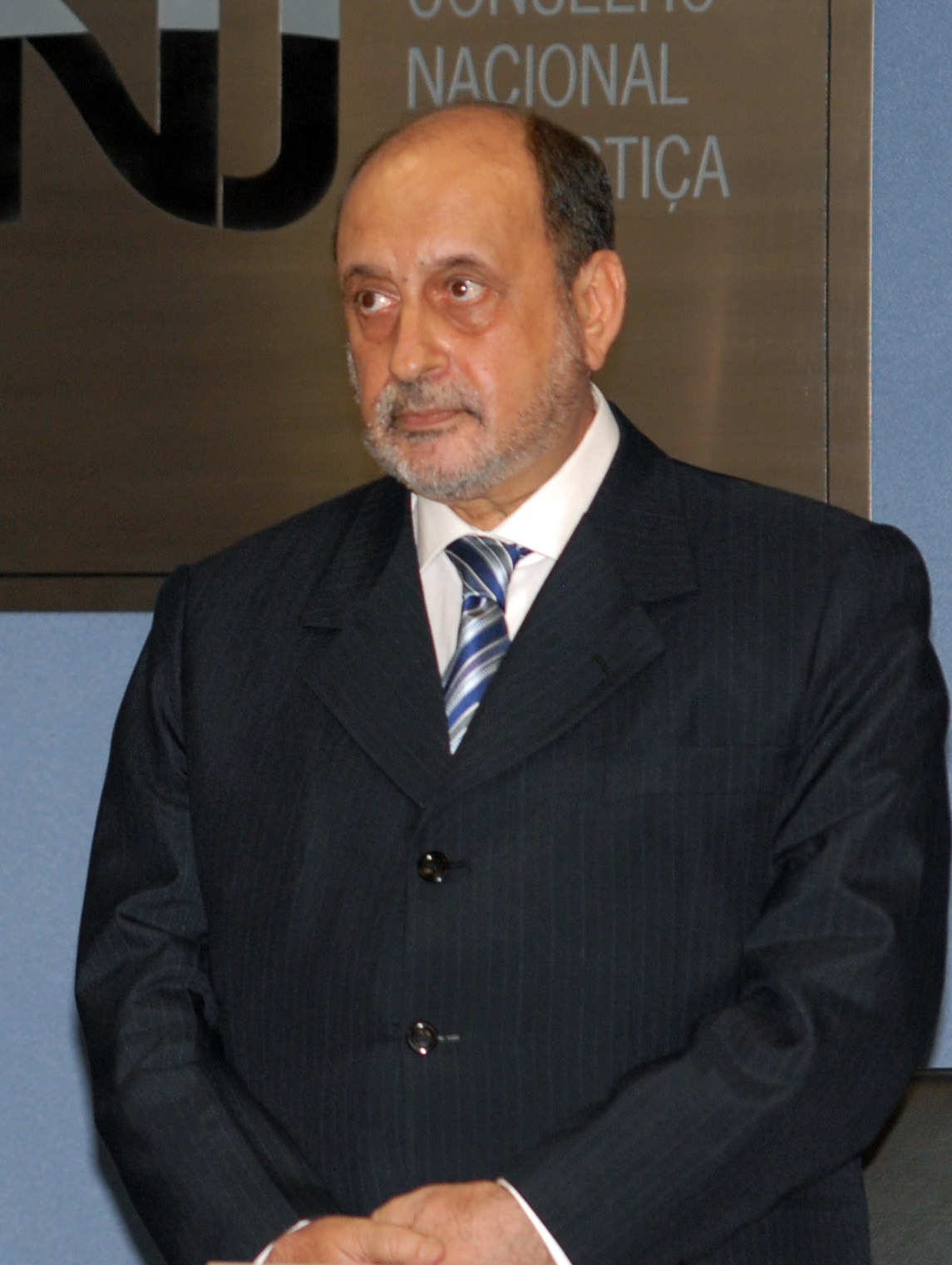
- Dipp in 2008

Minister of the Superior Court of Justice
- In office 29 June 1998 – 25 September 2014
- Appointed by: Fernando Henrique Cardoso
- Preceded by: Américo Luz
- Succeeded by: Joel Ilan Paciornik

Personal details
- Born: Gilson Langaro Dipp; 1 October 1944; Passo Fundo, Brazil
- Died: 28 November 2022 (aged 78); Brasília, Brazil
- Education: UFRGS
- Occupation: Jurist; magistrate

Gilson Langaro Dipp (1 October 1944 – 28 November 2022) was a Brazilian jurist and magistrate. He served as Minister of the Superior Court of Justice from 1998 to 2014.

Dipp's father, Danielle Dipp, was a lawyer and politician born to Syrian father and a Lebanese mother.

Dipp died in Brasília on 28 November 2022, at the age of 78.
