= Murder of Durval Teófilo Filho =

2022 killing in Rio de Janeiro, Brazil

- Location: Colubandê, São Gonçalo, Rio de Janeiro, Brazil
- Date: 2 February 2022 c. 22:00 (UTC−3)
- Target: Durval Teófilo Filho
- Attack type: Murder by shooting
- Weapon: Firearm
- Deaths: 1
- Victim: Durval Teófilo Filho
- Perpetrator: Aurélio Alves Bezerra
- Defender: Saulo Alexandre
- Motive: Allegedly thinking the victim was a burglar
- Inquiry: Undergoing investigation
- Accused: Aurélio Alves Bezerra
- Charges: Murder
- Judge: Juliana Grillo El-Jaick

The murder of Durval Teófilo Filho took place on the night of 2 February 2022 in São Gonçalo, Rio de Janeiro, Brazil. He was shot by a neighbour as he arrived at the building where he lived. The shooter allegedly thought that Durval was a burglar.

== Background ==
Durval Teófilo Filho, 38 years old at the time, was described by friends and relatives as someone "helpful, intelligent, hardworking, smiling and family". He had been married for 13 years to Luziane Teófilo, with whom he had a daughter, aged six at the time. He lived in a condominium in São Gonçalo, which he bought in search of more security. Durval worked as a stock replenisher in a supermarket in Niterói.

== Murder ==
Shortly after 10PM, Durval left the supermarket where he worked. He arrived home and was preparing to open the gate, looking for the key in his backpack. At that time, he was shot three times by his neighbor Aurélio Alves Bezerra, a Navy sergeant, who was inside a car. According to Aurélio, after seeing that Durval had approached his car very quickly, he decided to shoot him, hitting his stomach. He stated that he "believed that he would be robbed, as Durval was touching something around his waist, which he believed to be a firearm", while also saying that "since it was raining, he could not see with precision what Durval was holding". Aurélio asked if Durval was armed, and he replied that he was not. After confirming that Durval really wasn't armed, Aurélio came to help and took him to the Alberto Torres State Hospital, but he died on the spot. The report from the Instituto Médico Legal (IML) reported that the cause of death was bleeding caused by a firearm projectile.

=== Prison ===
Aurélio was arrested red-handed. To the police, he said that "the locality is dangerous and tends to have many robberies". Initially, the Baixada Fluminense Homicide Police indicted Aurélio for manslaughter with no intention to kill, and stipulated a bail of 120 thousand reais. At first, Aurélio was also listed as a "victim", since he declared that the act would have been self-defense, but this was changed shortly afterwards. After a custody hearing, Judge Ariadne Villella Lopes changed it to intentional homicide. In addition, the Public Prosecutor's Office requested that the arrest in flagrante delicto be converted into preventive detention. The sergeant's lawyer, Saulo Alexandre, considered the preventive detention unnecessary and said he would request a habeas corpus so that the client would respond freely.

== Repercussion ==
Luziane, the victim's wife, said that this was an act of racism: "Seeing the cameras, listening to the delegate's speech and what the neighbors are saying, I'm sure that this happened because he is black. Condominium resident, the neighbor didn't want to know. For me, yes, it was racism". Such a view was supported by the press. Durval's wake, at the São Miguel cemetery, witnessed by hundreds of people, was marked by protests from relatives and friends, displaying posters of "Black Lives Matter" and "we want justice for Durval".

One more dead black and that's it? I've been through this in my life several times. My father was like that, I had cousins who were like that. But now again? Not now. I go where I have to go, understand? Because justice has to be done.

In a note, the Brazilian Navy said that it "became aware of the occurrence involving one of its military personnel, in São Gonçalo-RJ, and informs that it is collaborating with the responsible bodies to clarify the fact. The MB regrets what happened and sympathizes with the victim's family."

== Judgment ==
The first hearing on the case took place on 4 April 2022 at the 4th Criminal Court of the São Gonçalo Forum. The second hearing took place on 9 May 2022. Aurélio's preventive detention was maintained.

== See also ==
- Murder of Moïse Mugenyi Kabagambe
