= Congolese immigration to Brazil =

Congolese immigrants living in Brazil

- (Democratic Republic of the Congo) (Brazil)

Total population
- 1,050 recognized refugees (in 2021), 3,000 - 4,700 (in 2022, according to the media)

Regions with significant populations
- Rio de Janeiro

Languages
- Portuguese; Languages spoken in the Democratic Republic of the Congo

Congolese immigration to Brazil increased substantially in the early 2020s, driven by wars and conflicts in the Democratic Republic of the Congo that forced many people to flee their country.

The Congolese people in Brazil are found mostly in the favelas or the outskirts of Rio de Janeiro.

The Congolese people are one of the most underpaid immigrants in Brazil. They also have to deal with violence, racism and xenophobia.

== See also ==
- Congolese diaspora
- Murder of Moïse Mugenyi Kabagambe
