= Ermano Batista Filho =

Brazilian lawyer and politician (1937–2022)

Member of the Legislative Assembly of Minas Gerais
- In office 1991–2007

Personal details
- Born: 21 November 1937 Aimorés, Brazil
- Died: 10 July 2022 (aged 84) Governador Valadares, Brazil
- Party: PL; PSDB
- Occupation: Lawyer

Ermano Batista Filho (21 December 1937 – 10 July 2022) was a Brazilian lawyer and politician. A member of the Liberal Party and later the Brazilian Social Democracy Party, he served in the Legislative Assembly of Minas Gerais from 1991 to 2007.

Batista Filho died from a traffic collision in Governador Valadares on 10 July 2022, at the age of 84.
