= Lajeado do Bugre =

Municipality in Rio Grande do Sul, Brazil

Coordinates: 27°41′20″S 53°10′55″W

- Municipality
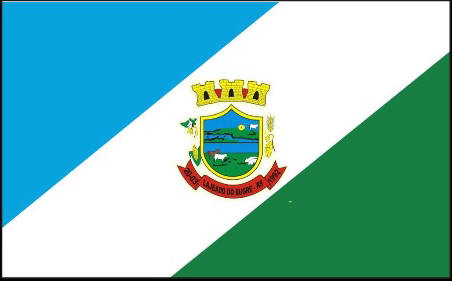
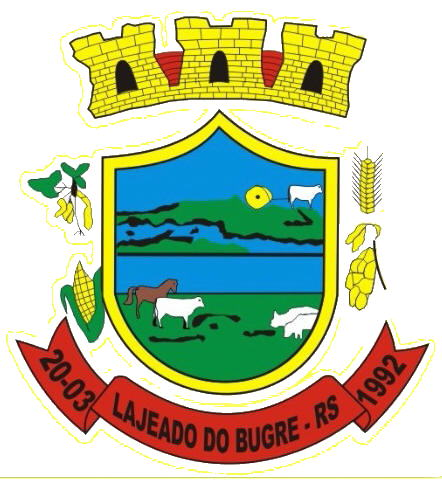
- Flag Coat of arms
- Interactive map of Lajeado do Bugre
- Country: Brazil
- Time zone: UTC−3 (BRT)

Lajeado do Bugre is a municipality in the state of Rio Grande do Sul, Brazil. As of 2020, the estimated population was 2,566.

== See also ==
- List of municipalities in Rio Grande do Sul
