= Killing of Genivaldo de Jesus =

2022 homicide in Brazil

- Location: Umbaúba, Sergipe, Brazil
- Date: 25 May 2022 (4 years ago) c. 12pm (UTC-3)
- Target: Genivaldo de Jesus
- Weapon: Gas
- Deaths: 1
- Accused: Clenilson José dos Santos; Paulo Rodolpho Lima Nascimento; Adeilton dos Santos Nunes; William de Barros Noia; Kleber Nascimento Freitas

On 25 May 2022, Genivaldo de Jesus Santos, a black man diagnosed with schizophrenia, was tortured and killed by the Federal Highway Police (PRF) in Umbaúba, Sergipe, Brazil, using an improvised gas chamber. His death, which occurred exactly two years after the murder of George Floyd, has had international repercussions.

== Backstory ==
At the time, Genivaldo de Jesus Santos was 38 years old and retired due to schizophrenia. He was married to Maria Fabiana dos Santos, had a seven-year-old son and an 18-year-old stepson. He had been taking controlled medication for twenty years. He lived in a house with only two rooms, in a simple neighbourhood of the city of Umbaúba, in the south of the state of Sergipe.

== Death ==
On 25 May 2022, at around 12:00 am (UTC-3), on the BR-101 highway, in Umbaúba, south of the state of Sergipe, Federal Highway Police agents Clenilson José dos Santos, Paulo Rodolpho Lima Nascimento, Adeilton dos Santos Nunes, William de Barros Noia and Kleber Nascimento Freitas took part in an operation called Safe Northeast when they asked Genivaldo to stop his motorbike. He knew how to drive, but did not have a National Driver's License (CNH). His crime would have been driving without a helmet. The victim's nephew, Wallison de Jesus, who was nearby, said that Genivaldo "heeded all the commands". A police officer asked Genivaldo to lift up his shirt and then he would have claimed that he had psychiatric drugs in his pocket and had a prescription to prove the disorders. Videos made by witnesses show that at the beginning of the approach, the agents look at the documentation and search Genivaldo with their hands on his head, swear at him, and the man gets upset. Genivaldo reacted to the aggressiveness of the approach and was therefore knocked down and immobilised. Another video recorded by a witness shows an officer trying to immobilise him with his legs on his neck, while another approaches armed.

The nephew tried to warn him that his uncle was schizophrenic, but even so, the police officer called for reinforcement, and then a motorbike and another vehicle arrived. According to Wallison, the police began to torture Genivaldo, who received a burst of pepper spray, kicks in the legs and stomps on the head. Witnesses said he was assaulted for about thirty minutes. He was then placed in the vehicle with his hand behind his back, with his legs sticking out. While the officers were pressing the boot lid against Genivaldo, one of them threw a gas bomb inside the vehicle. A video shows a police officer unlocking such an object and throwing it inside the vehicle. White smoke was then seen billowing from the vehicle. Wallison reported that an officer then pushed his mother, prompting his sister-in-law to say: "Boy, don't do that". The officer replied, "He's better off than us in there". The policemen filmed the people who were filming the scene in a threatening tone. As soon as Genivaldo stopped struggling and screaming, the policemen put his legs in and closed the back door of the vehicle, got into the car and left the scene. Genivaldo was taken to the Civil Police Station of Umbaúba, where he was found to be unconscious. He was taken "immediately" to José Nailson Moura Hospital, where his death was confirmed. According to the report of the Forensic Medical Institute (IML), Genivaldo's death was caused by mechanical asphyxia and acute respiratory failure.

=== Funeral ===
Genivaldo's body was collected by the IML and arrived in Aracaju at 4.58pm UTC-3. The body was released from the IML around 10:30 pm UTC-3. He went to his mother's house, in Santa Luzia do Itanhy, where he was buried, at around 11am UTC-3 on 26 May.

== Investigation ==
In a statement, the PRF said that Genivaldo "actively resisted an approach" and that, for this reason, "immobilization techniques and instruments of less offensive potential were employed for his restraint". The note does not mention that the two police officers locked Genivaldo in the boot while white smoke was seen being expelled from inside the vehicle. Wallison said: "At no time did he show force. In fact, when he was approached, he raised his hands and shirt, and showed that he didn't have any weapon". The PRF opened a disciplinary procedure to investigate the conduct of the police officers involved and the family registered a police report. The Minister of Justice, Anderson Torres, said: "I have ordered the Federal Police and Federal Highway Police to open an investigation into yesterday's police raid in Sergipe. Our goal is to clarify the episode with the brevity that the case requires".

The Federal Police (PF) opened an enquiry to investigate the case: "diligences about the case have already been initiated and the PF is working to clarify what happened as soon as possible". The Order of Attorneys of Brazil in Sergipe is following the developments and said in a statement that, "it has respect for the institutions, but does not support any kind of violence or torture". The Public Prosecutor's Office (MPF) said it had opened proceedings to follow up on the investigations into the facts that led to Genivaldo's death. The Human Rights Commission (CDH) of the Federal Senate said it will investigate the death of Genivaldo.

The PRF reported on 26 May that it had removed the police officers involved. On 27 May, the Regional Office for the Rights of the Citizen in Sergipe opened investigative proceedings on the case, for "violations of citizens' rights and, in particular, of the rights of persons with disabilities". On 28 May, the Federal Council and the OAB of Sergipe requested the precautionary arrest of those involved in Genivaldo's death. On 28 May, the Workers' Party presented a request to the Labour Commission calling for the summoning of Justice Minister Anderson Torres and the invitation to PRF Director-General Silvinei Vasques, demanding explanations about the case.

On 7 December 2024, Paulo Rodolpho Lima Nascimento, William de Barros Noia and Kleber Nascimento Freitas, were convicted and sentenced to between 23 and 28 years imprisonment for Genivaldo's killing.

== Reactions ==
The video of the police action went viral on the Internet, provoking a reaction from politicians, civil society, human rights organisations and several artists. The international non-governmental organisation Human Rights Watch, which defends and conducts research on human rights, has spoken out and said it is "dismayed and shocked by the death of Genivaldo de Jesus Santos, a 38-year-old black man with psychosocial disabilities, at the hands of the Federal Highway Police in Sergipe". The United Nations Human Rights Office for South America issued a statement calling on Brazilian authorities to carry out a "swift and thorough" investigation into the death of Genivaldo. Jan Jarab, head of the office, said that the case, "in itself shocking, once again calls into question the respect for human rights in the actions of the police in Brazil," also citing cases such as the Vila Cruzeiro massacre. The Brazilian Public Security Forum issued a note, writing that "the death of Genivaldo Jesus Santos shocked Brazilian society by the level of its brutality, exposing the unpreparedness of the institution in ensuring that its agents obey basic procedures of approach that guide the work of security forces in Brazil". The Dom Paulo Evaristo Arns Human Rights Commission defended the arrest of the police officers involved and that the "crime demands prompt investigation of individual responsibility, according to due legal process, which was denied to the prisoner in his summary execution". Two associations that militate in the black movement filed a public civil action against the Union in the Sergipe Federal Court, seeking compensation for collective and social moral damage for the death of Genivaldo, estimated at R$128 million (USD 22885750.04).

The widow, Maria Fabiana dos Santos, said: "I don't even call it fatality. This was really a crime, they acted cruelly to kill him". A nephew of the victim, Ismael dos Santos, said: "We still can't understand what happened. My uncle was without a helmet, but here in the interior it is something common and even so he shouldn't have been killed for that. That is not a crime of death." President Jair Bolsonaro commented: "I will check with the PRF". At a meeting of former President Luiz Inácio Lula da Silva with social movements on 27 May, a minute's silence was held for Genivaldo, while he, former governor Geraldo Alckmin and other leaders held up placards calling for justice.

On the Internet, users linked Genivaldo's case to the gas chambers used by the Nazis in Jewish extermination camps during the Second World War. Michel Gherman, coordinator of the Interdisciplinary Nucleus of Jewish Studies at the Federal University of Rio de Janeiro (UFRJ), advisor to the Brazil-Israel Institute and professor of sociology, stated: "It is not that it looks like Nazism, in terms of the practice of murder, it is Nazism. If used exactly the same way of killing that Nazism had". The case was among the most talked about topics on social networks on May 26. On Twitter, the hashtags "Sergipe", "Genivaldo", "Gas Chamber", "Umbuába", "Murder" and "Federal Highway Police" added up to more than 176,000 posts, and hashtags like #PRFAssassina (#FHPMurderers) appeared. Users associated the case with the murder of George Floyd, which occurred exactly two years earlier, when he was asphyxiated to death by a police officer. An artwork, created by Cristiano Siqueira, which features the victim's face with the words "Justice for Genivaldo", went viral on social networks. According to him, his intention was to show his work as a tool to manifest and question police violence.

The case was reported by international newspapers BBC News, CNN, The Guardian, The Washington Post, Reuters, Deutsche Welle, Al Jazeera, The Telegraph, France 24 and El País, and local newspapers of wide circulation Clarín, Corriere della Sera, Bild and Cānkǎo Xiāoxī.

=== Protests ===
Residents and representatives of social movements protested on the 26th in Umbaúba, blocking a stretch of the BR-101 highway that gives access to the municipality. Tyres were burned and signs calling for justice were displayed. Representatives of CUT Sergipe joined the demonstrations, stating in a statement that they would demand an answer from the competent authorities: "Until when will the police continue killing the population and remain unpunished?" The following day, demonstrators gathered in Brasilia, in front of the PRF headquarters, calling for justice for Genivaldo de Jesus Santos. The act was organised by the movement "Pelas Vidas Negras" ("For Black Lives") of the Federal District and was supported by groups fighting for an "end to racism". On the same day, a protest took place in front of the Superintendence of the Federal Highway Police, in the North Zone of São Paulo. On the morning of the 28th, there was a protest organised by the black movement and human rights activists, with banners and placards with slogans such as "Stop Killing Us" and "Vidas Negras Importam".

== See also ==
- Torture in Brazil
- Police brutality in Brazil
