= Umbaúba =

Municipality in Sergipe, Brazil

Umbaúba Município de Umbaúba
- Municipality
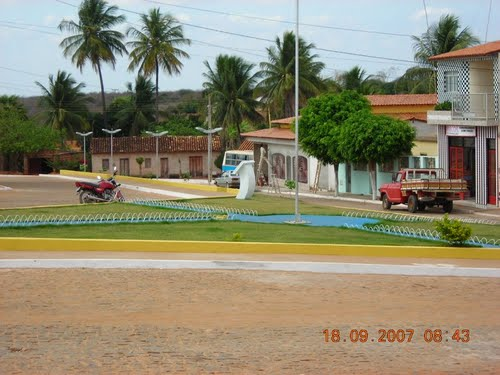
- Daniel Teixeira Square, Umbaúba

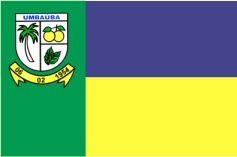
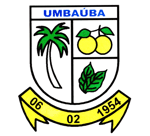
- Flag Coat of arms

- Location of Umbaúba in Brazil
- Coordinates: 11°22′58″S 37°39′28″W
- Country: Brazil
- Region: Northeast
- State: Sergipe

Government
  - Mayor: Humberto Santos Costa (2017-2020)

Area
  - Total: 118.86 km^{2} (45.89 sq mi)

Population (2020)
  - Total: 25,550
  - Density: 215.0/km^{2} (556.7/sq mi)
- Demonym: Umbaubense
- Time zone: UTC−3 (BRT)
- Website: umbauba.se.gov.br

Umbaúba (Brazilian Portuguese: [ũbaˈubɐ]) is a municipality located in the Brazilian state of Sergipe. Its population was 25,550 (2020). Umbaúba covers 118.86 km^{2} (45.89 mi^{2}) and has a population density of 210 inhabitants per square kilometer. The municipality is located 95 km (59 mi) from the state capital of Sergipe, Aracaju.

== See also ==
- List of municipalities in Sergipe
