= Treviso, Santa Catarina =

Coordinates: 28°31′S 49°28′W

Treviso
- Municipality
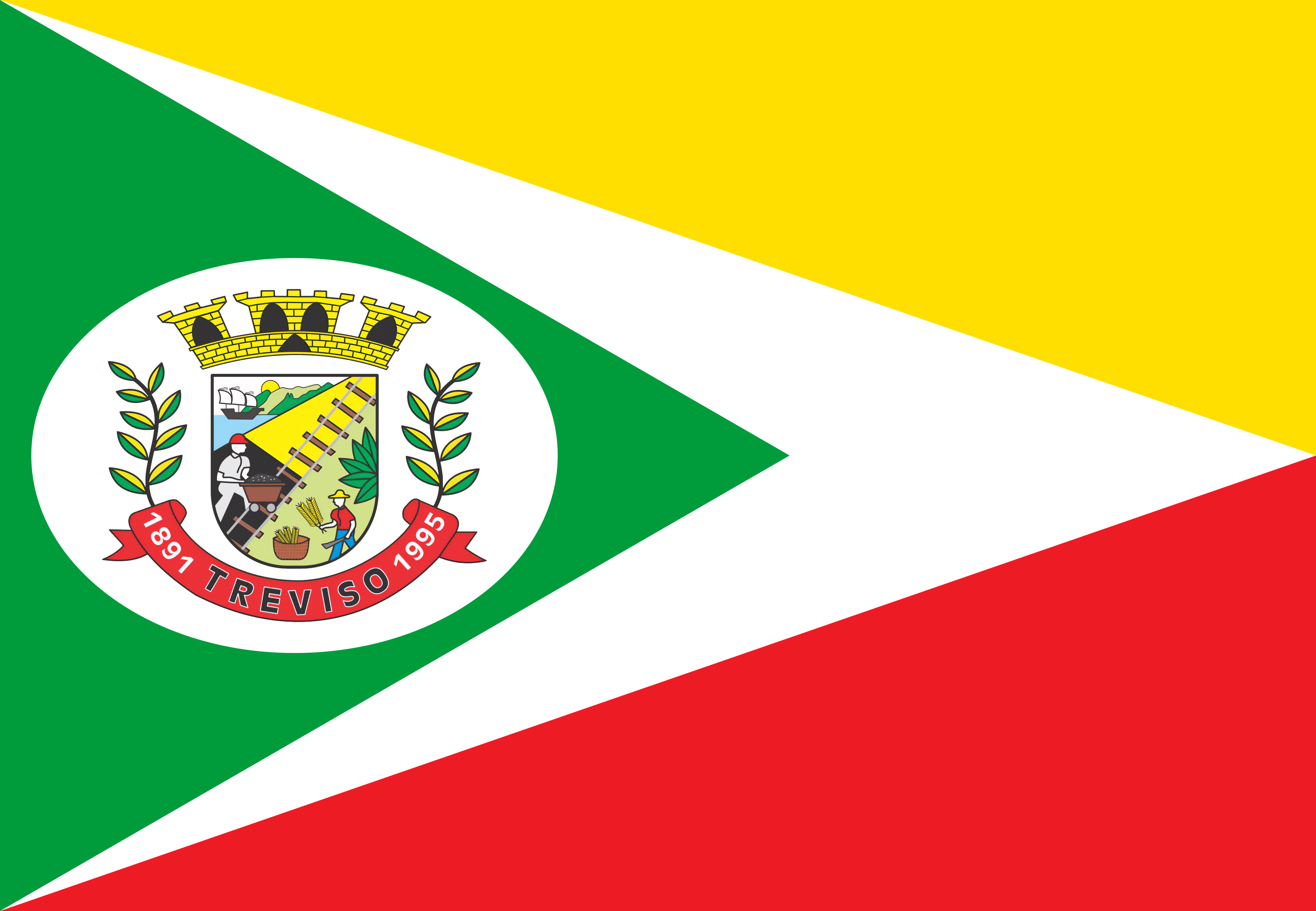
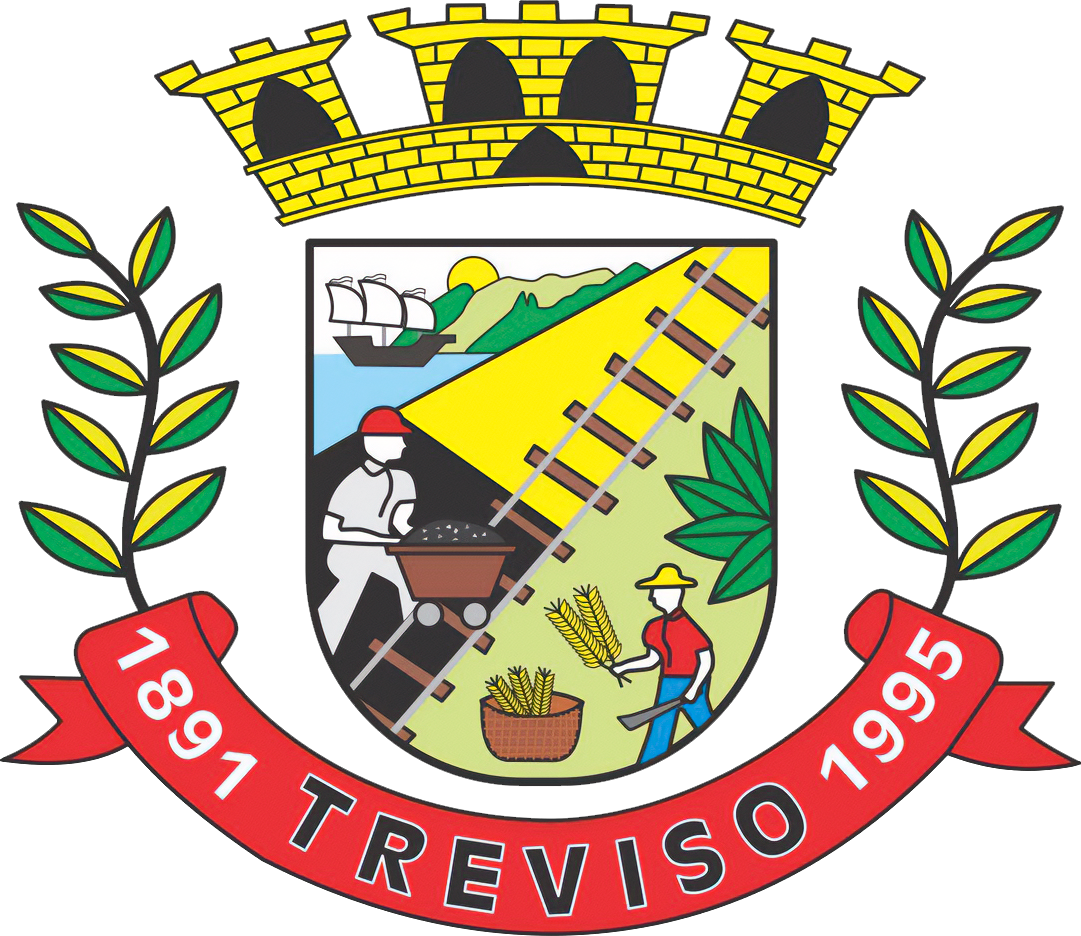
- Flag Coat of arms
- Interactive map of Treviso
- Country: Brazil
- Region: South
- State: Santa Catarina
- Mesoregion: Sul Catarinense

Government
  - Type: Municipal government

Area
  - Total: 60.496 sq mi (156.685 km^{2})
- Elevation: 443 ft (135 m)

Population (2020)
  - Total: 3,966
  - Density: 65.56/sq mi (25.31/km^{2})
- Time zone: UTC -3
- Area code: (48)
- Website: www.treviso.sc.gov.br

Treviso, Santa Catarina is a municipality in the state of Santa Catarina in the South region of Brazil.

== History ==
Diseases and agricultural crises provoked a massive migration from the North of Italy. The most of first settlers of Treviso were Venetian-speakers migrants from that region. The name of the municipality came from Treviso, a comune of Veneto.

== See also ==
- List of municipalities in Santa Catarina
