= Murder of Moïse Mugenyi Kabagambe =

2022 murder in Rio de Janeiro, Brazil

- Date: January 24, 2022; 4 years ago
- Type: Murder
- Suspects: Aleson Cristiano de Oliveira Fonseca "Dezenove"; Brendon Alexander Luz da Silva "Totta"; Fábio Pirineus da Silva "Belo"

On January 24, 2022, three men killed Moïse Mugenyi Kabagambe, a Congolese immigrant in Brazil, in a beach kiosk called Tropicália in Rio de Janeiro.

Kabagambe's family learned about his death in the next day and his death was reported in newspapers on January 29. The reports followed by reactions on social networks condemning the murder and demanding justice. Politicians, celebrities, and organizations linked to human rights and the black rights movement also expressed their outrage at Kabagambe's murder.

On February 5, protests in memory of Kabagambe took place in several Brazilian capitals and at the Brazilian embassy in Berlin, Germany. The protests denounced racism and xenophobia. Some protests also called for impeachment against Brazil's President Jair Bolsonaro.

== Background ==
Moïse Mugenyi Kabagambe was born in Bunia, in the Ituri Province of the Democratic Republic of the Congo (DRC). Because of the Ituri conflict, Kabagambe and his family, together with his siblings and mother, left the DRC as refugees and migrated to Brazil in 2011. Kabagambe worked in a beach kiosk called Tropicália in Barra da Tijuca district, Rio de Janeiro, receiving daily wages for his work.

== Murder ==
On January 24, 2022, Moïse Mugenyi Kabagambe went to the Tropicália kiosk to collect two days' unpaid wages worth R$200 (US$38). According to family members, he was tied up and beaten with weapons including a baseball bat. A couple who witnessed the incident said they asked for help from two municipal guards and that the guards did not go to check on the kiosk.

A video circulated by the press and on social media, shows Kabagambe arguing with an employee, who grabs a piece of wood. In response, Kabagambe picks up a chair and a broom, and shortly after releases them. Kabagambe then takes out a bag and his shirt, and opens the freezer, when another man approaches and starts to attack Kabagambe. Two other unidentified men join in the violence against Kabagambe. The aggressors, noticing Kabagambe's lack of reaction, unsuccessfully try to help him by performing CPR. At the end of the video, Kabagambe is dragged away.

According to the local Instituto Médico Legal, the institution responsible for autopsies in Brazil, Kabagambe died due to blunt trauma to his chest.

== Aftermath ==
Kabagambe's relatives told the press they were intimidated by military police agents on January 25 and 29. On February 1, 2022, police arrested three people in connection with Kabagambe's death. The next day, the Court of Justice of the State of Rio de Janeiro announced the arrest of the three individuals already detained by the police and on the same day, the Public Ministry of Labor started an investigation.

The local authorities shut down the Tropicália kiosk, and the adjacent kiosk, which was called Biruta, also had its license suspended by Orla Rio, Rio de Janeiro's kiosk concessionaire. Alauir Mattos de Faria, the supposed owner of kiosk Biruta, was considered an "irregular occupant", prompting Orla Rio to open a lawsuit against Celso Carnaval, the actual owner of Biruta.

Lawyers for Carlos Fabio da Silva Muzi, the owner of Tropicália, ruled out any involvement with the death and said there was no debt to Kabagambe because he was not a fixed employee. The lawyers also stated Carlos Muzi had received death threats since the murder came to light. The three individuals arrested by the police admitted they were Kabagambe's killers but deny they intended to kill him, or that the violence against Kabagambe was motivated by racism or xenophobia.

On 15 March 2025, Aleson Cristiano de Oliveira Fonseca and Fabio Pirineus da Silva were convicted over the murder. Fonesca was sentenced to a prison term of 23 years and seven months, while da Silva to was sentenced to 19 years and six months' imprisonment.

== Reactions ==
The Congolese community in Brazil released a statement to the press. On social media, there were several mentions of Kabagambe's death. The hashtags "#JustiçaParMoise" and "#JustiçaParaMoiseMugenyi" were used on Twitter. Brazilian politicians and celebrities also expressed outrage and disgust at the killing on their social media accounts.

Both Rio de Janeiro Governor Cláudio Castro and Rio de Janeiro Mayor Eduardo Paes made statements on Twitter. Eduardo Paes said Kabagambe's murder was "unacceptable and outrageous", and that those responsible will be punished. In another tweet, Paes is shown together with Kabagambe's family.

In a joint statement, the United Nations High Commissioner for Refugees (UNHCR), International Organization for Migration (IOM), and PARES Caritas RJ stated; "are following the case, hoping that the crime will be clarified. At this moment, the organizations express their sincere condolences and solidarity to Kabagambe's family and to the Congolese community residing in Brazil." The Brazilian chapter of Amnesty International published a statement repudiating the violence against Kabagambe, stating the murder was "a blatant and unacceptable case of violation of the human right to life and human dignity".

Human Rights Watch said the murder is "deplorable", and expressed solidarity with Kabagambe's family and the Congolese community in Brazil. The Black Coalition for Rights repudiated the killing of Kabagambe, and affirmed violence against Afro-Brazilians is common. The coalition also said it would help organize protests against Kabagambe's murder.

The DRC's embassy in Brazil denounced the death of Kabagambe and demanded answers from Brazilian authorities. The diplomatic representation stated there are four other cases of Congolese people who have been murdered in Brazil still waiting for the results of police investigations. The Brazilian Ministry of Foreign Affairs (known as Itamaraty), in response, said "Itamaraty expresses its indignation over the brutal murder and hopes those responsible are brought to justice as soon as possible", and also mentioned the process of obtaining refugee status in Brazil. The Brazilian ambassador in Kinshasa was summoned by the DRC's Foreign Affairs Minister Christophe Lutundula.

The kiosks where Kabagambe was killed will become a memorial to Congolese culture, and one of the establishments was given to his family.

== Disinformation ==
On January 31, 2022, a Twitter account that is supposedly connected to Anonymous released the name of a person who was thought to be the current owner of the kiosk in which Kabagambe was killed. Journalist Giselle Aquino showed the claim is false and her findings were published by journalist Diego Sangermano, both working for SBT.

== Protests ==
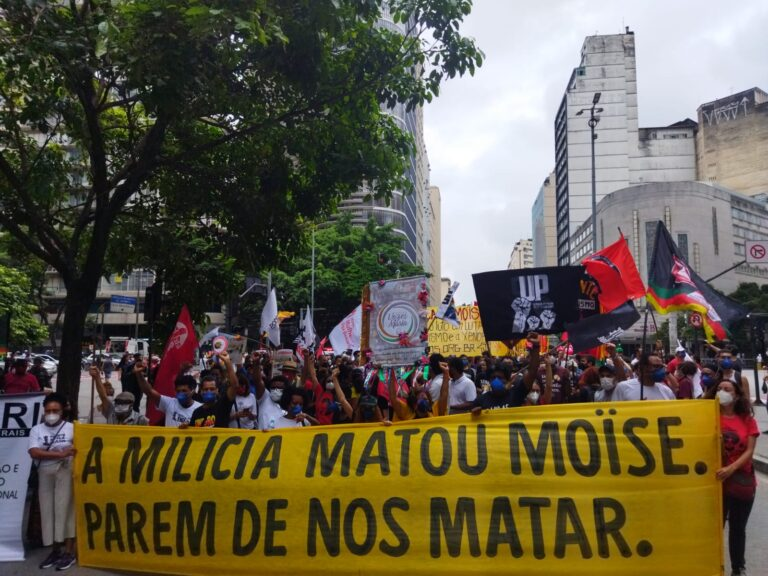
Protesters in Belo Horizonte

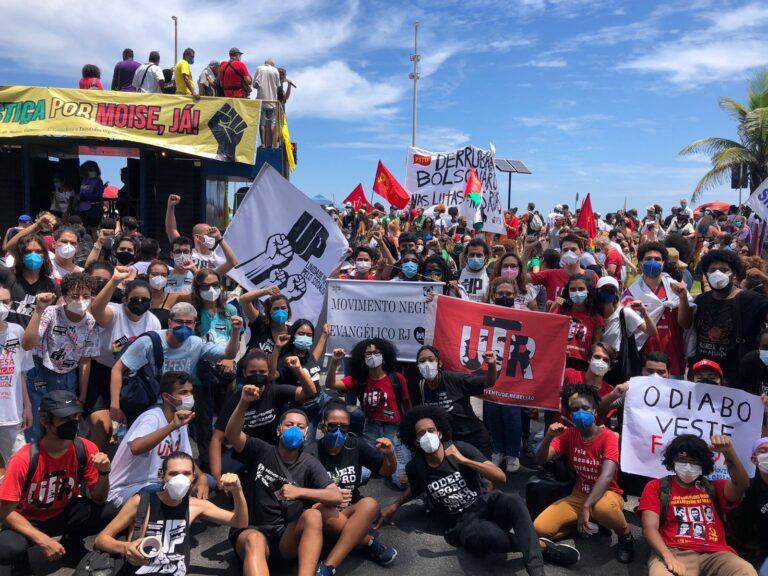
Thousands were protesting near the kiosk Tropicália, Rio de Janeiro, where Moïse was killed.

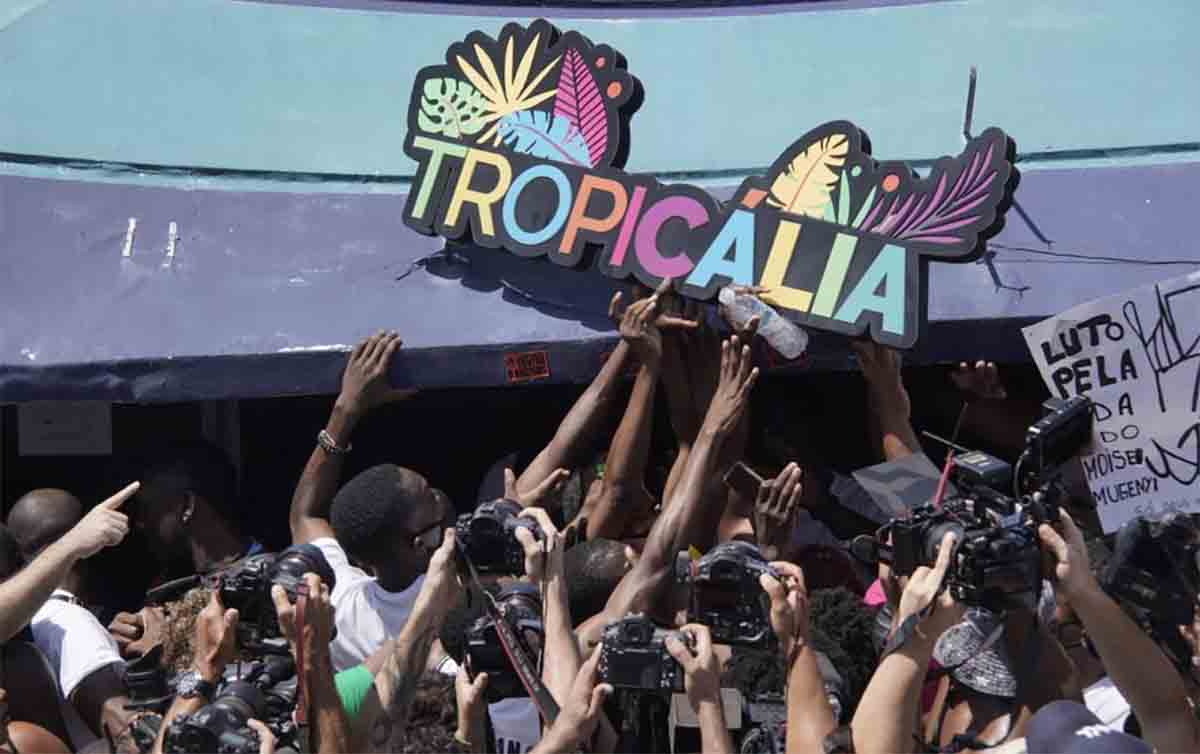
Protesters in Rio de Janeiro removed a sign from the Tropicália kiosk

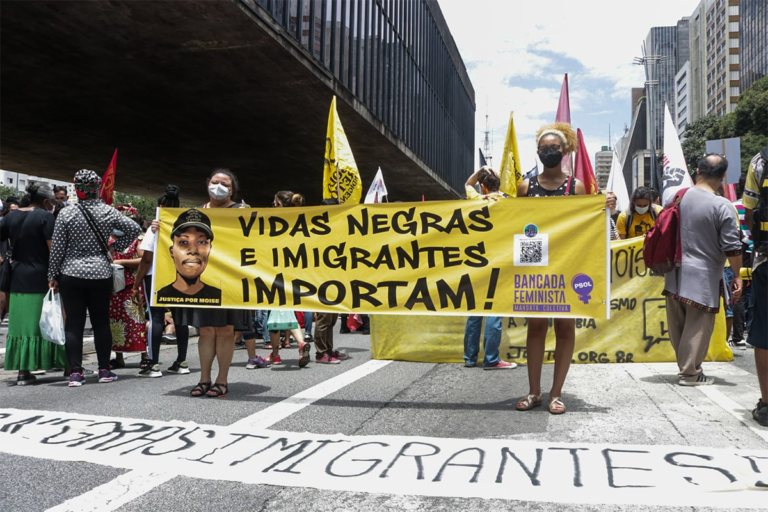
Protesters in Avenida Paulista, São Paulo.

On January 29, 2022, friends and family of Moïse Mugenyi Kabagambe protested near the kiosk and condemned the crime. In the early morning of February 3, a demonstration with 50 people was near the Tropicália kiosk was reported.

Protests were held on February 5 in several Brazilian cities, including Rio de Janeiro, São Paulo, Salvador, Brasília, São Luís, Porto Alegre, e Belo Horizonte, Recife, Cuiabá, Curitiba, and Palmas. Outside the country, protests were scheduled to occur in New York City and London. Deutsche Welle reported there was a demonstration near the Brazilian embassy in Berlin. Besides calling for justice for Kabagambe, the protests denounced racism, xenophobia, and police brutality against Black people in the country. There was also calls for the impeachment of Jair Bolsonaro.

=== Incidents ===
In Rio de Janeiro, Brazilian journalist Manoel Soares was reportedly harassed by White Brazilians when he was near the protest in the Barra da Tijuca district.

In Curitiba, there was some confusion between protesters and religious people. The protesters were in the city's downtown district near the Church of Our Lady of the Rosary of the Black Men of Saint Benedict, where a mass was underway. The priest and the protesters argued, and the protesters invaded the church and protested there for a few minutes. No damage was done to the church or the congregation.

Videos of the church invasion were widely shared on social media. The Roman Catholic Archdiocese of Curitiba criticized the protesters' actions, as did President Jair Bolsonaro, who until then had not commented on the killing of Kabagambe. Local politicians were also criticized because of their involvement with the protests. Councilwoman Carol Dartora (PT) participated in the protests, but was not part of the group who invaded the church; she, however, received hateful and racist messages from people who associated her with the church invasion. Councilman Renato Freitas (PT) was with the group who invaded the church; he was criticized during a session of the Curitiba City Council by councilmen Osias Moraes (Republicanos) and Tico Kuzma (Pros), he was impeached but the impeachment was suspended by Justice Court.

== See also ==
- Crime in Brazil
