= Civil Police Museum (Rio de Janeiro) =

Museum in Brazil

- Museu da Polícia Civil
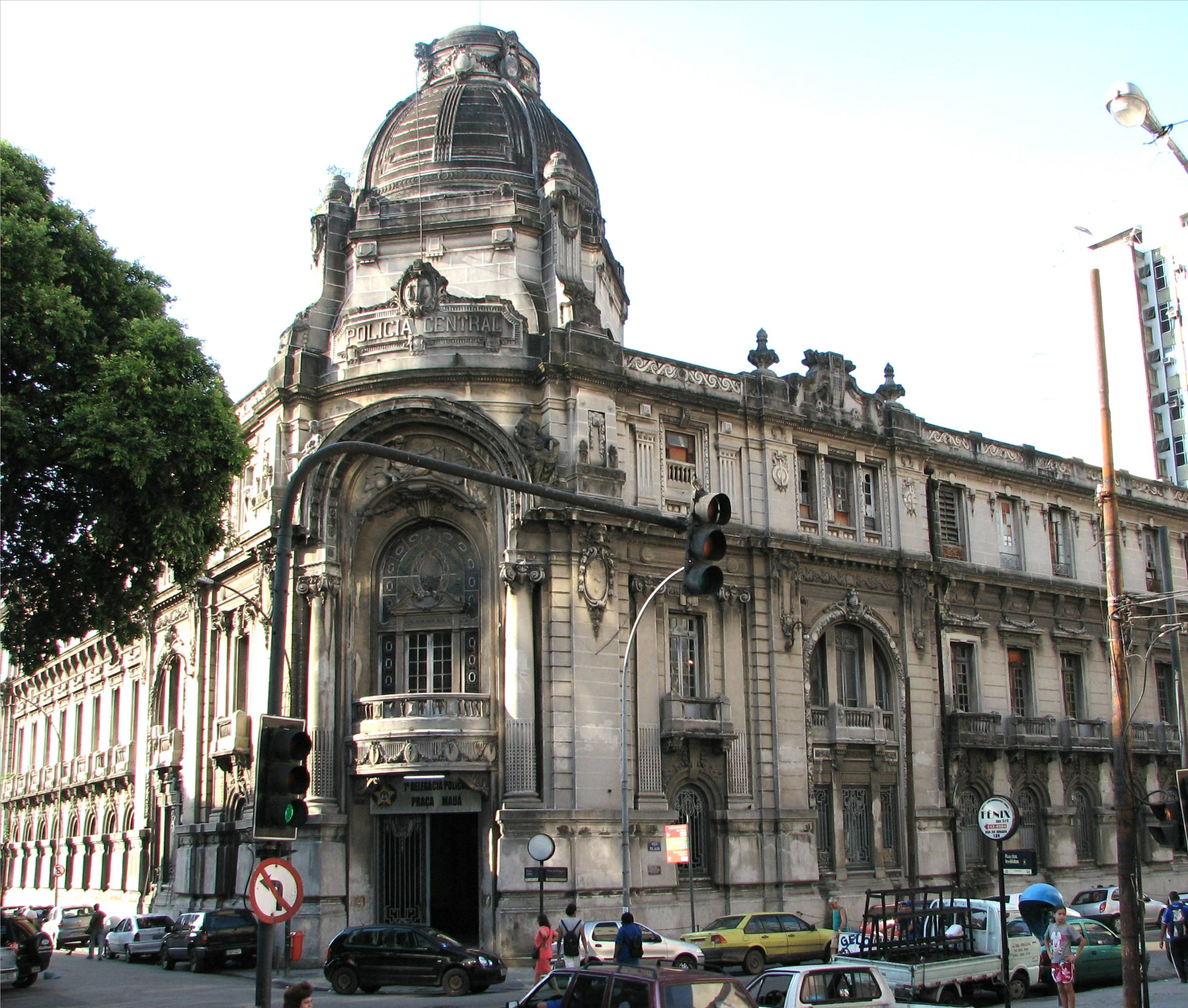
- Police Museum
- Established: 1912
- Location: Rio de Janeiro, Brazil
- Coordinates: 22.910556°S 43.185°W
- Director: Cyro Advincula da Silva
- Architect: Heitor de Mello
- Owner: State of Rio de Janeiro
- Website: policiacivil.rj.gov.br/museu/museo1.htm
- Museum Collection of Black Magic

National Historic Heritage of Brazil
- Designated: 1938
- Reference no.: 35

The Rio de Janeiro Civil Police Museum (Portuguese: Museu da Polícia Civil) is a historical museum in Rio de Janeiro, Brazil. It organizes and promotes permanent and temporary exhibitions of documents and items that portray the activities of Civil Police in the history of Rio de Janeiro since colonial times. It was founded in 1912 and was initially used only for the instruction of police academy students, but opened to the public in the 1930s. The museum is headquartered in a French eclectic style building constructed in 1910 by the architect Heitor de Mello. It is registered under the International Council of Museums as a scientific museum.

== Collections ==
The museum is divided into collections related to:

- the establishment of the police force and its history
- uniformed police in the former federal capital
- technical police
- the former political police
- initial communications
- "forbidden games"
- firearms and armament

The museum also contains materials confiscated from the fascist Brazilian Integralism movement; items related to the Nazi movement in Brazil, specifically flags, streamers, and "children's shoes with a swastika cross design"; and printed materials confiscated from the Brazilian Communist Party.

== Museum Collection of Black Magic ==
The Museum Collection of Black Magic (Portuguese: Coleção Museu de Magia Negra) was formed at the Civil Police Museum in the 1920s to house religious objects related to Afro-Brazilian religions, specifically those of Candomblé and Umbanda traditions. The police were charged with the suppression of baixo espiritismo, or low spiritism under the revised penal code of the First Republic; anti-sorcery and witchcraft statutes were issued on 11 October 1890. Items were confiscated from Candomblé terreiros, which were viewed variously as disruptive, sinister, or grotesque. The terreiros were also viewed as sympathetic to Communism.

Mario de Andrade, the creator of SPHAN, now the National Institute of Historic and Artistic Heritage, added the collection to the initial list of national heritage monuments in 1938. As a result, the Museum Collection of Black Magic was the first protected ethnographic collection in Brazil.

The Museum Collection of Black Magic has not been exhibited to the public since 1999.

== See also ==
- CORE (special operations)
- Civil Police Museum of the State of São Paulo
