= GOE =

GOE or Goe may refer to:

== Special forces ==
- Special Operations Group (Brazil), a police tactical unit of the Civil Police of the state of São Paulo
- Special Operations Group (Argentina) (Spanish: Grupo de Operaciones Especiales), of the Argentine Air Force
- Special Operations Group (Portugal) (Portuguese: Grupo de Operações Especiais), of the Portuguese Public Security Police
- Special Operations Groups (Spain) (Spanish: Grupo de Operaciones Especiales), of the Spanish Army

== Other uses ==
- Field Flowers Goe (1832–1910), Australian Anglican bishop
- Gaussian orthogonal ensemble, a random matrix ensemble
- Go (airline), a defunct British airline, with ICAO code GOE
- Go (game), or goe, an abstract strategy game
- Goldthorpe railway station, in England
- Gongduk language, spoken in Bhutan, with ISO 639–3 code GOE
- Gouais blanc, a French wine grape
- Government Olympic Executive, of the United Kingdom
- Government-owned enterprise
- Grade of execution in figure skating
- Great Oxygenation Event, the Paleoproterozoic surge in atmospheric oxygen
- God Over Everything, a 2016 album by Patoranking

== See also ==
- Go (disambiguation)
