= Adolfo Morales de los Ríos =

Spanish architect (1858–1928)

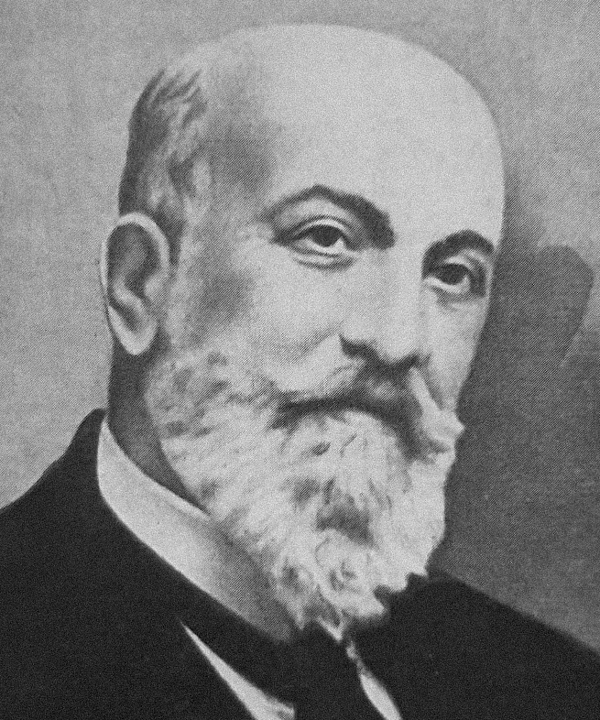
- Born: Adolfo Morales de los Ríos y García de Pimentel; 10 March 1858; Seville, Spain
- Died: 3 September 1928 (aged 70); Rio de Janeiro, Brazil
- Education: École des Beaux-Arts
- Occupation: Architect
- Children: Adolfo Morales de los Ríos Filho
- Buildings: Escola Nacional de Belas Artes (now Museu Nacional de Belas Artes); Supreme Federal Court Building (now Centro Cultural Justiça Federal); Gran Teatro Falla
- Projects: Central Avenue commissions, Rio de Janeiro

Adolfo Morales de los Ríos y García de Pimentel (10 March 1858 – 3 September 1928) was a Spanish architect, urbanist, and professor. Initially active in Spain and France, he built most of his career in Brazil, becoming one of the principal architects of the Belle Époque in Rio de Janeiro.

== Biography ==
Born in Sevilla, he was the son of the military officer Adolfo Morales de los Rios e de Salud Pimentel y Garcia de Ambues. He studied architecture at the Beaux-Arts de Paris, graduating in 1882. As a student, he partook in the preparations of the Spanish section at the 1878 Exposition Universelle, and became acquainted with Eugène Viollet-le-Duc. He began his professional career in Paris but soon moved to Spain, where he designed the Gran Casino de San Sebastián. Together with Luis Aladrén, he presented a project for the design of the Banco de España which won the first accésit in the competition, but he was not among the architects of the building.

In 1884, together with Adolfo Castillo, he designed the Gran Teatro Falla, a work in the Neo-Mudéjar style. In 1889, he was invited to found an architectural school in Chile, but later abandoned the project, and decided to establish himself in Rio de Janeiro after visiting Recife and Salvador. He presented urban reform proposals and designed markets and bridges, and oversaw the construction of railways and highways. In 1897, he won a public competition to become professor at the National School of Fine Arts, where he taught architectural drawing, as well as the history and theory of architecture. Among his students were Lúcio Costa, Heitor de Mello, Attilio Corrêa Lima, and Archimedes Memoria.

From 1904 to 1906, Morales de los Ríos accepted major commissions along the newly inaugurated Central Avenue, planned as a symbol of the country's modernization. He designed the house of the influential newspaper O Paiz, the Café Mourisco, which was a Persian revival restaurant, and the seat of the Supreme Federal Court in the eclectic style. In the Independence Centenary International Exposition held in 1922, he designed the so-called Monumental Gate, which remained unbuilt, and the Amusement Park, in which he blended inspirations from the Classical world and the Brazilian fauna and flora.

Morales de los Ríos was portrayed by Candido Portinari, and Manuel Bandeira wrote in his honor after his death. His son, Adolfo Morales de los Ríos Filho, was an architect, intellectual, and professor who wrote extensively on architecture, having authored the two-volume Teoria e Filosofia da Arquitetura.

== Gallery ==
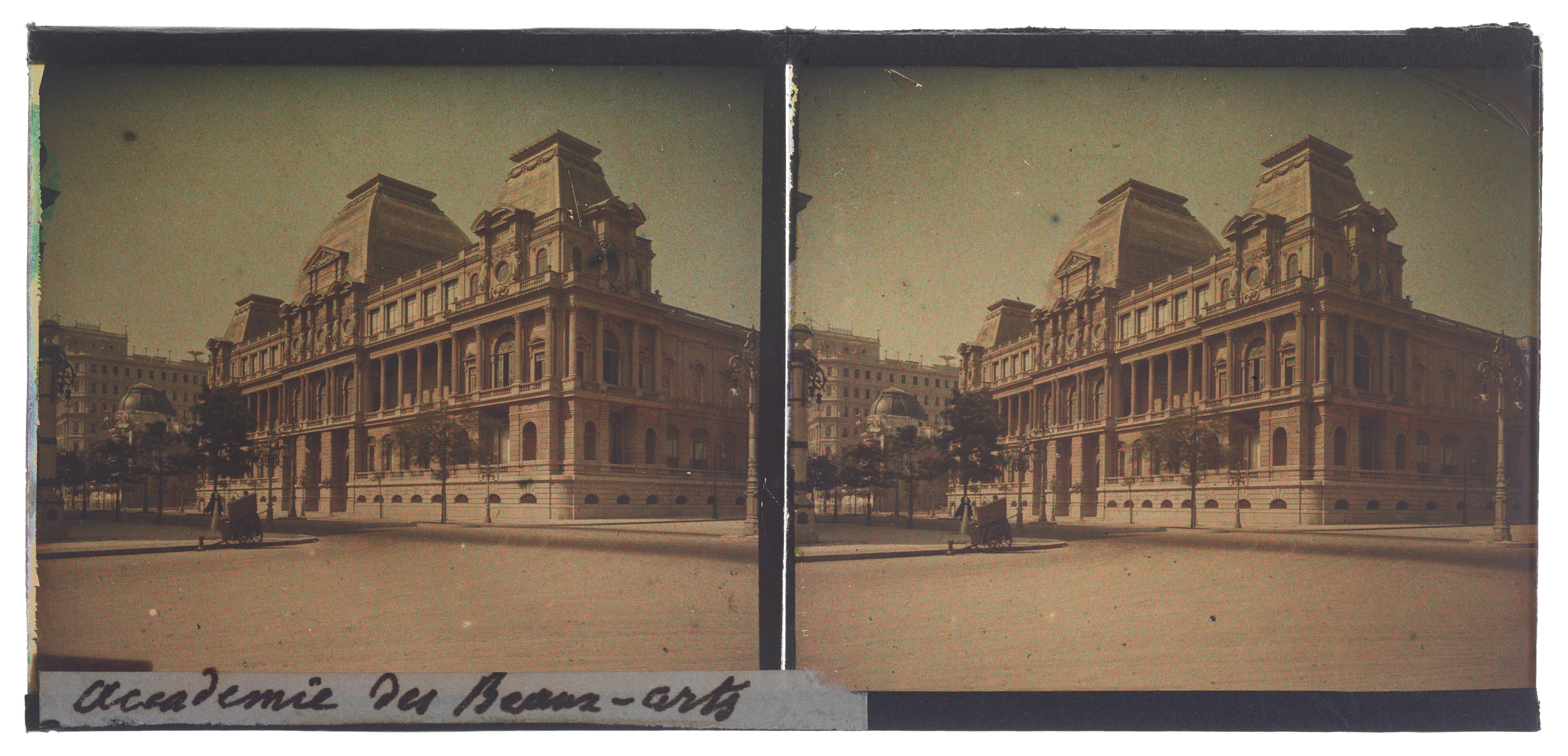
The former building of the School of Fine Arts, now home to the National Museum of Fine Arts.

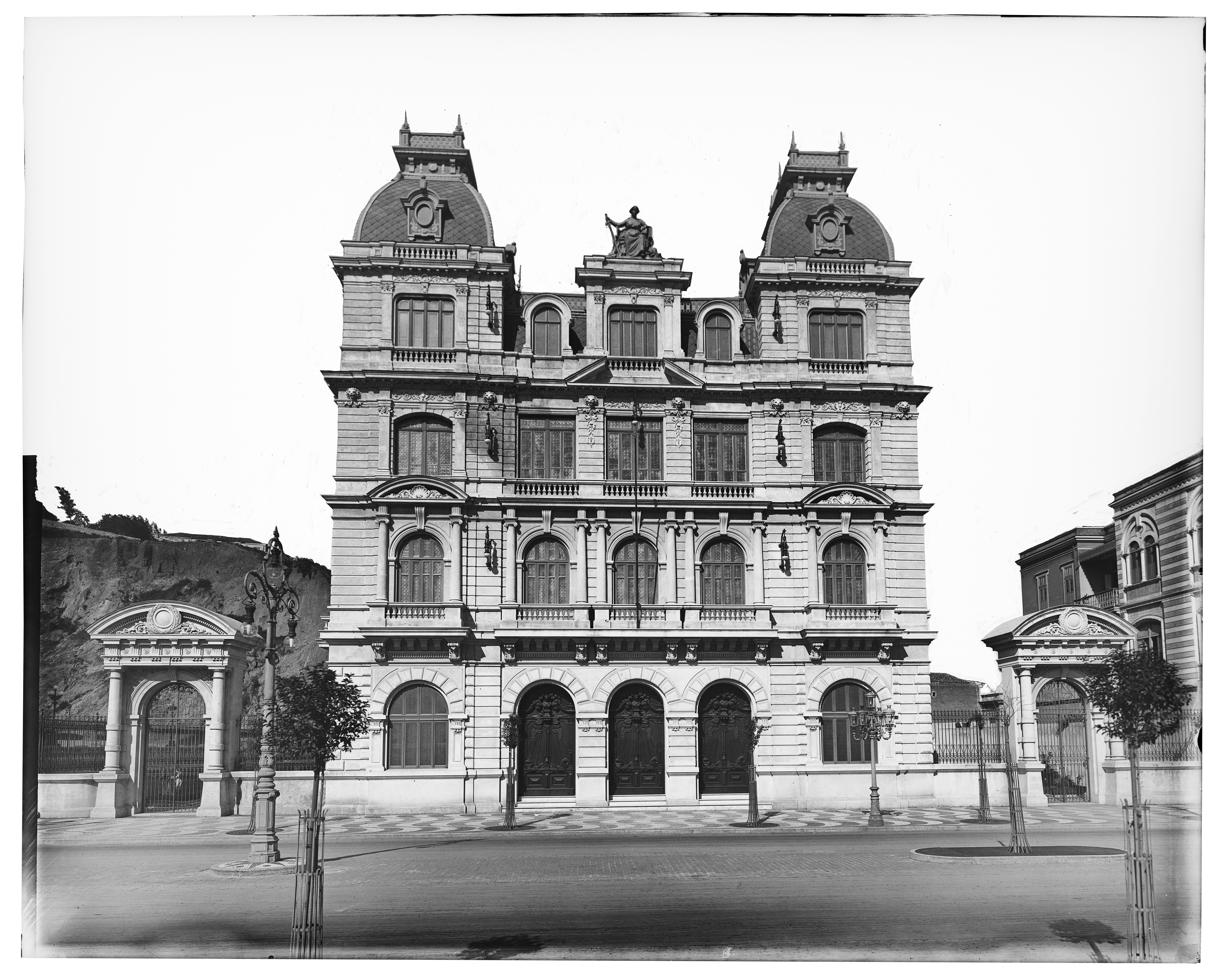
The former building of the Supreme Federal Court, now the Centro Cultural Justiça Federal.

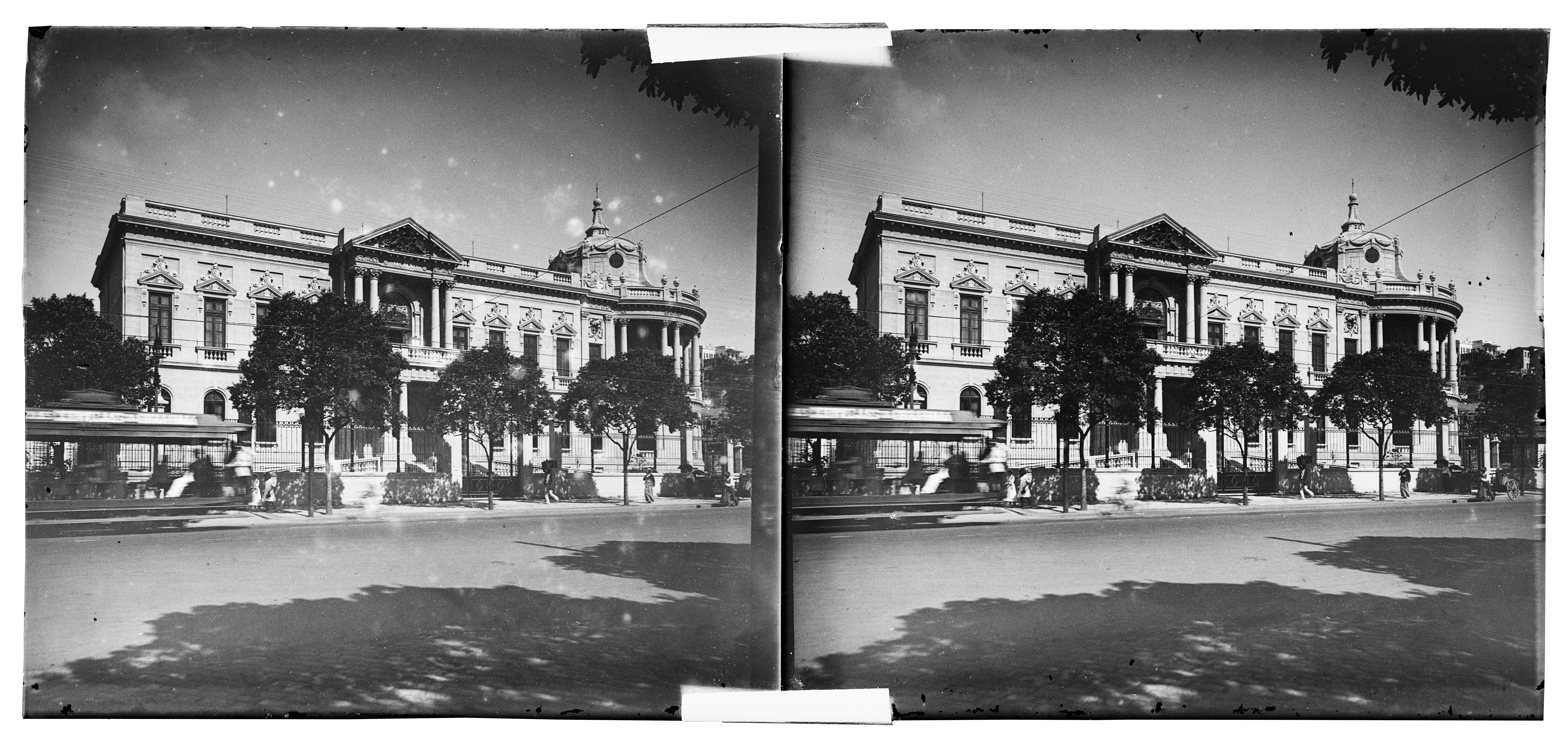
The São Joaquim Palace, in the Glória neighbourhood.

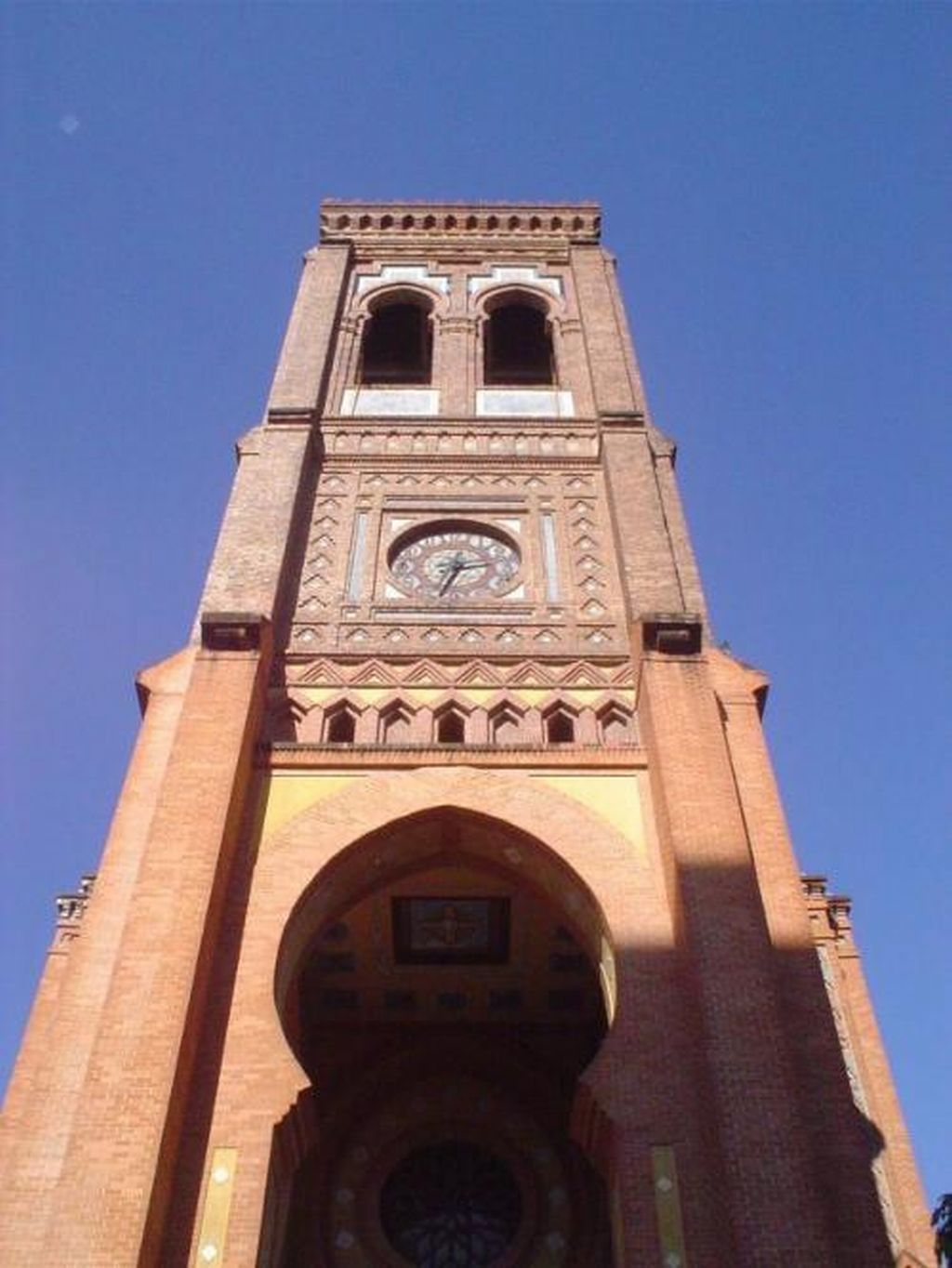
The Church of the Immaculate Heart of Mary, in the Méier neighbourhood.

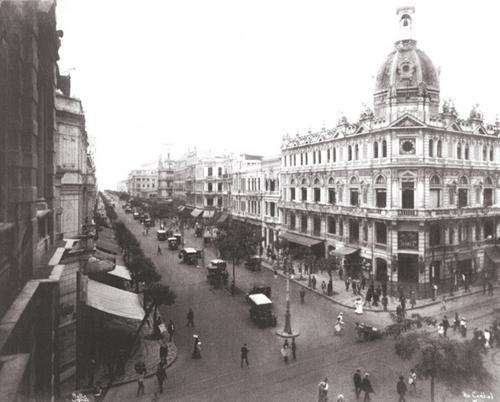
The headquarters of the newspaper O Paiz. It was set on fire and destroyed during the Revolution of 1930.

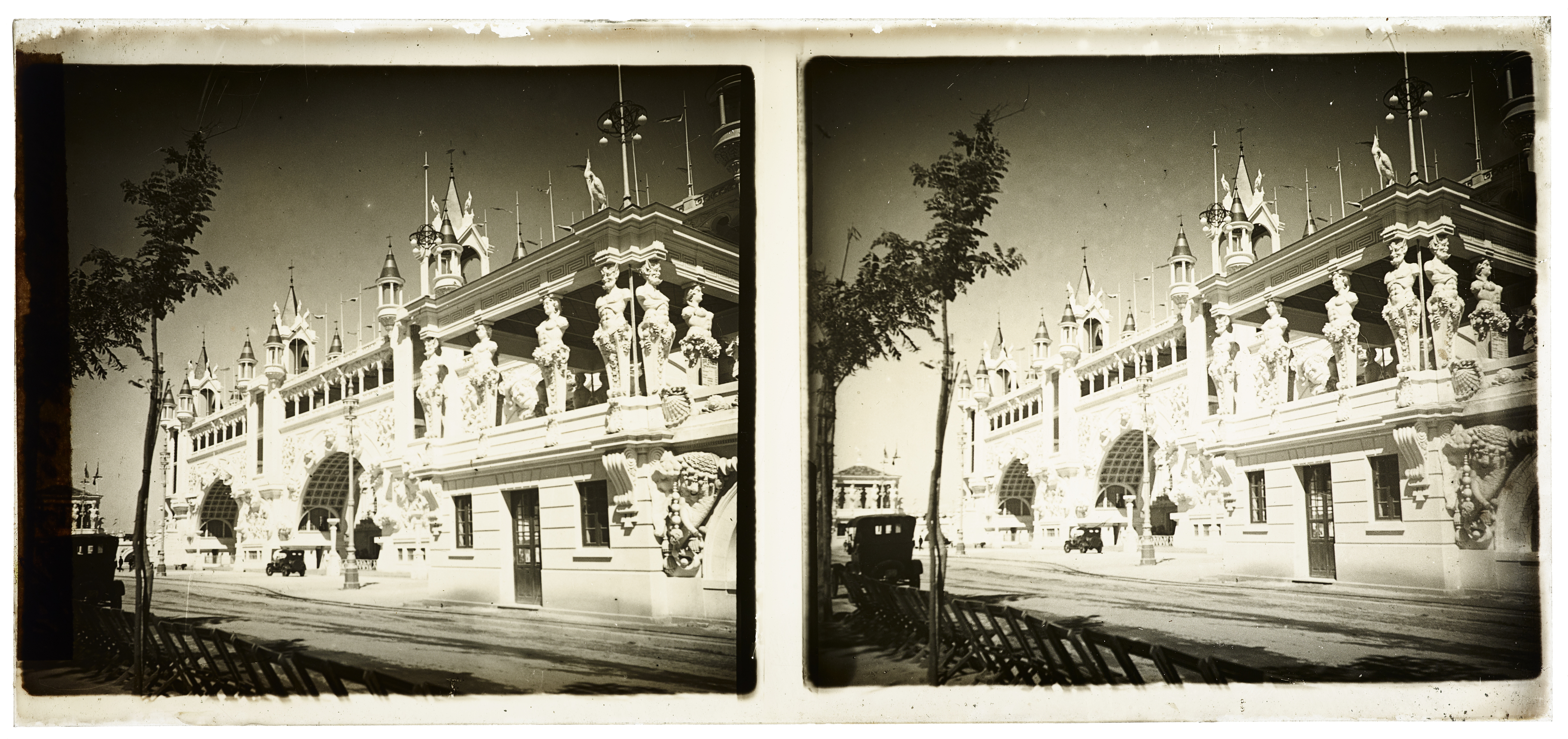
Amusement Park of the 1922 Independence Centenary International Exposition.
