= Civil Police (Brazil) =

Investigative state police in Brazil

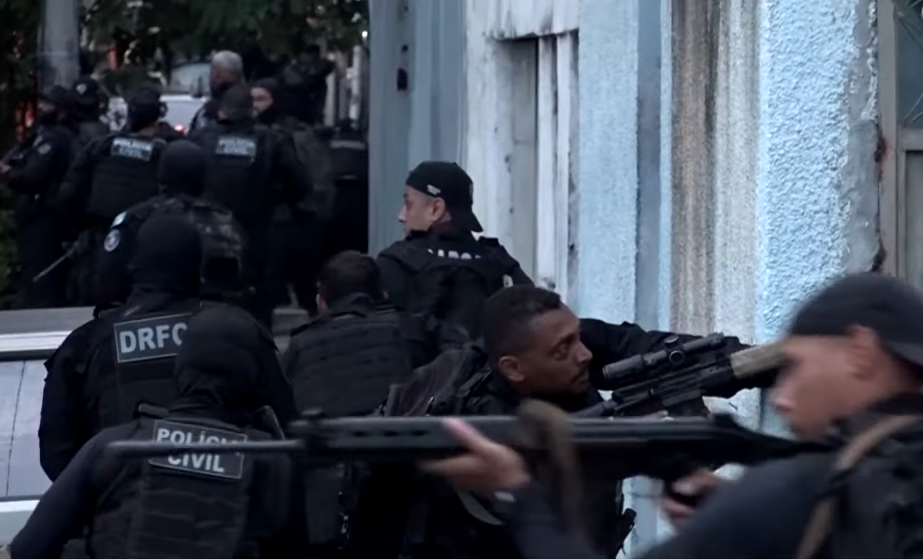
Rio de Janeiro State Civil Police Cargo Theft and Robbery Police Precinct during Operation Containment in 2025

In Brazil, the Civilian Police (Portuguese: Polícia Civil) is the name of the investigative state police forces.

The Civilian Police are agencies of the public administration of the states and of the Federal District of Brazil, whose function is, under Article 144 of the Federal Constitution of 1988, public security and the preservation of the public order, the safety of the people and of the patrimony.

Each of the states and the Federal District has its own civilian police department, which carries out detective work, forensics and criminal investigation, acting as a state bureau of investigation, while the "military police" carry out preventive police duties. Some states also have a "Scientific Police" specialized in forensic science and working together, but separate from the institution of the Civil Police.

It aims at the exercise of functions of judiciary police and the exercise of activities of administrative and security police, which are indispensable to the preservation of the juridical order, to the (promotion of the) harmonic life of the community, and to guarantee citizens' rights and liberty.

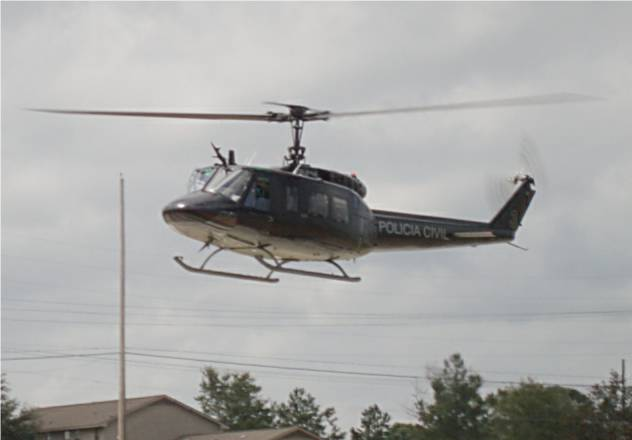
Police helicopter - Rio de Janeiro

== Description ==
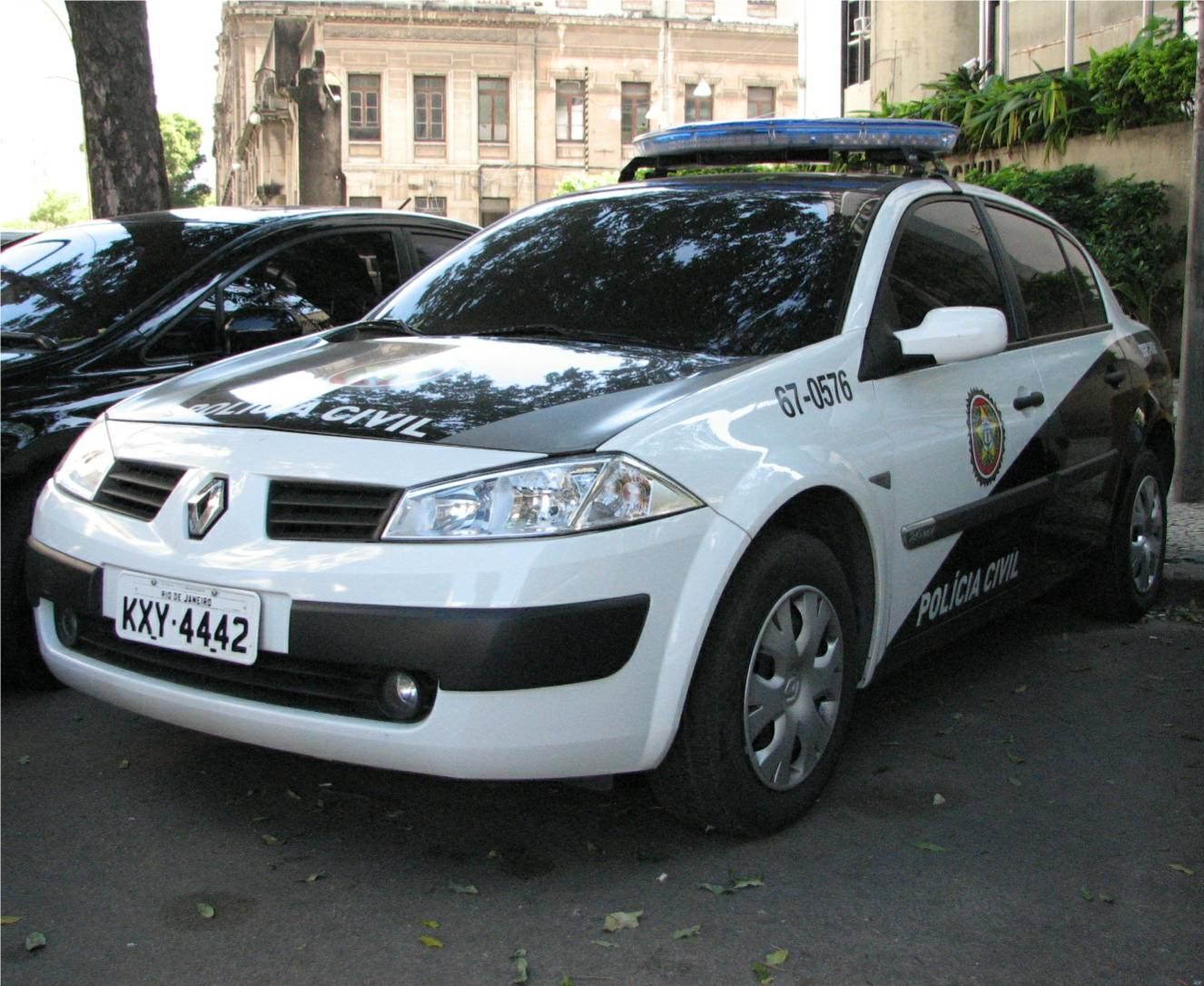
A civil police car - Rio de Janeiro

The Civilian Police of Brazil had origin in the General Intendancy of Police, created in Rio de Janeiro in 1808.

With the transference of the Portuguese Royal Family to Brazil in 1808, the police started to be regulated, have structure and important social role.

The Police General Intendancy of the Court and the State of Brazil (Intendência Geral de Polícia da Corte e do Estado do Brasil, in Portuguese) was created by charter of D. João VI on May 10 of that year, centralizing the police attributes of competence belonging to several authorities such as Ouvidor Geral, the alcaydes, the quadrilheiros and the road and assaults captains.

The first Police General Superintendent was Councilor Paulo Fernandes Viana who organized the police administration in Rio de Janeiro city as it used to be in Lisbon.

The Police General Intendancy went through the phase of the Brazilian politic emancipation movement which finally culminated on September 7, 1822.

Civilian Police had been gradually developing for all country during the governments Imperial and Republican. Today, the constitutional existence of the Civilian Police and its attributions elapse of article 144, IV and 144 § 4°, of the Federal Constitution.

== Organization ==
Each of the 26 states plus the Federal district has its own Civil Police force. They are each directed by a Chief of Police, chosen from among commissioned career officers.

The services of judiciary police are performed through individual precincts that have jurisdiction over entire towns or small cities as well as sections of large cities.

== Basic organic structure ==
- Police Superior Council

A collegiate organ

- Cabinet

Direct assistance of the Police Chief

- Planning and Police Operations Department

Operational planning

- General Office of Police

Fiscalization

- Police State Academy

Professional formation

- Police Departments

Operational organs

- Administration Department

Administrative support

- Technical-Scientific Department

Technical-scientific support (in some states, this is a separated organization)

== Special investigations ==
Special Investigations Department serves as the intelligence arm of the state police, overseeing complex criminal investigations, dignitary protection, and tactical units such as CORE GOE, which deploy specialized officers for high-risk operations.

== Police inquiry ==
The function of Judiciary Police is exercised through the police inquiry, included in the Brazilian prosecution law in order to investigate the penal infractions and their responsibility. When concluded the inquiry is sent to the criminal judge.

== Hierarchic degrees ==
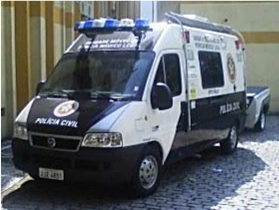
Mobile Forensic Unit - Rio de Janeiro

Police Authority

- Commissioner of Police (Delegado/Comissário) = A (Deputy Sheriff) and a Magistrate. It is demanded to a Commissioner of Police be: A Bachelor of Laws & have a minimum of three years of legal or police experience.

Agents of the Authority

- Notary of Police (Escrivão)
- Agent, Investigator or Inspector (Agente, Investigador ou Inspetor)

Police Specialists

- CSI - Crime Scene Investigator (Perito Criminal)

Note: In several Brazilian states, Police Specialists (Expert Criminal) direct an unattended Police Department, generally called "Scientific Police" or "Technical Police", responsible for criminal expertise at the respective state.

== Civil police of Brazil ==
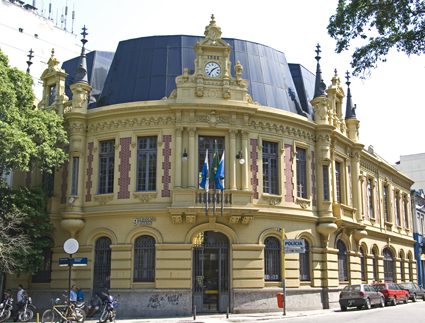
Police station - Rio de Janeiro

- Polícia Civil do Distrito Federal - Brasília
- Polícia Civil do Estado do Acre
- Polícia Civil do Estado de Alagoas
- Polícia Civil do Estado do Amapá
- Polícia Civil do Estado do Amazonas
- Polícia Civil do Estado da Bahia
- Polícia Civil do Estado do Ceará
- Polícia Civil do Estado do Espírito Santo
- Polícia Civil do Estado de Goiás
- Polícia Civil do Estado do Maranhão
- Polícia Civil do Estado do Mato Grosso
- Polícia Civil do Estado do Mato Grosso do Sul
- Polícia Civil do Estado de Minas Gerais
- Polícia Civil do Estado do Pará
- Polícia Civil do Estado da Paraíba
- Polícia Civil do Estado do Paraná
- Polícia Civil do Estado de Pernambuco
- Polícia Civil do Estado do Piauí
- Polícia Civil do Estado do Rio Grande do Norte
- Polícia Civil do Estado do Rio Grande do Sul
- Polícia Civil do Estado do Rio de Janeiro
- Polícia Civil do Estado de Rondônia
- Polícia Civil do Estado de Roraima
- Polícia Civil do Estado de Santa Catarina
- Polícia Civil do Estado de São Paulo
- Polícia Civil do Estado de Sergipe
- Polícia Civil do Estado de Tocantins

== Weaponry ==
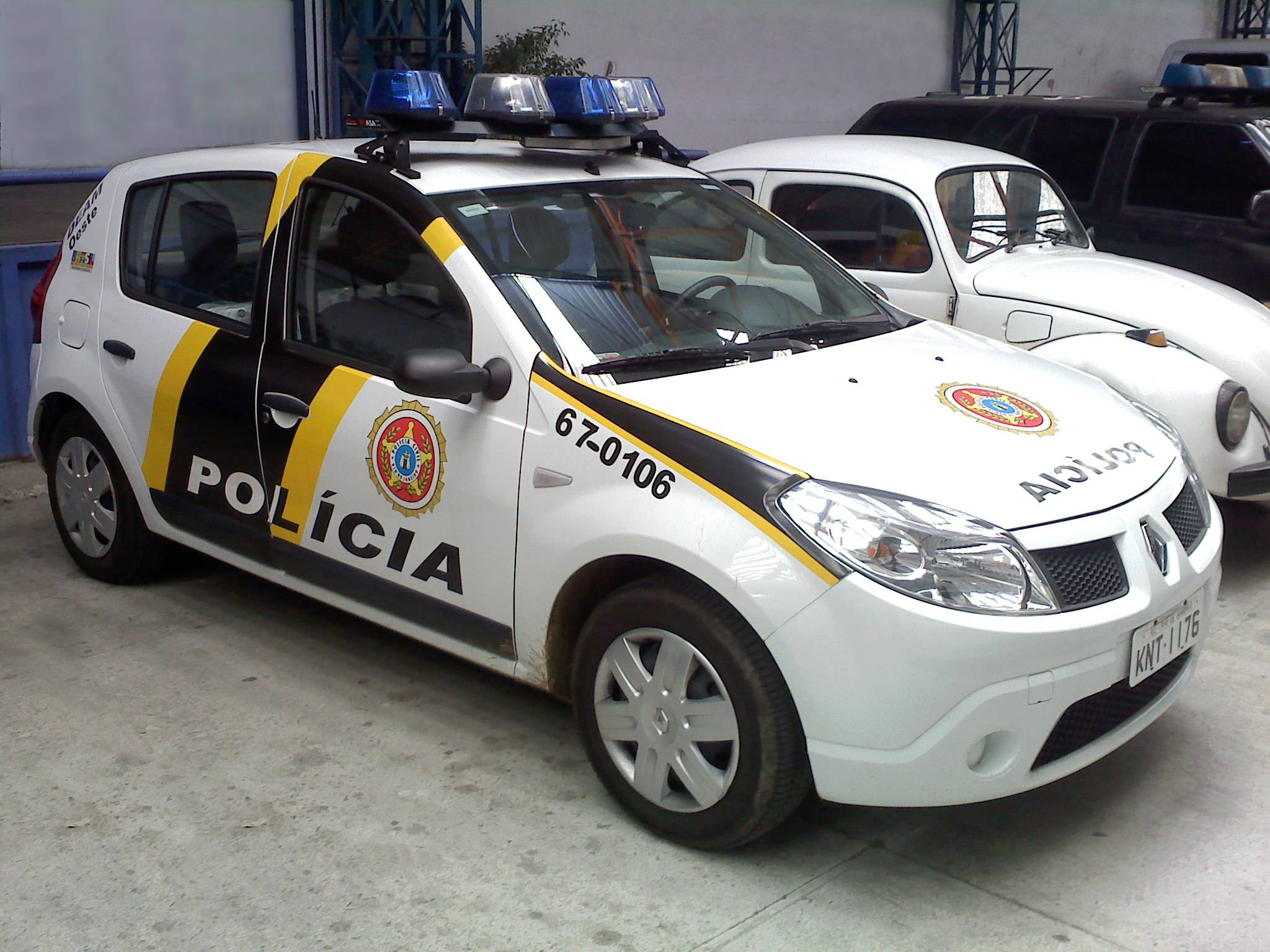
Rio de Janeiro

- Taurus pistols
- Glock pistols
- Colt pistols
- Smith & Wesson pistols
- Heckler & Koch MP5
- Colt M16A2
- Heckler & Koch G3

== See also ==
- Grupo de Operações Especiais (GOE)
- CORE (Brazil)
