= Civil Police of Rio de Janeiro State =

Police force in Rio de Janeiro, Brazil

Civil Police of Rio de Janeiro State Polícia Civil do Estado do Rio de Janeiro
- Coat of arms

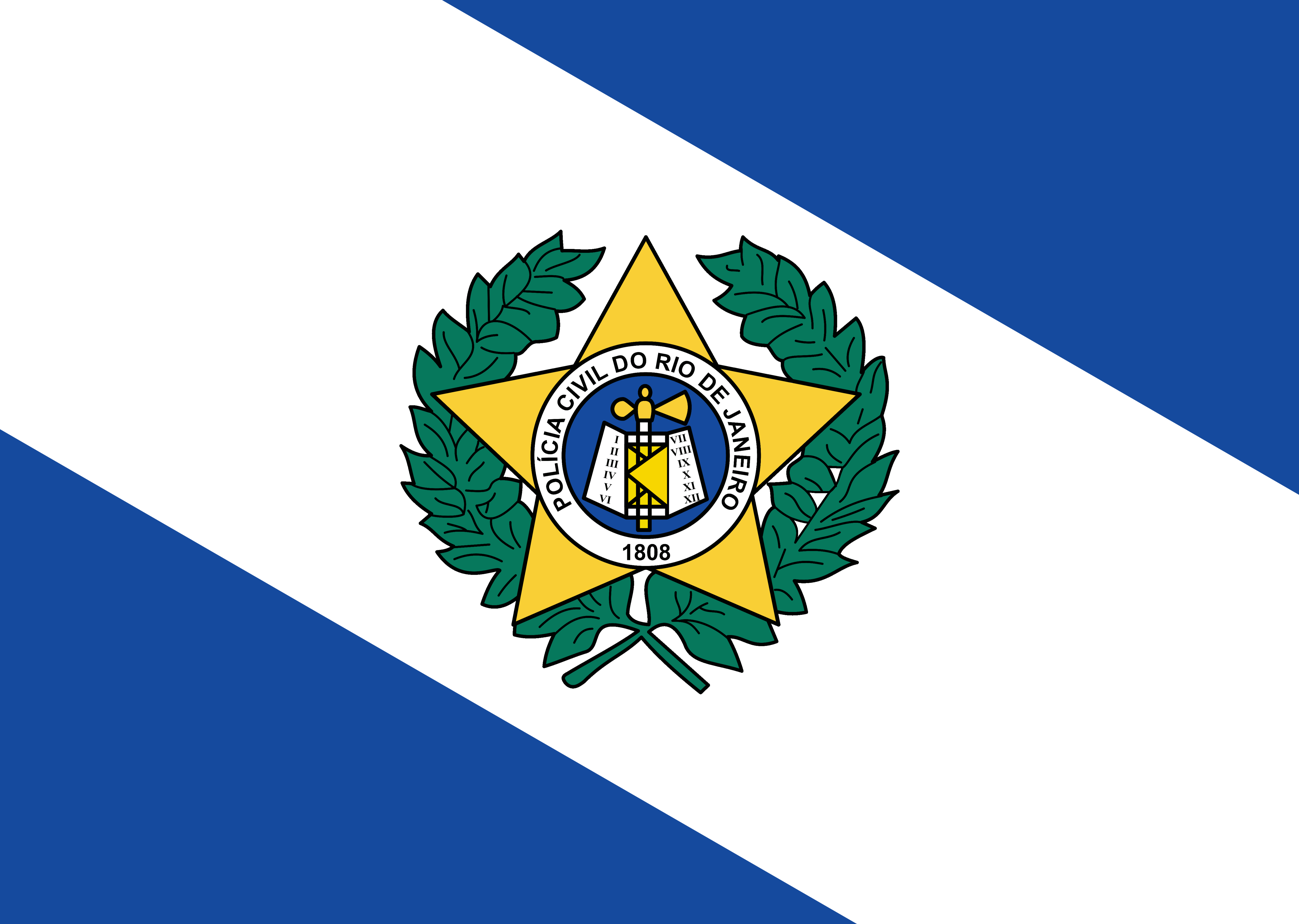
- Abbreviation: PCERJ

Agency overview
- Formed: 1808
- Employees: 12,000
- Annual budget: R$ 3,199,000,000.00 (2025)

Jurisdictional structure
- Operations jurisdiction: State of Rio de Janeiro
- Area: 43,696.1 km^{2}
- Population: 16,231,365 (2012)
- Legal jurisdiction: State of Rio de Janeiro
- Governing body: Rio de Janeiro State Government
- General nature: Civilian police

Operational structure
- Headquarters: Rio de Janeiro, Rio de Janeiro, Brazil
- Agency executive: Felipe Curi
- Parent agency: Military Police of Rio de Janeiro State

Facilities
- Airbases: Aeropolicial Support Service at Lagoa Rodrigo de Freitas, Rio de Janeiro

Website
- Official website (in Portuguese)

The Civil Police of Rio de Janeiro State (Portuguese: Polícia Civil do Estado do Rio de Janeiro, PCERJ) is the public security force of the executive branch of the state of Rio de Janeiro, Brazil. Responsible for the preservation of public order and the safety of people and property under Article 144 of the Federal Constitution of Brazil, it exercises the functions of investigative police (or judicial police) and investigates criminal offenses (except for military offenses) within its jurisdiction. Its jurisdiction covers the entire state of Rio de Janeiro.

Brazil has three police forces for each state: the Military Police (Polícia Militar), responsible for overt street patrolling; the Civil Police (Polícia Civil), responsible for criminal investigations; and the Prison Police (Polícia Penal), responsible for managing and controlling prisons and custody facilities. There are no municipal (city or district) police forces. Municipalities may establish Municipal Guards (Guardas Municipais); these are non-mandatory, often unarmed forces that support municipal administration and public order. As of 2025, Rio de Janeiro is arming its Municipal Guard. State highway police are organized as internal battalions of the Military Police. The Military Police are not directly subordinate to the Armed Forces but are named as such due to their internal military structure. They are considered reserve and auxiliary forces of the Brazilian Army.

Since January 2019, the PCERJ has held the status of a State Secretariat and is directly subordinate to the State Government, granting the organization its own budget and greater powers.

== History ==
Founded on March 1, 1565, the City of Rio de Janeiro had its first police official the very next year when Francisco Fernandes was appointed the minor alcaide (or minor alcalde) and city jailer (carcereiro da cidade).

1603 - the nascent police and judicial functions began to be governed by the Philippine Ordinances (Ordenações Filipinas), and in 1619 the Office of the Ouvidor-Geral (General Ombudsman/Magistracy) of Rio de Janeiro was established. In addition to administering justice, its duties included electing the ordinary or local judges (juízes ordinários ou da terra), inspecting prisons, and opening inquests (devassas - also meaning inquiries). The police activity was carried out by the alcaides, officials responsible for repressing criminal offenses, investigating and making arrests, always accompanied by a clerk who would draw up an official report of the occurrence, thus characterizing them as the first judicial police agents. Also from this period were the quadrilheiros, city residents in charge of policing the city by blocks or quarters, hence the name they received.

1808 - with the transfer of the Portuguese Royal Family to Brazil, the police began to become regularized, gain structure, and assume an important social role. On May 10 of that year, the General Police Intendancy of the Court and State of Brazil (Intendência Geral de Polícia da Corte e do Estado do Brasil) was installed in the city of Rio de Janeiro, centralizing the police attributions previously held by the Ouvidor-Geral, the alcaides, the quadrilheiros, and others. The first Intendant-General was Counselor Paulo Fernandes Viana, who began to organize the police administration following the model in Lisbon. By the notice of June 22 of the same year, the Police Secretariat (Secretaria de Polícia) was instituted, the first administrative structure of the Civil Police of Rio de Janeiro State, which, in addition to its proper police mission, was in charge of supervising public entertainment, vehicle and vessel registration, issuing passports, etc.

1841 - during the Imperial period, another important reorganization modified the face of the police apparatus. The figure of the Chief of Police (Chefe de Polícia) was created for the Municipality of the Court of Rio de Janeiro (already separated from the province of Rio de Janeiro) and for the Provinces (currently called States), along with the police division into districts, under the leadership of Delegates (delegados) and sub-delegates (subdelegados). The institution of the Police Inquiry (Inquérito Policial) (Law No. 2,033, of September 20, 1871), a modern conception for investigating criminal offenses and identifying their perpetrators, marked this period of police history.

After the Republic was proclaimed on November 15, 1889, the City of Rio de Janeiro, the former capital of the Empire, was renamed the Federal District. Law No. 947 of 1902 authorized the government to create the Civil Police of the Federal District (Polícia Civil do Distrito Federal). This Law and other complementary ones, besides giving the police its first major structure, influenced all subsequent reorganizations.

1944 - Civil Police of the Federal District was renamed the Federal Public Safety Department (DFSP) (Departamento Federal de Segurança Pública), a legal device to extend its powers to the entire national territory concerning maritime and border police, and political and social police. However, remaining the same institution, it continued to prioritize the exercise of judicial police and other public security services in the Federal District.

Among the initial innovations of the republican period, noteworthy were the career police system, public entrance exams, the development of technical police (forensics), the creation of the Police School in 1912, and the organization of the Federal District Civil Guard (Guarda Civil do Distrito Federal) in 1904, a uniformed police corporation that policed the City of Rio de Janeiro. See also: Federal District Civil Guard

1960 - with the creation of the state of Guanabara, as a result of the federal capital moving to Brasília, the Civil Police of the State of Guanabara (Polícia Civil do Estado da Guanabara), now within the sphere of state administration, became part of the structure of the State Public Security Secretariat. The reorganization of the police force copied the previous one and maintained the standard of efficiency by utilizing almost the entirety of the existing personnel.

1975 - the merger of the State of Guanabara with the State of Rio de Janeiro led to the union of both civil police forces, with a considerable increase in the territorial area of operation and the adoption of the name Civil Police of the State of Rio de Janeiro (Polícia Civil do Estado do Rio de Janeiro). In the 1980s, during the government of Leonel Brizola, autonomy was granted to the institution, with the creation of the State Secretariat of the Civil Police, which was abolished in 1995. In that year, the public security bodies were reunited under the direction of the new State Secretariat of Public Security, including the PCERJ. The structure then became the following: Detective-Inspector (Detetive-inspetor), Scribe (Escrivão), Fingerprint Expert/Papiloscopist (Papiloscopista), Detective (Detetive), Police Clerk (Escrevente), Police Driver (Motorista Polícia), Police Operator (Operador Policial), Police Telecommunications Operator (Operador Policial de Telecomunicações), Police Telecommunications Technician (Técnico Policial de Telecomunicações), and Jailer (Carcereiro).

1998 - With Rio de Janeiro State Law 2990 of 1998, the structure became the following: Helicopter Police Pilot (Piloto Policial) Police Inspector (Inspetor de Polícia), Scribe Officer (Oficial de Cartório), Police Investigator (Investigador de Polícia), Forensic Criminal Expert (Perito Criminal), Forensic Pathologist/Legal Medical Examiner (Perito Legista), Necropsy Technician (Técnico de Necropsia), Necropsy Assistant (Auxiliar de Necropsia), Fingerprint Expert/Papiloscopist (Papiloscopista), and Police Delegate/Chief of Police (Delegado de Polícia).

1999 - The "Programa Delegacia Legal" (Legal Police Station Program) was implemented, which was responsible for starting the process of computerization for the entire Civil Police of Rio de Janeiro. The program brought an internal restructuring to the Police Stations, introducing most of the space to be separated only by half-height partitions, similar to American police offices and investigation desks. Computers were implemented to replace typewriters. The "SCO - Operational Control System" software was created, which was responsible for producing the documents for Police Inquiries (Inquéritos Policiais) and In-Flagrante Arrest Reports (Autos de Prisão em Flagrante), in addition to controlling the administrative part of the Police Station in a single program. The SCO is currently used in 2025 and will be switched to "SIPOL".

2019 - With the extinction of the Public Security Secretariat, which was the body directly linked to the Governor of the State of Rio for security control, DECREE NO. 46.559 OF 2019, created the Civil Police Secretariat of the State of Rio de Janeiro (Secretaria de Polícia Civil do Estado do Rio de Janeiro). This granted the Civil Police of Rio de Janeiro the power of a Secretariat, a status it did not have when subordinated to the Security Secretariat. Secretariats are the highest relevant structural classification inside the State executive branch in Brazil and should not be confused with the federal structure. This allowed for its own budget and decisions regarding procurement and organizational and mission procedures to be made by the Civil Police itself.

2025 - Under the government of Claudio Castro, the State Complementary Law No. 224 of 2025 was published and the structure became the following:

Police Delegate (Delegado de Polícia);Civil Police Officer (Oficial de Polícia Civil); Forensic Pathologist/Legal Medical Examiner (Perito legista); Forensic Criminal Expert (Perito criminal); Fingerprint Expert (Perito Papiloscopista); Police Pilot (Piloto Policial); and Scientific Police Technician (Técnico de Polícia Científica).

The rank of Commissioner (Comissário) is an class to which Civil police officers who reach the 1st class of the career are promoted, and it cannot be accessed via public entrance examination (concurso, in Portuguese). There are no changes in functions between Commissioners and Civil Police Officers.

Trust positions follow different rules. The positions listed above are accessed through competitive civil service exams. Appointed positions are for individuals who already hold one of the positions and take on leadership duties. They are:

- Chief Officer of the Investigation Unit – Police officer in charge of a Police Station, This position is always held by a Civil Police officer, preferably—but not necessarily— a Commissioner.
- Chief Delegate(Delegado Titular) – The Chief delegate responsible for the Jurisdiction of the Police Station. This position is always held by a Police Delegate. Chief Officer of the Investigation Unit are subordinate to the Chief Delegate.
- Coordinators – Responsible for Coordination Bureau, which are parallel coordination structures to 'General Departments'. Coordinators are neither subordinate to nor supervisors of Delegates or Directors, but directly subordinated to the Secretary/Chief of Police.
- Directors – Serving as heads of General Departments/Bureau's. Each Police Station Chief Delegate reports to and is under the authority of a Director.
- Undersecretaries – They manage Undersecretariats. They are subordinate only to the Chief of Police and to the Governor. The Undersecretary of Intelligence, as an exception, may report directly to the State Governor.
- Secretary – In Rio de Janeiro, the Chief of Police is a Secretary, since the police functions as a Secretariat in order to have its own budget.

All leadership positions are held by career Police Delegates, except for the “Chief of the Investigation Unit.”

== Duties ==
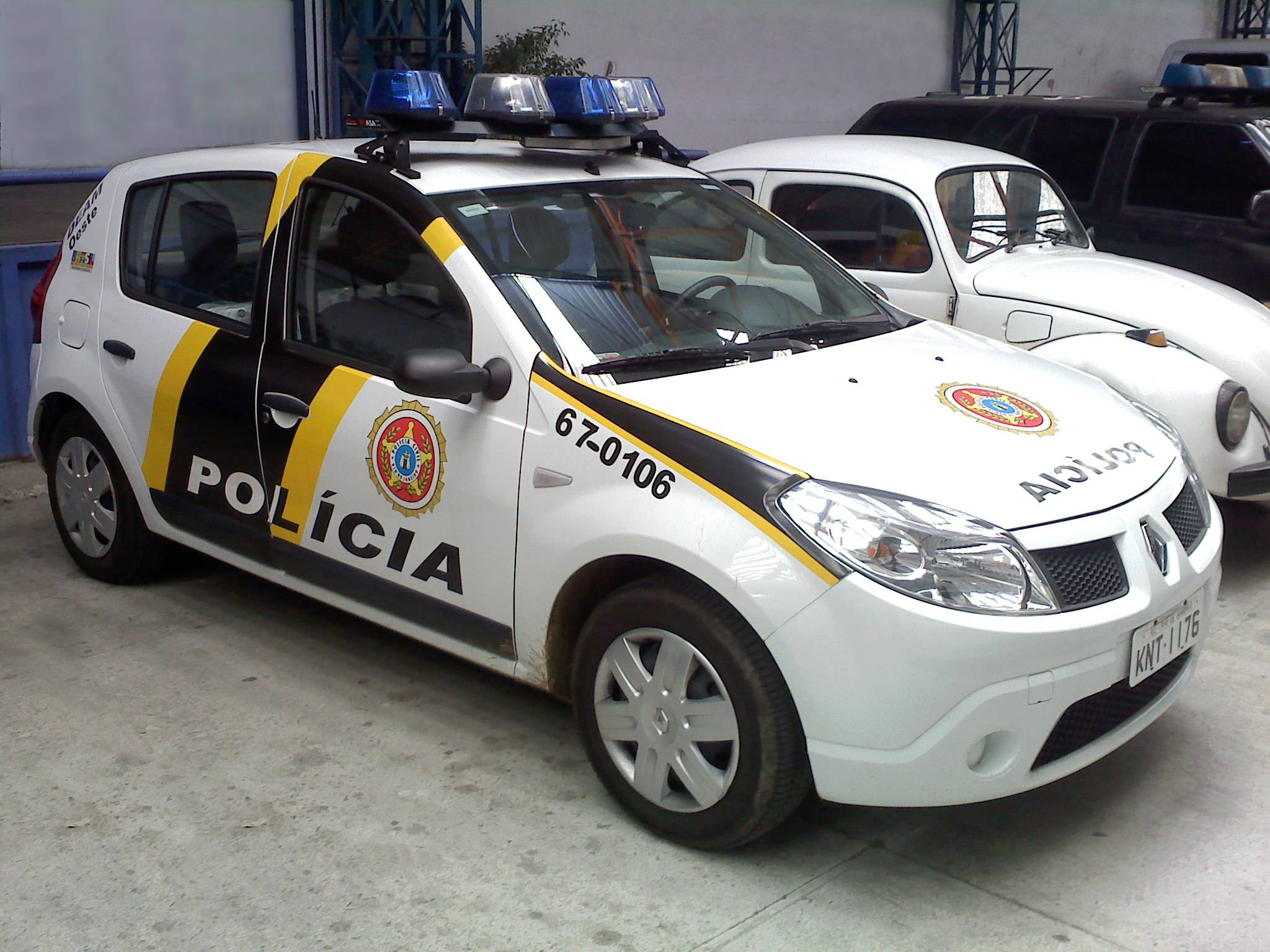
Police car with older graphics

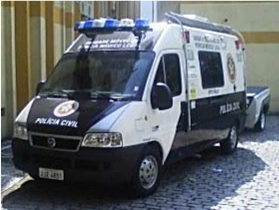
Mobile forensic unit

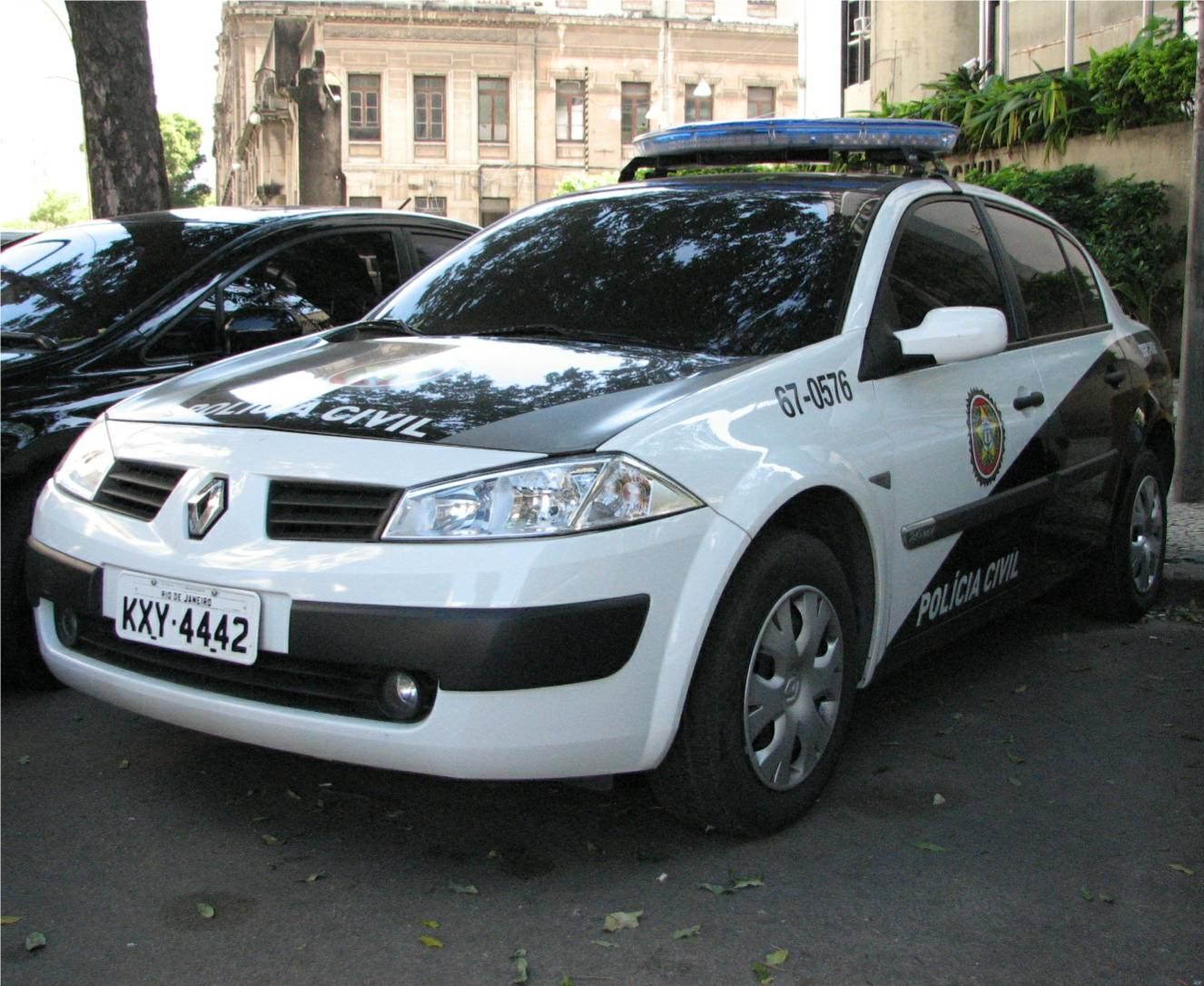
Police car, 2010

The prevention and repression of penal infractions are handled by police stations situated in police circumscriptions corresponding to the geographic areas of the Rio metropolitan region or the inland municipalities.

Each police station is directed by a police delegate, assisted by adjunct police delegates, chiefs of police groups, and police services.

Geographically, police stations are subordinate to one of the three major operational departments of the Police: the Capital (Rio de Janeiro city), the Baixada Fluminense (municipalities forming the Rio de Janeiro metropolitan area, excluding the capital), and the Interior (comprising ten regions).

Criminal investigations may be supported by the Specialized Police Department through its specialized divisions when investigating homicides with unknown perpetrators, narcotics, robbery, theft, and major fraud.

== Special Operations ==
The CORE (Coordenadoria de Recursos Especiais), formed in 1969, is a police tactical unit within the Civil Police of Rio de Janeiro.

It is a special service that uses highly trained officers for high-risk tasks.

== Career ==
- Police Delegate (Delegado de Polícia);
- Civil Police Officer (Oficial de Polícia Civil);
- Forensic Pathologist/Legal Medical Examiner (Perito legista);
- Forensic Criminal Expert (Perito criminal); Fingerprint Expert (Perito Papiloscopista);
- Police Pilot (Piloto Policial);
- Scientific Police Technician (Técnico de Polícia Científica).

== Gallery ==
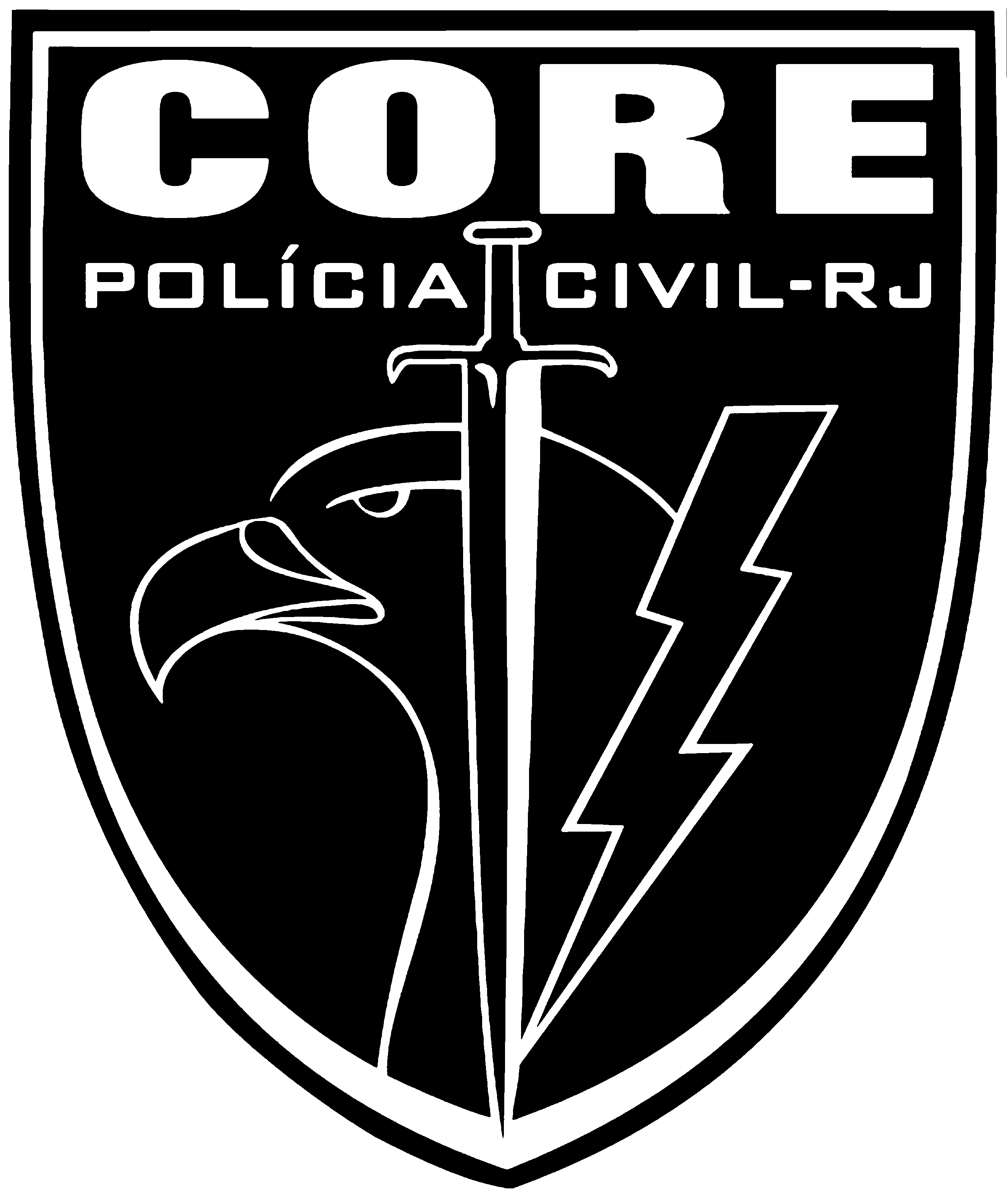
CORE – Coat of arms

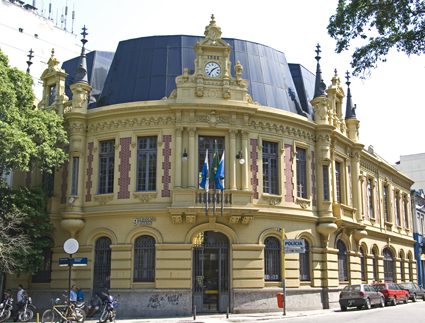
Police station

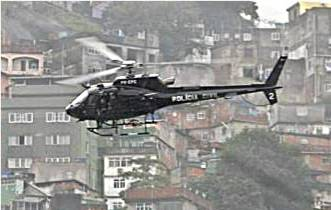
Police helicopter – Aguia 2

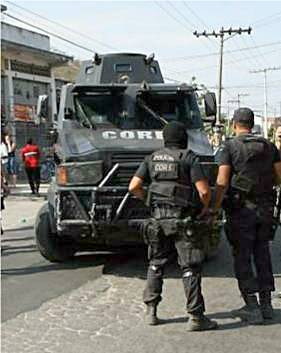
Armored vehicle

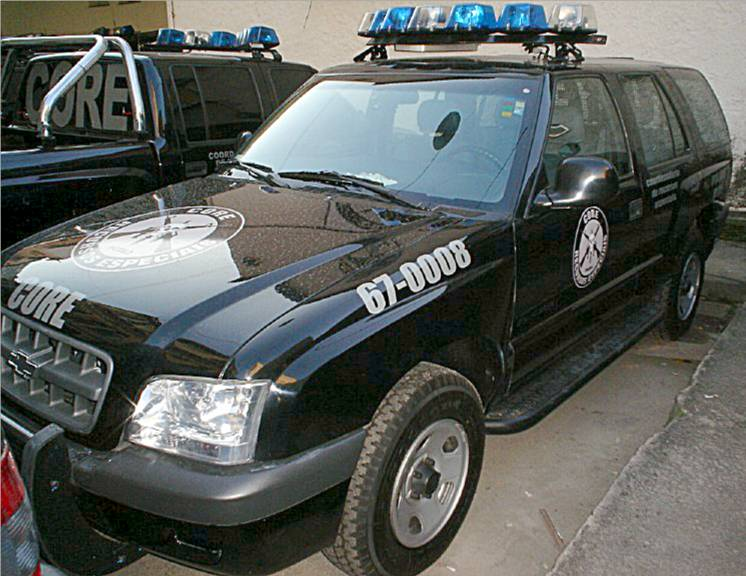
CORE – police car

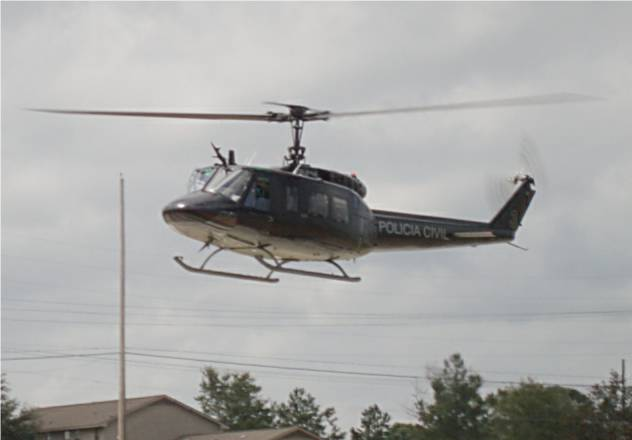
Police helicopter – Aguia 3

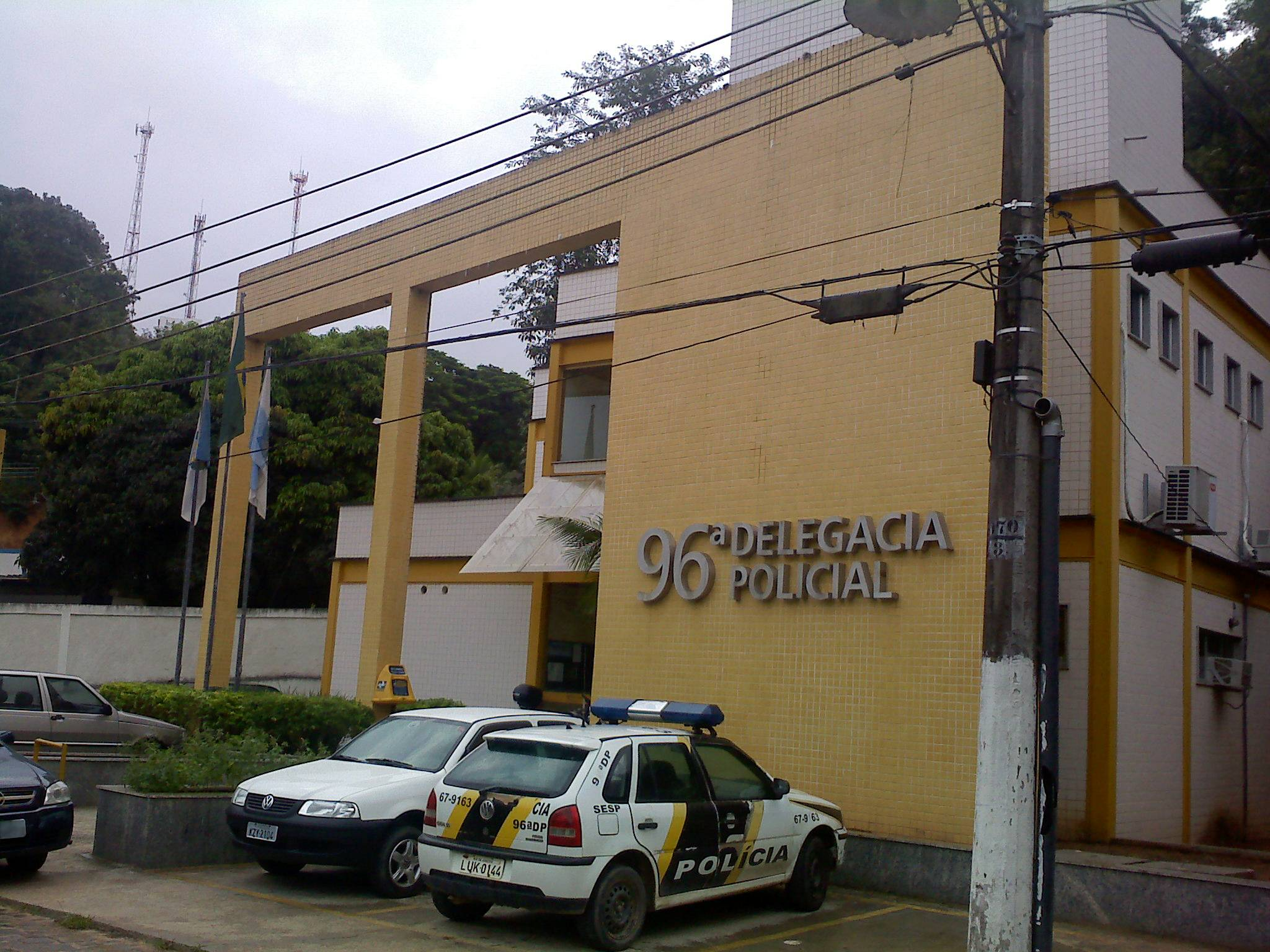
Police station

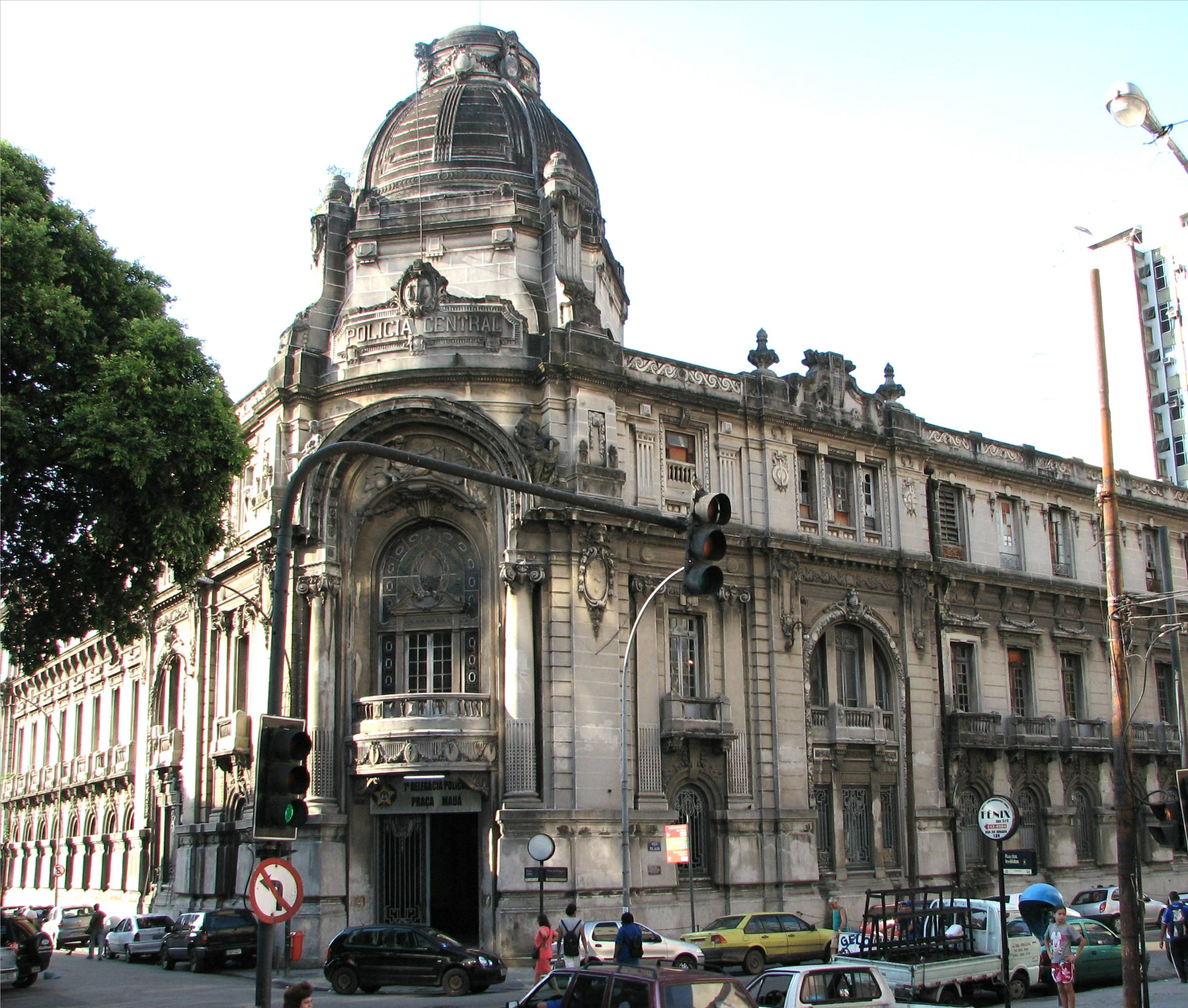
Police museum

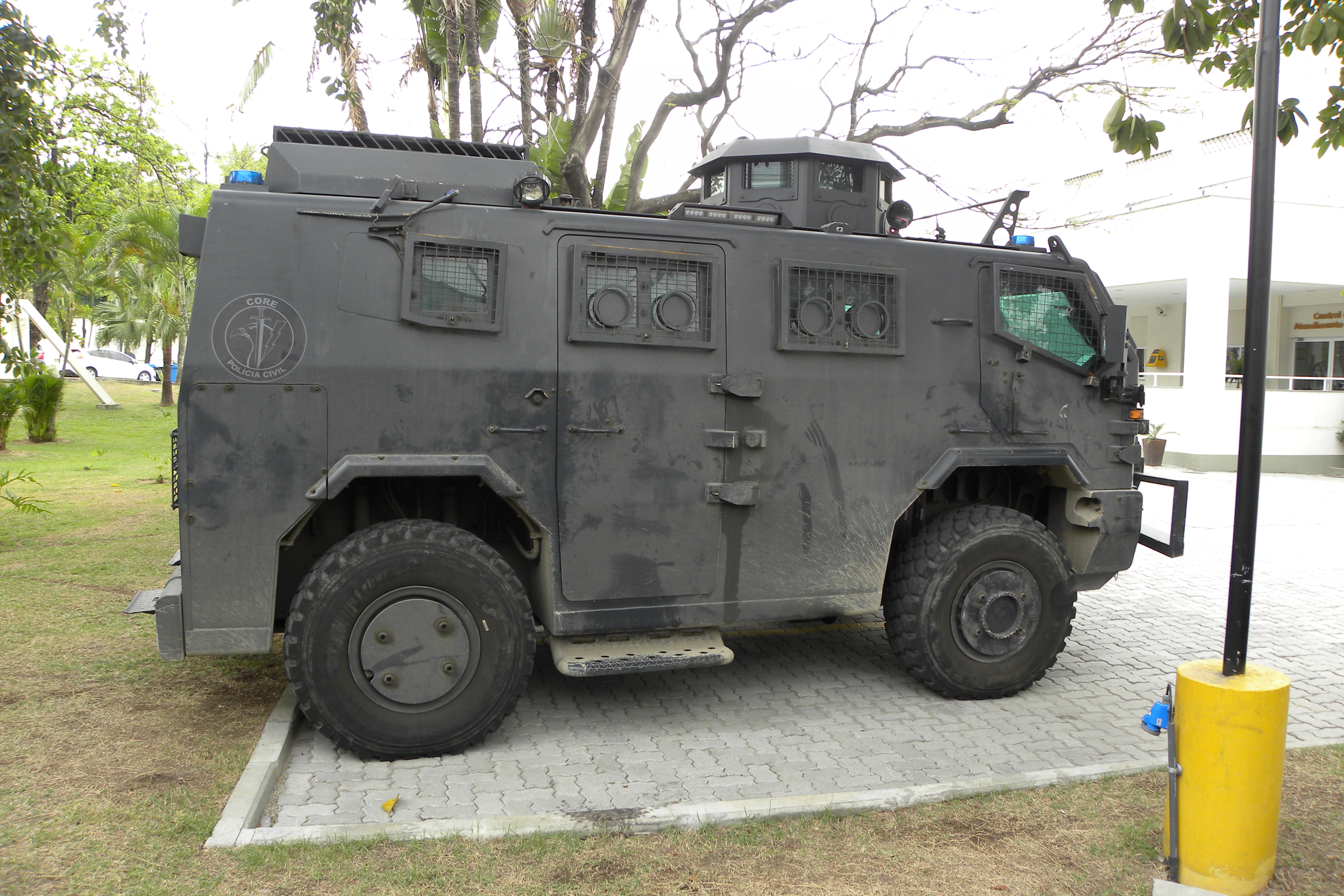
CORE Maverick armored vehicle

== Small arms ==
Model	Origin	Type	User	Reference
Taurus PT92	Brazil	Semi-automatic pistol	Standard issue	
Taurus PT 24/7	Brazil	Semi-automatic pistol	Standard issue	
Taurus PT940	Brazil	Semi-automatic pistol	Standard issue	
Taurus Millennium series	Brazil	Semi-automatic pistol	Standard issue	
Glock	Austria	Semi-automatic pistol	Coordenadoria de Recursos Especiais	
Taurus CT30	Brazil	Submachine gun	In use	
Heckler & Koch MP5	Germany	Submachine gun	Coordenadoria de Recursos Especiais	
AR-15	United States	Rifle	In use	
SIGM400	United States	Rifle	In use	
CAR-15	United States	Rifle	In use	
FN FAL	Belgium	Rifle	In use	
IMBEL MD	Brazil	Rifle	In use	
IMBEL IA2	Brazil	Rifle	In use	
IMBEL MD97	Brazil	Rifle	Coordenadoria de Recursos Especiais	
Heckler & Koch G3	West Germany	Rifle	Coordenadoria de Recursos Especiais	
Ruger Mini-14	United States	Rifle	Coordenadoria de Recursos Especiais	
M16A2	United States	Rifle	Coordenadoria de Recursos Especiais	
AK-47	Soviet Union	Rifle	Coordenadoria de Recursos Especiais	
Heckler & Koch PSG1	West Germany	Rifle	Coordenadoria de Recursos Especiais	
Armalite SuperSASS	United States	Rifle	Coordenadoria de Recursos Especiais	
Madsen machine gun	Denmark	Machine gun	In use	
Minimi Mk2	Belgium	Machine gun	Coordenadoria de Recursos Especiais	

== In popular culture ==
The Rio Civil Police appear in the 2011 film Fast Five, the fifth installment in the Fast & Furious series.

== See also ==
- Civil Police (Brazil)
- CORE (special operations)
- Civil Police Museum (Rio de Janeiro)
- Brazilian Federal Police
- Brazilian Intelligence Agency
- Civil Police of the Federal District
