= Maverick (armoured vehicle) =

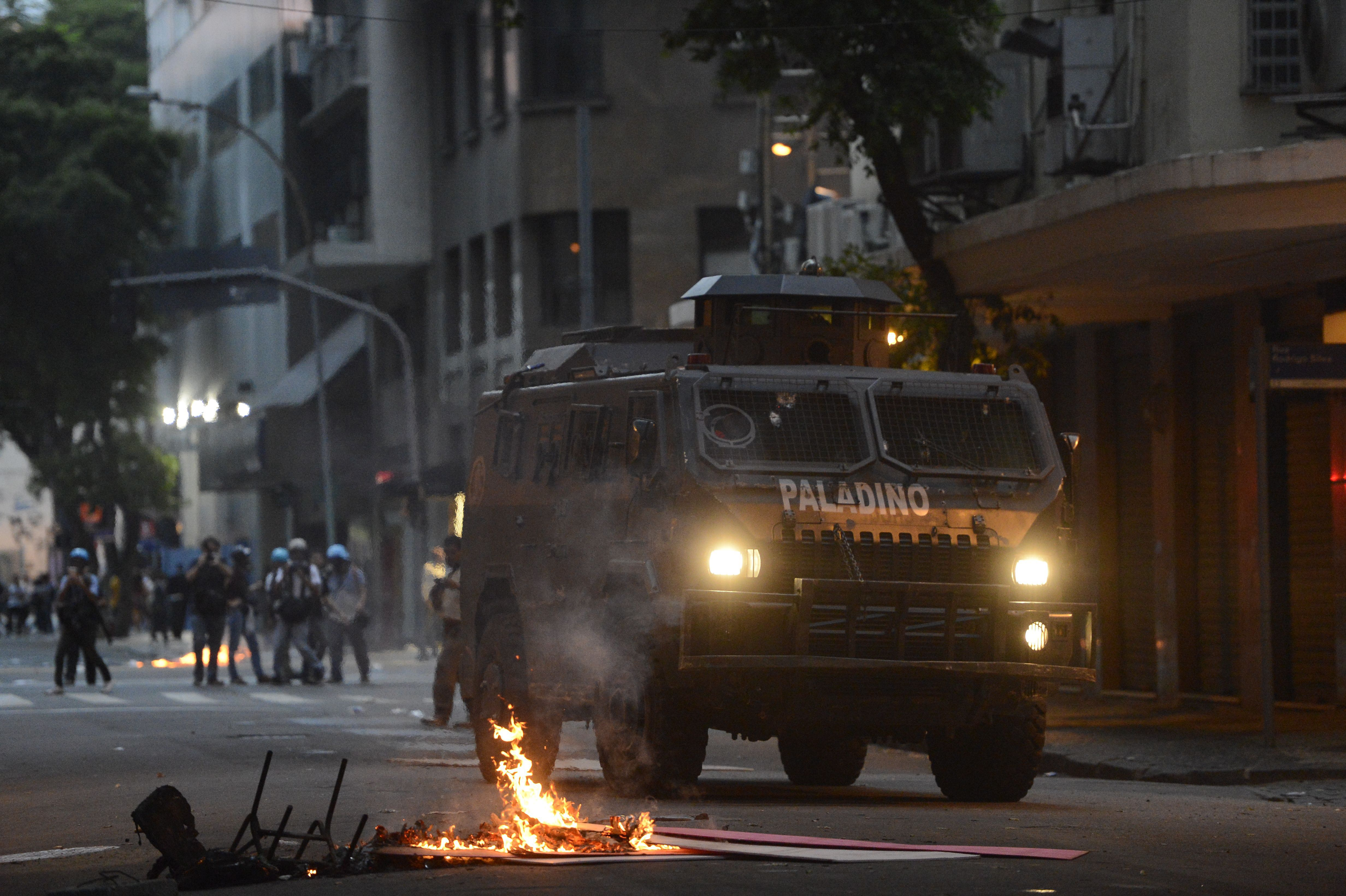
- Type: Internal security vehicle
- Place of origin: South Africa

Service history
- Used by: Internal Troops of Azerbaijan & Peacekeeping in Africa; Military Police of Rio de Janeiro State in Brazil

Production history
- Manufacturer: Paramount Group
- Produced: 2008–Present

Specifications
- Mass: 15,000 kg (combat); 10,000 kg (curb)
- Crew: 2 + 10 passengers
- Armor: Ballistic Protection: STANAG 4569 level III (7.62×54mmR B 32 API - Dragunov)
- Engine: diesel
- Payload capacity: 5,000 kg
- Maximum speed: 120km/h
- Steering system: 16.5 metres turning radius

The Maverick is an internal security vehicle that was designed and developed by the Paramount Group in South Africa.

It was launched in 2008 during the Africa Aerospace and Defence Exhibition (AAD), which took place at the Ysterplaat Air Force Base in Cape Town, South Africa.

== Vehicle specifics ==
The Maverick has a combat weight of 15,000 kg, a kerb weight of 10,000 kg and a payload weight of 5,000 kg. The vehicle has a turning radius of 16.5 metres, which makes it very agile and manoeuvrable and therefore suitable for operations in both urban and rural areas.

The Maverick is fitted with either a militarised MAN engine and a 12-Speed Semi-Automatic, or with a diesel power plant with a 6-speed fully automatic transmission. The advantage of both engines is that they are common all around the world, which means that the vehicles can be repaired and serviced in most countries.

The Maverick may be fitted with a biological and chemical protection filtration system, and has a cruising speed of between 100 and 120 kilometres per hour and a road range of approximately 700 kilometres.

== Armour ==
Like its sister vehicles, the Marauder and the Matador, the Maverick features a double-skin monocoque structure, giving it a neat, modern and smooth look.

The vehicle’s hull structure is designed in such way that the crew is protected from Dragunov projectiles, impact from .50 calibre kinetic energy projectiles and attacks from improvised explosive device, commonly known as IEDs.

== Armament ==
The Maverick’s large size and box-like shape provides sufficient space for the crew, their kits and various types of military equipment, such as anti riot gear, surveillance equipment, water cannons, ramps for SWAT Teams, and bomb disposal robots. The vehicle can be fitted with an external fire extinguishing system and small and medium calibre turrets can be mounted on its roof.

== User countries ==
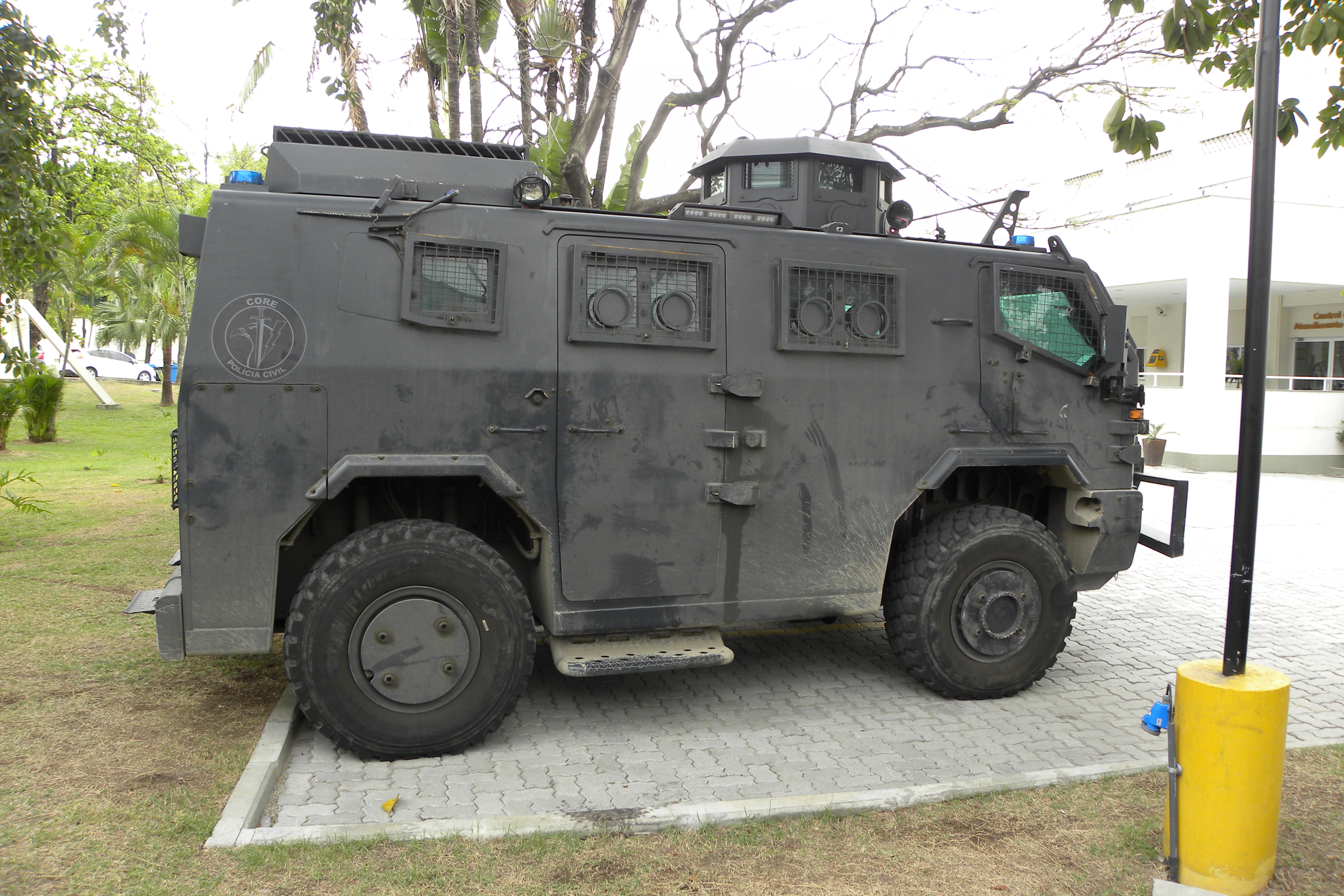
Civil Police of Rio de Janeiro State CORE Maverick

Argentina
Brigada Especial Operativa Halcón
Azerbaijan
Internal Troops of Azerbaijan
Brazil
Military Police of Rio de Janeiro State
Civil Police of Rio de Janeiro State
Gabon
Ghana
Ghana Army
South Africa
South African Police Service Special Task Force
Zambia
Zambia Police Service
