= Gran Teatro Falla =

Theatre in Cádiz, Spain

Coordinates: 36°32′01″N 6°18′09″W

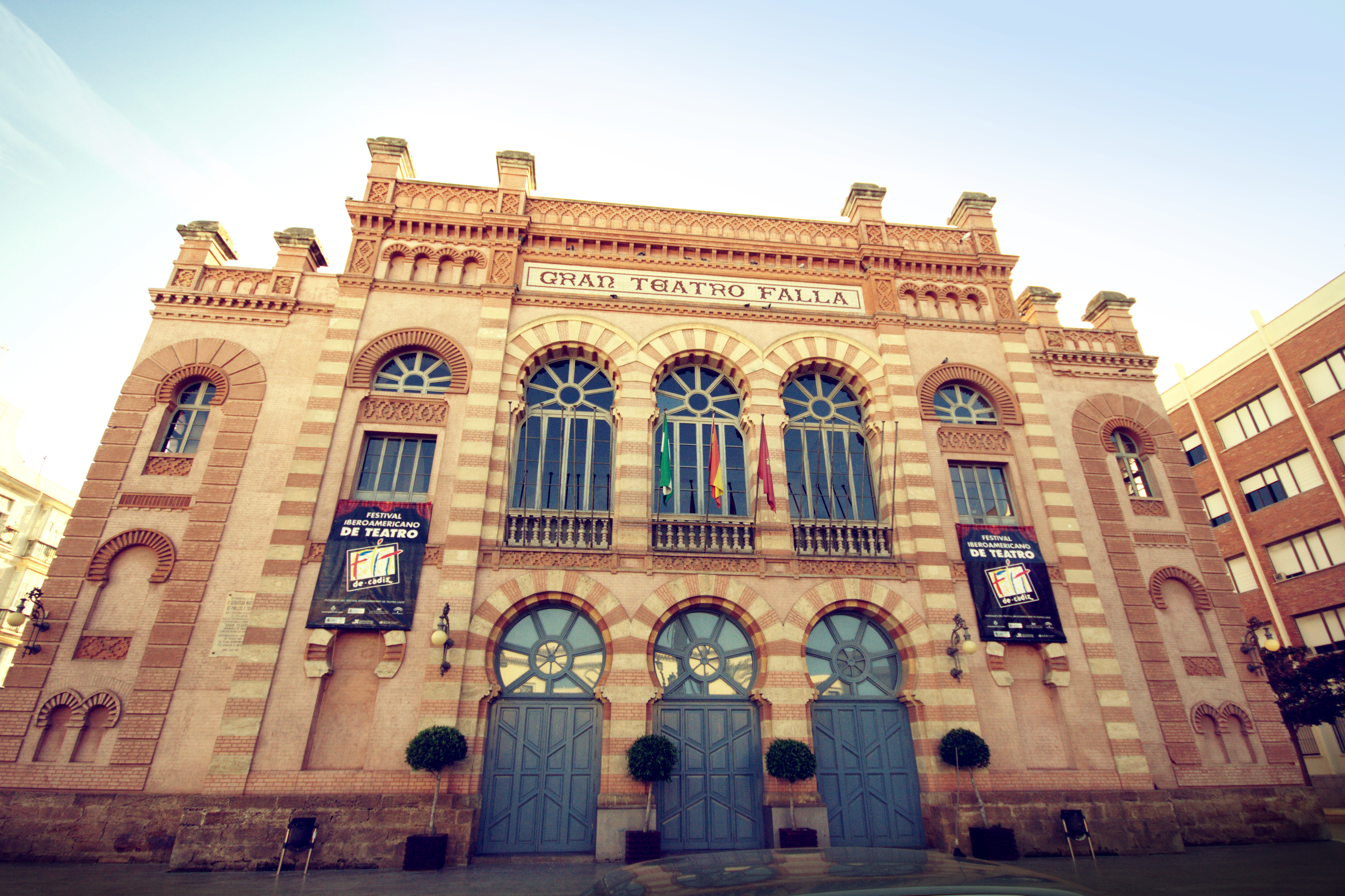
Gran Teatro Falla.

The Gran Teatro Falla is a theater in the city of Cádiz, Andalusia, Spain. It is located in the Plaza Fragela, facing the Casa de las Viudas and adjacent to the Faculty of Medicine of the University of Cádiz.

Construction of the theater began in 1884, following plans by architect Adolfo Morales de los Ríos. It was based on the foundation of the previous Gran Teatro de Cádiz, a wooden building designed by García del Álamo and built in 1871, but which had burned in 1881. In 1886 the city government took over direction of the project, which proceeded only intermittently due to lack of funds. The theater was completed in 1905. Municipal architect Juan Cabrera de la Torre made significant modifications to Morales's original plans. The theater was known as the "Gran Teatro" until 1926 when it was renamed for composer and native son Manuel de Falla.

Built in the Neo-Mudéjar style, it is made of red brick, and has three grand horseshoe arch entry doorways on its principal façade, with alternating red and white voussoirs. One enters through these doors into a large vestibule, which was redesigned in the 1920s. Stairways ascend to the horseshoe or U-shaped galleries above. The stage is 18 metres (59 ft) wide and 25.5 metres (84 ft) deep. The ceiling shows an allegory of Paradise, the work of Felipe Abarzuza y Rodríguez de Arias.

Every February the Gran Teatro Falla is the site of the artistic competitions of the Carnival of Cádiz. During repairs and restoration from 1987 to 1991, those competitions were held instead at the now-defunct Teatro Andalucía. Through the rest of the year, the theater hosts all manner of shows, such as plays or concerts.
