= Heitor de Mello =

Brazilian architect (1875–1920)

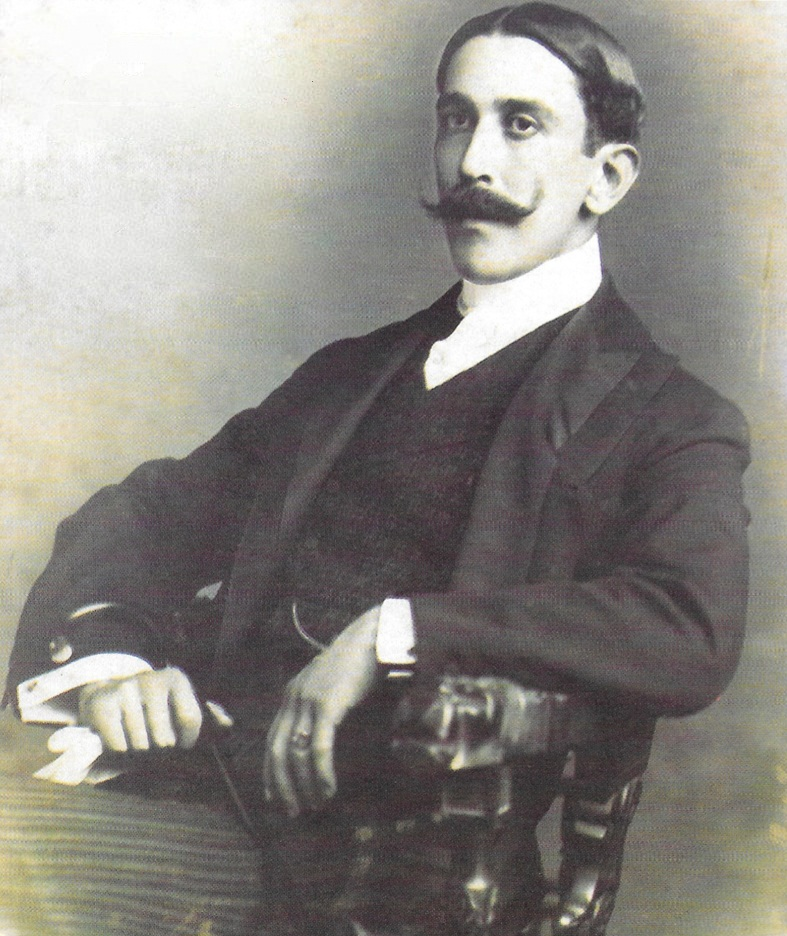
Heitor de Mello, c. 1900s–1910s

Heitor de Mello (12 September 1875 – 15 August 1920) was a Brazilian architect and professor. His principal works include the Pedro Ernesto Palace and the former building of the Jockey Club. In 1908, he won an international public competition to design the National Congress Palace, but the project never came to life.

== Biography ==
Born in Rio de Janeiro, he was the son of Custódio José de Melo, an admiral and government Minister. After a travel to Europe, he enrolled at the old National School of Fine Arts, from which he graduated in architecture and where he was strongly influenced by the standards of the École des Beaux-Arts. A student of the sculptor Rodolfo Bernardelli and of the Spanish architect Adolfo Morales de los Ríos, he trained in a ''classicizing'' style inspired by the French Renaissance.

In 1898, Mello founded his architectural firm, the Escriptório Técnico Heitor de Mello, one of the earliest in Brazil. It soon became one of the most active in the capital, attracting commissions from wealthy clients; he designed warehouses, police stations, mansions, bungalows, as well as schools, mainly in the eclectic style. Among those who worked there were Francisque Couchet, Lúcio Costa, and Archimedes Memória, who became one of Mello's apprentices and who took over his office after his death. In 1913, he began teaching at his alma mater and later reached the post of full professor. He taught architectural composition and drawing.

== Gallery ==
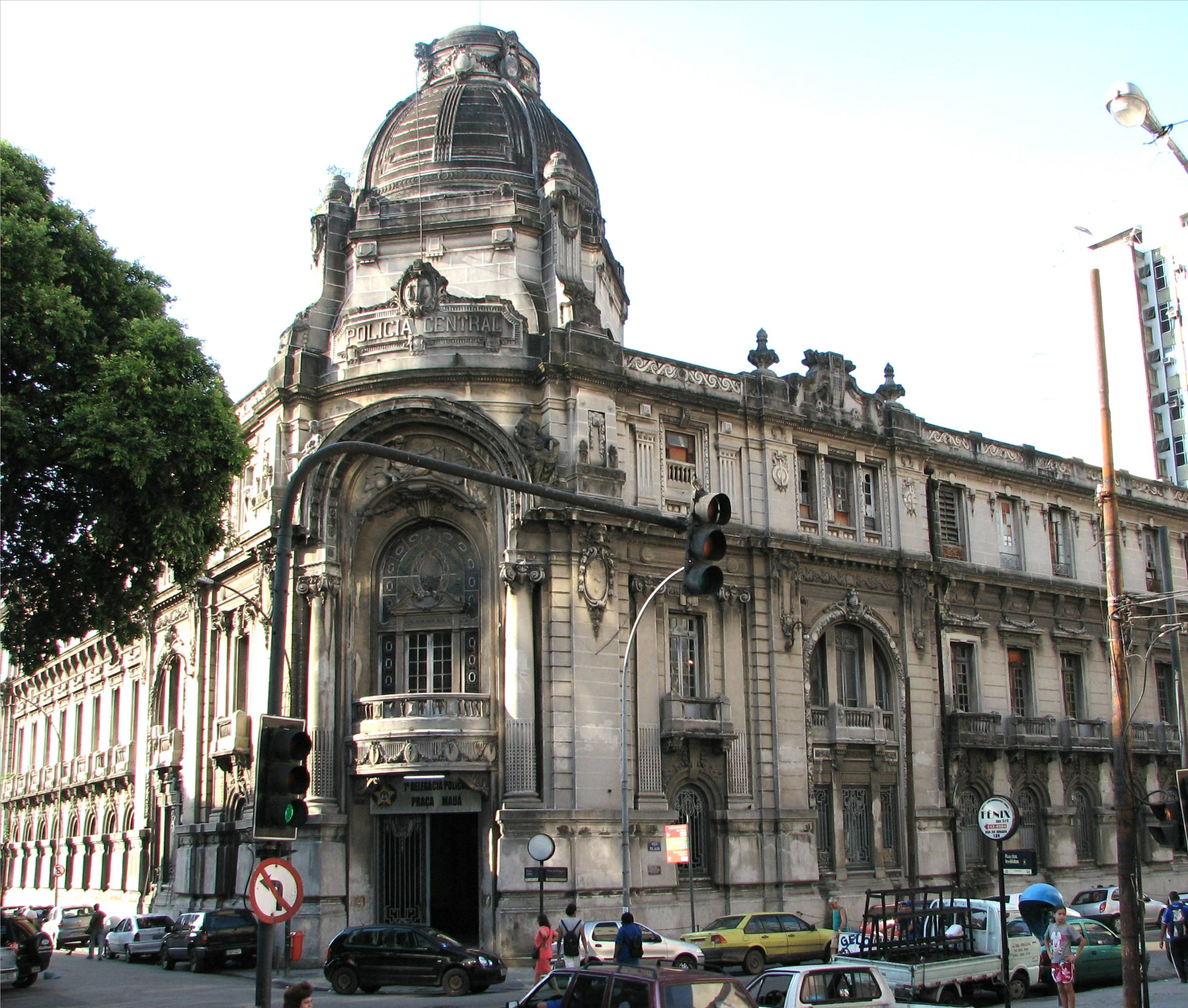
The old station of the Central Police

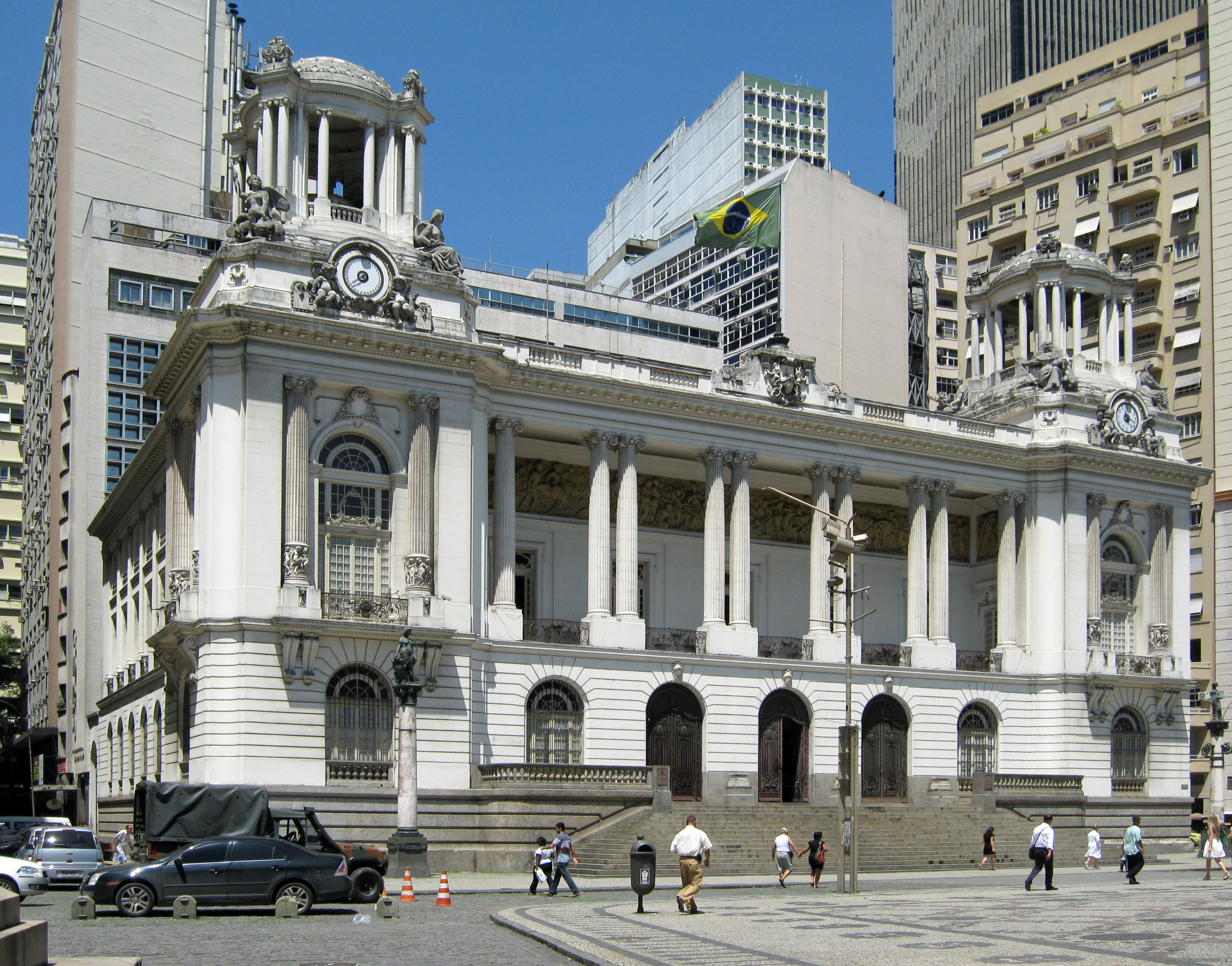
The Pedro Ernesto Palace, in Cinelândia

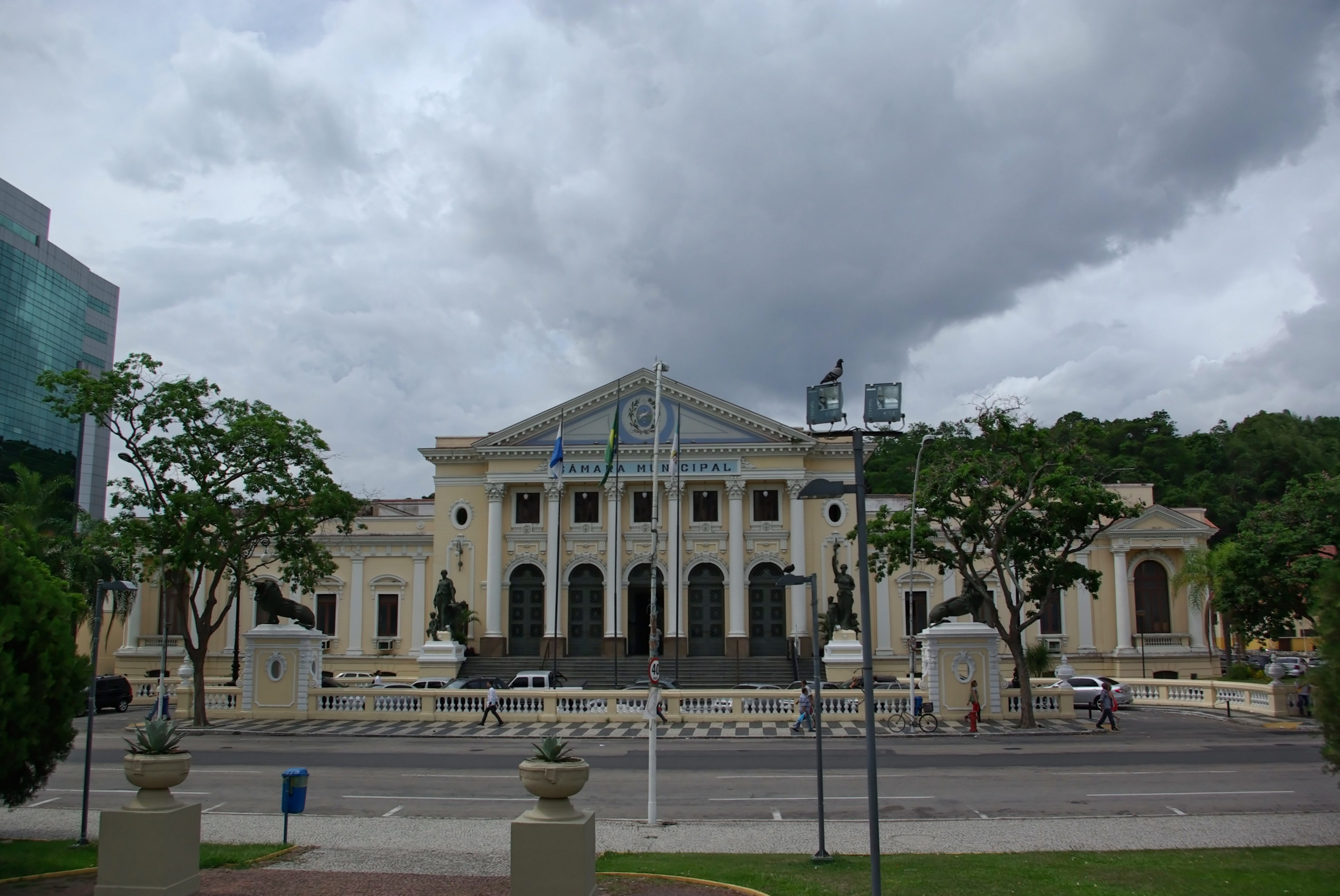
Niterói's city council

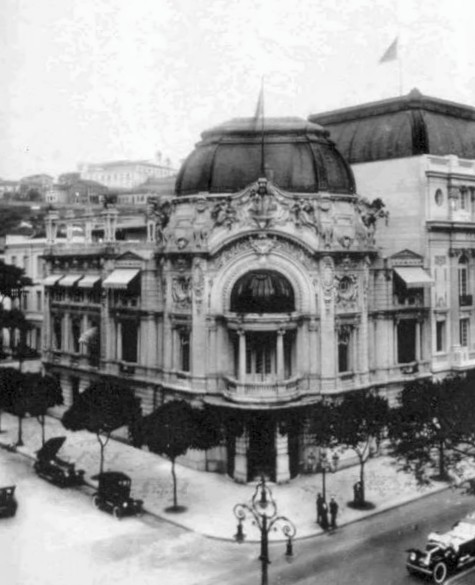
The now-demolished headquarters of the Jockey Club, in the city's downtown area

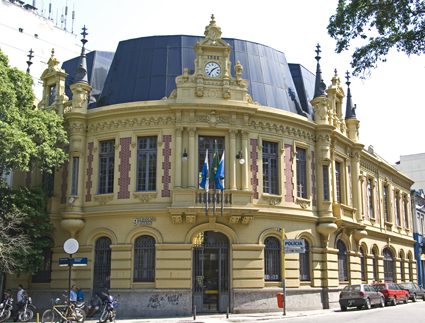
Building of the 9th Police Station, in Catete
