= Independence Centenary International Exposition =

World's fair held in Rio de Janeiro in 1922

1922 Rio de Janeiro
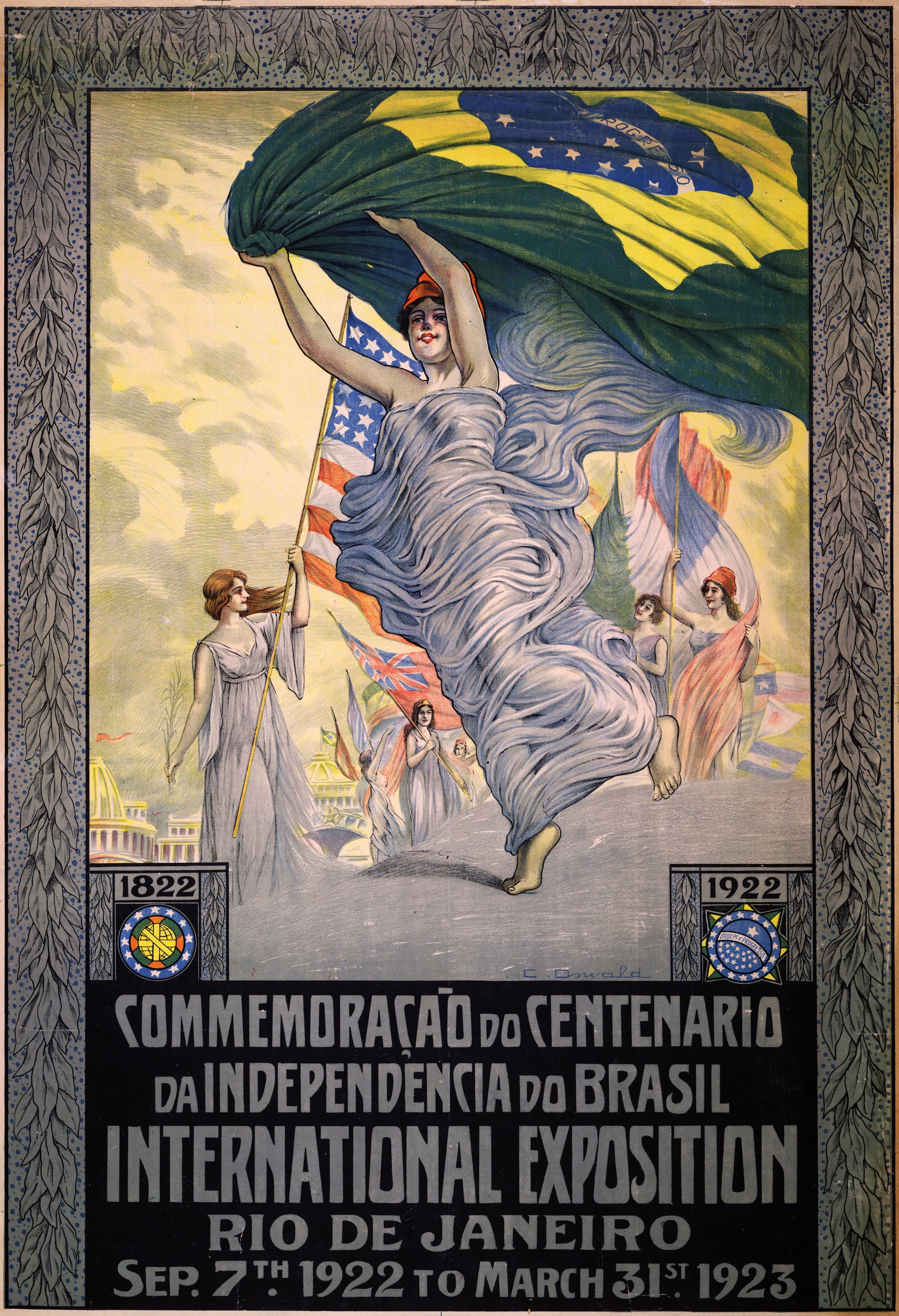
- Poster celebrating the 100th anniversary of the Independence of Brazil

Overview
- BIE-class: Universal exposition
- Name: Independence Centenary International Exposition
- Visitors: 3,000,000

Participant(s)
- Countries: 14

Location
- Country: Brazil
- City: Rio de Janeiro
- Venue: Avenida Rio Branco
- Coordinates: 22°54′17″S 43°10′39″W

Timeline
- Opening: September 7, 1922
- Closure: March 23, 1923

Universal expositions
- Previous: Panama–Pacific International Exposition in San Francisco
- Next: Ibero-American Exposition of 1929 in Sevilla and 1929 Barcelona International Exposition in Barcelona

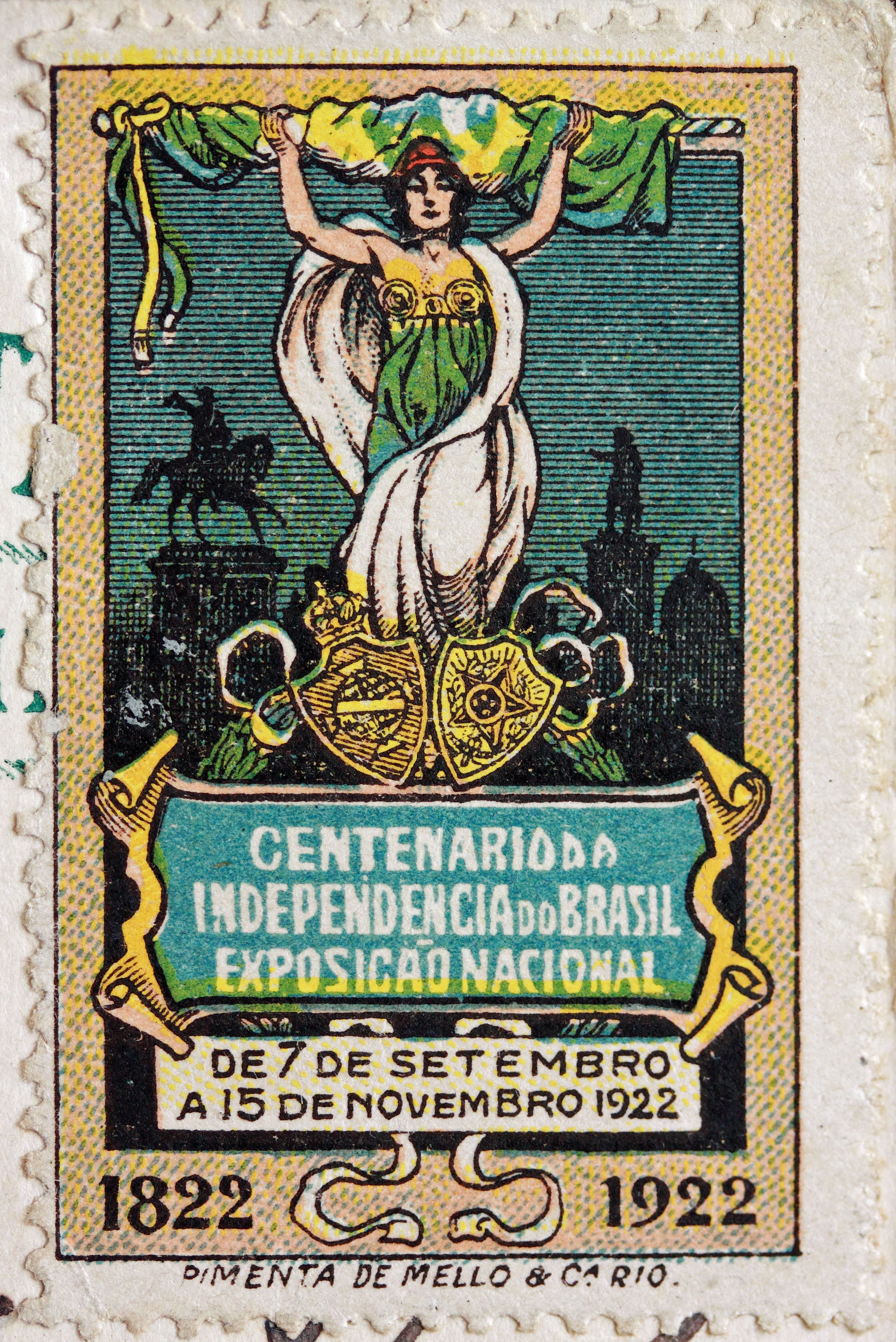
Commemorative Brazilian stamp

The Independence Centenary International Exposition (Portuguese: Exposição Internacional do Centenário da Independência) was a World Expo held in Rio de Janeiro from September 7, 1922 to March 23, 1923, to celebrate the 100th anniversary of Brazil's Independence. The expo happened during the Epitácio Pessoa Administration and was regarded as an opportunity to show off Brazil's growing industries and commercial opportunities. The Expo's pavilions were constructed alongside the Rio Branco Avenue and built just for the occasion.

A total of 14 countries from 3 continents took part in this edition of the Expo.

Over 3,000,000 people attended the event.

== Pavilions ==
=== National ===
Argentina, Brazil, Belgium, Czechoslovakia, Denmark, France, Great Britain, Italy, Japan, Mexico, Norway, Portugal, Sweden and United States.

=== Exposition Pavilions ===
- Administration Pavilion;
- Food Pavilion;
- Statistics Pavilion;
- Festivity Pavilion;
- Agriculture and Roads Pavilion;
- Small Industries Pavilion;
- Large Industries Pavilion;
- Hunting and Fishing Pavilion;
- Antarctica Brewery Pavilion;
- Jewelry Pavilion;
- Portugal's Honor Pavilion;
- Swedish Pavilion.

=== States Pavilions ===
The Brazilian States Pavilion was the biggest pavilion in the fair with 6,013 exhibitors from all the Brazilian states.
