= Coordenadoria de Recursos Especiais =

Brazilian police tactical unit

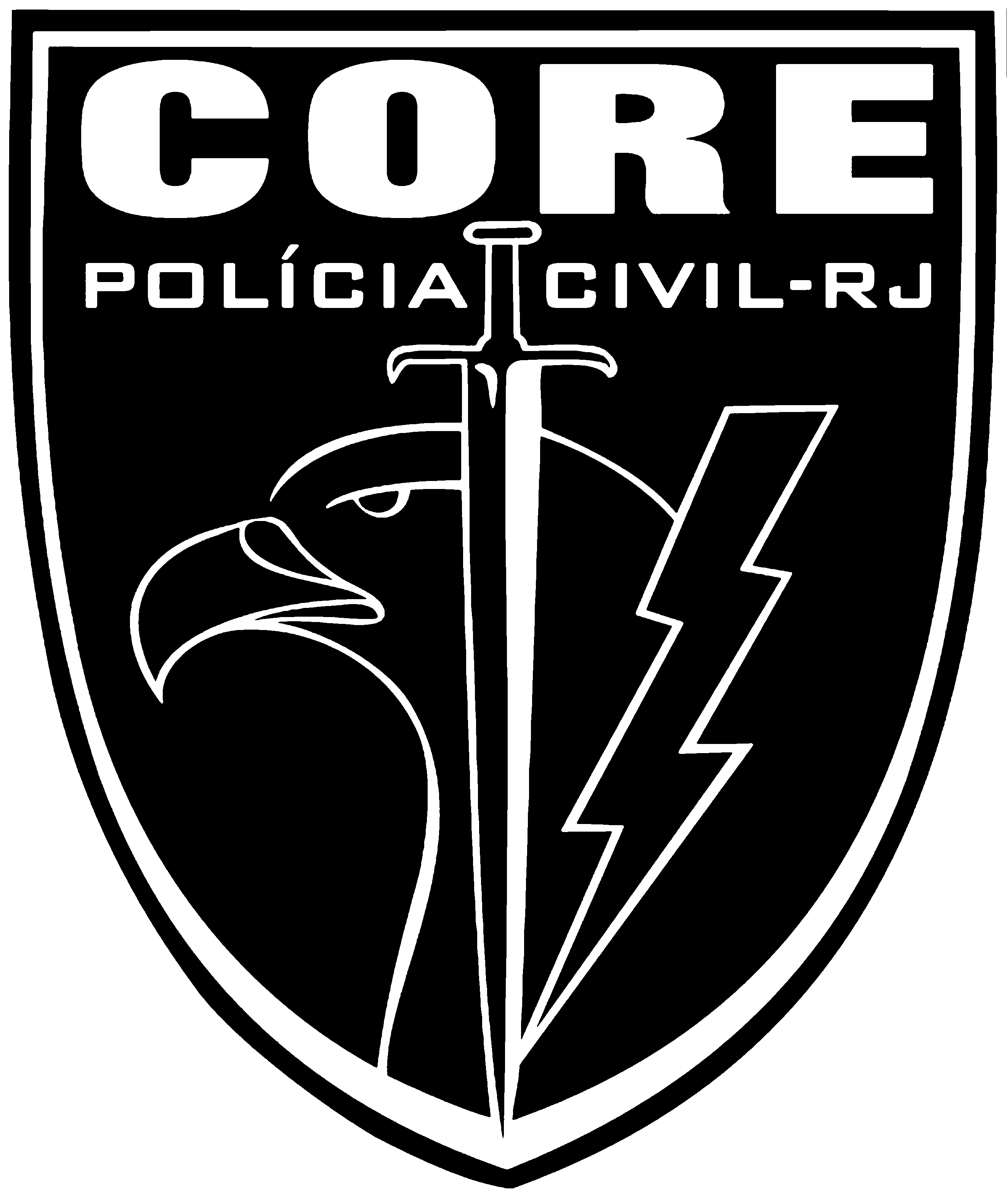
- Active: 1969–present
- Country: Brazil
- Type: Police tactical unit
- Garrison/HQ: Rio de Janeiro, Brazil
- Nickname: CORE
- Colors: Black
- Mascots: M16 crossed and knife in the skull
- Anniversaries: 4 July 1969

The Coordenadoria de Recursos Especiais (Portuguese for Coordination of Special Assets), best known by its acronym CORE, is a police tactical unit of the Civil Police of Rio de Janeiro State, that specialized in quick response to emergencies with SWAT unit tactics.

== History ==
It was formed on 4 July 1969 and is comparable to São Paulo's GOE.

== Duties ==
- Apprehension of armed and dangerous criminals.
- Counterterrorism and hostage rescue crisis management.
- High-risk tactical law enforcement.
- High-risk VIP's escort.
- Operating in difficult to access terrain.
- Operations against organized crimes.
- Providing security in areas at risk of attack or terrorism.
- Responding to emergency crises with SWAT unit tactics.
- Search and arrest dangerous criminals according to arrest warrants.
- Support crowd control and riot control.

== Services ==
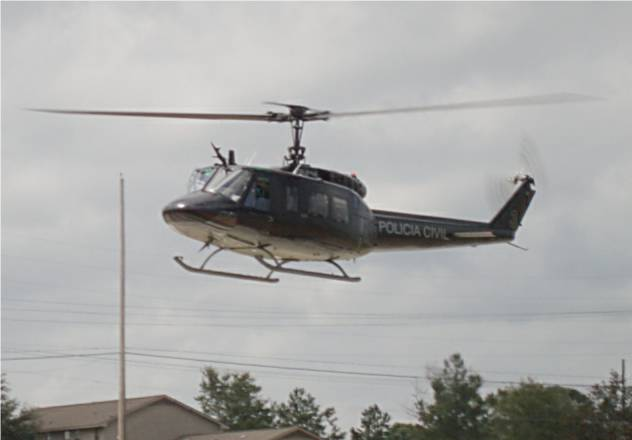
CORE helicopter – Bell Huey II

Its structure is composed of the following operating units:

- Serviço de Operações e Táticas Especiais (SOTE) - Special Operations and Tactics Service
  - Seção de Snipers; - Sniper Section
  - Seção de Operações Táticas (SOT) - Tactical Operations Section
  - Grupo de Operações Especiais (GOE) - Special Operations Group
  - Seção de Operações Aéreas (SOA) - Air Operations Section
  - Seção de Operações Marítimas e Ribeirinhas (SOMAR) - Maritime and Riverine Operations Section
  - Seção de Gerenciamento de Crises (SGC) - Crisis Management Section
  - Seção de Treinamento Especializado (STE) - Specialized Training Section
  - Seção de Logística e Equipamentos (SLE) - Logistic and Equipment Section
- Serviço de Apoio Policial (SAP) - Police Support Service
- Serviço de Planejamento Operacional (SPO) - Operational Planning Service
- Serviço Aeropolicial (SAER) - Air Police Service
- Esquadrão Anti-bomba (EAB) - Bomb Squad
- Serviço de Suporte Operacional (SESOP) - Operational Support Service

== Weapons ==
| Model | Type | Origin | References |
|---|---|---|---|
| Glock | Semi-automatic pistol | Austria | |
| Heckler & Koch MP5 | Submachine gun | Germany | |
| Colt M4 MONOLITHIC CQB | Assault rifle | United States | |
| Colt M16A2 | Assault rifle | United States | |
| ArmaLite AR-10 | Assault rifle | United States | |
| Armalite SuperSASS | Assault rifle | United States | |
| FN FAL | Battle rifle | Belgium | |
| Minimi MK2 | Machine gun | Belgium | |

== Armoured Vehicles ==
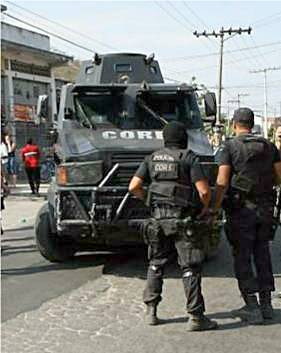
Caveirão Armored Vehicle

CORE has armoured vehicles, popularly known caveirões, used mainly in operations where conflict with drug traffickers is likely. The main purpose of these armoured vehicles is to protect trim elements and destroy barriers used by drug traffickers. Armoured vehicles are still essential in supporting the rescue of trapped police units and in removing the wounded from confrontations.

== Bibliography ==
- MAULAZ, Paulo - Operações Especiais, Rio de Janeiro, PCERJ, 2006. (Port)

== Gallery ==
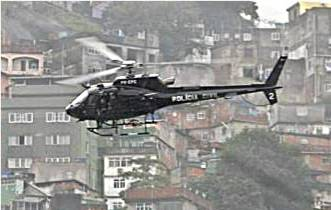
CORE Esquilo helicopter

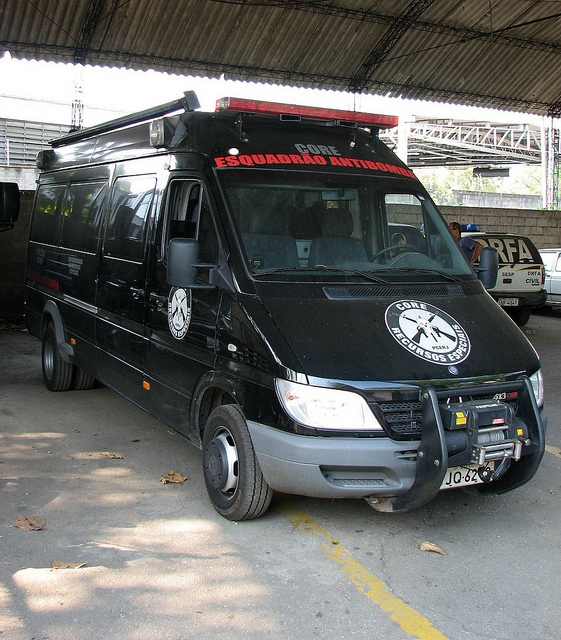
CORE Bomb Squad car

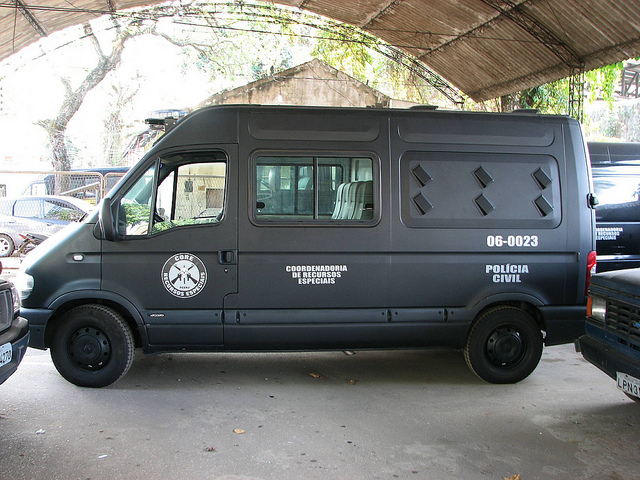
Bomb-dog unit car

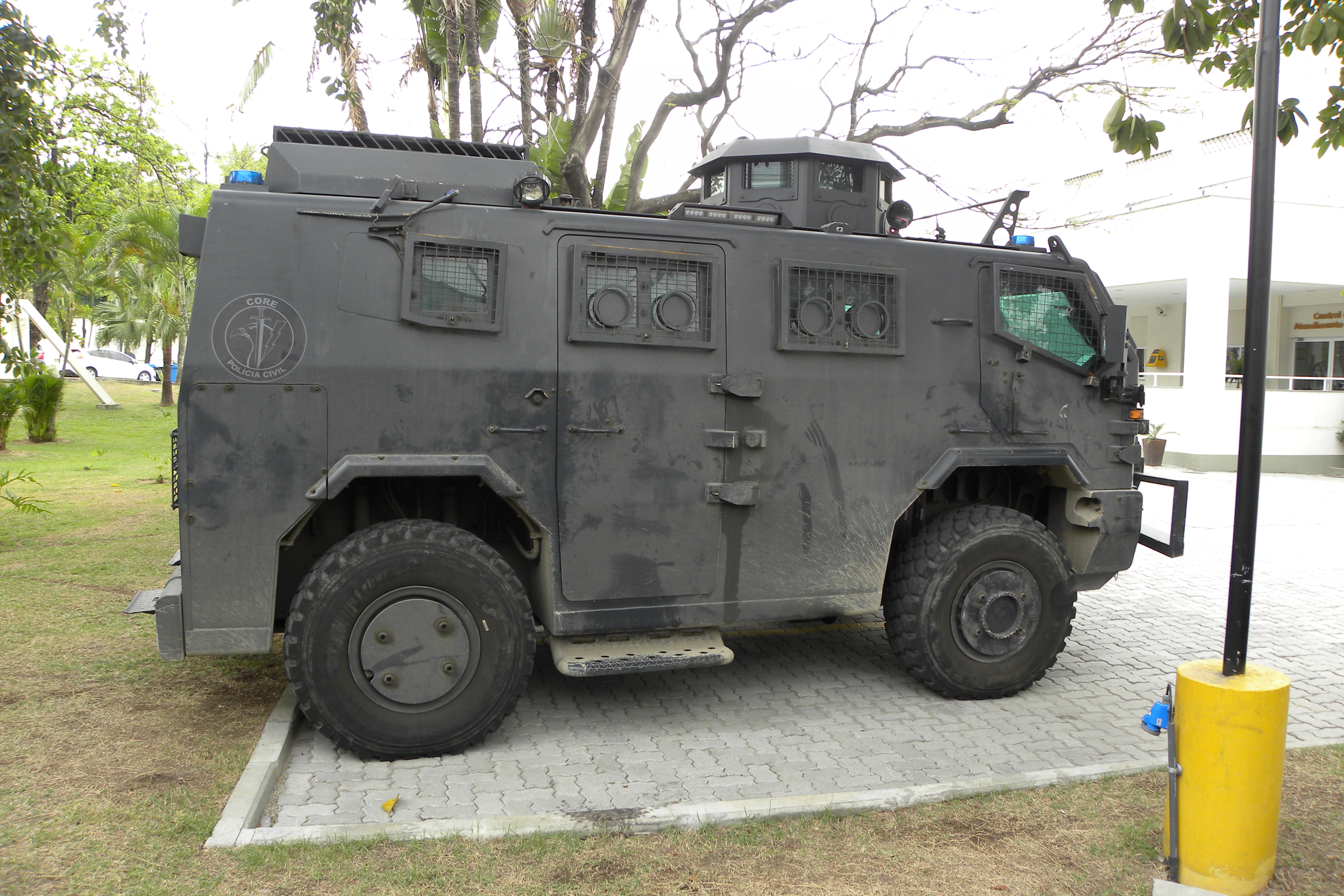
CORE Maverick APC

== See also ==
- Civil Police (Brazil)
- Civil Police of Rio de Janeiro State
- GOE (Brazil)
- GATE (Brazil)
- List of police tactical units
