= Special Operations Group (Brazil) =

Grupo de Operações Especiais
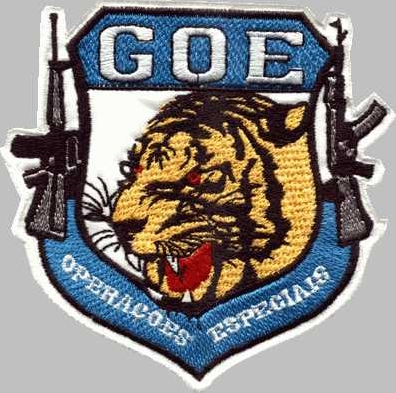
- GOE
- Active: 1991–2019
- Country: Brazil
- Type: Police tactical unit
- Garrison/HQ: São Paulo, Brazil
- Nickname: GOE
- Colors: Black
- Mascot: The Tiger

The Grupo de Operações Especiais (English: Special Operations Group), commonly known as GOE, was the police tactical unit of the Brazilian Civil Police of the state of São Paulo, Brazil, comparable to Rio de Janeiro's CORE.

== History ==
Founded in 1991, the GOE served to assist conventional police units in high risk operations involving dangerous criminals, hostages, terrorists, and uprisings in the prison system. It was subordinate to the Departamento de Polícia Judiciária da Capital ("Judicial Capital Police Department") – DECAP.

In 2005 they moved to new headquarters in Campo Belo in the southern zone of São Paulo which contains infrastructure appropriate to their role as a police tactical unit.

They recently distinguished themselves by imprisoning Lebanese Citizen Rana Abdel-Rahim Koleilat, who was a fugitive in Brazil. She was involved in schemes that led to defrauding investors of funds.

In 2019, the Governor of the State of São Paulo, João Dória, extinguished the group and its members were moved to the newly created Department of Strategic Police Operations (Departamento de Operações Policiais Estratégicas).

== Structure ==
The São Paulo GOE has about 200 members, a fleet of 60 vehicles, 5 tactical subdivisions, as well as a specialized Delta unit with its own intelligence service and plain-clothes police and unmarked cars, as well as administrative divisions.

The group has an operational base located in the Campo Belo neighborhood, south side, where there is the necessary infrastructure for civilian police can carry out their missions and training.

The base has a fitness and martial training arts center, climbing wall and abseiling use of local training for CQB/CQC, instruction rooms, meeting rooms, accommodation, dressing rooms, workshop for maintenance weaponry, and parking.

There, the police conduct fitness and self defense training with an emphasis on martial arts like Aikido and Jiu Jitsu. Also perform combat training with knives and retractable baton, vehicle approach, use of non- lethal weapons and other aiming to improve the training of police members of the group.

However, the training of fire are usually conducted on the campus of Mogi das Cruzes Police Academy.

== Training ==
Exchanges and courses are often conducted in diverse and renowned national institutions like: CORE/PCERJ, Paratrooper Brigade of the Army, Army Technological Center, and even foreign, such as the American's FBI SWAT Teams, the Colombian's GOES, the Germany's GSG 9, the Portuguese's GOE, the Spanish's GEO, etc.

The officers of the GOE are enabled in personnel including action and combat CBRN emergencies, anti-irregular military, apprehension of armed and dangerous criminals, combat and patrolling in urban areas, combat defense in confined environments, counterterrorism and hostage rescue crisis management, defusing and disposal of bombs, fast tactical shooting commitment, patrolling and displacement in areas of high risk, providing security in areas at risk of attack or terrorism, support crowd control and riot control, tactical driving, and other activities of special operations.

Many have worked in other tactical units and some even have served for years the Brazilian Armed Forces.

== Roles ==
The GOE was a unit of special features and has the basic assignment assist law enforcement authorities and their agents in judicial police missions.

This assistance usually occurs when these authorities and agents have to develop activities that, by their complexity, beyond their training or does not have adequate resources to carry materials. It is for the GOE, in the district of DECAP, the activities of specialized preventive policing.

Some basic tasks of the GOE were:

- Apprehension of armed and dangerous criminals;
- Crisis management such as control of civil unrest, hostage rescue, inmates riot, providing security in areas at risk of attack or terrorism, urban terrorism, etc.;
- Engage irregular military;
- Escort and/or removal of extremely dangerous prisoners;
- Guard public and/ or private interest of the civilian police facilities;
- High-risk tactical law enforcement situations;
- Incursions in areas of risk, in support of other units or the civilian police in the performance of specialized preventive policing activities;
- Search and seizure;
- VIPs protection;

== See also ==
- Civil Police (Brazil)
- CORE (Brazil)
- Batalhão de Operações Policiais Especiais (Brazil)
- GATE (Brazil)
- List of police tactical units
