= List of massacres in Brazil =

The following is a list of massacres that have occurred in Brazil (numbers may be approximate):

== Colonial & Imperial Brazil (1500–1889) ==
Name	Date	Location	Deaths	Notes
Serra dos Órgãos massacre	1699	Serra dos Órgãos, now Serra dos Órgãos National Park, Rio de Janeiro	unknown	The governor, Artur de Sá e Meneses, organized "Disciplined Corps," and through a military expedition carried out a massacre in the Quilombo da Serra dos Órgãos region.
Rodeador Massacre	1820 October 25	Bonito, Pernambuco	91	Governor Luiz do Rego sends troops to destroy a Sebastianist community, believing it to be a separatist movement. 100+ wounded; 200 women and 300 children are imprisoned and taken to Recife.
Diligente Brig Massacre	1823 October 20–22	Belém, Pará	255	256 mutinous soldiers are locked in the hold of the brig Diligente. The heat and lack of air cause the prisoners to panic. After multiple demands, the guards give them a small amount of water, leading to a brawl among the prisoners. Fearing they might escape, guards fire their weapons into the hold and throw quicklime down the hatches before locking them. All but one prisoner dies.
Pedra Bonita massacre	1838 May 14–17	Pernambuco	54	12 men, 12 women, and 30 children are sacrificed by a Sebastianist cult. 14 dogs are also killed. The cult's leader is eventually murdered by his brother who takes over the cult. The cult was dismantled following a police raid where 5 soldiers and 16 cult members (Including 3 women) are killed.
Porongos Massacre	1844 November 14	Porongos stream (present-day Pinheiro Machado, Rio Grande do Sul)	100	Around 100 black lancers, who were fighting for freedom, They were ambushed and killed by imperial troops at Serro dos Porongos.

== First to Fourth Brazilian Republic (1889-1964) ==
Name	Date	Location	Deaths	Notes
November 17 Massacre	1889 November 17	São Luís, Maranhão	4	Republican troops opened fire on the crowd of formerly enslaved people. who were protesting against the newly proclaimed Republic, fearing the return of slavery resulting in four deaths and dozens of injuries.
Anhatomirim Island Massacre	1894 July	Anhatomirim Island, Santa Catarina	185	Firing squads and summary executions of Prisoners of the Federalist Revolution, many of them from Santa Catarina by order of Colonel Moreira César
Alto Alegre massacre	1901 March 13	Barra do Corda, Maranhão	200	A Rebellion by Guajajara Indians, in the municipality of Barra do Corda, results in approximately 200 deaths.
Alcobaça Shooting	1902 July	Alcobaça, Pará	10	Forty Indigenous people invade the city of Alcobaça, loot the guns of Manoel João, and attack inhabitants of the city. Raymundo Memado shoots and kills ten of the Indigenous people, causing their group to disband.
Iguaçu Massacre	1914 November	Iguaçu Valley	17	During the Contestado war, 17 traders suspected of aiding the rebels are executed by pro-government irregulars.
Garanhuns Hecatomb	1917 January 15	Garanhuns, Pernambuco	18	Following the assassination of Mayor Julio Brasileiro, his nephew Alfredo Viana storms the city with 100 men to avenge his death. With help from a judge and the police chief, 18 of the former mayor's enemies are lured into the local jail and shot to death.
Bombing of São Paulo	1924 July 5 - 28	São Paulo	503 - 1,000	during the São Paulo Revolt of 1924, rebel and loyalist forces used bombing in their fight for the city; the rebels had up to 26 artillery pieces from the Brazilian Army, while the loyalists had more than a hundred guns and six bombers from the Army Aviation. Artillery, and especially loyalist artillery, was largely responsible for the conflict's casualties, most of whom were civilians.
Alto do Leitão Massacre	1928 January 5	Barbalha, Ceará	5	Massacre of prisoners linked to the cangaço movement
Battle of Praça da Sé	1934 October 7	São Paulo	7	Conflict between anti-fascists and integralists in the center of the city of São Paulo, 30 wounded.
Brazilian communist uprising of 1935	1935 November 23–27	Natal, Rio Grande do Norte, Recife, Pernambuco, and Rio de Janeiro.	150	
Caldeirão massacre	1937 May 11	Crato, Ceará	400-700	Minister of war Eurico Gaspar Dutra orders the destruction of the religious community known as Caldeirão da Santa Cruz do Deserto. 200 policemen are sent to attack the community, and the area is bombed by three military airplanes.
Pau de Colher massacre	1938 January 19–21	Pernambuco-Piauí border	1000	The Pernambuco police attack the religious community of Pau de Colher, which includes survivors from the Caldeirão massacre. It is estimated that a total of 1000 inhabitants were killed, including those who were shot by police and those who later died of starvation and thirst.
Chinese restaurant massacre	1938 March 1	São Paulo city, São Paulo	4	Murder and torture of four people in a small Chinese restaurant.
Integralist Uprising	1938 May 11	Rio de Janeiro	22	Failed coup by the Brazilian Integralist Action (AIB) against the government of President Getúlio Vargas during the Estado Novo.
Ataléia Barracks Massacre	1948 10 July	Ataléia, Minas Geraiss	4	A group of soldiers storm the local barracks to release Private Alvino Nicolau Alves, who had been arrested for attacking his commanding officer while drunk. 4 guards are killed in the attack.
Pacheco Fernandes Massacre	1959 February 8	Brasília, Federal District	100+	Mass murder of an unknown number of workers by the Brasília Special Guard.
Niterói circus fire	1961 December 17	Niterói, Rio de Janeiro	503	800+ wounded, Three people were arrested and convicted of starting the fire.
Ipatinga massacre	1963 October 7	Minas Gerais	8 (Officially)	79 wounded
Massacre at 11th Parallel	1963 November	Mato Grosso	30	Rubber workers massacre a village of the Cinta Larga people, leaving only 2 alive.
Mari massacre	1964 January 15	Mari, Paraíba	11	Clash between peasants, plant employees, and police in Mari, Paraíba, leaving 11 dead and 4 injured.

== Military dictatorship (1964-1985) ==
Name	Date	Location	Deaths	Notes
Matapiruma massacre	1972 October 5	Escada, Pernambuco	2	Police officers from the Department of Political and Social Order, of Pernambuco, (DOPS/PE) open fire on residents who work cutting sugarcane, resulting in two deaths and several injuries.
Oficina de Reabilitação do Instituto Nacional de Previdência Social massacre	1977 December 20	Curitiba, Paraná	2	
Princesa Isabel massacre	1979 June 29	Princesa Isabel, Paraíba	7	
Barra do Garças air disaster	1980 June 1	Barra do Garças, Mato Grosso	8 (including the perpetrator)	4 wounded; case of suicide by pilot.
Baldo tragedy	1984 February 25	Natal, Rio Grande do Norte	19	12 wounded; Perpetrator caught 42 years later.

== Post-dictatorship Brazil ==
Name	Date	Location	Deaths	Notes
Princesa Farm massacre	1985 September 11	Marabá, Pará	5	Murder and torture of five rural workers who occupied an area of the farm owned by Marlon Pidde in Marabá, southeastern Pará.
Pena Verde massacre	1986 December 31	Ribas do Rio Pardo, Mato Grosso do Sul	6	Serial killer Osvaldo de Paula Silva, nicknamed Buickinho, kills six people, five of them teenagers, on a farm in Ribas do Rio Pardo.
Carandiru riot 1987	1987 July 29	São Paulo	31	
Helmet massacre	1988 March 28	Amazonas	4	19 wounded, government workers massacre unarmed Ticuna people.
1988 CSN strike	1988 November 9	Volta Redonda Rio de Janeiro	3	100+ wounded. Three workers die in an attempt by the police and the army to retake control of the steel company facilities. Two of the workers are shot and taken by their colleagues to a hospital. One was found with heavy bruises on the head.
1989 Santa Elmira massacre	1989 March 11	Rio Grande do Sul	19	400 injured, MST workers attempted to occupy an area in Salto do Jacuí, but are shot at by UDR rural owners.
Attack on post of the Brazilian Army on the Traíra River	1991 February 26	Taraíra River, Amazonas	3	FARC guerrillas assault the Solimoes river control post in the remote region of the Traira River, near the border with Colombia. The attack leaves three Brazilian soldiers dead and nine wounded. In response, the Brazilian army launches Operation Traira.
Carandiru massacre	1992 October 2	São Paulo	111	The massacre is triggered by a prisoner revolt within the prison. The police make little if any effort to negotiate with the prisoners before the military police storm the building, as the prison riot becomes more difficult for prison guards to control. The resulting casualties are 111 prisoners killed and 37 more injured.
Haximu massacre	1993 June – July	Haximu, Brazil	16-73	Garimpeiros (illegal gold miners) kill Yanomami people.
Candelária massacre	1993 July 23	Rio de Janeiro	8	Police massacre 8 homeless people.
Vigário Geral massacre	1993 August 29	Rio de Janeiro	21	Rio military police attack random people in retribution for being attacked by gangs.
PAAR killings	1995 May 29	Ananindeua, Pará	7 (including the perpetrators)	A group of 5 criminals led by Paulo Mapará, invade the Conjunto PAAR police station, in Ananindeua, and kill 2 police officers, 2 investigators, and 1 delegate.
Slaughter of Corumbiara	1995 August 9	Corumbiara Rondônia	12 (Officially)	Conflict between police officers and landless peasants results in the death of 12 people, including a nine-year-old child and two police officers, with 64 injured
Eldorado dos Carajás massacre	1996 April 17	Pará	19	Protesters of the Landless Workers' Movement, attempting to occupy a large private ranch, were shot by military police.
Invasion of the Cikel farm	1996 June 11	Buriticupu, Maranhão	4	
São Paulo State Sanitation Company Shooting	1996 December 18	São Paulo	4 (including the perpetrator)	Marcelo Kenji Yoshino killed three people and wounded two others in São Paulo, before committing suicide.
Santo Antônio do Potengi massacre	1997 May 21–22	Santo Antônio do Potengi, São Gonçalo do Amarante, Rio Grande do Norte	15-16 (including the perpetrator)	Former military man Genildo Ferreira de França kills 14 or 15 people and injures one in a 2-day shooting in Santo antônio do Potengi, in revenge for comments about his sexual orientation, before committing suicide when cornered by police.
Beco do Candeeiro Massacre	1998 July 10	Cuiabá, Mato Grosso	3	Three teenagers are shot to death by an unknown gunman.
Jaboticabal massacre	1999 April 10	Jaboticabal, São Paulo	3	Worker Edson de Oliveira Lima kills three young people aged 10, 12, and 18.
1999 Guarujá massacre	1999 June 9	Guarujá, São Paulo	4	Four men are shot dead in the Morro do Engenho favela, in Guarujá.
Campinas school shooting	1999 October 6	Campinas, Sao Paulo	3	Four armed men invaded the school and shot nine students and beat a tenth, killing three of them, before fleeing
Morumbi Shopping shooting	1999 November 3	Vila Cordeiro, São Paulo	3	4 wounded.
Salto massacre	2000 August 25	Salto, São Paulo	5	Five people, including three teenagers, are killed inside a house in downtown Salto.
Portuguese massacre	2001 August 12	Fortaleza, Ceara	6	A Portuguese immigrant lures six Portuguese businessmen with the promise of women; the perpetrator abducts the victims and beats them to death after drawing out 46 thousand reals from their credit cards.
Compaj massacre	2002 May 25	Manaus, Amazonas	13	
Bangu prison 1 riot	2002 September 11	Complexo Penitenciário de Gericinó, Gericinó, Rio de Janeiro	4-6	Between 4 and 6 inmates are murdered in a prison riot.
Roosevelt Reservation Massacre	2004 April 7	Espigão d'Oeste, Rondonia	29	29 prospectors are killed by Cinta Larga Indians after illegally entering the Indians' reservation.
Vertente do Lério massacre	2004 August 12	Vertente do Lério, Pernambuco	4	Four people are shot dead in Vertente do Lério.
Sé killings	2004 August 19–22	São Paulo	7	Seven homeless people are beaten to death in the centre of São Paulo. Two military police officers and a private security guard are subsequently charged with the killings. However, the charges are dropped on the grounds of insufficient evidence.
Parque Oeste massacre	2005 February 16	Goias	2	Landless farmers occupying a large ranch are shot by police. 40 wounded. Unknown missing. Over 20 killed in aftermath.
Baixada massacre	2005 March 31	Baixada Fluminense	29	A military police officer shoots and kills dozens of Brazilians after forming a gang, and was sentenced to 543 years in prison. 2 wounded.
May Crimes	2006 May 12–17; July 12–17	São Paulo (state) and other parts of the country	564	110 wounded.
Complexo do Alemão massacre	2007 June 27	Rio de Janeiro	19	
Ponte Nova Prison Massacre	2007 August 23	Ponte Nova, Minas Gerais	25	Prisoners escape and set fire to the cell of a group of rivals.
Arame Massacre	2009 April 8	Arame, Maranhão	6	Six criminals are killed by police officers during attempted postal bank robbery in Arame.
Rangel Killings	2009 July 9	Rangel, João Pessoa, Paraíba	5-7	Five members of the same family, including a woman pregnant with twins, are murdered with a knife and sickle.
Uberaba massacre	2009 October 3	Uberaba, Curitiba, Paraná	8	2 wounded.
Rio de Janeiro security crisis	2010 November 21–28	Rio de Janeiro	41	4 wounded.
Rio de Janeiro school shooting	2011 April 7	Rio de Janeiro	12	20 wounded. All are children aged 10–13.
Icoaraci Massacre	2011 November 19	Icoaraci, Belém, Pará	6	Six teenagers are murdered by an extermination group.
Pesseghini case	2013 August 5	Brasilândia, São Paulo	5	Five members of the Bovo Pesseghini family are killed.
Ouro Verde massacre	2014 January 12–13	Ouro Verde, Campinas, São Paulo	12	12 people are killed in a series of murders committed by five former military police officers in an area of Ouro Verde, Campinas.
Cabula Massacre	2015 February 6	Cabula, Salvador, Bahia	12	Police execute twelve black boys and men with shots to the neck in the Vila Moises area, in the Cabula neighborhood, in the city of Salvador; 6 wounded.
Pavilion 9 Massacre	2015 April 18	São Paulo	8	Murder of eight members of the Pavilion 9 fan organization of the Corinthians sport club, by three armed men.
Costa Barros Killings	2015 November 28	Costa Barros neighborhood, Rio de Janeiro	5	Murder of five young people by military police.
Agricultural Penitentiary of Monte Cristo riot	2016 October 16	Boa Vista, Roraima	25	
Campinas massacre	2016 December 31	Campinas, São Paulo	13 (including a perpetrator)	A man angry that his ex-wife left him went to a New Year's party his ex-wife's family was holding, and fatally shot her, her family, and his son; with 3 wounded, as well.
2017 Manaus Prison riot	2017 January 1	Manaus	56	
Military Police of Espírito Santo Strike	2017 February 4–25	Espírito Santo	215	215 people were killed in Espírito Santo during the violence.
Porto Seguro Massacre	2017 February 5	Porto Seguro Bahia	8	8 people killed and one injured by nine gunmen.
Pau D'Arco Massacre	2017 May 24	Fazenda Santa Lúcia, Pau d'Arco, Pará	10	17 military and civilian police shoot and kill 10 farm-occupying activists associated with the Landless Workers' Movement.
Janaúba massacre	2017 October 5	Minas Gerais	14	A daycare security guard locks himself in a room with children between the ages of 3 and 7, douses the children and the room with fuel, and sets the fuel alight; 37 wounded as well.
Compensa Massacre	2017 December 12	Compensa, Manaus, Amazonas	6	An armed group opens fire on football field in Manaus and kills six.
Fortaleza Nightclub Shooting	2018 January 27	Cajazeiras, Fortaleza	14	9 wounded.
Campinas Cathedral shooting	2018 December 11	Campinas, São Paulo	5 (including the perpetrator)	4 injured.
Suzano school shooting	2019 March 13	Suzano	10 (including the perpetrators)	Former students of a Brazilian school shoot up a car shop and then the school. 11 injured.
Belém bar shooting	2019 May 19	Belém, Pará	11	A group of heavily armed men — riding on a motorcycle and in three cars — go on a shooting rampage at a bar in Brazil, killing at least 11 people on a Sunday.
Amazonas prison massacres	2019 May 26–27	Amazonas	55	
2019 Altamira prison riot	2019 July 29	Altamira, Pará	62	16 prisoners are beheaded, and a further 41 people die from inhaling smoke from a fire lit at the beginning of the riot.
Saudades massacre	2021 May 4	Saudades, Santa Catarina	5	An 18-year-old man, Fabiano Kipper Mai, breaks into a daycare center with a machete in hand, killing 2 teachers and three children, as well as injuring a fourth. The attacker tries to commit suicide by cutting his neck, but survives and is rushed to the hospital.
2021 Rio de Janeiro shootout	2021 May 6	Jacarezinho, Rio de Janeiro	29	At least 29 people were killed in a shootout between police and drug traffickers
Ceilândia killings	2021 June 9	Ceilândia, Federal District	4	The Serial Killer Lázaro Barbosa de Souza kills four members of a family in Ceilândia.
Varginha Massacre	2021 October 31	Varginha, Minas Gerais	26	26 suspected members of a gang of bank robbers are killed in a police operation.
Sapiranga massacre	2021 December 25	Sapiranga, Fortaleza, Ceará	5	A group of hooded men shoot at a soccer field in the region of Sapiranga, in Fortaleza, leaving five dead and six injured.
Gamboa Massacre	2022 March 1	Gamboa, Salvador, Bahia	3	Police kill three young black men in the Gamboa community in Salvador.
Vila Cruzeiro shootout	2022 May 24	Rio de Janeiro	25	6 wounded
2022 Complexo do Alemão operation	2022 July 2022	Rio de Janeiro	19	
Aracruz school shootings	2022 November 25	Aracruz, Espírito Santo	4	A 16-year-old neo-nazi former student opens fire at two schools in Brazil, killing four and injuring 12.
Familicide in the Federal District	2023 January	Federal District	10	Murder of 10 people from the same family between the end of December 2022 and mid-January 2023.
Sinop massacre	2023 February 21	Sinop, Mato Grosso	7	Two gunmen opened fire at a bar in Sinop, killing seven people, including a 12-year-old girl.
Blumenau massacre	2023 April 5	Blumenau, Santa Catarina	4	5 wounded.
Barra da Tijuca killings	2023 October 5	Barra da Tijuca, Rio de Janeiro	3	Three doctors die and another is injured in an attack committed by criminals who mistook one of the victims for militiaman Taillon Barboza.
Lajes massacre	2024 September 7	Lajes Village, Nossa Senhora Aparecida, Sergipe	6	Six people are shot dead in a car in the village of Lajes, in Nossa Senhora Aparecida, after an argument during a snooker championship.
Heliópolis school shooting	2024 October 18	Heliópolis, Bahia	4 (including the perpetrator)	14-year-old student Samuel Santana Andrade fatally shoots three people before committing suicide.
Pantanal neighborhood Massacre	2025 May 4	Macapá, Amapá	7	Military police officers opened fire on a vehicle, killing 7 people.
Operation Containment	2025 October 28	North Zone, Rio de Janeiro	132	Police raids 26 communities in the North Zone of Rio de Janeiro. 132 killed, according to Public Defender's Office, including at least 4 police officers and 17 without prior criminal conviction.
Maracanã school shooting	2025 November 28	Maracanã, Rio de Janeiro	3 (including the perpetrador)	A 47-year-old João Antônio Miranda Tello Ramos Gonçalves broke into a school and shot and killed two employees before killing himself with a self-inflicted gunshot wound.
