= Operation Containment =

2025 police raids in Rio de Janeiro, Brazil

- Part of the Brazilian drug war
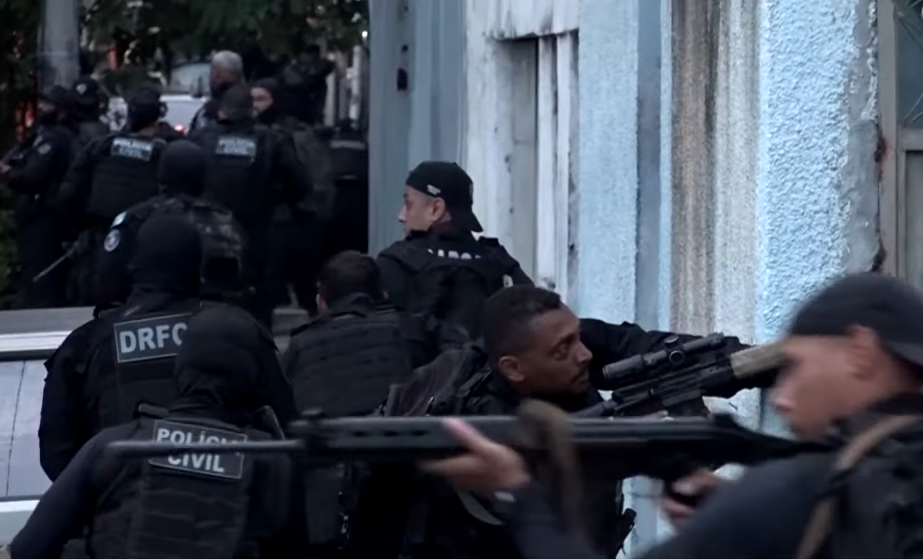
- Police officers during the operation.
Date	28 October 2025
Location	Alemão and Penha favelas, Rio de Janeiro, Brazil

Belligerents
Rio de Janeiro; Military Police; BOPE; BAC; Riot police; Mounted police; Civil Police; CORE	Comando Vermelho

Commanders and leaders
Cláudio Castro	Edgard Alves de Andrade

Strength
2,500 police officers 32 armored vehicles	Hundreds of criminals

Casualties and losses
5 police officers killed (2 BOPE and 3 CORE); 13 police officers injured (9 Military and 4 Civil), 2 in serious condition	Per police: 117 killed 133 arrested (Note: Including ~33 from other states); 118 weapons apprehended (Note: Including 93 Assault rifles); Per public defender: 128 killed (Note: At least 17 without prior criminal conviction)
- 4 civilians hit by stray bullets

Operation Containment (Portuguese: Operação Contenção) was a large-scale law-enforcement operation launched on 28 October 2025 by the Rio de Janeiro state government against the Comando Vermelho (CV) criminal organization. Approximately 2,500 police agents participated and executed hundreds of police warrants to arrest gang leaders in 26 communities in the North Zone of Rio de Janeiro, mainly in the Penha and Alemão neighborhoods.

Launched just before dawn, intense confrontations occurred all day. Gangs set barricades ablaze and used drone-dropped bombs on special forces teams. The operation seized 93 rifles, killed 122 people, and resulted in 133 arrests, according to police. State governor Cláudio Castro stated the casualties were criminals and called the operation "a success". A survey by AtlasIntel with local residents indicated that 8 in 10 of them supported the operation. In the rest of the Rio population, approval drops to 55%. At a national level, approval among favela residents also exceeds 80%, indicating a consensus in these communities. The deaths were mourned by relatives, while being criticized by national and international human rights groups for the lethality of police conduct, aside from questions regarding official claims that all the dead were criminals. According to Reuters' Brazilian correspondents, only five of those arrested were on the wanted list of 69 criminals and none of them were killed. However, more than 95% of the bodies identified had some connection with the Comando Vermelho. Of the 115 dead identified by the police, 108 had proven links to Comando Vermelho, with 97 having a relevant criminal history and 59 with arrest warrants.

The operation was the deadliest police action in the state's history in a favela, surpassing the 2021 Jacarezinho shootout that killed 28 people, and was also, overall, the deadliest in Brazilian history, exceeding the Carandiru massacre, where 111 inmates were killed in a prison riot in 1992.

== Background ==
According to the think tank InSight Crime, Comando Vermelho (CV) is the oldest criminal organization currently active in the country. It traces its origin to Falange Vermelha, a criminal organization created by eight inmates of Fundão, the LSN Gallery (Lei de Segurança Nacional), in the 1970s during the Brazilian military dictatorship, when political prisoners were incarcerated together with common prisoners at the Instituto Penal Cândido Mendes on Ilha Grande, influencing them with urban guerrilla tactics. The faction expanded over the following decades and consolidated networks in different Brazilian states. The Complexo do Alemão and Penha complexes became strategic areas for the CV for circulation, logistics, and revenue collection, with a history of leadership presence and heavy weaponry.

In 2024–2025, reports and coverage indicated intensified trafficking and greater professionalization of crews, including interstate and international routes, increasing pressure for large-scale actions against the CV. State authorities pointed to the presence of fugitives and CV operatives in the target areas, as well as the arrival of members from other regions of the country, reinforcing the view of “sanctuaries” for the faction in Rio.

Rio de Janeiro State police have often conducted large-scale operations against criminal organizations—mainly in favelas—ahead of major events in the city, such as the 2016 Summer Olympics and the 2024 G20 and 2025 BRICS summits. On the eve of events linked to the C40 Cities Climate Leadership Group (such as C40 and the Earthshot Prize), public security moved to the center of state and federal agendas, with signals of reinforced operations and inter-agency coordination. This operation occurred one week before the city hosted the summit events.

== Operation ==
The operation, which had been planned two months earlier, was launched in the early morning to execute around 100 arrest warrants, with 250 more warrants decreed during the operation. The teams that arrived at the locations in the morning faced strong resistance from drug traffickers, who quickly erected barriers and barricades, some on fire, in various areas of the two complexes. In retaliation, the criminals also used drones and bombs against the police.

The operation involved two helicopters, 12 demolition vehicles from the Military Police of Rio de Janeiro State's Special Police Operations Battalion (BOPE), 32 armored vehicles belonging to the National Public Security Force, and several ambulances; additionally, the Civil Police of Rio de Janeiro State mobilized all its specialized police units.

Authorities jailed 133 people, including 33 criminals from other states, and seized roughly one ton of drugs and 93 rifles, including weapons from the armies of Venezuela, Argentina, Peru and Brazil itself. Police claim 122 people died, but the public defender reported 132 dead, including five police officers; an unreported number of people were wounded. The following morning, locals found at least 70 bodies in a bush area near Favela da Penha, as well as a 19-year-old's severed head.

Edgard Alves de Andrade, known as "Doca", who is the main leader of Comando Vermelho, managed to escape Operation Containment. According to Victor Santos, Rio de Janeiro's Secretary of Public Security, the leader used drug trafficking "soldiers" to create a barrier and escape the operation. Among the arrested were Thiago do Nascimento Mendes, one of the leaders of Comando Vermelho in the region, and Nicolas Fernandes Soares, identified as Doca's financial operator.

== Aftermath ==
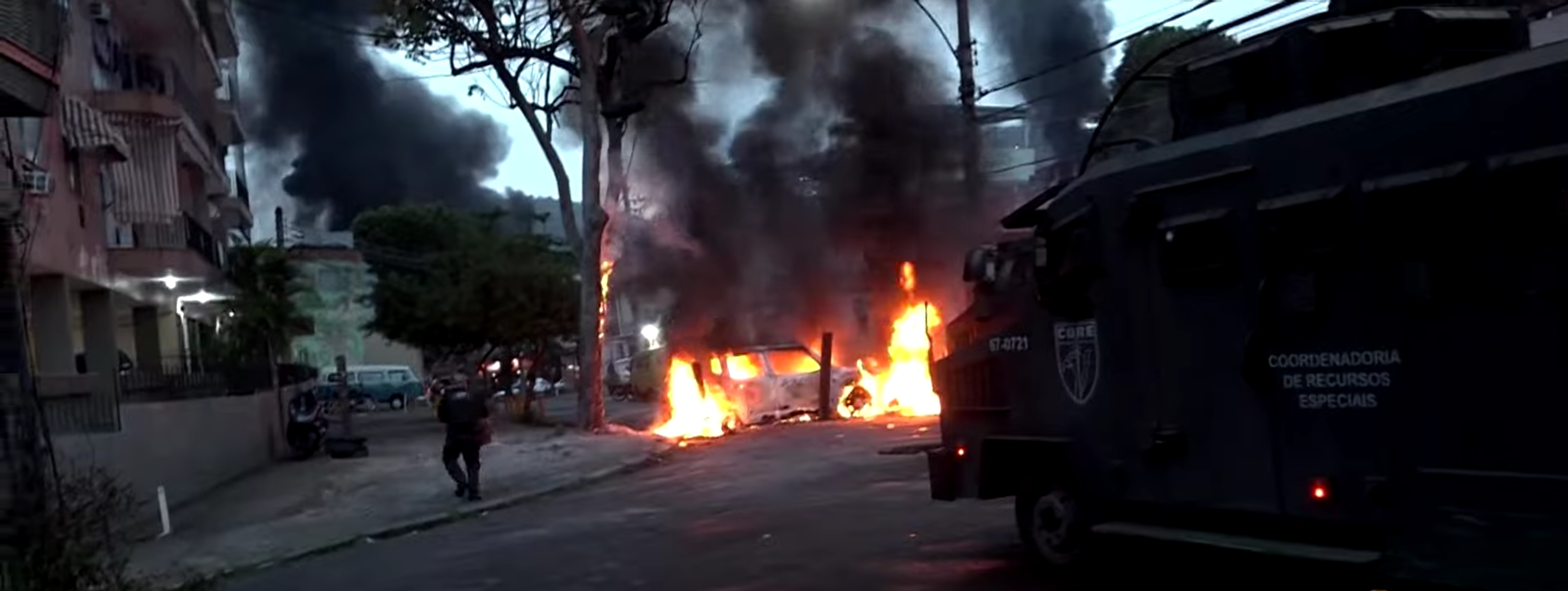
A CORE armored car next to a vehicle set ablaze during the operation

In revenge, the gangs blocked several roads including the Avenida Brasil, Yellow and Red Lines using 71 stolen buses, which forced people to walk home. Healthcare, education and transportation were disrupted. Neighboring municipalities São Gonçalo and Niterói were also affected by the blockades.

Trains, subways, light rail, and ferries continued to operate normally. There were occasional queues at access points due to the high number of passengers attempting to board simultaneously on their early return home.

The Military Police also reported shootings by criminals from Morro do Dezoito, in Água Santa, who fired shots at the Yellow Line.

The city's Education Department closed 46 schools across the Penha and Alemão neighborhoods, and the Federal University of Rio de Janeiro (located in Cidade Universitária) canceled night classes, advising people on campus to seek shelter.

The day after the operation, information provided to the anonymous tip line led to the capture of three suspects who had fled the operation and hidden in the Campinho neighborhood: Luiz Carlos Mourão de Matos, Celso Luiz Gitahy Ferreira, and Rodrigo dos Santos Lourenço. Weapons, ammunition, and drugs were found in the house where they were arrested.

== Reactions ==
=== Domestic ===
Cláudio Castro, governor of the state of Rio de Janeiro, declared the city "at war" and called the operation the largest ever targeting the Comando Vermelho gang. He stated that Brazil "stands firm confronting narcoterrorism".

Eduardo Paes, mayor of Rio de Janeiro, stated the city "could not be held hostage by criminal groups".

The state's civil police declared that the "cowardly attacks" by criminals against its officers would not go unpunished.

Ricardo Lewandowski, minister of justice and public security, said the federal government had not received any request for support from state authorities prior to the operation. After the operation, to help dismantle the gang's ongoing command structure, the federal government authorized the transfer of at least ten Comando Vermelho leaders to federal prisons in other states.

Gleisi Hoffmann, secretary of institutional affairs and a member of the Chamber of Deputies, agreed on the need for coordinated actions, but cited a recent federal crackdown on money laundering as an example of the federal government's efforts against organized crime.

The rapporteur for the proposed amendment to the Constitution known as "PEC for Public Security", Deputy Mendonça Filho from Democrats (PE), said that he will bring forward the presentation of his report to November of same year.

On 29 October, after a meeting with minister of his cabinet, President Luiz Inácio Lula da Silva condemned organized crime, emphasizing that a coordinated effort targeting the core of the trafficking network without putting innocent police officers, children, and families at risk is needed and defended the amendment, cited as a guarantee to improve the public safety.

President of the Federal Senate Davi Alcolumbre from the Brazil Union (AP) released a statement in which he affirms that he has ordered the installation of the Parliamentary Commission of Inquiry (CPI) on Organized Crime which will begin on 4 November of same year.

On 29 October, Supreme Court Justice Alexandre de Moraes ruled that the governor of Rio de Janeiro, Cláudio Castro, must send information about the operation carried out in the state capital within the scope of the Argument of Non-Compliance with Fundamental Precept (APDF) of the Favelas.

On 29 October, protests were held in front of the Guanabara Palace, the seat of the state government. Two days after the operation, relatives of the deceased protested on Francisco Bicalho Avenue, in front of the local morgue where the bodies were located, because they had not received any information about their relatives. Congressman Reimont (PT-RJ) was negotiating with the participants for the peaceful release of the road, but before this could be done, the military police broke up the protest, using pepper spray to clear the road, which is one of the access routes to the city center.

On 31 October, three days after the police action, a demonstration with residents dressed in white on motorcycles rode through the streets of the Penha neighborhood. The demonstration included activists and politicians such as city councilwoman Mônica Benício, widow of Marielle Franco, and congressmen Glauber Braga and Tarcísio Motta, all from PSOL. Nineteen demonstrations were called for the same day in various cities across the country.

According to an AtlasIntel poll conducted the following day, 87.6% of residents of the favelas (the Brazilian term for slums) in the city of Rio de Janeiro supported the operation. Meanwhile, human rights activists and international organizations, like the United Nations, condemned the violence by the state and demanded an investigation of the situation.

=== International ===
- Argentina: The government classified Comando Vermelho and Primeiro Comando da Capital as "terrorist groups" and activated "maximum alert" across the Argentina–Brazil border, with Patricia Bullrich, minister of National Security, stating that all Brazilians traveling to the country would be "thoroughly" inspected. On 1 November, three men from the state of Rio de Janeiro were arrested by Argentine police while crossing the border from Brazil into Argentina through an illegal crossing. They were suspected of belonging to Comando Vermelho.
- Colombia: President Gustavo Petro called the operation "barbaric" and compared it to the 2002 Operation Orion, which occurred in Comuna 13, Medellín.
- Paraguay: The Paraguayan government reinforced policing along its borders with Brazilian territory after receiving information about the risk of escape by drug traffickers from the Comando Vermelho (CV).
- United Nations: The Office of the United Nations High Commissioner for Human Rights declared it was "horrified" by the deadly police operation and called for police reform in Brazil.
- US: The United States Department of State issued a security alert for travelers following the massive police operation against Comando Vermelho in Rio de Janeiro.

== See also ==
- 1923 federal intervention in Rio de Janeiro – Brazilian political crisis
- 2010 Rio de Janeiro security crisis – Major security crisis in Brazil
- 2018 federal intervention in Rio de Janeiro
- Baixada massacre – Massacre in a favela in Rio de Janeiro, Brazil
- Brazilian militias – Brazilian mafia and corrupt police groups
- Complexo do Alemão massacre – 2007 police raid in Rio de Janeiro, Brazil
- Crime in Brazil
- Vila Cruzeiro shootout – Police Operation in Rio De Janeiro
