= Doca da Penha =

Brazilian drug trafficker, Comando Vermelho leader

- Born: Edgard Alves de Andrade; 24 January 1970 (age 56); Caiçara, Paraíba, Brazil
- Other names: Urso ("Bear")
- Organization: Comando Vermelho
- Criminal charges: Formation of a criminal gang, homicide, drug trafficking
- Criminal status: Fugitive

Edgard Alves de Andrade (born 24 January 1970), better known as Doca da Penha or Urso ("Bear"), is a Brazilian criminal identified as one of the main leaders of the Comando Vermelho criminal organization. He is currently believed to be leading drug trafficking operations in the Penha Complex. He is also called Edgar by Brazilian media.

== Biography ==
Doca was born on 24 January 1970, in Caiçara, Paraíba. He arrived in Rio de Janeiro in the 90s, where he joined the drug trade in Morro São Simão, in Queimados, in the Baixada Fluminense region. In 2007, he was arrested for illegal possession of a firearm and drug trafficking in the Penha neighborhood, in the northern zone of Rio de Janeiro. At the time, he told the police officers that he was a military serviceman. Years later, his sentence was reduced, and he was transferred to a semi-open prison regime. While on the run, Doca assumed an important role in the criminal organization.

His criminal record, consisting of 189 pages, listed 176 criminal entries by 2023. The majority were for drug trafficking, criminal association, cargo robberies and thefts, homicides, torture, and illegal possession of firearms. In 2021, Doca was indicted for the disappearance, torture, and murder of three boys who allegedly had stolen pet birds in the Castelar favela in Belford Roxo.

In October 2023, Doca was identified as the mastermind behind the execution of three doctors and the attempted murder of a fourth man in Barra da Tijuca, in the Southwest Zone of Rio de Janeiro. The victims were attending a medical congress and were mistaken for members of the Rio das Pedras militia. The criminals who according to the police were authorized by Doca, mistook one of the doctors for Taillon de Alcântara Pereira Barbosa, the son of a militiaman. Upon learning of the mistake, Doca allegedly ordered the killing of his accomplices as well.

In 2025, he was charged by the Rio de Janeiro State Public Prosecutor's Office for an attack on a police station in the city of Duque de Caxias, in the state's Baixada Fluminense region. The attack aimed to rescue the drug trafficker Rodolfo Manhães Viana, known as "Rato." On October 28 of the same year, a major police operation was carried out in the Penha and Alemão complexes to serve arrest warrants against members of the Comando Vermelho, including Doca, with a reward of 100,000 reais for information leading to his capture. According to authorities, Doca managed to escape the a major police operation with the support of the Comando Vermelho members who formed an armed barrier to prevent his capture.

As the leader of the Comando Vermelho, Doca is considered one of the main figures responsible for the group's expansion in recent years. Between 2022 and 2023, the organization increased the areas under its control by 8.4% and regained the leadership it had lost to the militias in previous years. By 2025, it accounts for 51.9% of the areas dominated by armed groups in the Rio de Janeiro Metropolitan Area.
