= 2021 Rio de Janeiro shootout =

- Part of Brazilian drug war
Date	6 May 2021; 5 years ago
Location	Jacarezinho Slum, Rio de Janeiro, Brazil

Belligerents
Civil Police of Rio de Janeiro State	Comando Vermelho

Strength
~200 officers 4 armored vehicles 2 helicopters	

Casualties and losses
1 killed 2 wounded	28 killed 10 arrested
- 2 civilians injured

Jacarezinho
- Neighborhood
- Location in Rio de Janeiro Jacarezinho (Brazil)
- Coordinates: 22°53′13″S 43°15′37″W
- Country: Brazil
- State: Rio de Janeiro
- Municipality/City: Rio de Janeiro
- Zone: North Zone

On 6 May 2021, at least 29 people were killed in a shootout between police and drug traffickers in Rio de Janeiro, Brazil. The raid occurred in Jacarezinho, Rio de Janeiro, a favela notable for its high crime rate. The raid occurred at approximately 11 a.m. local time, following reports that a local drug gang was recruiting children.

== Background ==
Drug trafficking makes up for an increasingly large portion of crime in Brazil. In 2005, military police killed 29 civilians in Baixada Fluminense, Rio. In 2006, an officer was convicted in relation to it. A crisis occurred in Rio in 2010. A total of 27% of all incarcerations in Brazil are the result of drug trafficking charges. Between 2007 and 2012 the number of drug related incarcerations has increased from 60,000 to 134,000; a 123 percent increase. Gang violence in Brazil has become an important issue affecting the youth. Brazilian gang members have used children to commit crimes because their prison sentences are shorter. As of 2007, murder was the most common cause of death among youth in Brazil, with 40% of all murder victims aged between 15 and 25 years old.

== Raid ==
The raid began on 6 May 2021 at approximately 11:00am local time. Police entered the Jacarezinho neighbourhood in Rio de Janeiro in armoured vehicles following reports that a local drug gang was recruiting children. The police faced concrete barriers placed by criminals to impede entry to the favela. A shootout began between police and drug traffickers, in which at least 28 people were killed. One police officer was killed and two wounded. Two passengers on a nearby metro train were hit by bullets fired during the shootout. The shootout resulted in the highest death toll from a police raid in Rio de Janeiro until Operation Containment.

Rio police detective Felipe Curi told reporters that several criminals attempted to hide in neighbouring residences. The police seized a shotgun, a submachine gun, six rifles, 16 pistols, and 12 grenades. At least six suspects were arrested. On 7 May the police announced a death toll of 27 among suspects, 3 more than previously reported.

== Reactions ==
Following the raid, approximately 50 Jacarezinho residents marched in the streets shouting "justice" behind a group from the state legislatures human rights commission.

In a statement, Human Rights Watch called upon the public prosecutor to immediately investigate possible police abuses.

== See also ==
- 2010 Rio de Janeiro security crisis
- Mexican drug war
- Vila Cruzeiro shootout
