= José Beltrame =

Brazilian writer and lawyer (born 1957)

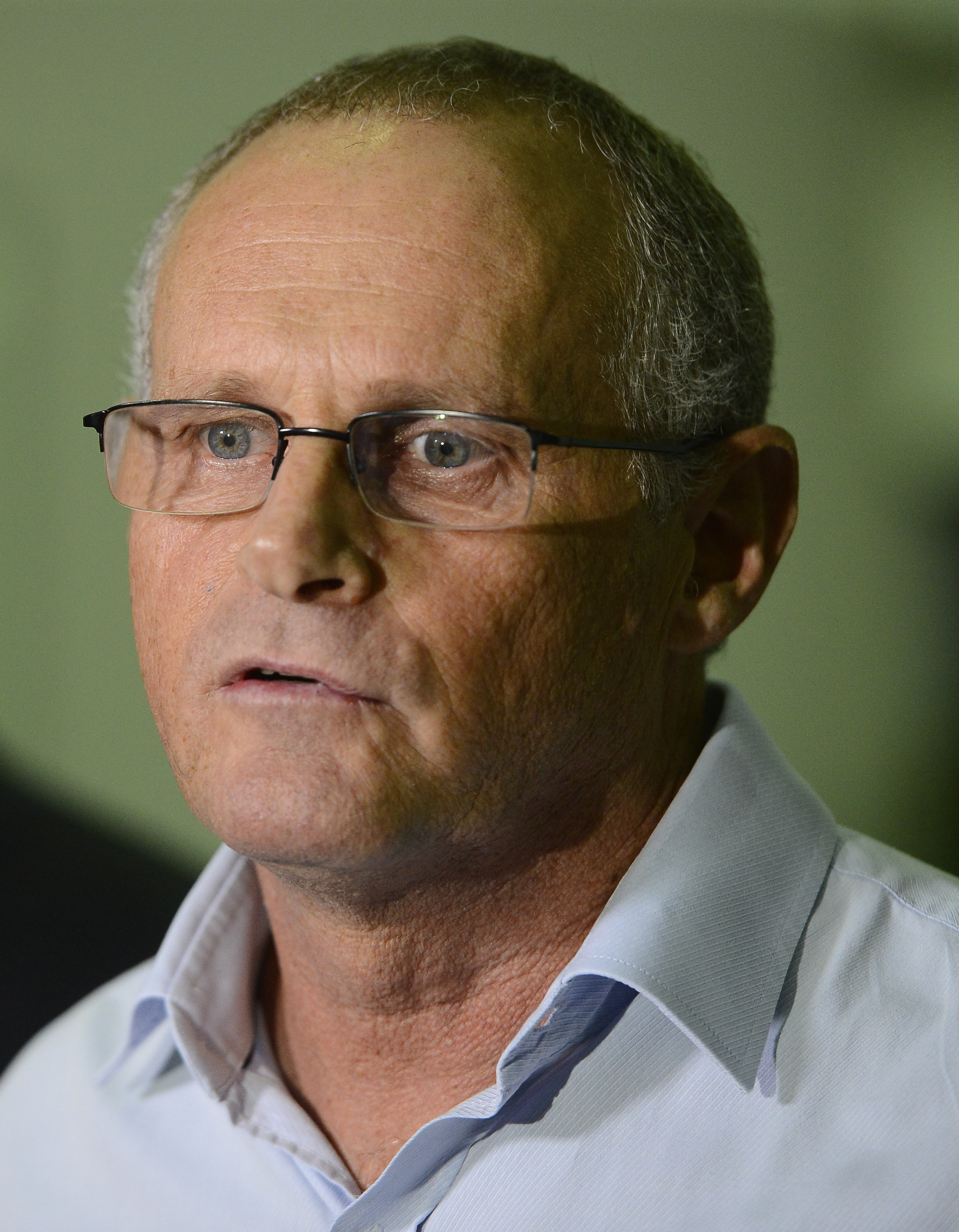
Beltrame, in 2016

José Mariano Benincá Beltrame (born 13 May 1957) is a Brazilian federal police commissioner and former Secretary of Security of Rio de Janeiro.

== Biography ==
Beltrame was born in Santa Maria, in a family of Italian descent. He graduated in Law from the Federal University of Santa Maria as well as Business and Public Administration from the Federal University of Rio Grande do Sul. He specialized in Strategic Intelligence at the Salgado de Oliveira University and the War College. He attended the Intelligence course of the National Secretary of Public Security and Police Intelligence Data Analysis, Guardian System programs.

=== Public life ===
Beltrame joined the Federal Police in 1981 as an agent, mainly in the area of narcotics repression He served in the intelligence sector, fighting organized crime in several states. He taught classes and lectures at the Postgraduate Course in Intelligence and Public Security at the Federal University of Mato Grosso. In the Rio de Janeiro Federal Police he served as Superintendence and he was the coordinator of Mission Support, head of the Intelligence Service and Interpol.

==== Projects ====
Beltrame was one of the creators of the Pacifying Police Unit, the UPPs, applied in the state of Rio de Janeiro and with possible expansion to the state of Pernambuco and others. In November 2010, he was one of the main articulators of the Vila Cruzeiro favela takeover operation and following the invasion to Complexo do Alemão at Rio de Janeiro, in 2007. In this operation, over 42 tonnes of cannabis, 330 kg of cocaine, crack, heavy weaponry, large amounts of ammunition, cars and motorcycles, as well as disruption in drug trafficking with the arrest of several drug trafficking chiefs.
