= Baixada massacre =

Massacre in a favela in Rio de Janeiro, Brazil

Coordinates: 22.810°S 43.310°W

The Baixada massacre (Portuguese: Chacina da Baixada), was a violent incident that occurred in Baixada Fluminense, Rio de Janeiro, Brazil, on March 31, 2005. A group of police officers entered the Vigário Geral favela (shantytown) in the Baixada Fluminense region in the state of Rio de Janeiro in pursuit of suspected drug traffickers.

During the operation, the police officers indiscriminately opened fire on civilians, resulting in the deaths of at least 29 people. Many of the victims were unarmed, including women and children, and some were killed in their own homes.

The Baixada massacre was one of the deadliest incidents in a wave of police violence that occurred in Rio de Janeiro onward from the 1990s. It sparked widespread public outrage and led to calls for police reform and greater accountability for law enforcement officials. The incident also highlighted the broader issue of police brutality and human rights violations in Brazil.

== Operation ==
The Brazilian government launched an investigation into the Baixada massacre, and several police officers were ultimately convicted and sentenced to prison for their role in the incident. However, many people in Brazil continue to criticize the government for its handling of the case and for failing to adequately address the issue of police violence in the country.

In August 2006, a military police officer, Carlos Jorge Carvalho, was convicted of 29 homicides, an attempted murder and forming a criminal gang. He was sentenced to 543 years imprisonment.

This was one of many massacres in Brazil. They include the Candelária massacre and Vigário Geral massacre, which were also committed by the police in Rio in 1993.
