= Helmet massacre =

The Helmet massacre (Portuguese: massacre do Capacete [mɐˈsakɾi ðu kɐpɐˈsetʃi]) of the Ticuna people took place in March 1988, in the municipality of Benjamin Constant, in the Alto Solimões region, in a remote area in the state of Amazonas. Funai, the National Foundation for the Indians, had begun to demarcate the Ticuna land, giving rise to reactions from local squatters. The indigenous people were gathered in an assembly and were unarmed when they were attacked. During the massacre four people died, nineteen were wounded, and ten disappeared in the Solimões river. It was initially treated as homicide. Since 1994 it has been treated by the Brazilian courts as a genocide. Thirteen men were convicted of genocide in 2001. In November 2004 at the appeal before Brazil's federal court, Castelo Branco, the man initially found guilty of hiring men to carry out the genocide was acquitted, and the other men had their initial sentences of 15–25 years reduced to 12 years.

== See also ==
- List of massacres in Brazil
