= Pesseghini family murders =

2013 familicide in São Paulo, Brazil

- Location: Brasilândia, São Paulo, São Paulo, Brazil
- Date: 4-5 August 2013; 13 years ago
- Attack type: Familicide; murder-suicide
- Weapon: .40-caliber semi-automatic pistol
- Victims: 5 (Including the perpetrator)
- Perpetrator: Marcelo Eduardo Bovo Pesseghini
- Motive: Unknown, possible psychosis caused by hypoxic encephalopathy

Between late August 4 and early August 5, 2013, 5 members of the Bovo Pesseghini family were murdered inside their home in Brasilândia, São Paulo.

Among the victims were Andreia Regina Bovo Pesseghini, corporal of the 1st Company of the 18th Military Police Battalion, based in Freguesia do Ó and mother of Marcelo; Benedita Oliveira Bovo, mother of corporal Andreia and grandmother of Marcelo; Bernardete Oliveira da Silva, sister of Benedita and great-aunt of Marcelo; Luis Marcelo Pesseghini, ROTA Sergeant and father of Marcelo; and Marcelo Eduardo Bovo Pesseghini, son of the police couple and suspect of the crime.

The victims' bodies were buried on August 6, 2013, in Gethsêmani Anhanguera Cemitery in Rodovia Anhanguera. The premature closure of the case by the Brazilian justice system was surrounded by a series of criticisms and controversies. After several attempts to reopen the case in the Brazilian justice system, the case was reported to the Organization of American States in the United States in 2018.

== Crime ==
On the night of August 5, 2013, five members of the same family were found dead inside their home in Brasilândia, in the northern zone of São Paulo. Among the victims were Corporal Andreia Regina Bovo Pesseghini, 35 years old, and her husband, Sergeant Luis Marcelo Pesseghini, 40 years old. The couple's son, Marcelo Eduardo Bovo Pesseghini, 13 years old, was also found dead, just like Andreia's mom, Benedita Oliveira Bovo, 65 years old, and Benedita's sister, Bernardete Oliveira da Silva, 55 years old.

== Investigations ==
Investigators ruled out the possibility of the crime being an attack on the two military police officers by criminals and began to consider the hypothesis of a family tragedy: the couple's son, Marcelo, was believed to have shot his parents, grandmother, and great-aunt before committing suicide. Marcelo was believed to have used his mother’s .40-caliber semi-automatic pistol to carry out the murders.

Elizabete Sato, the head of the Department of Homicide and Protection of Persons (DHPP), stated that other possibilities, such as a crime of passion or revenge, had not been ruled out. According to the deputy, the crime scene was not properly preserved for forensic analysis when civilian police arrived to respond to the incident on the day of the crime, August 5, 2013, shortly after 6 pm. On that day, about 200 police officers went to the house where the family was killed.

Prosecutor Luiz Fernando Bugiga Rebellato gave a favorable opinion for a new request to extend the investigations by another thirty days. This request was made on the grounds that the completion of the work depended on additional data related to the cellphone records found in the house.

Based on a psychiatric report on the profile of Marcelo Pesseghini (a retrospective post-mortem examination of mental sanity), which was based on analyses from testimonies and interviews, and signed by forensic psychiatrist Guido Palomba, it was pointed out that the student suffered from "hypoxic encephalopathy" (lack of oxygenation in the brain), which led him to develop an "encapsulated delirium." The psychiatrist compared this loss of the sense of reality experienced by Pesseghini to that of the character in the video game Assassin's Creed.

The Civil Police, the Public Prosecutor's Office, and the Court of Justice of São Paulo concluded that the boy was the murderer. However, the Military Police continued to investigate the case. On October 15, 2014, the Military Police requested a copy of the completed police inquiry report from the special department of the Court of Justice. The justification, signed by Major Laerte Fidelis, stated that there was a need to complete the inquiry that was investigating the circumstances surrounding the death of Corporal Andréia. This inquiry was attempting to clarify the corruption allegations made by her. Lieutenant Colonel Wagner Dimas, who had initially expressed doubt that the boy had killed the family, had been suspended but later resumed command of the unit.

== Repercussion ==
=== International ===
Newspapers and websites from all around the world reported on the crime involving a cop family in São Paulo, including the Spanish version of the website Terra Networks, the Daily Mirror, Telecinco (Spain), among others.

=== Ubisoft ===
The game company Ubisoft, creator of the franchise Assassin's Creed, published a statement of condolences to the Pesseghini family, refuting the thesis that the game had influenced Marcelo to kill his family. News websites boasted the young man's profile on social media that had the photo of the game's protagonist. An excerpt from the statement reads:

"In no study yet conducted has there been a consensus on the association between violence and works of fiction, including books, television shows, movies and games. It's a fallacy to associate an object of entertainment to millions of people, all day, in the whole world, with individual actions and that are still being clarified. Again, it is a tragedy without sense and our thoughts and prayers are with the family and friends of the victims [...] We thank the series fans that showed their support against sensationalists messages associating the game with the tragedy and invite everyone to show solidarity with the family and friends of the victims."

=== In Brazil ===
In 2013, a Facebook page called "It wasn't Marcelo Eduardo Bovo Pesseghini" was created. In one day after its creation, the page had three thousand likes. It was analyzed by the newspaper O Popular. A protest was organized in favor of Marcelo Pesseghini by the Facebook page. 800 people marked their presence. In it, the investigation would be questioned. It was supposed to be in front of the DHPP in August 2013. No one attended it. During the same time, the police started to share information that pointed to Marcelo Pesseghini as the only person responsible for the crime. Marcelo Rezende said that "the police put the death of the parents, grandmother and great-aunt on a boy. And the game appeared in the center of the investigation".

== Controversies ==
=== IstoÉ criticism ===
Antonio Carlos Prado, writing for the magazine IstoÉ critiqued in several points the way the police shared the details about the case to the media in 2013, calling it "information monopoly".

[In the Pesseghini Case] the police declared only what they wanted and the way they wanted it. [...] It came to a point where the Police's command declared that he wouldn't comment on the case when the possibility came up that the slaughter was fruit of rivalries between policemen (but if the command doesn't comment, then who will?). The deputy that looks over the case reiterated 'everything is being investigated', without ever translating that 'everything' into evidence and investigating in one single direction: the teenager's responsibility. [...]

When their superior officer put on the agenda the thesis of crime of passion or revenge, half an hour didn't even pass and a 'clarification note' of the press office of the Security Secretariat recanted everything. [...] The police declared that the crime scene 'was not suitable' for forensics. There's a difference between a not suitable scene and a scene that's not preserved; the first one is when someone intentionally changes the scenario to confuse and the second one is when a lot of people that shouldn't be at the crime scene show up and end up 'contaminating' it. [...]

Well, if it was the teenager who killed, he would be the only one interested in transforming the place in 'not suitable'. But how would he do that after committing suicide? According to forensics, all the blood on the walls and the ceiling of the environment were cleaned by the boy. Is that not too much for him? And the exam for traces of gunpowder in his hands and gloves that he wore came back negative. How do we stand? No one answers that question, and so the police puts itself in discredit: 83% of Paulists don't believe in the official version.

- Antonio Carlos Prado

=== Witnesses ===
A neighbor says she saw a policeman in uniform and another man jumping over the wall of the family house, at around 12pm on Monday, August 5th. When they were leaving the residence they commented that the family was dead. However, the police only showed up at 7pm, with the corporation informing that it was notified after 6pm on August 5th.

The neighbor says she doesn't believe Marcelo Pesseghini killed the family and that the targeting of the assassination was the mom, because she "was investigating something wrong in Freguesia do Ó" and she was found dead "on her knees" as she begged to not be shot. She also stated that a silver Meriva car was around the Pesseghini house for months and passed information about the residence, car and who visited it.

The brother of Bernardete and Benedita, and Andreia's uncle, that didn't want to be identified, said that he got two calls that would be from Marcelo's school, right after stepping into the house, when the bodies were found. The woman's voice said, 'Is this Marcelinho's house?'. He said, 'Who wants to talk to him?'. And she said, 'It's from the school, it's because Marcelinho didn't come to school today'.

== See also ==
- Campinas Massacre
