= Caiçara, Paraíba =

Caiçara
- Municipality
- The Municipality of Caiçara
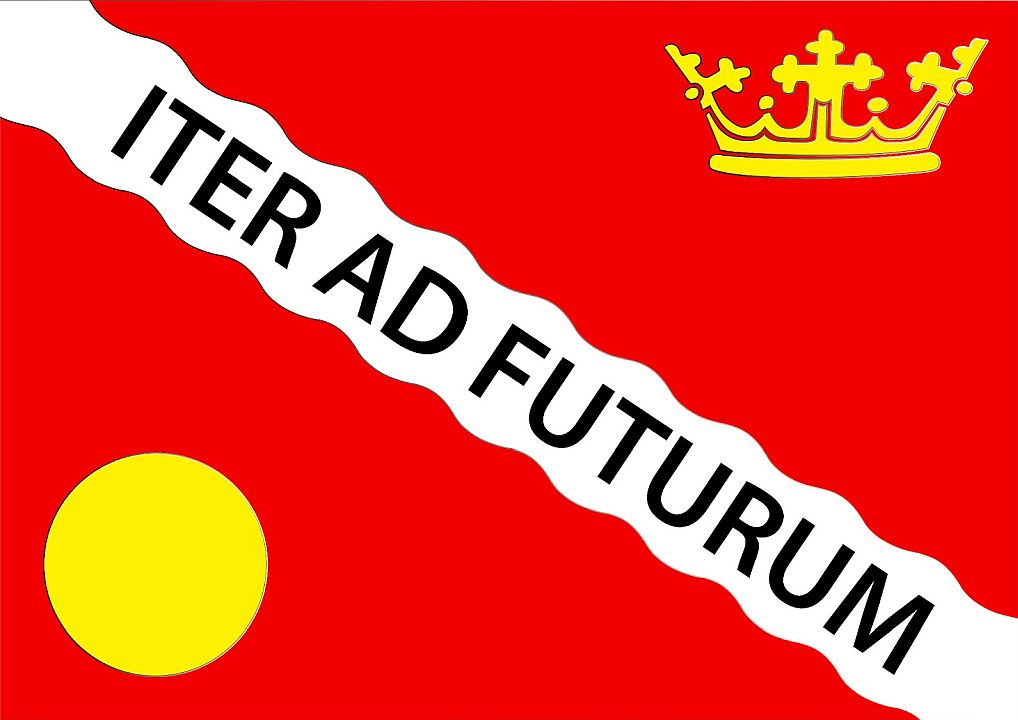
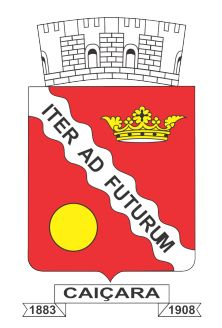
- Flag Coat of arms

- Location of Caiçara in the State of Paraíba
- Coordinates: 06°33′14″S 35°24′39″W
- Country: Brazil
- Region: Northeast
- State: Paraíba
- Founded: November 7, 1908

Government
  - Mayor: Hugo Antonio Lisboa Alves (PMDB)

Area
  - Total: 127.911 km^{2} (49.387 sq mi)
- Elevation: 150 m (490 ft)

Population (2020)
  - Total: 7,191
  - Density: 56.22/km^{2} (145.6/sq mi)
- Time zone: UTC−3 (BRT)
- HDI (2000): 0.576 – medium

Caiçara (Central northeastern portuguese pronunciation: [kɐjˈsaɾɐ]) is a municipality in the Brazilian state of Paraíba.
