= Vigário Geral massacre =

1993 Brazilian massacre

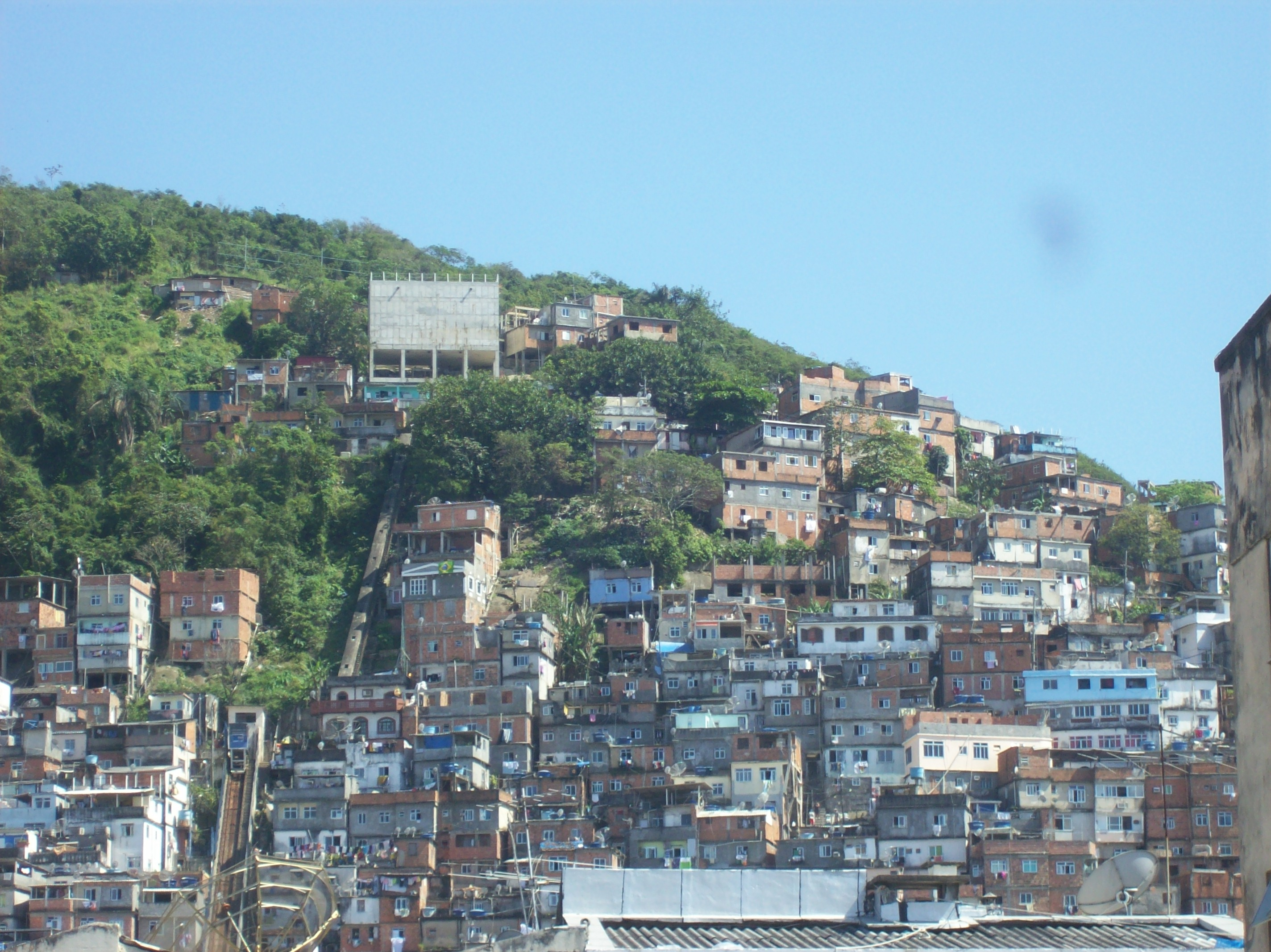
2006 picture of Favelas (slums) in Río de Janeiro

The Vigário Geral Massacre (Chacina de Vigário Geral in Portuguese) occurred on August 29, 1993, at the favela of Vigário Geral, located in the north of Rio de Janeiro city. The favela was invaded by a death squad formed by 36 hooded and armed men, that broke in houses and executed 21 people. The Vigária Geral massacre was one of the biggest massacres in the Rio de Janeiro state.

Out of the 51 accused, only one was still in prison: the ex-military policeman Sirlei Alves Teixeira, who was found dead by neighbors on March 9, 2021, fallen on the steps that gave access to his house. The neighbors thought that the ex-policeman had had a heart attack. With the arrival of SAMU (Brazilian ambulance service), it was listed that the ex-military policeman had been executed. He was serving his sentence in a semi-open regime and had authorization to work outside of the prison and for family visits. Because of the Covid-19 pandemic, Sirlei had been on house arrest since the past year.

The Vigário Geral massacre of 1993 came to be tried in the Organization of American States as a crime against human rights.

== Background ==
According to reports, the massacre was motivated by the killing of four police officers on the 28th in the Catolé da Rocha Square, in the Vigário Geral neighborhood).

The event was a trap set for the Sargent by drug dealers that wanted to get rid of Ailton and the informant Ivan Custódio, both partners of fishing boats in Sepetiba-RJ.

The killings were attributed to the local drug dealers and the massacre occurred as a way of police retaliation, even though none of the victims had any involvement with drug trafficking.

"Among the deceased were seven men playing cards in a bar and eight members of a family, including a 15-year-old girl, killed inside their home."

A majority of the victim's family didn't receive compensation by the State.

== Sentencing ==
After the federal and Rio de Janeiro state governments commenced a series of official investigations that year, charges were brought against thirty three people: twenty-eight military policemen who were believed to belong to infamous death squad "Cavalos Corredores" (the "Galloping Horses"), three civil policemen and two civilian employees of the civil police.

By 1998, the number of people charged increased to the total of fifty-two, but only two had actually been convicted thus far.

Of those fifty-two, five without evidence. The first ten to be sentences, had evidence of innocence, recording tapes with the confessions of the real perpetrators. Among the innocent there's Sérgio "Borjão" Cerqueira Borges, that also recorded tapes with the strategies of the crime and its authors.

The tapes were considered "illegal evidence" because the accused and the true authors or "Cavalos Corredores" weren't aware of the recordings done by Borjão.

Six policeman had been convicted as of 2003, yet according to a BBC newspaper published in August, only two were actually in prison as the other four were released with the expiration of the time periods for their appeal hearings.

== Implications of the Vigário Geral massacre ==
The theme that has continued to dominate Brazilian society from the early twentieth century up until the present, is the accepting attitude held by middle-upper class citizens and policemen towards the use of violence. Police violence directed towards citizens continues to be a problem in Brazil decades after the 1993 Vigário Geral Massacre, and is evident in its murder statistics. In one annual Brazilian Forum on Public Security report, it found that police killed 2,212 people in 2013, and increasing to a total of 3,022 the following year, Brazil's national murder rate was 30 deaths for every 100,000 people. This data contrasts greatly with that of the United States, which, according to the FBI's Criminal Justice Information Services Division crime report of 2013, had a much lower rate of only 4.5 murders for every 100,000 people.

One major factor that directly contributes to Brazil's high murder rate (police killing citizens, and citizens killing each other and officers) are its laws on both intentional and unintentional murder. According to Brazil's homicide laws, the penalty for intentional murder ranges from six to twenty years of imprisonment except in more severe instances which it could increase to thirty, and only one to three years for unintentional homicides. As if to favor those who commit serious felonies, Brazilian law states that the maximum penalty for any crime is 30 years, and those sentenced to more than 19 years in prison are automatically granted retrials.

In 1998, Chicago Tribune Foreign Correspondent Laurie Goering made several interesting points in her article, showing that there was more to Brazil's murder culture than just its comparatively (to the U.S. and elsewhere) lenient laws. Due to the fact that Brazil's court systems were slow, inconsistent, saw only 8 percent of all cases, and brought "showy sentences" with small jail time, Goering explained that "most people favor street justice by police, including executions of criminals caught in the act."

== See also ==
- List of massacres in Brazil
