= Sinop massacre =

Mass shooting in Sinop, Mato Grosso, Brazil

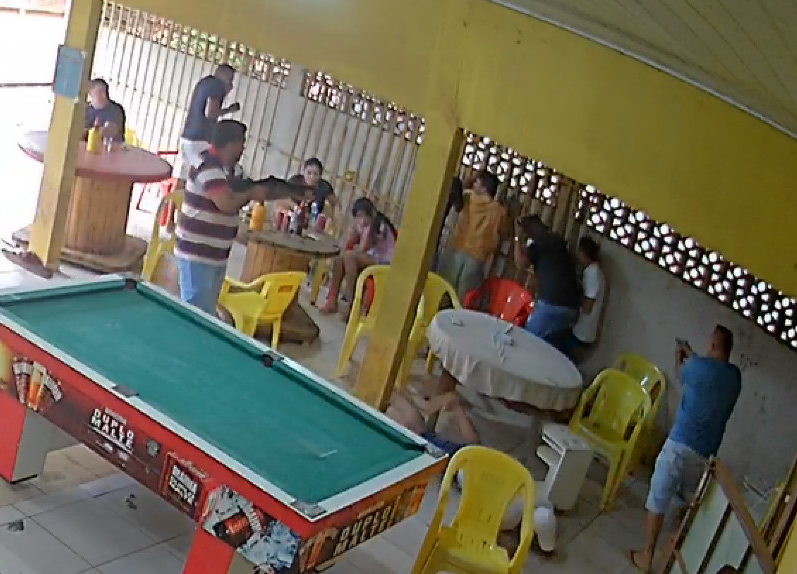

- Sinop (Brazil)
- Location: Sinop, Mato Grosso, Brazil
- Date: 21 February 2023; 3 years ago
- Attack type: Mass shooting; armed robbery
- Weapons: CBC Pump Military 3.0 12-gauge pump-action shotgun (Edgar); .380 ACP pistol (Ezequias)
- Deaths: 7
- Perpetrators: Ezequias Souza Ribeiro; Edgar Ricardo de Oliveira
- Motive: Anger over loss at pool game

On February 21, 2023, a mass shooting occurred at a bar in Sinop, Mato Grosso, Brazil. After losing R$20,000 (US$3,575.9) in a pool game, Ezequias Souza Ribeiro and Edgar Ricardo de Oliveira returned with firearms and shot and killed seven people, including one child. The two shooters then fled the scene. Ribeiro was killed in a shootout with police the following day, while Oliveira surrendered to police on February 23.

== Shooting ==
On February 21, 2023, a Carnival day, 27-year-old Ezequias Souza Ribeiro and 30-year-old Edgar Ricardo de Oliveira lost around R$20,000 (US$3,575.9) in pool game bets to Getúlio Rodrigues Frazão at the Bruno Snooker Bar, a drinking establishment in the Lisboa neighborhood of Sinop. Angered over the loss, the two left, returning shortly afterward in a white pickup truck and carrying a 12-gauge shotgun and a .380-caliber pistol. They ordered the people present at the scene to line up against a wall and shot them to death. Before leaving, the two shooters took the money they had lost in the game and a handbag belonging to one of the massacre's only two survivors, Raquel Gomes da Souza, mother of Larissa and wife of Getúlio.

Seven people were killed, including Frazão and his 12-year-old daughter. Six victims were pronounced dead at the scene, while a seventh died shortly after.

== Victims ==
The seven victims of the Sinop massacre (six men and a pre-teen girl) are:

- Maciel Bruno de Andrade Costa, 35 years old, owned the bar where the massacre took place, shot by Edgar's shotgun and executed with a shot to the head by Ezequias;
- Orisberto Pereira Sousa, 38 years old, Shot in the head by Edgar;
- Getúlio Rodrigues Frasão Júnior, 36 years old, Shot multiple times by Edgar;
- Elizeu Santos da Silva – 47 years old, was rescued alive but died in the hospital, shot in the back by Ezequias;
- Josué Ramos Tenório, 48 years old, shot at point blank range by Edgar;
- Adriano Balbinote, 46 years old, shot in the back while facing the wall;
- Larissa Frasao de Almeida, 12 years old, daughter of Getúlio Rodrigues Frasão Júnior, shot in the back by Edgar while trying to escape;

== Investigation ==
Police were called after the shooting and identified the perpetrators through security camera footage.

On February 22, a task force assembled to capture the perpetrators found the weapons and ammunition used in the shootings inside the truck driven by the perpetrators. The Military Police of the State of Mato Grosso said that the 12-gauge shotgun used in the massacre and a small black bag containing 14 rounds of Plastic tipped .40 caliber, 3 rounds of .380 ACP and 14 rounds of 12-gauge ammunition were found.

Police determined that both perpetrators had criminal records. Ribeiro had been convicted of carrying an illegal weapon, robbery, conspiracy, bodily harm, and for threats; he also had an active arrest warrant at the time of the shooting. Oliveira, who was a gun collector and sport shooter, had been arrested for domestic violence. The Mato Grosso Shooting Federation confirmed that Oliveira was a member of a gun club in Sinop, but was expelled from the group due to frequent absences.

== Aftermath ==
On February 22, Ribeiro was killed in a confrontation with the Military Police in a wooded area near the Presidente João Figueiredo Airport, 15 kilometres (9.3 mi) from Sinop. He was transported to a hospital, but died of his wounds. The following morning, Oliveira surrendered after a negotiation brokered by his lawyer. He was arrested in a house in the Jardim California neighborhood. As of February 24, Oliveira was in custody. In 2026, Oliveira was sentenced to over 136 years in prison.

== Reactions ==
Brazilian politicians condemned the attack. Flávio Dino, Minister of Justice and Public Security, blamed the shooting on an "irresponsible arms policy that led to the proliferation of shooting clubs, supposedly aimed at good people". National President of the Workers' Party Gleisi Hoffmann compared former president Jair Bolsonaro to a "guru of hate" and said that his pro-gun policies "stimulated intolerance and the arming of the population". New Party politician João Amoêdo stated that the attack was "an example of irresponsibility in defining public policies and encouraging a culture of hate by the former president".

Sergio Moro, a Bolsonaro ally, stated that "[the perpetrators] must be hunted down, arrested, convicted and abandoned in prison for the rest of their lives". Moro was criticized for this statement, as he had signed a 2019 decree that made citizens' access to firearms more flexible.
