= Vigário Geral =

- Neighborhood
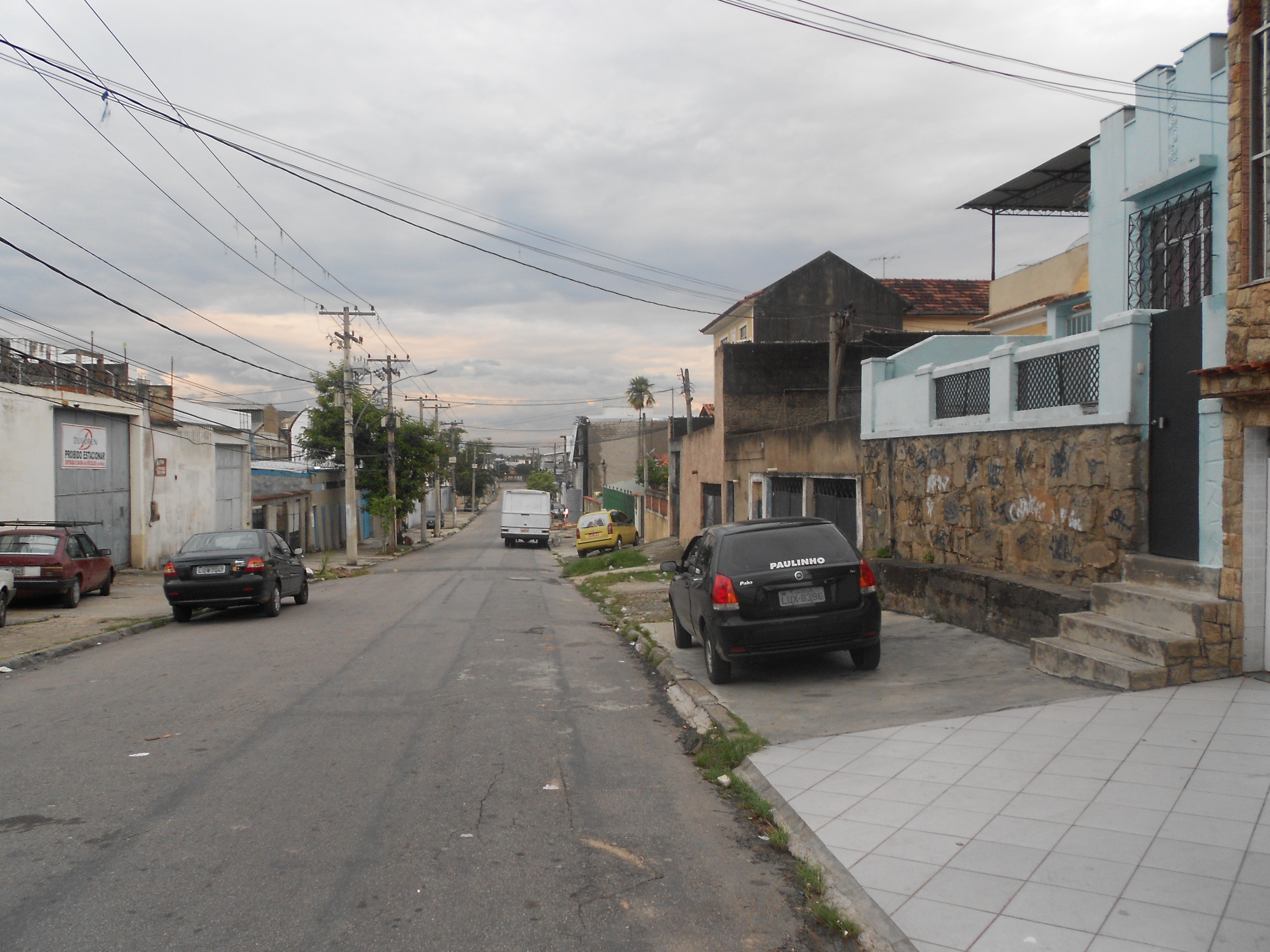

- Location in Rio de Janeiro Vigário Geral (Brazil)
- Coordinates: 22°48′27″S 43°18′37″W
- Country: Brazil
- State: Rio de Janeiro (RJ)
- Municipality/City: Rio de Janeiro
- Zone: North Zone

Vigário Geral is a neighborhood in the North Zone of Rio de Janeiro with a large favela.

It is infamous for the Vigário Geral massacre that occurred here in 1993.

== In popular culture ==
The movie Favela Rising follows the development of the Afro Reggae in this neighborhood, as well as focusing on life there.

== Lost Lives ==
Jussara, son of Aparecida Prazeres da Costa.

Shiela Caetano's husband, whom of which died to a AR-15 rifle, with only a .38-caliber revolver to defend himself with.
