= Complexo do Alemão massacre =

2007 police raid in Rio de Janeiro, Brazil

The Complexo do Alemão massacre was the result of an ongoing conflict between drug dealers and the police in the borough of the same name in Rio de Janeiro, which consisted of a group of large favelas in the northern region of the city. The massacre happened on June 27, 2007, when a large Military and Civil Police operation killed 19 people and injured several others. The Order of Attorneys of Brazil issued a report claiming that at least eleven of the people killed had no relations with drug trafficking whatsoever. Until the end of the XV Pan-American Games, a large siege was formed by the police in the region—to secure the safety of the event, some people claim. While it eventually got attached to the demotic sobriquet Gaza strip, a report published by the federal government revealed that there were executions at the operation.

== Victims ==
=== Killed ===
According to official records as of late-June 2007, at least 44 people were killed by the police in Complexo do Alemão since May 2, 2007. Nineteen people were killed by the police at the June 27, 2007 operation.

== Response ==
=== Federal government ===
The Special Secretariat for Human Rights, an office attached to the Office of the President of the Republic, issued a report claiming that there were executions at the operation, beside the fact that no exact number is given. Accordingly, the nineteen people killed received an average of 3.84 shots each. Fourteen were killed with a shot in the upper part of the body, six of them in the face.

=== Rio de Janeiro government ===
José Mariano Beltrame, the officer in charge of the Public Security Department in the state of Rio de Janeiro, responded to the federal government report by saying that "it was done in a hurry by those who misrepresent the fair cause of the human rights. This report reveal little about the facts, generating just a confusion". Also according to him, the federal government report is "disqualified" because the forensic doctors have not gone to Rio de Janeiro after the operation.

== See also ==
- List of massacres in Brazil
