= Parque Oeste massacre =

The Parque Oeste massacre was the killing of two landless farmers by military police on February 16, 2005, in the Goias state, Brazil. The farmers were part of a group of 3000–4000 families occupying abandoned land who were evicted by the military police.

== Background ==
At the beginning of 2005, around 3000–4000 families were occupying a "Sonho Real" (Real Dream) area in the Parque Oeste Industrial in Goiânia. During an election campaign, Governor Marconi Perillo of the Brazilian Social Democracy Party (PSDB) and Mayor Iris Rezende (PMDB) had promised publicly that the community would be able to stay and would never be evicted from the area. However, during February 6–15, the military police started a recovery action called "Operação Inquietação" (Operation Restlessness). They surrounded the area with vehicles, prevented people from entering and leaving, and cut off the electricity supply. With the sirens on, the sounds of gunfire and explosions, pepper spray and tear gas, the military police promoted terror among the residents and traumatized the children.

== The massacre ==
After this military action, on February 16, the military police began a siege called "Operação Triunfo" (Operation Triumph) when in 1 hour and 45 minutes about 14,000 people were forcibly evicted from their homes. During this struggle, two homeless men, Wagner da Silva Moreira (21) and Pedro Nascimento da Silva (24), were killed after being shot in the chest and stomach, respectively, forty were wounded (including one paraplegic, Marcelo Henrique) and 800 were arrested.

== Aftermath ==
Approximately 2,500 people spent the night in the Catedral de Goiânia, and then were housed in the Ginásios de Esportes in the Novo Horizonte and Capuava neighborhood for three months and in the Acampamento do Grajaú for more than three years. During this period, several people, mainly children and the elderly, died as a result of the poor living conditions, totaling more than 20 deaths until the delivery of the first houses in the Real Conquista; additionally, several people were reported missing, and there were suspected unidentified fatalities.

In 2014, after nine years of a judicial dispute over the federalisation of investigations, the "Parque Oeste Industrial case" was filed in the state court, which concluded that "there was no excess by the police" who acted in the eviction.
