= Compensa =

Neighborhood in Manaus, Amazonas, Brazil

Coordinates: 3°06′S 60°03′W

Compensa is a neighborhood in the western part of Manaus, Amazonas, Brazil. It is the largest district in the western section of the city and one of the largest neighborhoods in terms of population.
