= Felipe Curi =

Brazilian politician (born 1976)

- Curi in 2025

Member-elect of the Chamber of Deputies
- Assuming office 1 February 2027
- Constituency: Rio de Janeiro

Personal details
- Born: Felipe Lobato Curi; 8 August 1976 (age 50) Rio de Janeiro, Brazil
- Party: PP
- Profession: Police officer

Felipe Lobato Curi (born 8 August 1976) is a Brazilian politician who was elected member of the Chamber of Deputies in 2026. From 2024 to 2026, he served as secretary of the Civil Police of Rio de Janeiro State.
