= Quilombo da Serra dos Órgãos =

- Date: 1650 to 1699
- Location: Serra dos Órgãos, now Serra dos Órgãos National Park

The Quilombo da Serra dos Órgãos was a quilombo, or mocambo, located near the Guandu River and the Paraíba do Sul River (present-day city of Rio de Janeiro). The indigenous and black people who lived in this community carried out robberies and attacks on rural lands as a form of resistance to the owners of the farms from which these enslaved people had fled.

The period of resistance of this quilombo (maroon settlement) is documented in the year 1650, and they persisted until their massacre by the troops organized by the governor of the time, Artur de Sá e Meneses, in 1699.

== Context ==
The movements of the Quilombo da Serra dos Órgãos have their first recorded reports around 1650. Descriptions indicate violent attacks by the quilombo inhabitants on sugar, cassava, and other plantations in the city of Rio de Janeiro. They assaulted not only rural properties but also merchants in the region. This type of revolt was one of the ways in which Black and Indigenous people resisted capture by their masters.

Among the assaults, often armed, carried out by the quilombo inhabitants, were the deaths of sugar plantation owners, such as the case of a sugar master, the boatman João Alves Pereira, and the mixed-race man Valério Negrão, in Guaguassú (present-day Nova Iguaçu region) during 1650.

Although the ethnic character of quilombos is normally linked to enslaved blacks, in the case of the Quilombo da Serra dos Órgãos, enslaved Africans and indigenous people from the region were united, including the Tamoio, Timbira, and probably Maracajás. They were organized in various areas of the Serra dos Órgãos, on the banks of the Paraíba do Sul and Guandu rivers.

The attacks by these rebels sparked demands from farmers and other residents of Rio de Janeiro for reactions from local authorities. Measures were taken, such as by Governor Tomé Correia Alvarenga (1657-1659), who in 1659 increased the rewards for men willing to attack and destroy the runaway slave settlements in the Serra dos Órgãos. This was not enough for the landowning class; requests to combat the revolts were numerous.

In the same year, an expedition, commanded by Captain Manoel Jordão da Silva, a lieutenant and two sergeants, sought to capture the runaway slaves and destroy the Quilombo da Serra dos Órgão itself. This action was financed precisely by the sugar plantation owners of the region in order to prevent threats from the rebels against their own enslaved people. Although there are no reports on the development of this expedition, in 1669 , news reappears about looting and attacks in the region.

Captain Atanásio Pereira was appointed to control the quilombo region, but it had little effect, as the quilombo inhabitants continued their mobilizations.

== Outcome ==
Years later, in 1699, the same governor, Artur de Sá e Meneses, organized "Disciplined Corps," and through a military expedition carried out a massacre in the Quilombo da Serra dos Órgãos region. Due to the extreme violence, some members of the troop were arrested, accused of killing even those who offered no resistance. However, the reaction of other soldiers and residents of the city was one of dissatisfaction with the governor's decision.

Artur de Sá e Menezes even sent a letter to King Pedro II of Portugal on June 8, 1699, recounting the event, and received the Crown's approval.

The quilombos were a response to the harsh conditions imposed on enslaved people. Raids by troops and slave hunters could put an end to some communities, but as long as the slave system exploited them, the response would become increasingly violent.
