= Baixada Fluminense =

Region in the state of Rio de Janeiro, Brazil

Coordinates: 22°45′35″S 43°26′34″W

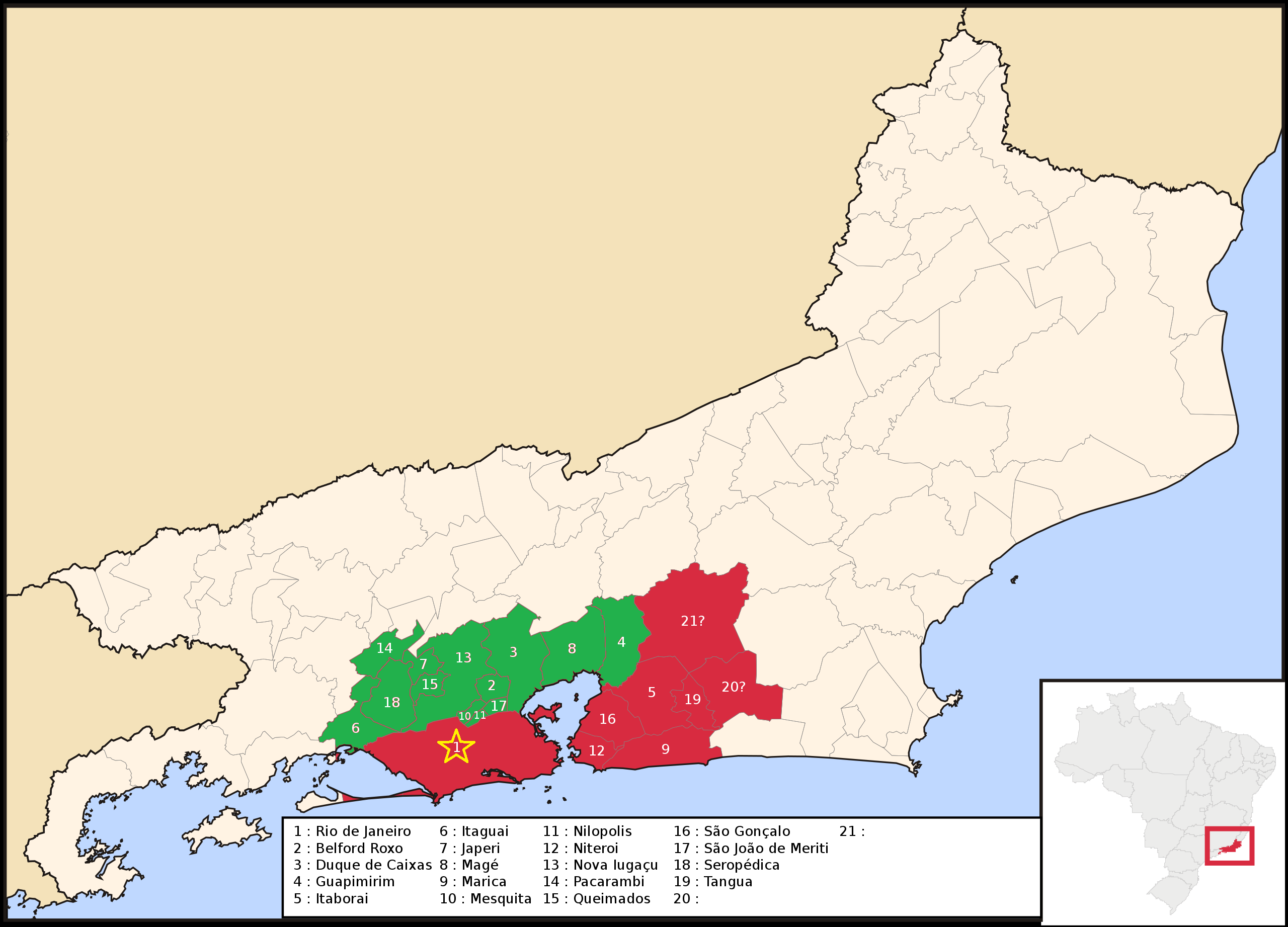
Map of the municipalities in Baixada Fluminense in green

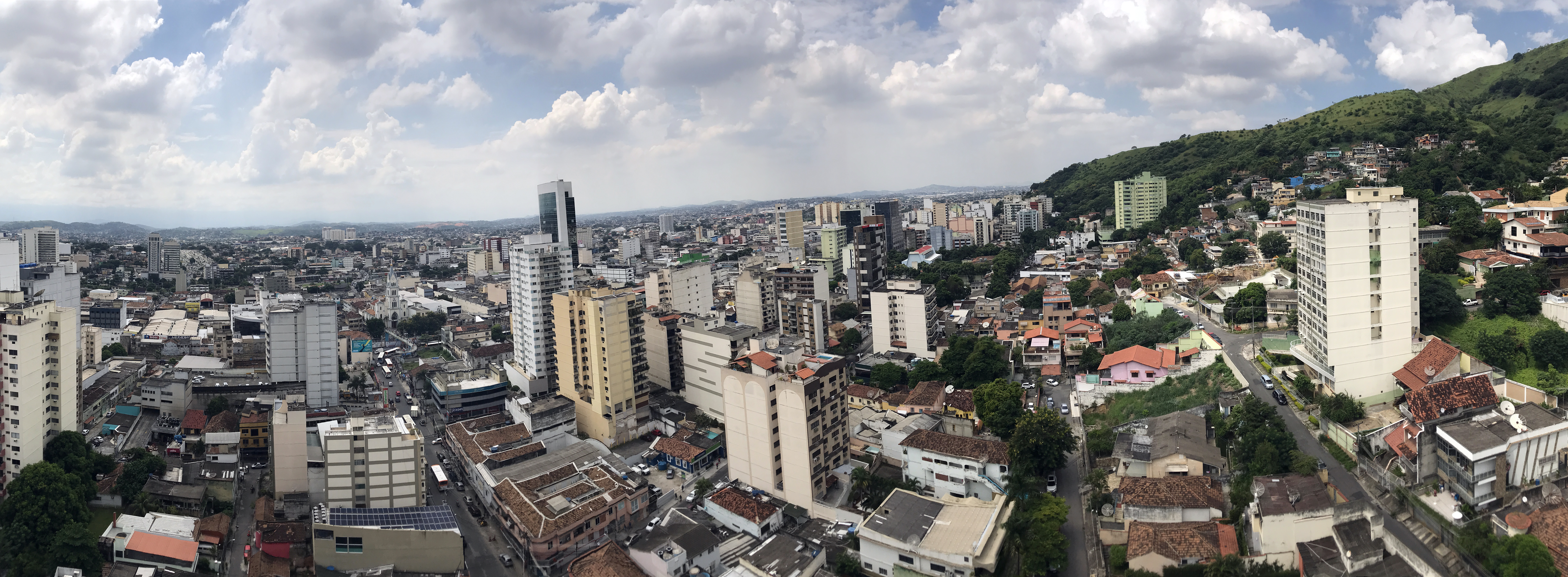
Partial view of Nova Iguaçu, the oldest city in Greater Iguaçu and one of the oldest in Baixada Fluminense

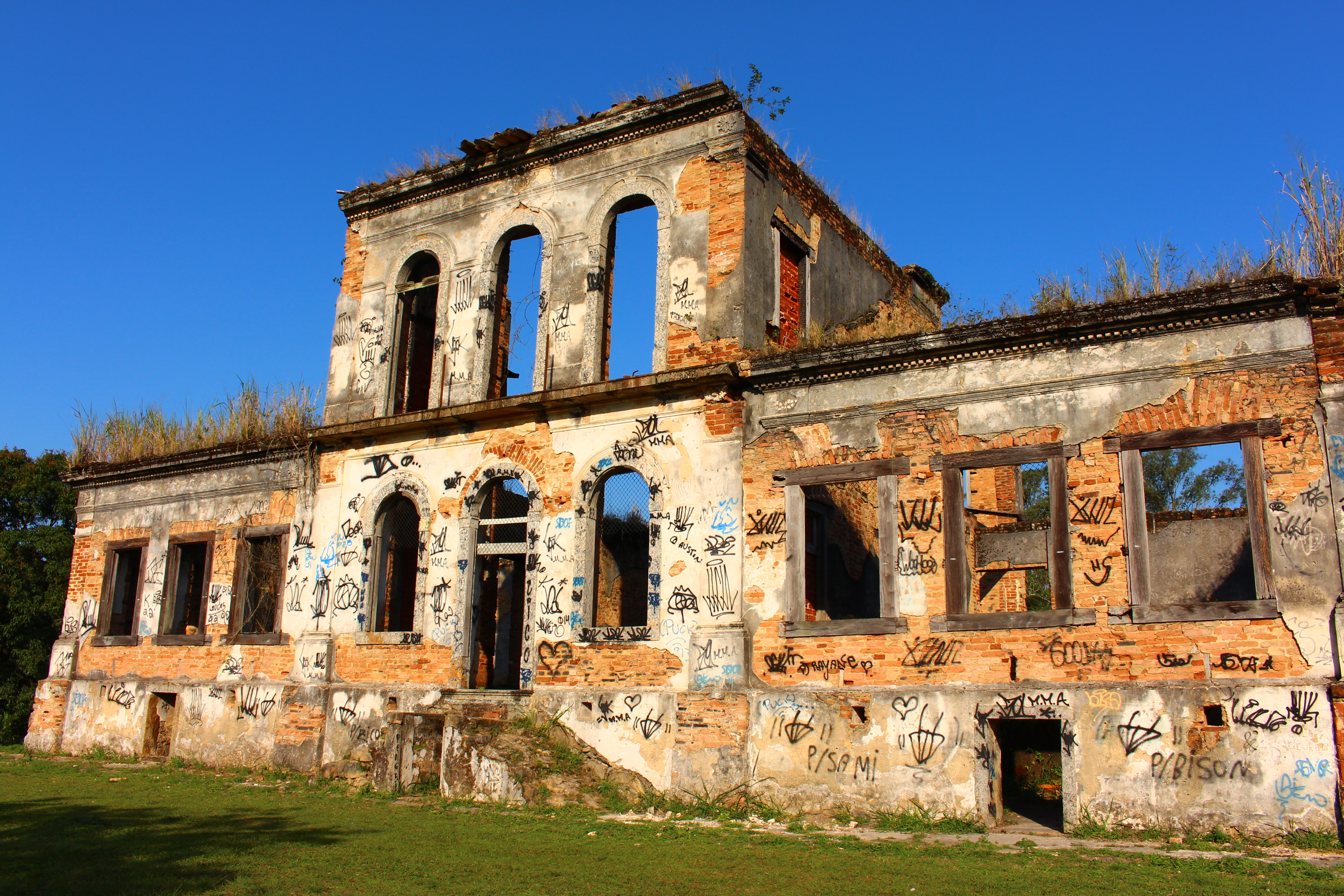
Ruins of the Fazenda São Bernardino, in Iguaçu Velho, the neighborhood where the former seat of the Vila de Iguassú (now the municipality of Nova Iguaçu) was located

The Baixada Fluminense (standard Portuguese pronunciation: [ˌbajˈʃadɐ flumiˈnẽjsi]; local pronounce: [ˌbɐ(j)ˈʃadɐ flumɪˈnẽ(j)si]) (literally "Fluminense Lowland") is a region in the Rio de Janeiro Metropolitan Region or Greater Rio (in the state of Rio de Janeiro), in southeastern Brazil. It is located on Guanabara Bay, between Rio de Janeiro to the south and the Serra dos Órgãos range of hills to the north.

It has an estimated population of 3,925,424, making it the second most populous region in the state, following only the city of Rio de Janeiro.

The expression "Baixada Fluminense" has two definitions: one in the stricto sensu sense (the predominant definition of the term in this article), and another in the lato sensu sense. In the strict sense, the expression refers to the political, economic, and social region discussed above, defined by its relationship with the rest of the metropolitan area of Rio de Janeiro, especially with the metropolitan core. In this sense, the term denotes the area of direct expansion of the Rio de Janeiro metropolis beyond the administrative limits of the core municipality. This definition of "Baixada Fluminense" is the most common today. Among the various delimitations of this region, the most comprehensive includes the municipalities of Guapimirim, Magé, Duque de Caxias, Nova Iguaçu, São João de Meriti, Nilópolis, Belford Roxo, Mesquita, Queimados, Japeri, Paracambi, Seropédica and Itaguaí (to which Mangaratiba is sometimes added, as this municipality is also part of the immediate urban expansion area of the Rio de Janeiro metropolis, along the Itaguaí axis).

In some official regional divisions of the state of Rio de Janeiro, certain municipalities considered part of the Baixada Fluminense in its broadest sense belong to other regions. For example, in the division of the state into tourist regions, Magé and Guapimirim are not included in the Baixada Fluminense but in the Serra Verde Imperial region; Itaguaí and Mangaratiba are in the Costa Verde region (Mangaratiba, specifically, has belonged since 2002—when it left the Metropolitan Region of Rio de Janeiro—to the Costa Verde government region in the state's political-administrative division—a region to which Itaguaí also belonged between 2002 and 2009—distinct from the Metropolitan Region); and Paracambi is in the Vale do Café region.

In a broader sense, the term refers to the physical geography of the state and denotes the entire plain region located between the Serra do Mar and the coast of Rio de Janeiro, from Mangaratiba to Campos dos Goytacazes. This region is further divided into four sectors: Baixada de Sepetiba, Baixada da Guanabara, Baixada de Araruama, and Baixada dos Goytacazes.

The expression "Baixada da Guanabara" is also sometimes used to refer to the Baixada Fluminense in its narrower sense—the portion of the metropolitan area of Rio de Janeiro formed by the 13 municipalities mentioned above—to distinguish this meaning of "Baixada Fluminense" from that referring to the region extending from the southern coast to the northern part of the state (Baixada Fluminense in the broad sense).

This region should not be confused with the Baixadas Litorâneas, located farther to the east in the same state.

== Geography ==
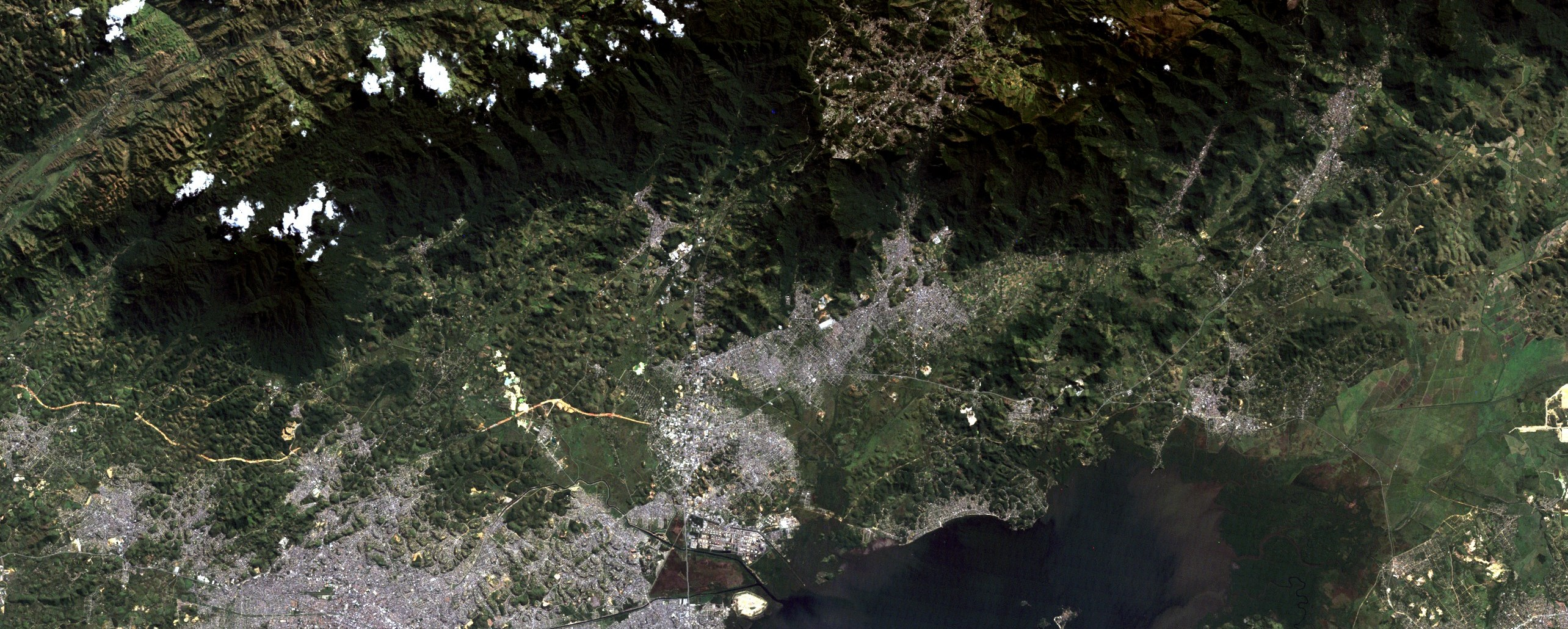
Satellite image of Baixada Fluminense (from Queimados to Guapimirim)

=== Physical geography ===
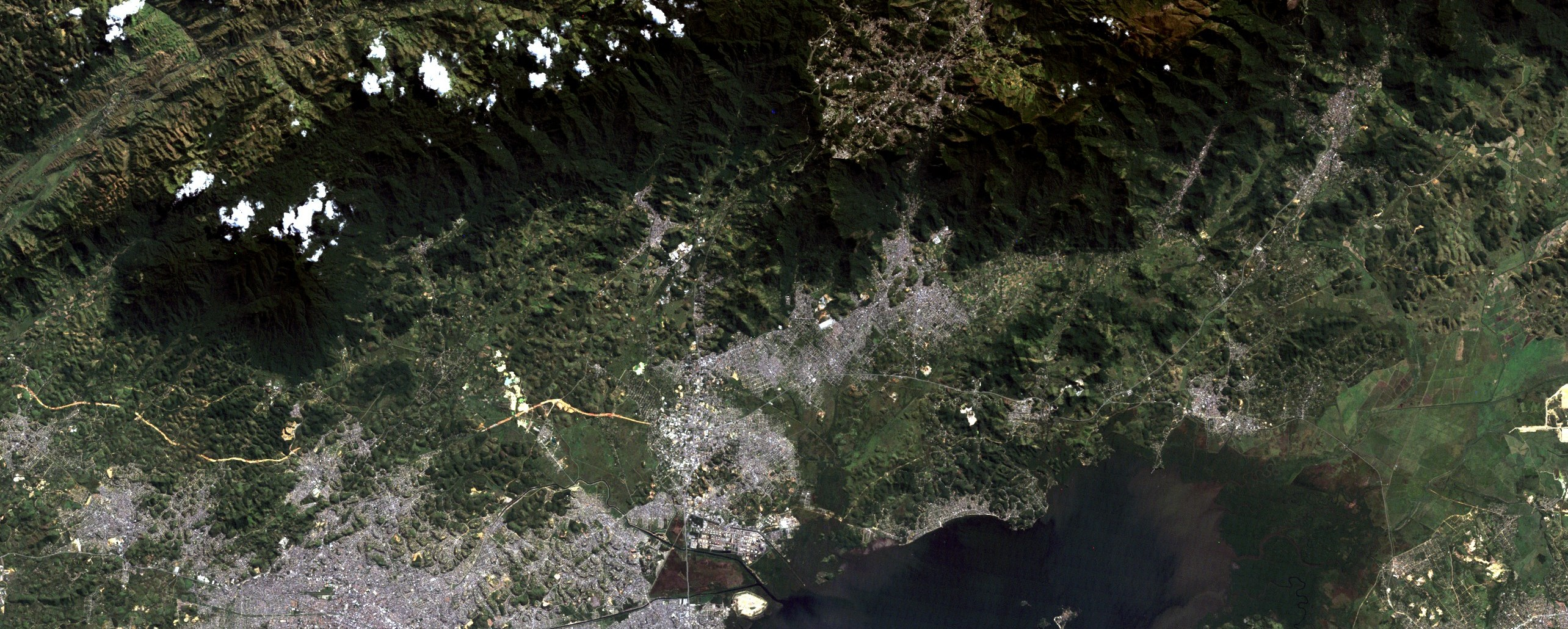
Satellite image of part of the Baixada Fluminense in the strict sense (from Queimados to Guapimirim)

The Baixada Fluminense, in the broad sense of the term, presents variable width: it is quite narrow in the initial stretch of the "Sepetiba Lowlands" (the section extending from the municipality of Mangaratiba to the Coroa Grande neighborhood, in Itaguaí, between the Serra do Mar and Sepetiba Bay), and gradually widens eastward until the Macacu River, in the "Guanabara Lowlands" region, which extends to the municipalities of Guapimirim and Cachoeiras de Macacu. In this stretch, within the municipality of Rio de Janeiro, between the West Zone (Sepetiba Lowlands), North Zone and South Zone (Guanabara Lowlands), rise the massifs of Pedra Branca Massif and Tijuca Massif, which reach altitudes slightly above one thousand meters. From Guanabara Bay to Cabo Frio, along the "Araruama Lowlands" sector, the Baixada Fluminense narrows again, presenting a succession of small elevations between 200 and 500 meters in height: the so-called "coastal massifs of Rio de Janeiro state". From the stretch between the district of Rocha Leão, in Rio das Ostras, and the neighborhood of Imboassica, in Macaé, the Baixada Fluminense widens once more in its final sector, the "Goytacazes Lowlands", reaching its greatest extent in the delta of the Paraíba do Sul River, in the region of Campos dos Goytacazes and São João da Barra, in northern Rio de Janeiro state.

=== Human geography ===
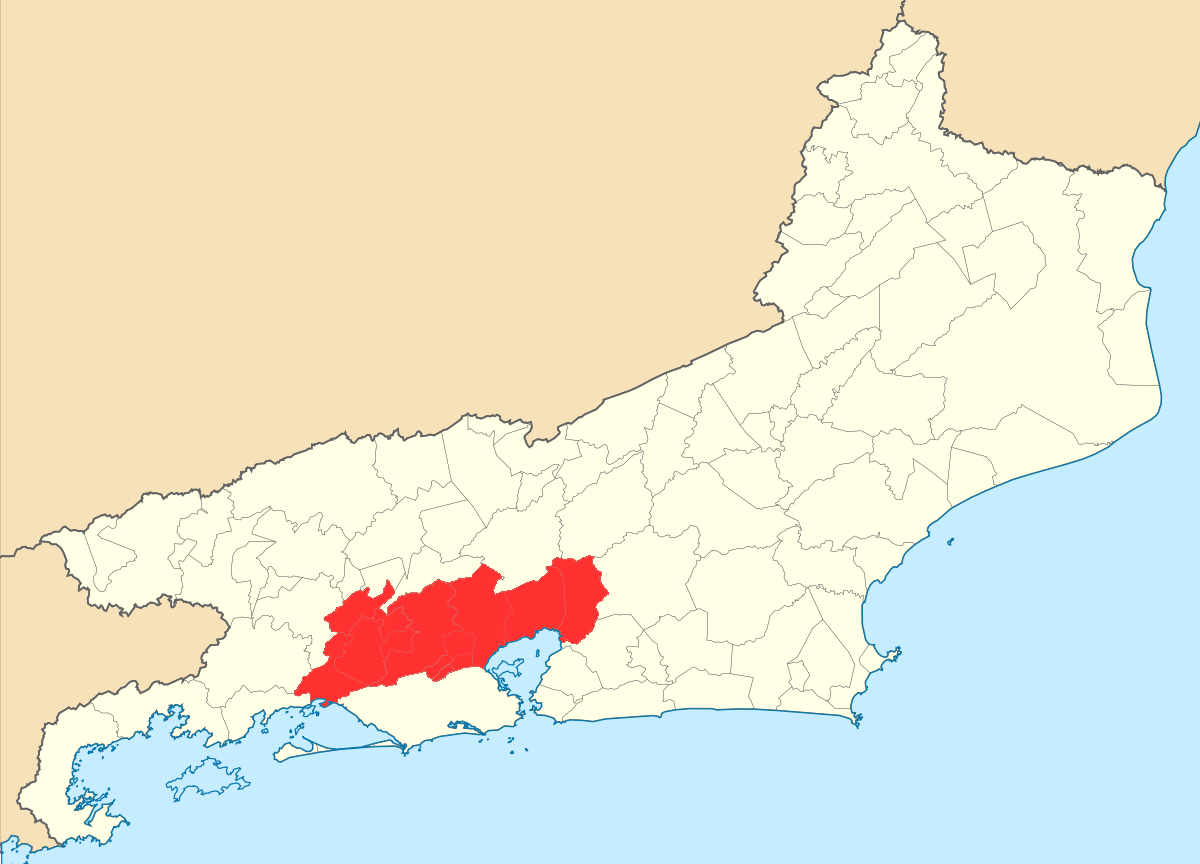
Location of the Baixada Fluminense (in the strict sense) in the state of Rio de Janeiro

The expression "Baixada Fluminense" mainly refers to the region through which the urban network of Rio de Janeiro (then the Federal District) expanded, largely along suburban railway lines. This region includes the municipalities that originated from the emancipation of districts of the former municipality of Nova Iguaçu, to which are generally added municipalities formed from the partition of the municipalities of Itaguaí and Magé, which are also located within the metropolitan expansion area. In this broader sense, the region encompasses the entire lowland area located between the present municipality of Rio de Janeiro and the Serra do Mar, from Itaguaí and Paracambi in the far western metropolitan area to Guapimirim in the inner Guanabara Bay region, bringing together municipalities with shared sociocultural characteristics and strongly integrated with each other and with the capital.

In a broad sense, the Baixada Fluminense is considered the central axis of the state of Rio de Janeiro, encompassing the state capital, part of the Costa Verde, the municipalities of the far western metropolitan area, all municipalities surrounding Guanabara Bay, the coastal lowlands (including the seven municipalities of the Lagos Region) and some municipalities of northern Rio de Janeiro state. It is crossed by some of the main highways of the state and of Brazil, such as the BR-101 (which runs through the Costa Verde, metropolitan region, coastal lowlands and northern Rio de Janeiro, thus crossing the entire Baixada Fluminense), the BR-040, the BR-116 and the RJ-106. It is also crossed, within the metropolitan area, by the railway lines Santa Cruz (entirely within the municipality of Rio de Janeiro), Japeri, Belford Roxo, Saracuruna, Paracambi (whose route reaches the tourist region of the Vale do Café), Vila Inhomirim and Guapimirim, all operated by the suburban rail concessionaire SuperVia; the region was also formerly served by the railway lines Niterói, Itaguaí, Mangaratiba and Campos (the latter being the only one of these lines that served an inland municipality of the state).

==== Divergences regarding its limits ====
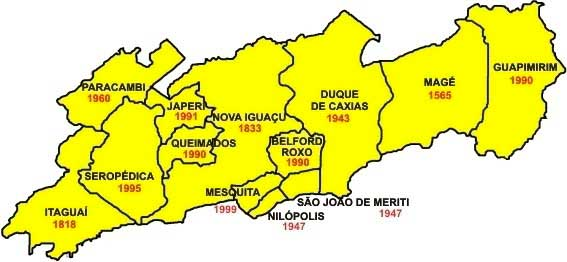
Map showing the municipalities of the Baixada Fluminense in its most comprehensive conception (however, without the inclusion of Mangaratiba), and the year of emancipation of each

Evolution of municipal boundaries through district emancipations in the Baixada Fluminense in its less comprehensive conception (Greater Iguaçu region) throughout the 20th century

Regarding the municipalities that belong to the Baixada Fluminense, there is consensus concerning Duque de Caxias, Nova Iguaçu, São João de Meriti, Nilópolis, Belford Roxo, Mesquita, Queimados (all north of the city of Rio de Janeiro) and Japeri, municipalities of Greater Iguaçu, where a large part of the consolidated periphery of the Rio de Janeiro metropolis is located. However, some authors consider, in addition to the eight municipalities mentioned, the municipalities of Guapimirim, Magé (to the east), Paracambi, Seropédica and Itaguaí, which originated from the partition of the former municipalities of Magé and Itaguaí during the 20th century and encompass a significant part of the expanding periphery of Greater Rio, as part of the region. In addition, the municipality of Mangaratiba is also sometimes considered part of the Baixada Fluminense in the strict sense (which refers to the area where the urban expansion of the Rio metropolis occurred), since the municipality is the first in the region in the broad sense (referring exclusively to the physical geography of the state); with these limits, the Baixada Fluminense in its most comprehensive conception becomes even more extensive, composed of 14 municipalities, beginning in Mangaratiba and ending in Guapimirim.

==== Comparison between the Baixada Fluminense and the East Metropolitan Region ====
Like the Baixada Fluminense, the East Metropolitan Region (East Fluminense or Greater Niterói), composed of the municipalities of Niterói, São Gonçalo, Itaboraí, Maricá, Tanguá, Rio Bonito and Cachoeiras de Macacu—the seven municipalities historically most integrated with each other and with Rio de Janeiro (especially with the Central Region) east of Guanabara Bay—, also grew as an expansion of the Rio de Janeiro metropolis, and both regions are part of the metropolitan area of the state capital.

However, these two regions differ considerably from one another, as they developed in quite distinct ways. The Baixada Fluminense grew as the immediate periphery of Rio de Janeiro, through the direct expansion of the city's urban footprint into the portion of the former state of Rio de Janeiro located north of the then Federal District—an area of lowlands situated between the territory corresponding to the present municipality of Rio de Janeiro and the Serra do Mar. The East Metropolitan Region, in turn, developed as an isolated periphery, physically separated from the city of Rio de Janeiro by Guanabara Bay. The urban area of Greater Niterói expanded from the center of the city of Niterói to the other municipalities in the region, although the metropolitan core—polarizing both Baixada Fluminense and Greater Niterói—is the center of the city of Rio.

Thus, the Baixada Fluminense and the East Metropolitan Region each have their own identity, and the municipalities composing each region share characteristics that clearly distinguish them. Due to their origin and development, the East Metropolitan Region has a certain degree of autonomy in relation to Rio (largely due to the role played by the city of Niterói), whereas the Baixada is highly dependent on the capital. Municipalities in the East Metropolitan Region tend to interact more with each other than those in the Baixada, while municipalities in the Baixada generally maintain a stronger connection with the center of the capital than those in the East Metropolitan Region. This can be observed in commuting patterns within the metropolitan area and in the destinations of urban public transport lines available in these two regions. Internal connections between the seven municipalities of Greater Niterói are made via intermunicipal bus and van lines. Transport between these municipalities and the city of Rio de Janeiro is carried out directly (departing from each of the seven municipalities) by road transport (buses and vans), and from Niterói by ferries. In the Baixada Fluminense, the main means of transport is the suburban train; railway branches connect almost all municipalities in the region to Central do Brasil, in the capital's center. Intermunicipal bus lines (departing from the thirteen municipalities of the Baixada Fluminense) and vans also connect the Baixada to the Central Region of Rio. As for circulation within the Baixada Fluminense, although there are bus lines connecting all municipalities to each other, there are no intermunicipal vans operating these same routes.

Both the Baixada Fluminense and the East Metropolitan Region are strongly linked to the metropolitan core (the Central Region of the capital), and the municipalities within each region maintain strong interaction among themselves—thus being highly integrated into the metropolis—however, the Baixada and the East Metropolitan Region do not have significant direct connections with each other.

== History ==
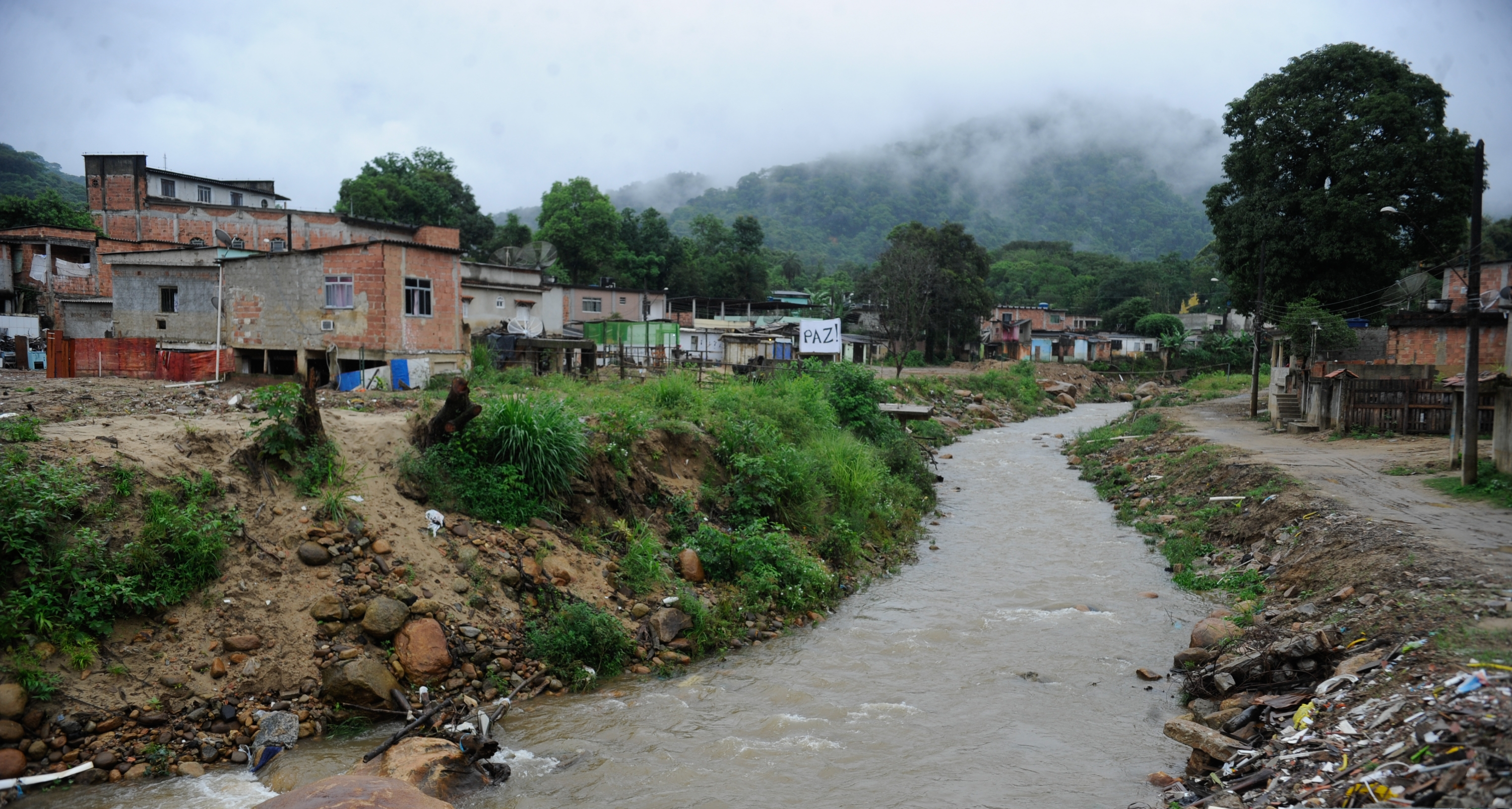
Capivari River, which runs through the municipality of Duque de Caxias

Pre-conquest

Around the year 1000, the region was invaded by Tupi peoples from the Amazon rainforest, who expelled the earlier inhabitants—speakers of languages of the Macro-Jê linguistic stock—into the interior of the continent, where they would form the so-called Indians Puris. In the 16th century, the first Europeans arrived in the region. They encountered the Tupi group known as the Tupinambá (also called Tamoios).

16th century

The region played a fundamental historical role in the formation of the present-day state of Rio de Janeiro, from the time of the arrival of Portuguese expeditions led by Amerigo Vespucci in Arraial do Cabo in 1503 (the first to reach the current state territory) and that of Estácio de Sá in Rio de Janeiro. The region came to be occupied by the French in the 16th century, forming an area of Brazilwood exploitation from the region of the present-day city of Rio de Janeiro to Cabo Frio. This city was essential for the founding and consolidation of the city of Rio de Janeiro, as it was the first point of arrival for European invaders on the coast of the present-day state: as soon as privateer ships were sighted, cannon shots were fired in Cabo Frio and, when the sound reached Rio de Janeiro, the city was warned that invaders were approaching. With the victory of the Portuguese and their Temiminó allies over the Tupinambá and their French allies, the Baixada Fluminense was divided by the Portuguese into sesmarias, where sugarcane was cultivated and sugar was produced using labor from enslaved people.

18th century

Until the 19th century, the region was known as the Baixada da Guanabara. It experienced some development during the 18th century, when it was an important corridor for transporting gold mined in the neighboring state of Minas Gerais.

19th century

In the 19th century was one of the first regions to develop coffee plantations. Another major economic boost occurred with the construction of railways in the region, such as the Mauá Railway (the first railway in Brazil) in Magé and the Dom Pedro II Railway (now the Central do Brasil Railway), during the Second Reign (1840–1889). This reduced the importance of traditional river routes and pathways in the region, but led to the emergence of new towns and settlements around railway stations, such as Maxambomba (now Nova Iguaçu), Belém (now Japeri), among others, which today form the main cities of the region. At the time, citrus cultivation in the region also experienced significant growth. However, during the reign of Emperor Pedro II the region suffered serious economic decline due to the creation of railroads, which led to a sharp decline in the traffic on the region's rivers and roads.

20th century

In the early 20th century the area began to receive drainage works to reduce serious public health problems, notably outbreaks of malaria that afflicted the region. The area also experienced a large influx of people arriving from other parts of the country, mainly from Espírito Santo, Minas Gerais and Northeastern Brazil, There was also immigration from other countries, most of them came from Portugal. This people came in search of better living conditions in the then federal capital, the city of Rio de Janeiro, as well as This movement, however, occurred in a less official and more "natural" way than might be imagined. People were attracted by the large number of vacant lands and the ease of transportation provided by the railways (such as the EFCB with its branches and the Rio d'Ouro line) Such migratory movements, however, have been a constant in the region's history, whether due to the movement of muleteers along the roads that connected Rio and the lowlands to the mountain regions before the inauguration of the railway line, or in the post-abolition period, when a large number of former enslaved people and/or their descendants used the same railway line toward Rio in search of better opportunities. Many of these migrants ended up settling in the Baixada or in the North Zone of Rio de Janeiro.

In the second half of the 20th century, the region acquired a reputation for poverty, crime and inadequate social services. However, this was the case in all its places; even though there are favelas in the region and a problem with violence, there are great neighborhoods in all the cities in the region, most of its inhabitants don't live in a favela, and probably haven't even visited one.

Large marsh drainage projects were undertaken to improve sanitary conditions, Successful even in most cities.

21st century

There has been a reasonable increase in the region's human development index.

In 2005, 29 people were killed in a mass shooting led by military police force.

== Economy ==
The Baixada Fluminense region, especially Duque de Caxias and Nova Iguaçu, concentrates large industries, notably in the petrochemical (ARLANXEO), energy, and logistics and wholesale sectors, housing companies such as Shell, Petrobras, White Martins, Sadia, Volkswagen Trucks, Bayer, Coca-Cola, and Niely, in addition to strong distribution and commercial hubs, with the presence of large shopping and logistics centers driving the region's economic growth.

== Culture ==
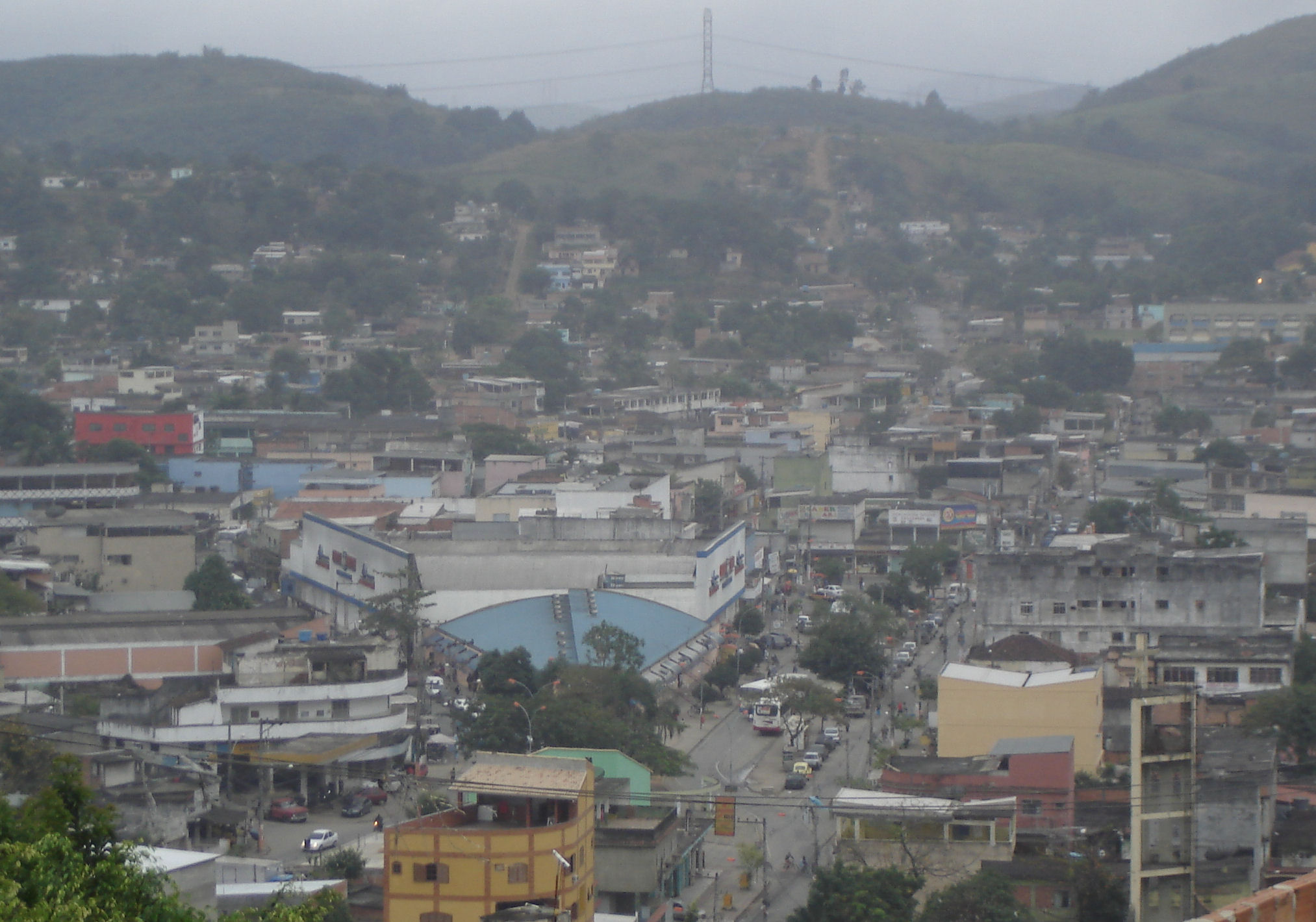
Miguel Couto, one of the main neighborhoods of the municipality of Nova Iguaçu

The Baixada Fluminense is culturally diverse. The influx of migrants—whether freed slaves from the Sul Fluminense or those coming from the Northeast Region of Brazil—favored the preservation and renewal of various festivals and celebrations, such as the Folia de Reis and even the jongo, although the latter is not common in the Rio de Janeiro metropolitan area today, with the exception of the jongo group from Serrinha, in Madureira.

Afro-Brazilian religions are also present and active in the region. Numerous Candomblé terreiros were founded between the 1970s and 1980s, making the region one of the most active and dynamic religious centers of these traditions. Important Ialorixás, such as Mãe Beata de Iemanjá, have terreiros in the region, especially in Nova Iguaçu, as well as Mejitó Marcia de Sàkpáta in São João de Meriti and Mãe Meninazinha d'Oxum in Belford Roxo.

== Education ==
The Baixada Fluminense region offers diverse options for technical and higher education, notably federal institutions such as IFRJ and CEFET (with campuses in Duque de Caxias, Nilópolis, Nova Iguaçu, and Itaguaí, And the Federal Rural University of Rio de Janeiro In Seropédica, And hundreds of schools at the preschool, secondary, and high school levels.
