= Vila Cruzeiro shootout =

Police Operation in Rio De Janeiro

2022 Rio de Janeiro shootout
- Part of Brazilian drug war
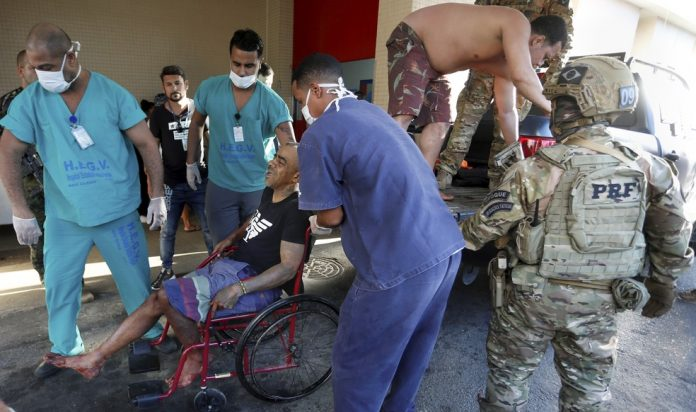
- A civilian injured after the raid
Date	24 May 2022
Location	Vila Cruzeiro, part of the Penha complex, in Rio de Janeiro

Belligerents
Special Police Operations Battalion; Federal Police; Federal Highway Police	Comando Vermelho

Casualties and losses
At least one police officer wounded	15 killed (according to police) 16 vehicles and 13 automatic rifles taken
- 23–25 deaths in total At least one bystander killed

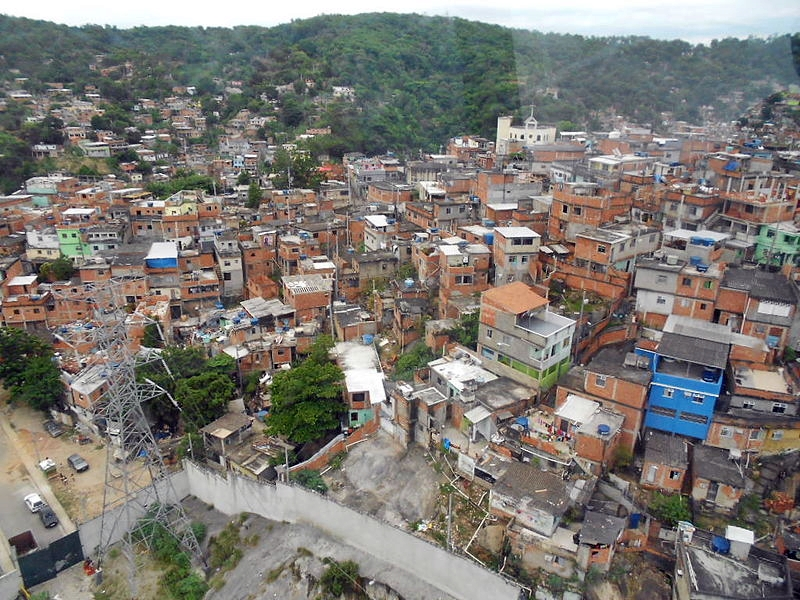

The Vila Cruzeiro shootout (Portuguese: chacina da Vila Cruzeiro) took place on 24 May 2022 in the favela of the same name in Rio de Janeiro, during a joint operation by the Special Police Operations Battalion (BOPE), the Federal Police and the Federal Highway Police that resulted in at least 26 people killed by gunshots or cutting objects. It was the second most lethal police operation in the city of Rio de Janeiro, second only to the Chacina do Jacarezinho, which occurred a year earlier.

According to BOPE, the operation aimed to arrest more than 50 traffickers from the Comando Vermelho from various states who were heading to Rocinha favela. The undercover police team was discovered around 4pm and the MP carried out an emergency operation involving 80 officers and 26 members of the Federal Highway Police. The shootout dragged on for hours until it reached the woods of Serra da Misericórdia, which connects Vila Cruzeiro to Complexo do Alemão, where most of the victims were shot. Officials seized 13 rifles, 12 grenades, 4 pistols, 10 cars and 20 motorbikes. The victims were transferred to Hospital Estadual Getúlio Vargas. The Military Police state that the faction is very active, responsible for 80% of the confrontations in Rio. Besides Rio de Janeiro, the victims also came from other states, such as Alagoas, Bahia, Ceará, Rio Grande do Norte, Amazonas and Pará.

The operation took place during the term of Governor Cláudio Castro. In just one year, 39 massacres occurred in the state, leaving 182 dead. Only in the region where the operation took place, four massacres occurred in one year, leaving 42 dead.

== Dead and injured ==
The death toll reached 26. However, later the Medico-Legal Institute reported that three of the dead actually came from another confrontation, on Juramento Hill. The number of dead is therefore 23. Of those, 11 were not answering criminal charges.

Civil police officer Sérgio Silva do Rosário was the only injured officer, as he was hit by shrapnel while carrying out an inspection. Five other people were injured and taken to hospitals in the city. Among them are Edson Ferreira da Costa and Ryan de Almeida, who were admitted respectively to the Emergency Care Unit of the Complexo de Gericinó and the Hospital Municipal Salgado Filho. Still, a social activist recorded part of the action, and BOPE fired once in his direction. He identified himself to Uol, which opted to hide his identity to protect him from reprisals.

A woman was killed by a stray bullet in the community of Chatuba, neighbouring Vila Cruzeiro. Gabrielle Ferreira da Cunha was 41 years old and was shot in her home.

Apart from her, at least 25 people are dead, all being considered by the police as suspects. Residents report that one of the victims was stabbed to death by the police. The Human Rights Commission of the OAB-RJ backs up this version, saying that one of the bodies did indeed present perforations. The body was found with its face covered with white powder. Residents report that the police forced him to eat cocaine before murdering him. Another victim, Natan Werneck, even called for help by telephone and was rescued only 6 hours after the event, but died in hospital.

=== Call for a cease-fire ===
During the action, 22 entities signed a letter addressed to the government of Rio de Janeiro, the state Public Ministry, the Military Police Secretariat, the Federal Police and the Federal Highway Police Superintendence asking for an immediate ceasefire for the removal of the bodies. According to the letter, the security forces were preventing the removal of the bodies and threatening human rights activists.

== Reactions ==
=== Pre-candidates for the Rio de Janeiro state government ===
Governor Cláudio Castro (PL) supported the "operation" in the community. However, he was accused of wanting the extermination of the favela and of making political use of the event, aiming at re-election.

Marcelo Freixo (pre-candidate for PSB), claimed that "killing is not security. " He reminded that it is possible to fight crime without lethality and in an efficient way. He also stated that it is necessary to "end the political use of the police".

It's time to stop the political use of the police. It is time to treat Public Security as a serious matter, not as an electoral weapon.

Rodrigo Neves (PDT) said that "spectacular actions and without strategy, like this one today, have produced killing and put at risk the poor population of the favelas and the police officers themselves".

Felipe Santa Cruz (PSD) lamented what happened: "another tragic military police operation in Vila Cruzeiro. Security policy cannot be a policy of death".

=== Rio de Janeiro State Federation of Favelas ===
The Rio de Janeiro State Federation of Favelas (FAFERJ) - which calls the episode the "slaughter of the Penha complex" - said that the massacre had a political purpose:

An electioneering massacre with justifications that changed throughout the day, as the number of deaths rose, schools, hospitals and public agencies closed in the region. A real-life horror film to inflame conservative voters and citizens against Rio's favelas

— FAFERJ

=== Ordem dos Advogados do Brasil ===
According to the OAB, the police action has evidence of torture, and that "the slaughters have become public policy to favour the desires of the middle class." They also bring that Governor Claudio Castro's approval rating jumped from 14% to 40% after the slaughter.

=== Brazilian government ===
President Jair Bolsonaro praised Bope for the operation, saying that the criminal faction started the shooting and that it was responsible for the deaths of 13 public security agents in 2022. He also lamented for Gabrielle's death.

Congratulations to the warriors of BOPE and the Military Police of Rio de Janeiro, who neutralised at least 20 criminals linked to drug trafficking in a confrontation, after being attacked by gunfire during an operation against criminal faction leaders.

=== Supreme Federal Court ===
The president of the STF Luiz Fux said that the Military Police owes satisfaction for the operation.

STF Minister Edson Fachin said in a statement that he was very concerned about the operation. He also said he is confident that the STF decision will be upheld and that a full investigation will be carried out.

=== Security forces ===
The Fluminense Military Police argues that the migration of traffickers to Rio de Janeiro was due to the restrictions made by the STF, approved by Edson Fachin on the occasion of the COVID-19 pandemic.

The Federal Highway Police said in an official statement that in Pará alone there have been ten attempts on the lives of public officials in recent weeks, and it will support other security forces whenever necessary.

=== Others ===
Congressman Eduardo Bolsonaro praised the action, saying that if the police do not act in the area, trafficking can profit and arm itself freely.

Fabrício Queiroz, Flávio Bolsonaro's former adviser and PTB affiliate, said the slaughter will result in fewer votes for the left.

== Investigation ==
On the same day of the massacre, the Public Ministry of Rio de Janeiro opened proceedings to investigate the police action, giving ten days for all involved to be heard and for BOPE to indicate those responsible for the deaths. The Federal Public Prosecutor's Office has also opened an investigation to look into the actions of individual police officers.

The PSB and human rights organizations filed a request with the Supreme Court for the Rio de Janeiro government to draw up another plan to reduce police lethality in operations. The request was forwarded to Minister Edson Fachin. In February, the STF had already forced Governor Cláudio Castro to explain what he would do about the situation of violence in Rio, but received a response with generic intentions.
