= 2010 Rio de Janeiro security crisis =

Major security crisis in Brazil

2010 Rio de Janeiro Security Crisis
- Part of Armed conflict for control of the favelas in Greater Rio de Janeiro
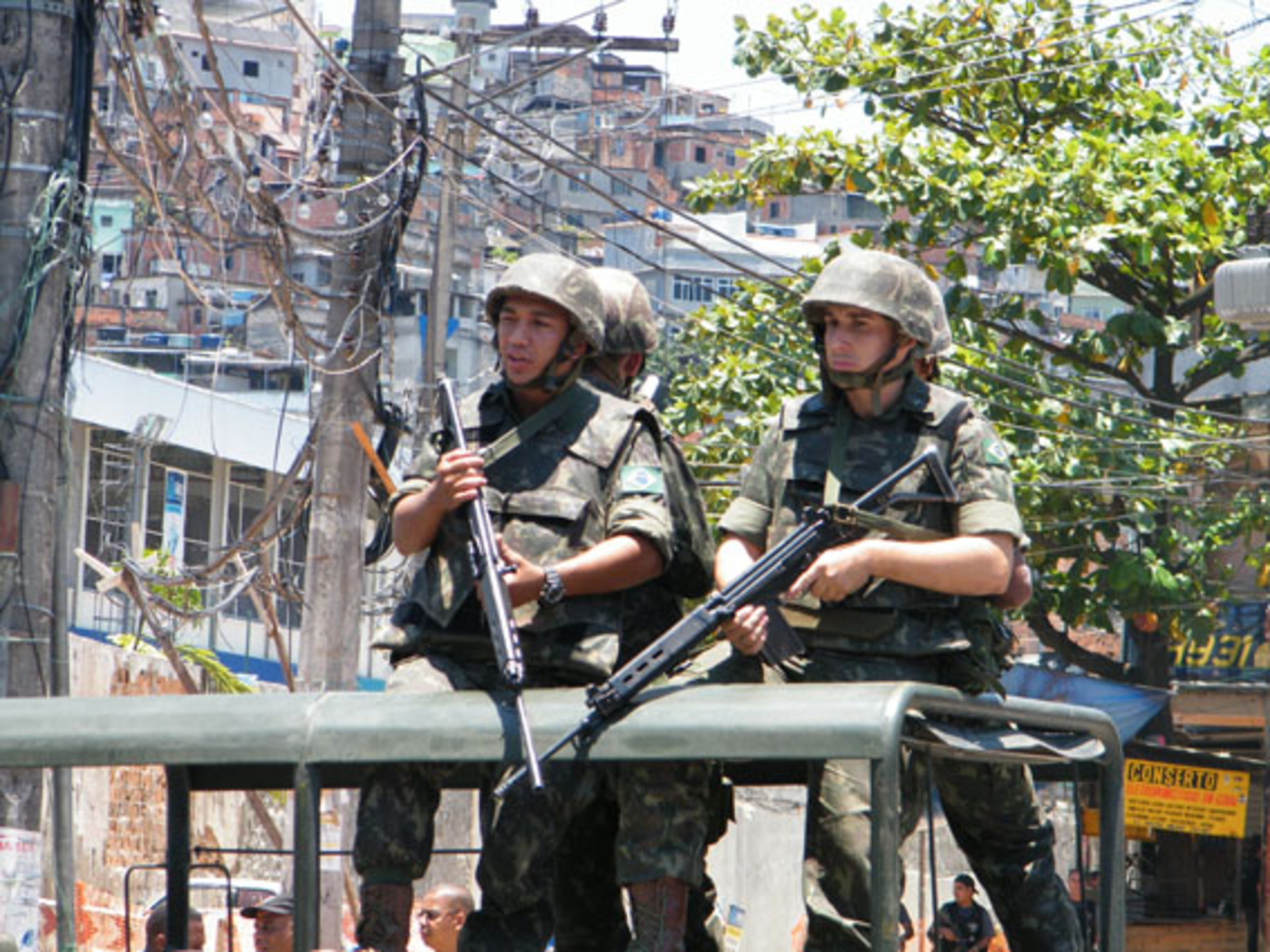
- Brazilian soldiers holding FN FALs in a favela.
Date	21–28 November 2010
Location	Rio de Janeiro, Brazil
Result	Occupation of Vila Cruzeiro and Complexo do Alemão by the government forces, security restored in the city.

Belligerents
Brazil; Brazilian Armed Forces; Brazilian Army; Brazilian Navy; Brazilian Marine Corps; Brazilian Air Force; Brazilian Intelligence Agency; Ministry of Justice; Brazilian Federal Police; Brazilian Federal Highway Police; Rio de Janeiro; Rio de Janeiro State Military Police; BOPE; Rio de Janeiro State Civil Police; CORE	Gangs: Comando Vermelho

Commanders and leaders
(Brazil) Luiz Inácio Lula da Silva (Brazil) Nelson Jobim; Sérgio Cabral Filho; José Mariano Beltrame (Brazil) General Sardenberg; Colonel Duarte	Luciano Martiniano da Silva (Pezão) and Fabiano Atanásio da Silva (FB)

Strength
21,000 men of Military Police and Civil Police: BOPE; CORE; 12 Police armored vehicles (caveirões); 500 soldiers Brazilian Marines; 6 M-113; 6 Mowag Piranha III; 5 AAV7A1; 800 Paratroopers from Brazilian Army 2 EE-9 Cascavel; 6 EE-11 Urutu; 9 Helicopters	400-600 men in Complexo do Alemão and Vila Cruzeiro thousands of Comando Vermelho men in other favelas

Casualties and losses
4 wounded	39 killed 200 arrested
- 2 civilians killed

In November 2010, there was a major security crisis in the Brazilian city of Rio de Janeiro and some of its neighboring cities. The city's criminal drug trafficking factions initiated a series of attacks in response to the government placing permanent police forces into Rio's slums.

In response to the attacks, the local police forces with the aid of the Brazilian Army and Marine Corps initiated a large scale offensive against two of the largest drug trafficking headquarters in the city, located in the Vila Cruzeiro and the neighboring Complexo do Alemão. The operation was considered a success by the government and local media, and a large quantity of illegal drugs, weapons, and money were confiscated.

== Overview ==
Violent acts by drug dealers consisted of incinerating cars, buses and trucks on the streets (over 181 motor vehicles were incinerated), and armed conflicts between the police and the drug dealers at different places of those cities. Being an elevated emergency situation, the local police, along with the BOPE, the Brazilian Army, and the Brazilian Marine Corps were summoned to restore peace in the city and counter-attack the drug traffickers by taking control of their headquarters in the favelas, located at the group of slums named Complexo do Alemão, which was finally taken by the police around 10:00 am of November 28.

By the end of the favela violence, over 40 people (almost all of them criminals) had been killed in the conflict and over 200 people arrested. Though the attacks ended, the police and military forces still occupy the Complexo do Alemão, the largest favela in the city of Rio de Janeiro.

== Timeline of the crisis ==
November 21
In the afternoon, six heavily armed individuals incinerated two cars at Linha Vermelha, one of Rio's most important highways. Since then similar attacks started occurring throughout the city and another group of criminals opened fire against a Brazilian Air Force Vehicle.
November 22
A police captain was shot at Dom Helder Camara Avenue. In addition to the attacks on cars, mass robberies happen in some streets. The government implies that "a small criminal faction" is responsible for the attacks and patrolling is increased. Three people were killed.
November 23
A large scale operation from Rio's Military police invaded several slums of the city in search of those responsible for the series of attacks. Some sources indicate that the order for the attacks came from drug lords imprisoned in the Catanduvas Federal Maximum Security Prison. Three people died and five were arrested.
November 24
The attacks on civilian and police targets intensify. The government declares an order calling all able members of the police force to reinforce patrols including those on license and performing administrative duties. Eight criminals imprisoned in the city responsible for taking part in the crisis are transferred to the Catanduvas Prison. Fifteen suspects were killed and at least thirty were arrested. The local government asked for the Brazilian Marine Corps' support to launch a counter offensive on the criminals.
November 25
The Rio's Special Task Forces (BOPE) invades one of the city's most dangerous areas at the Vila Cruzeiro with the aid of several Marine Corps' armored vehicles. Dozens of criminals desperately fled to their nearby headquarters at the Complexo do Alemão. Details of the operation, including the criminals' run, are broadcast by the local TV stations to the whole world.
November 26
The Brazilian government sent hundreds of soldiers from the Army and members of the Federal Police Force to further increase security in the city and put the Complexo do Alemão under siege. So far more than 100 vehicles were destroyed and around 40 people killed since the start of the crisis. The President Luiz Inácio Lula da Silva declares that the Federal Government fully supports Rio's government to end the situation as soon as possible. Spouses and lawyers of some of the imprisoned leaders of the criminal factions are arrested on suspicion of relaying their orders to start the attacks to their cohorts out of prison.
November 27
The Joint task force composed of members of the local police, Army and Marine Corps gives an ultimatum to the criminals at the Complexo do Alemão to surrender while residents evacuate the premises in spite of the impending invasion. The wave of attacks on civilian targets start to fade.
November 28
The Complexo do Alemão is taken over by the police with little resistance, but only a few criminals supposed to be hiding in the place are arrested. Further investigations point that the majority managed to escape through rough terrains around the Complex or through a network of illegal water canals built under the favelas.

=== Aftermath ===
Just after the occupation of the Complexo do Alemão and Vila Cruzeiro by the Army, the attacks on vehicles stopped and crisis came to an end. The police managed to apprehend around 40 tonnes of marijuana and 250 kilos of cocaine along with many other illicit drugs, dozens of weapons including pistols, assault rifles, explosives, machine guns, hundreds of stolen motorcycles and more than 30 stolen cars. The drugs were destroyed while the police were charged with the task of returning the stolen vehicles to their rightful owners. The losses suffered by the criminals are stated to surpass 200 million reais (around 120 million US dollars), not including the confiscated houses belonged to the faction's main leaders, fully equipped with many luxury items including multiple pools, jacuzzis and high level electronic hardware.

Through a deal between the State government and the Federal government, the troops remained stationed in the occupied area until a permanent police force was installed to maintain security. Despite the fact that most of the criminals managed to escape, the operation was considered by the local media as a major victory against crime in Rio de Janeiro and a turning point in the war against drug trafficking in Brazil.

== See also ==
- 2006 São Paulo violence outbreak
