= Northrop Grumman Firebird =

Intelligence gathering aircraft

Firebird
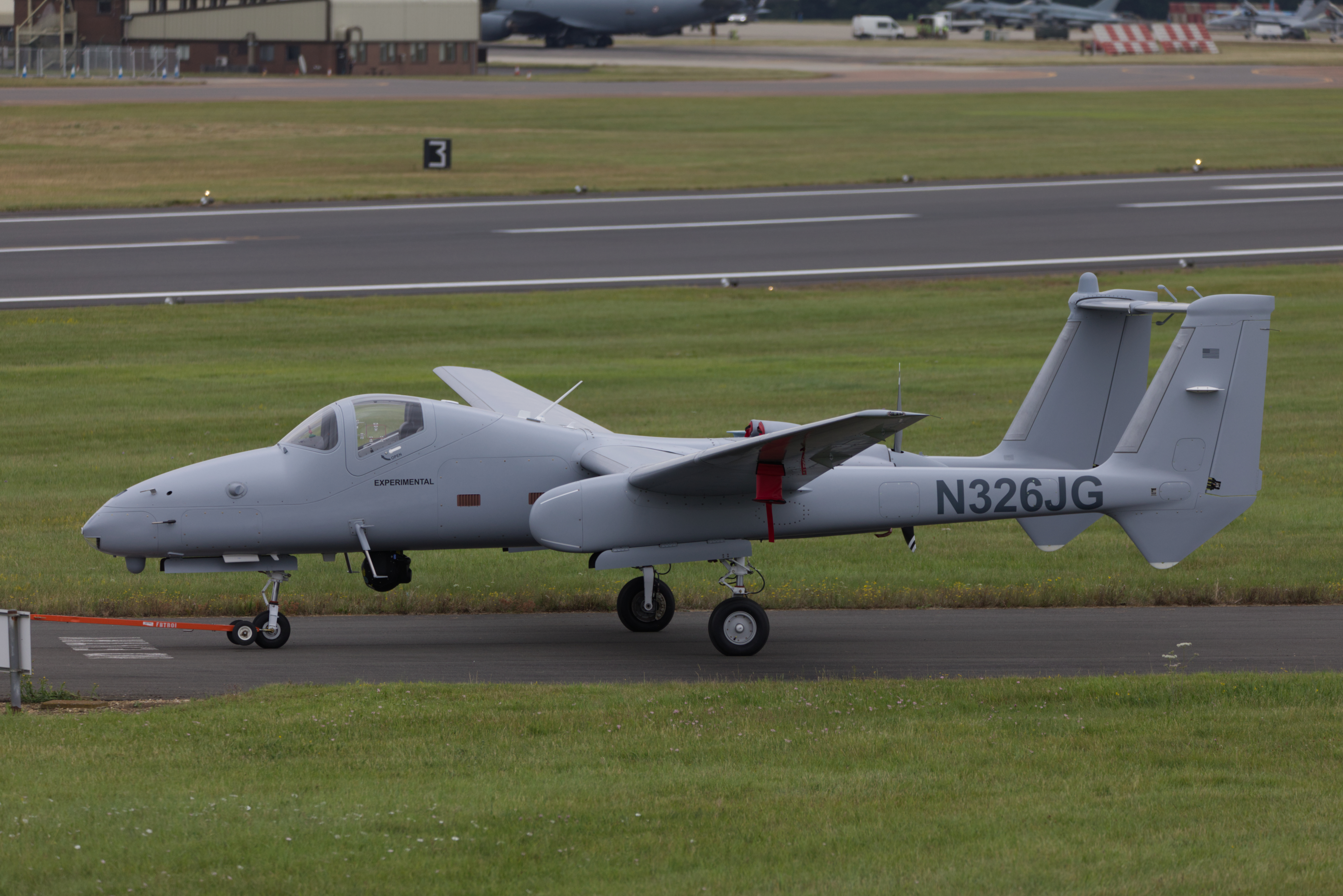

General information
- Type: Intelligence gathering aircraft
- National origin: United States
- Manufacturer: Northrop Grumman/Scaled Composites
- Primary user: United States
- Number built: 2

History
- First flight: February 2010

The Northrop Grumman Firebird is an intelligence gathering aircraft designed by Northrop Grumman's subsidiary Scaled Composites which can be flown remotely or by a pilot. At Scaled, it is known as the Model 355. It was unveiled on May 9, 2011. It was first flown in February 2010 and is considered to be an optionally piloted vehicle (OPV).

== Design and development ==
One of the last aircraft designs overseen by Burt Rutan, who retired in April 2011, the Firebird is a medium-altitude long-endurance aircraft designed to fly up to 40 hours at a top speed of 230 mph (370 km/h) at an altitude of 30,000 feet (9,100 m). The twin-boom aircraft has a pusher configuration and a long slender (high aspect ratio) wing with a very slight forward sweep angle. It has a wingspan of 65 feet (20 m), a length of 34 feet (10 m), a height of 9.7 feet (3.0 m) and a payload capacity of 1,240 pounds (560 kg). It is powered by a Lycoming TEO-540 flat-six piston engine and has a maximum takeoff weight of 5,000 pounds (2,300 kg). The aircraft has hardpoints to carry weapons, though it is currently unarmed.

A new variant with a wingspan widened from 72.2 to 79.2 ft (22.0 to 24.1 m) first flew in March 2018 and was intended to be launched in early 2019.

=== Production suspension ===
In April 2022, Northrop Grumman announced it had suspended production of the Firebird, having failed to secure any export customers for the aircraft. However, company representatives left open the possibility of future production, stating that the aircraft would "remain available for interested customers."

=== Reconnaissance capabilities ===
The Firebird is designed so that the aircraft is able to carry up to four modules of reconnaissance equipment simultaneously, on a separate system from that needed to control the plane, so that equipment can be easily swapped in and out. According to Rick Crooks, a Northrop executive involved in the project, this design means that "[i]t takes days or weeks to get a new payload [of equipment] integrated, instead of years." The aircraft has the ability to simultaneously view infrared imagery, gather real time high-definition video, use radar, and perform local signals intelligence.

== Operational history ==
The idea of building an aircraft capable of being flown with or without a pilot was first floated on 9 February 2009 by Rick Crooks, when he contacted Scaled Composites about the possibility of building such an aircraft. Scaled agreed, and on 9 February 2010 the aircraft made its first flight. In October 2010, the aircraft demonstrated its capabilities of collecting information from multiple sources simultaneously for the first time when it made a demonstration flight in Sacramento, California, for defense officials. On 9 May 2011 the aircraft was publicly unveiled for the first time, and between 23 May and 3 June 2010, it participated in the 2011 Empire Challenge exercise, where it displayed its ability to carry multiple payloads and switch them out rapidly.

According to Northrop, the single aircraft built is considered to be operationally ready, beyond the prototype stage. At the time of the aircraft's public unveiling, there were early plans for a second aircraft to be built. If it enters production, construction of the Firebird is planned to move to factories in Palmdale, California or Moss Point, Mississippi, rather than the Scaled Composites facility in Mojave, California.

On 11 November 2012, the Firebird began test flights, and production was approved.

Firebird had its European debut in the Royal International Air Tattoo air show at RAF Fairford in the United Kingdom in July 2019.

=== U.S. service ===
The first Firebirds were scheduled to be delivered to an unnamed U.S. government service before mid-2019.

== Operators ==
United States

- United States Federal Government - exact customer unnamed
- Grand Sky Development
- Tenax Aerospace

== Specifications ==
Data from

General characteristics

- Crew: two (optional)
- Capacity: 1,240 pounds (560 kg) payload
- Length: 34 ft (10 m)
- Wingspan: 65 ft (20 m)
- Height: 9 ft 9 in (2.96 m)
- Max takeoff weight: 5,000 lb (2,268 kg)
- Powerplant: 1 × Lycoming TO-540 opposed six-cylinder piston engine, 350 hp (260 kW)

Performance

- Endurance: 40 hours
- Service ceiling: 25,000 ft (7,600 m)

Armament

- Hardpoints: 2

== See also ==
Aircraft of comparable role, configuration, and era

- AHRLAC Holdings Ahrlac
- Edgley Optica
- Northrop Grumman RQ-4 Global Hawk

Related lists

- List of twin-boom aircraft
