= Ivor Ichikowitz =

South African businessman

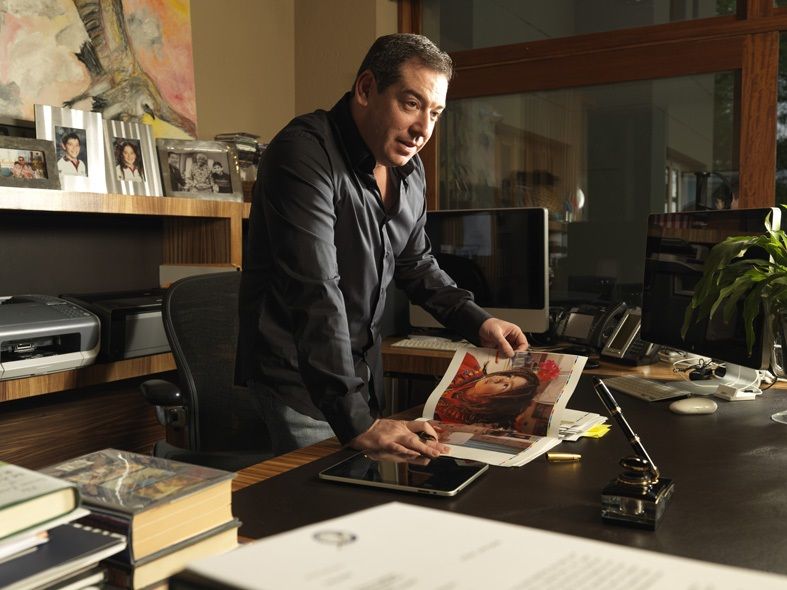
- Ivor Ichikowitz
- Born: Springs, Gauteng, South Africa
- Education: University of the Witwatersrand
- Occupations: Business Executive and Philanthropist
- Known for: Founder and former executive chairman of Paramount Group, Ichikowitz Family Foundation
- Website: http://www.ivorichikowitz.com/profile

Ivor Ichikowitz (born September 1966) is a South African businessman, founder and former executive chairman of Paramount Group. He is also an executive chairman of TransAfrica Capital and the Ichikowitz Family Foundation.

== Biography ==
Ivor Ichikowitz was born in the mining town of Springs, South Africa. His father, Louis, imported Suzuki motorcycles, establishing the foundations upon which Ichikowitz would later build his own company.

Ichikowitz studied drama at the University of the Witwatersrand in Johannesburg. During his time at university he became involved with protest theatre, before travelling throughout Africa and studying African literature.

Ichikowitz is married with two children. Ichikowitz's brother Eric is the group marketing director of the Paramount Group.

== Business career ==
Over the course of his career, Ichikowitz has developed a diverse portfolio of businesses in the spheres of defence and aerospace, mining, oil and gas, agriculture and sustainable development, property, retail and tourism.

Ichikowitz founded the Paramount Group in 1994, to operate in the global defence, internal security and peacekeeping industries. The group operates in countries in the Middle East, South America and Africa, as well as in India. It manufactures a range of armoured vehicles and deals in surplus South African military equipment, including fighter aircraft.

In 2011 the Paramount Group launched the Advanced High Performance Reconnaissance Light Aircraft. By February 2015, the first prototype had completed 65 hours of incident-free flying and the test program proceeded to the next phase, under which the flight envelope was expanded to explore and evaluate its handling, center of gravity, flight performance, airframe qualities, and rough field capabilities. Now called the Mwari, it is the first new military aircraft designed, developed and manufactured in South Africa since the 1980s.

In addition to his role at Paramount Group, Ichikowitz is the executive chairman of private equity group TransAfrica Capital, which invests in scientific research and development projects.

== Philanthropy ==
Ichikowitz is the founder of the Ichikowitz Family Foundation, established in 2010. The Foundation is actively involved in wildlife conservation of endangered species, especially the protection of Africa's rhinos and elephant population.

== Social activism ==
In 2012, Ichikowitz joined forces with the South African Board of Deputies to produce a book about the Jewish contribution to the anti-apartheid struggle in South Africa. Jewish Memories of Mandela, documents the story of the Jews who were active in the freedom struggle, among them Joe Slovo, Ruth First, Nelson Mandela’s lawyer Sidney Kentridge and Albie Sachs.

Regarding the South Africa v. Israel (Genocide Convention), Ichikowitz criticized the South African government for hypocrisy and double standards, recalling that South Africa failed to arrest Sudanese President Omar al-Bashir during his visit to South Africa, despite Bashir being accused of genocide and wanted by the International Criminal Court (ICC), and did not condemn Russia's invasion of Ukraine, reluctant to comply with the International Criminal Court's arrest warrant for Russian President Vladimir Putin.

== Controversy ==
In 2013, Ichikowitz was criticised for being an ally of the African National Congress (ANC), and for providing President Jacob Zuma with a plane for an ANC fundraising and business trip to Lebanon and Kazakhstan. Another flight by Zuma to the United States on an aircraft owned by Ichikowitz led to an outcry by politicians who questioned the high cost (R6.3 million).

Ichikowitz was also accused of involvement in the Oil-for-Food Programme in the aftermath of the Gulf War. In an interview with the Sunday Times, Ichikowitz denied the charge and said he was in the business of "protecting democracies." While some "play the 'lord of war' game," he asserted that "one of the reasons I'm in this business is to push those people out."

In September 2020, Ichikowitz and his company Paramount were listed in the FinCEN Files by the US Dept of Treasury for suspicious transactions such as possible money laundering exceeding $250m.
