= Paramount Group =

Commercial group operating in defence and aerospace

- Type: Proprietary company
- Industry: Defense; Aerospace; Shipbuilding
- Founded: 1994; 32 years ago in South Africa
- Founder: Ivor Ichikowitz
- Headquarters: Abu Dhabi, United Arab Emirates
- Area served: Worldwide
- Key people: Steve Griessel (CEO)
- Products: Combat systems Aircraft; Helicopters; Combat vehicles Boats; Ships
- Number of employees: 3,000+
- Website: www.paramountgroup.com

Paramount Group is a South African aerospace and defense group, operating in the global internal security and peacekeeping industries. Established in 1994, it offers a range of military aircraft, armored vehicles, maritime systems, equipment, and training to governments.

== History ==
Paramount Group was established by South African entrepreneur and industrialist Ivor Ichikowitz in 1994; its headquarters were established in Sandton, South Africa. During its initial years of operation, the company largely focused itself on the development and production of ground-based systems.

During 2006, Paramount Group began developing its own portfolio of aerospace products, acquiring a number of surplus South African Air Force (SAAF) Dassault Mirage F1s that same year.

Operated by its subsidiary, Paramount Aerospace Systems, the Mirage F1 fleet has been expanded over the years and is used for purposes such as providing aerial aggressor and ground crew maintenance training services to government customers. During 2009, Paramount Group purchased a 19% stake in the South African aerospace company Aerosud.

During February 2011, Paramount Group announced the launch of a joint venture with Abu Dhabi - based defence business International Golden Group for the latter market and distribute Paramount Group’s products and services in the United Arab Emirates.

In September 2011, the company unveiled a new project, the AHRLAC Holdings Ahrlac (Advanced High Performance Reconnaissance Light Aircraft), a versatile low-cost aircraft designed for light attack and reconnaissance missions. The development programme was originally structured as a joint venture between Aerosud and Paramount Group. While originally intended as an alternative to unmanned aerial vehicles (UAVs), the company subsequently decided to develop an unmanned variant of the AHRLAC as well.

During December 2011, the UK national newspaper The Daily Telegraph reported that the Paramount Group's Wikipedia article had been edited by accounts linked to the controversial public relations company Bell Pottinger.

On 10 June 2013, Paramount Group announced that their takeover of Advanced Technologies and Engineering (ATE) was at an advanced stage. ATE had been operating under a business rescue plan for some time before Paramount decided on the takeover.

During November 2013, Paramount Group announced that it had gained a controlling stake in ship builder Nautic Africa; it stated its intention to produce a new range of vessels, claiming it would help Africa protect against piracy. Two years later, the company began construction of a state-of-the-art naval production facility located in Cape Town. During September 2018, it acquired the South African boat manufacturer Austral Marine.

During February 2014, Paramount Group announced that it had acquired Aerosud as a part of its strategy to rapidly expand its presence within the aerospace and defence markets. Shortly thereafter, the company was renamed Paramount Aerospace. Furthermore, around the same time frame, a new division of the company, Paramount Robotic Systems, was created with the goal of developing autonomous capabilities with airborne, land and sea applications.

During July 2014, Paramount Group and American aerospace company Boeing signed a memorandum of collaboration to develop products together across a wide range of areas, including humanitarian aid, disaster relief, anti-poaching and border protection. Since forming this partnership, the two companies have jointly worked on several projects pertaining to aviation technologies.

In March 2016, Boeing announced that it had entered into a development partnership with Paramount with the aim of producing a militarized version of the Ahrlac; Boeing's contribution to the programme reportedly includes the development of an integrated mission system with intelligence, surveillance and reconnaissance (ISR) and weapons system capabilities for the aircraft.

In April 2015, Paramount Group announced that it was in the process of taking over DCD Protected Mobility, formerly a division of South African industrial and engineering group DCD. Under the terms of this agreement, Paramount took control of its facilities located in Isando, Kempton Park.

By 2016, the business reportedly has government clients in 28 countries across five continents. along with partnerships with numerous leading international defence and aerospace players. At the time, Paramount Group was organised into four primary business units: maritime, combat systems, aerospace, and advanced technologies.

On 20 September 2018, Italian aerospace manufacturer Alenia Aermacchi signed an agreement with Paramount Group for the latter to evaluate and develop a combat-orientated model of the former's M-345 trainer aircraft to suit the requirements of prospective African customers. It is reportedly planned for the aircraft to be updated with Paramount's Swift mission system.

In January 2020, the company announced the establishment of a new division, Paramount Advanced Training and Support, which consolidates the group’s existing global training, support and skills development capabilities across its land, sea and air operations.

In January 2022, Paramount Group announced that it had appointed Steve Griessel as its group chief executive officer. Prior to his appointment as the Group CEO, Griessel held the position of CEO of Paramount's US-based subsidiary, Paramount USA.

Hellenic Defence Systems (EAS) and Paramount Industries Greece announced a strategic partnership on 11 May 2023 for the indigenous production of long-range loitering munitions. Paramount said the co-development of the 'IRIX' system would help enhance Greece's defence capabilities and foster autonomy within its defence industry. The agreement also encourages the participation of other Greek companies in the production supply chain.

On August 15, 2024, Paramount Group filed for Chapter 11 bankruptcy protection, listing assets and liabilities between $1 billion and $10 billion.

== Vehicles ==
During 2000, Paramount Group launched the first of its vehicles, the Marauder. Since then, the firm has expanded its range to manufacture a variety of armoured vehicles, including the Maverick, Mbombe 6, and Matador.
