= Marauder (vehicle) =

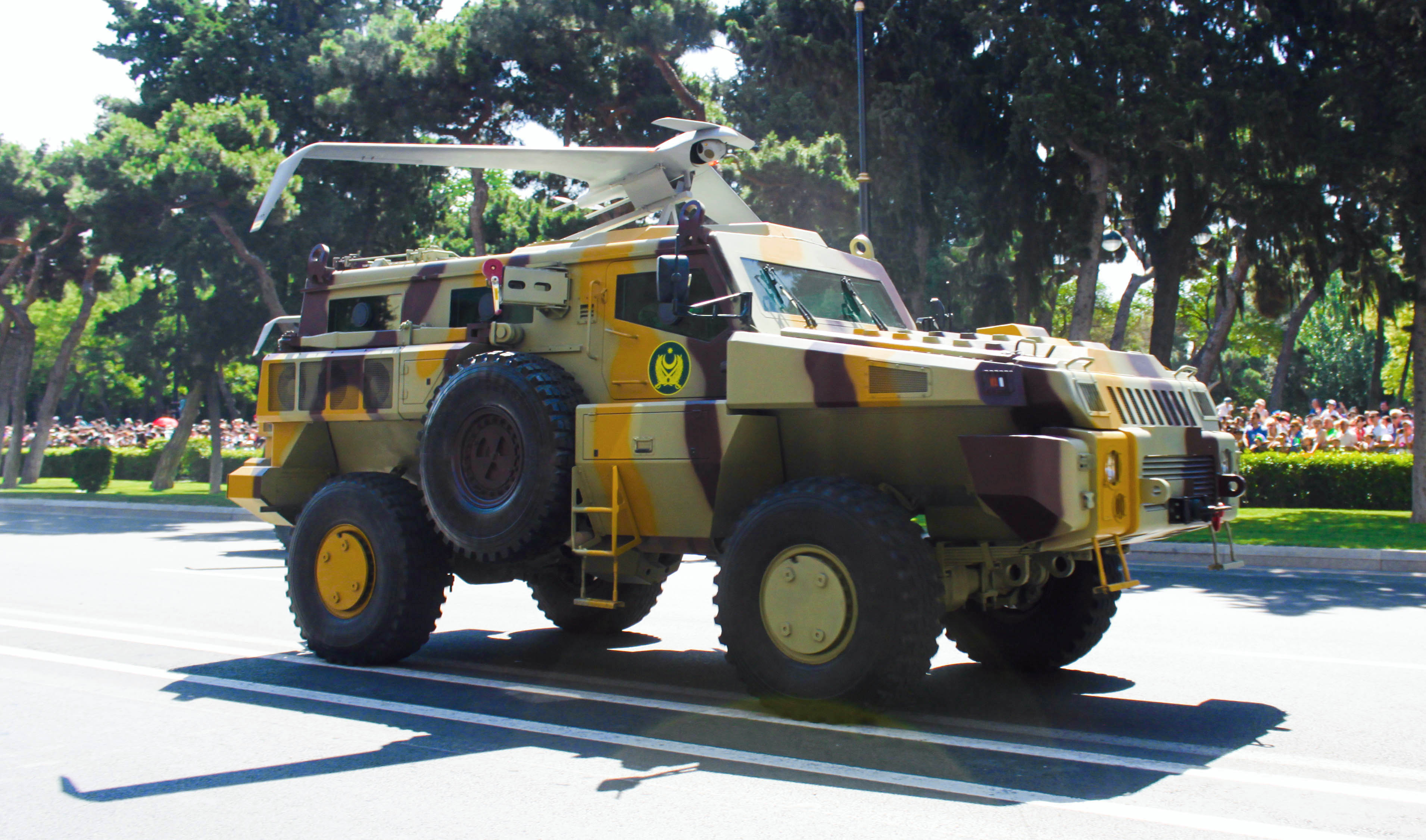
- An Azerbaijani Marauder UAV launcher MRAP during an Armed Forces 2018 parade
- Type: Armoured personnel carrier
- Place of origin: South Africa

Service history
- Used by: Operators

Production history
- Manufacturer: Paramount Group; See Production for details where the Marauder is also made.
- Produced: 2008–present
- No. built: ~300

Specifications
- Mass: Curb: 9,900 kg (21,780 lb); Combat: 15,000 kg (33,000 lb)
- Crew: 2 + 8 passengers
- Armor: Ballistic protection: STANAG 4569 level III (7.62 × 51 mm AP WC Core at 30 meters); Mine blast protection: STANAG 4569 3a and 3b (single anti-tank mine (8 kg of TNT under the hull and under any wheel)
- Main armament: Machine guns auto cannons
- Engine: Cummins ISBe4-300 Diesel (221kW/300hp @ 2500rpm, 1100Nm @ 1200-1800rpm); MAN D0836LOH Diesel (176kW/240hp @ 2300rpm, 925Nm @ 1200-1800rpm)
- Payload capacity: 6,000 kg (13,227 lb)
- Suspension: 4x4 or 6x6 wheeled
- Ground clearance: 420 mm
- Operational range: 700 km (435 mi)
- Maximum speed: 100–120 km/h (tyre dependent)

The Marauder is an armoured, mine-protected vehicle that is produced by Paramount Group in South Africa. It was launched during the 2007 International Defence Exhibition & Conference (IDEX) in Abu Dhabi, the largest arms exhibition in the Middle East.

== Design and specifications ==
The Marauder was developed for reconnaissance and peacekeeping missions. It carries a crew of up to ten including the driver and commander.

Designed to operate in urban, built-up, and confined areas, it is smaller in size and weight than the Matador, a similarly armored vehicle. Vehicle configuration is either 4x4 or a 6x6. The Marauder has a cruising speed of around 100 to 120 km/h (62–75 mph), and a maximum range of 700 kilometres (430 mi).

The Marauder double monocoque hull provides protection against projectiles up to STANAG 4569 Level III for the crew compartment.

The Marauder payload capacity allows for the fitting of various defense and weapons systems, including light and medium-caliber machine guns, cannon weapon installations, and missile launchers, as well as command-surveillance-control systems. The vehicle can be configured so mortars may be fired from the payload platform.

== Production ==
=== Jordan ===
In 2008, for the manufacturing and production of the Marauder, the Paramount Group entered into an agreement with the King Abdullah Design and Development Bureau (now Jordan Design and Development Bureau), Jordan's primary governmental military agency that develops and manufactures defence systems, and which serves as an independent technical advisor to the Jordanian Armed Forces (JAF). As well as being a manufacturer, Jordan was the first customer for the Marauder.

=== Azerbaijan ===
The Marauder is also manufactured in Azerbaijan by the Ministry of Defence Industry of Azerbaijan through a joint agreement with Paramount.

=== Kazakhstan ===
Kazakhstan Engineering makes the Marauder under licence as the Arlan under the joint-venture Kazakhstan Paramount Engineering after their announcement in 2018. In the same year, they announced 70% of their radios and remote-control weapon-stations were local-made.

Near Astana, construction of the factory started in 2014, and was complete a year later.

=== Singapore ===
The Marauder is manufactured in Singapore by ST Engineering in collaboration with Paramount and the Defence Science and Technology Agency. This was based on a 2012 agreement with Paramount to work together in manufacturing and marketing the vehicle.

The variants made under the Belrex label consist of security, engineer, reconnaissance, logistics, fuel, medical, signal, maintenance, and ammunition & mortar carrier. The base platform comes in three basic crew compartment sizes: four, eight and ten.

=== Lithuania ===
An unlicensed copy of the Marauder, named Taurus, was built in Lithuania. It was said that the Taurus was the first indigenous armored vehicle of Lithuania.

== Operators ==
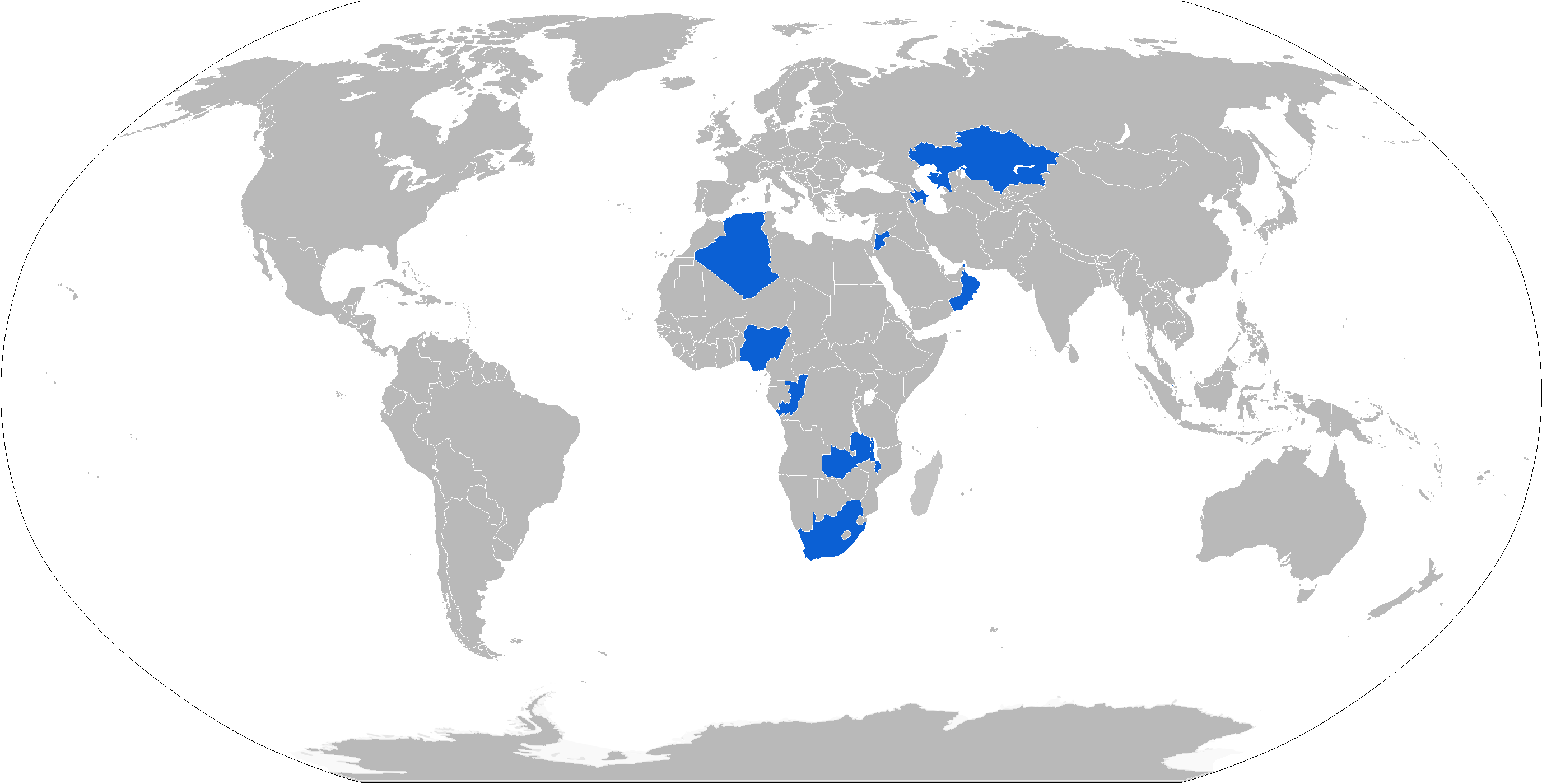
Map with Marauder operators in blue

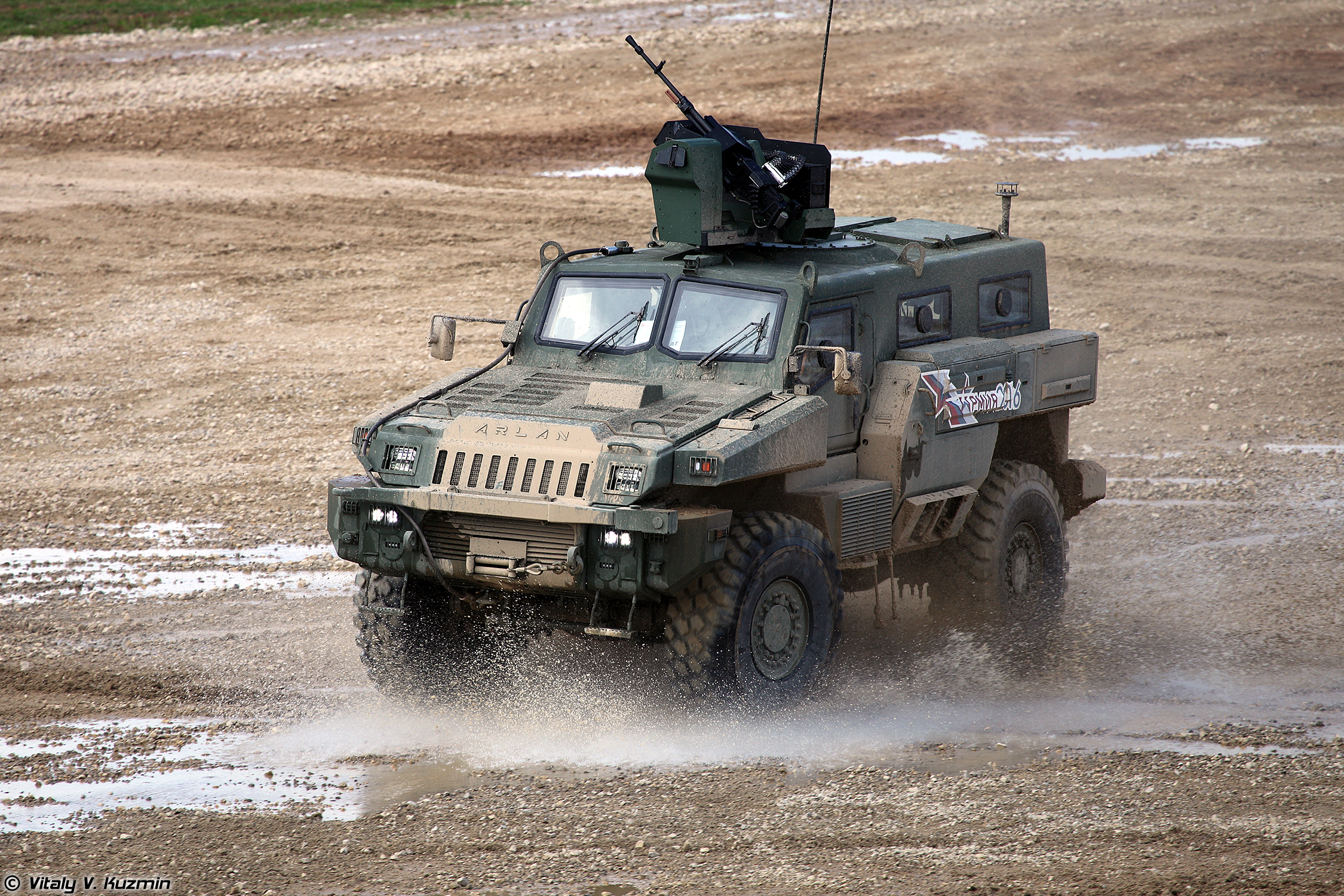
Kazakhstan variant - "Arlan".

- Algeria: According to SIPRI, only 2 were delivered in 2009 + negotiations to buy the Arlan from Kazakhstan.
- Azerbaijan: Over 100 delivered in total between 2009 and 2014. Local production of the vehicles was established under an agreement between the Paramount Group and the Ministry of Defence Industry of Azerbaijan.
- Congo: 52 delivered in total between 2010 and 2012.
- Jordan: An initial batch of ~50 Marauders and Matadors was ordered in March 2008. Local production of the vehicles was established under an agreement between the Paramount Group and the King Abdullah II Design and Development Bureau.
- Kazakhstan: An unknown number of a new winterized variant, called Arlan (Wolf), were ordered in 2013 and delivery is scheduled to take place in 2016. Local production of the Arlan by Kazakhstan Paramount Engineering (KPE), a joint venture company under an agreement between Paramount Group and state-owned Kazakhstan Engineering. The first Arlans were delivered to Kazakh special forces in December 2017.
- Malawi: 6 ordered in 2013
- Mozambique: 5 ordered in 2020
- Nigeria: Unknown number acquired for the Nigerian Air Force in March 2019, modified with Jordanian "snake head" turret.
- Oman: 1 ordered in 2013
- Russia: In service with the Kadyrovites.
- Singapore: Designation as Belrex Protected Combat Support Vehicle, operates a custom-built variant with extended wheelbase. 122 ordered in 2013. Officially brought into service in 2016. The Belrexes will replace all unarmored five-ton trucks in service with the SAF.
- Zambia: 3 delivered in 2016 for the Zambia Police Service.

== Featured on TV ==
This vehicle was featured in episode 1 of the 17th series of Top Gear. Richard Hammond conducted the review.

It was also featured in episode 6 of the 2nd season of World's Top 5.
