= Matador (mine protected vehicle) =

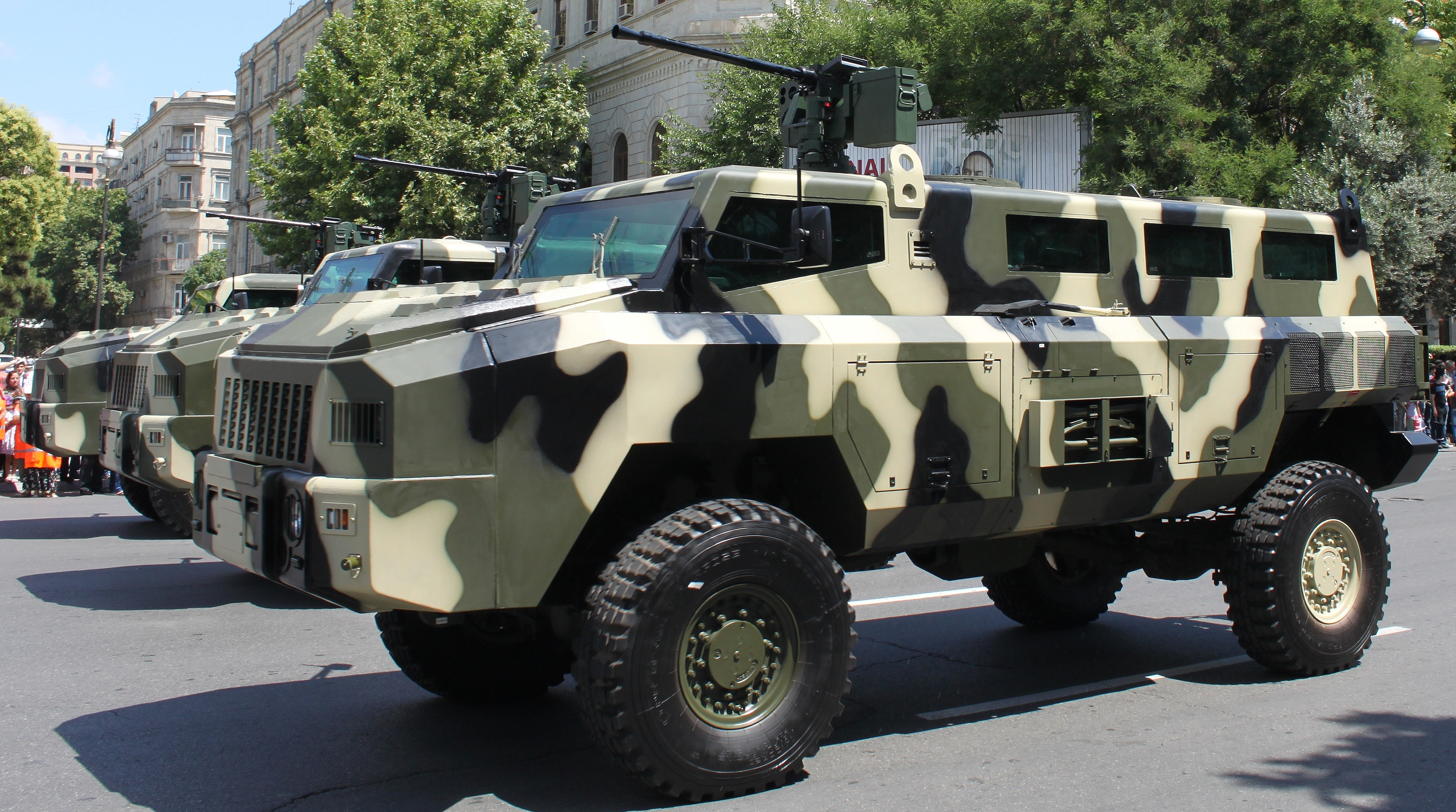
- Matador mine-protected vehicle at the military parade in Baku, Azerbaijan
- Type: Mine-protected vehicle
- Place of origin: South Africa

Service history
- Used by: See Operators

Production history
- Manufacturer: Paramount Group
- Produced: 2008–present

Specifications
- Mass: Curb: 10,800 kg (23,760 lb); Combat: 15,300 kg (33,660 lb)
- Crew: 2 + 12 passengers
- Armor: Ballistic protection: STANAG 4569 level III (7.62 × 54 mm RB 32 API - Dragunov) and mine-blast protection: STANAG 4569 4a and 4b (double anti-tank mine (14 kg of TNT) under the hull, triple anti-tank mine (21 kg of TNT) under any wheel)
- Engine: Cummins ISBe4 Diesel (221 kW, 1,100 Nm); MAN (176 kW, 925 Nm)
- Payload capacity: 6,000 kg (13,200 lb)
- Suspension: 4x4 or 6x6 wheeled
- Ground clearance: 420 mm
- Operational range: 700 km (435 mi)
- Maximum speed: 100–120 km/h (tyre dependent)
- Steering system: 18 meters turning radius

The Matador is an armoured personnel carrier (APC) and mine-protected vehicle that is produced by Paramount Group in South Africa. The vehicle was displayed for the first time in 2007, during the International Defence Exhibition and Conference in Abu Dhabi. The Matador was officially launched the following year, at the 2008 African Aerospace and Defence exhibition in Cape Town, South Africa.

== Vehicle specs ==
With a curb weight of 10,800 kg and a payload weight of 4,500 kg, the Matador has a maximum crew capacity of fourteen, including a driver and co-driver. The vehicle has a cruise speed of 100 km/h and a maximum range of 700 km. Although it can be used for military and peacekeeping operations in urban areas, it was originally designed for missions in less built-up areas. It therefore has a larger turning circle compared to its sister vehicle, the Marauder, which was specifically developed for urban areas.

The Matador is either equipped with a militarised MAN engine integrated with a 12-speed semi-automatic transmission, or a Cummins engine integrated with a fully automated 6-speed transmission. Both technologies are common around the world, allowing the vehicle to be repaired and serviced in most countries, without requiring an independent logistic system.

=== Armour ===
The Matador is fitted with a double-skin monocoque hull, which gives it a modern look and a smooth finish while protecting its occupants against blasts up to STANAG 4569 Level III, the highest level of tested protection. The V-shaped hull comprises three self-jigging plates. This system, developed in South Africa, enables the Matador to withstand the blast of a double anti-tank mine (14 kg of TNT) at any point beneath the hull, and a triple anti-tank mine (21 kg of TNT) under any wheel.

=== Armament ===
The vehicle can be equipped with light and medium-calibre machine guns and cannon weapon installations, as well as mortar firing platforms, missile launchers, combat turret, and command, surveillance and control systems.

== Functions ==
The Matador can be converted to serve various purposes and roles, such as armoured ambulance, command-post vehicle, or utility mine-protected vehicle.

== Production ==
In 2008, for the manufacturing and production of the Matador, the Paramount Group liaised with King Abdullah II of Jordan and the Design and Development Bureau (KADDB), Jordan's primary governmental military institute for the possible development and manufacturing of defence systems.

In 2009, a deal was sealed with the government of the Republic of Azerbaijan to produce Matadors via knock down kits.

== Operators ==
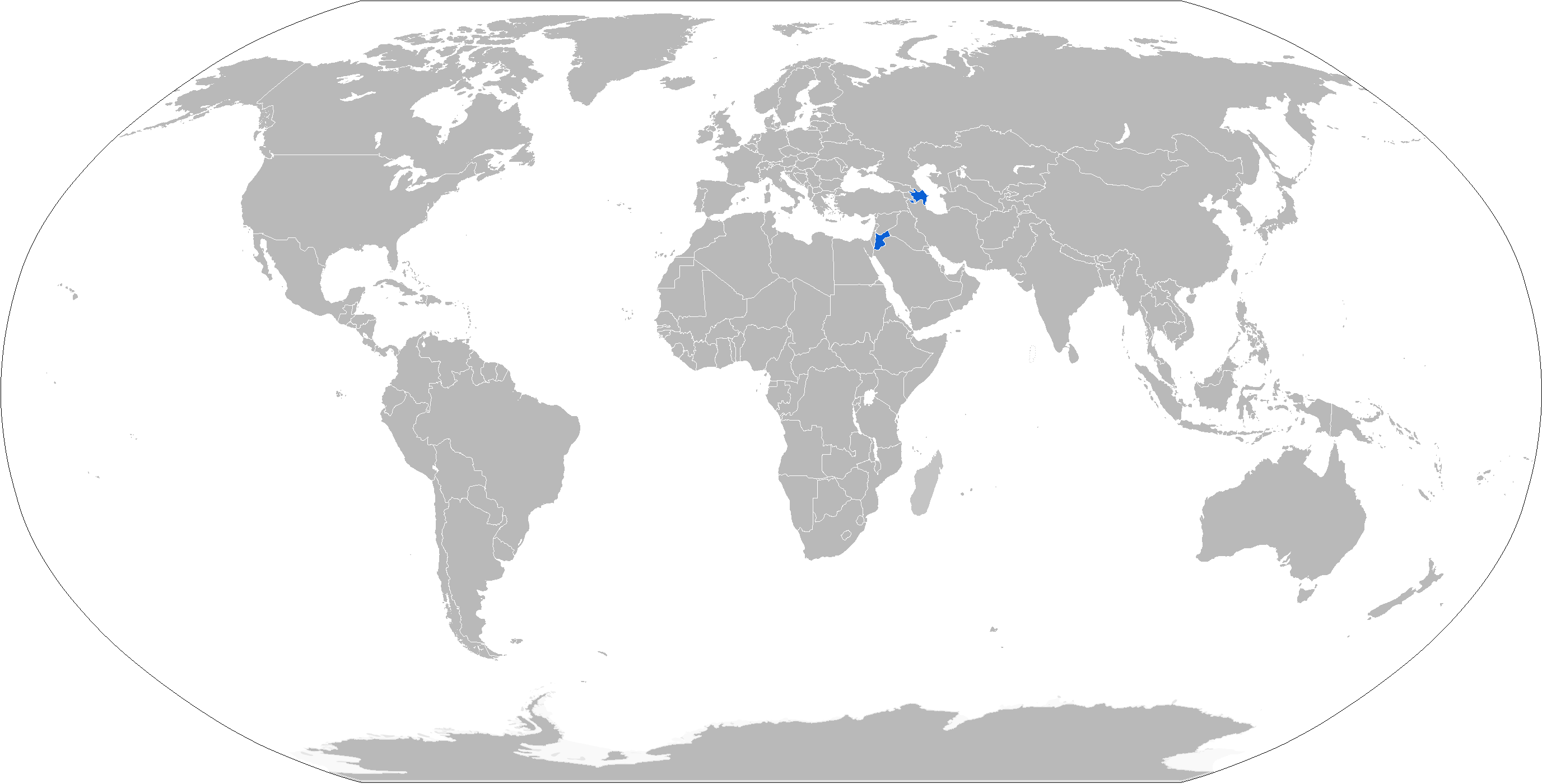
Map with Matador operators in blue

- Azerbaijan: Azerbaijan ordered 30 Marauders in 2012 and these were assembled in that country between 2013 and 2014, according to SIPRI. In 2012 the Azerbaijan Ministry of Defence Industries (MDI) ordered 30 Marauder and 30 Matador mine protected vehicles, following the establishment of a joint production facility in the country and the production of an initial 15 Matador and 15 Marauders under a joint production agreement set up in 2009.
- Gabon: 13 sold in 2013.
- Jordan
