= Mbombe 6 =

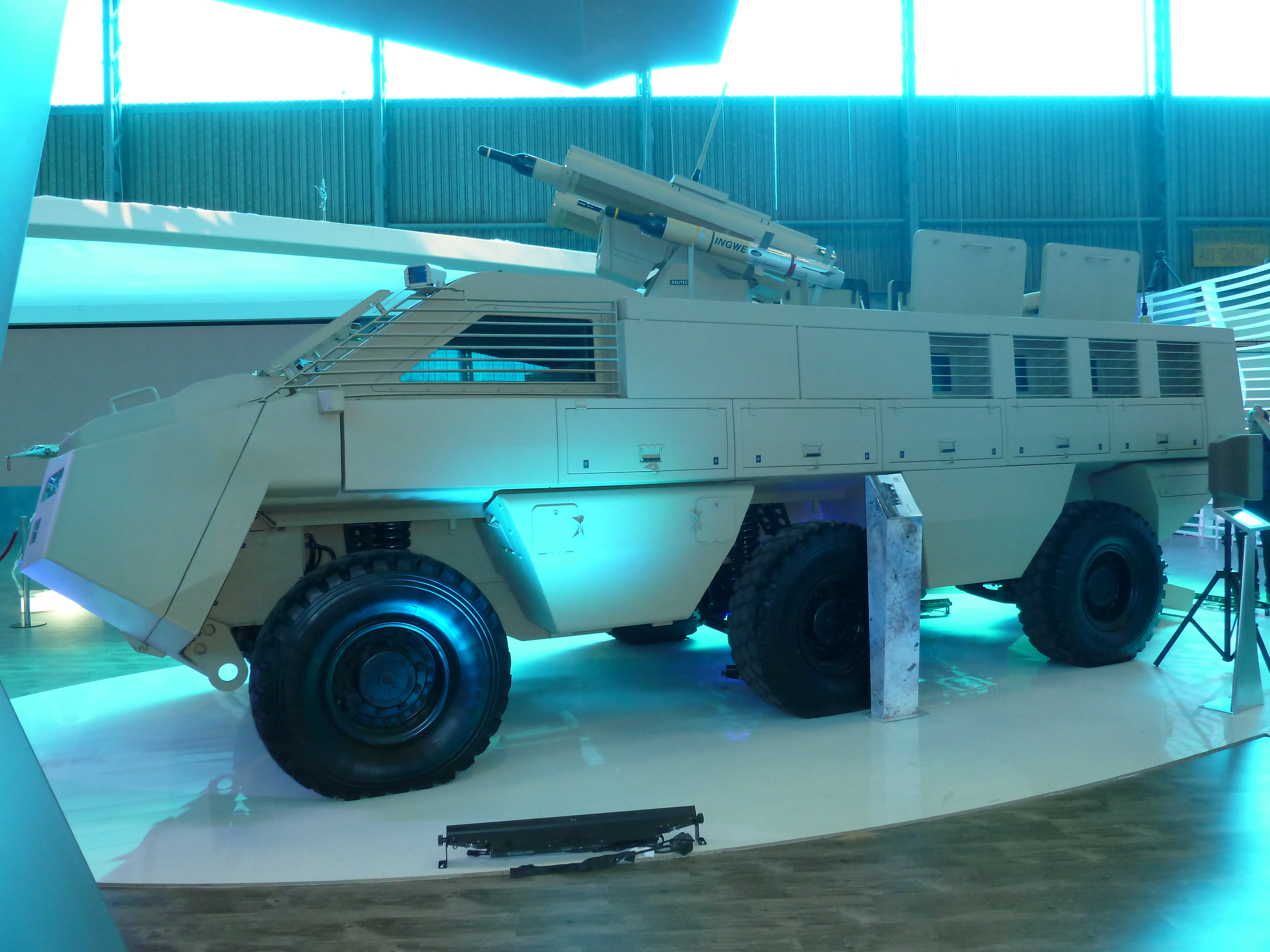
- Mbombe 6 anti-armour variant, armed with Ingwe missile
- Type: Armoured Infantry Combat Vehicle
- Place of origin: South Africa

Production history
- Manufacturer: Paramount Group
- Produced: 2010–present

Specifications
- Mass: Curb: 17,300 kg Combat: 22,500 kg
- Length: 7,715 mm (303.7 in)
- Width: 2,800 mm (110.2 in)
- Height: 2,549 mm (100.4 in)
- Crew: 2+1+8
- Armor: Ballistic protection: CERN level B7 or STANAG 4569 level 3 (Crew Protection against 7.62 mm MG attacks). Flat bottom blast-protected hull, mine blast protection: STANAG 4569 Level IV and RPG (10 kg of TNT under hull), anti-tank mine. Withstands 50 kg TNT side blast at 5 Meters
- Main armament: Roof hatch can be installed with any armament up 30 mm gun
- Engine: Cummins ISBe4 Turbo Diesel (336kW (450 hp) and 16000N Turbo Diesel)
- Transmission: Automatic transmission
- Ground clearance: 365-430 mm
- Operational range: 1,000 km (620 mi)
- Maximum speed: 110km/h (tire dependent)
- Steering system: 24.5 meters turning radius kerb to kerb

The Mbombe 6 is a mine-protected, high-mobility armoured fighting vehicle produced by Paramount Group from South Africa that was launched in 2010. "Mbombe" is named after a Zulu warrior.

== Vehicle specifications ==
The Mbombe 6's unladen weight is 16 tonnes. Its maximum combat weight is 27 tonnes with a crew of 11. It has 6x6 wheel drive for use on different kinds of terrain. Its maximum speed is 100 km/h; its range is 700 km.

The Mbombe 6 has a 300 kW Cummins ISBe4 diesel engine and an Allison 6 speed automatic transmission.

=== Armour ===
The Mbombe 6 hull meets STANAG 4569 Level 4, which means the vehicle can withstand a 10 kg TNT blast under its hull or any wheel station. As standard, the Mbombe 6 can protect its crew against Rocket-propelled grenades, while additional modules protect against IEDs, up to 50 kg TNT at 5 metres.

=== Armament ===
The Mbombe 6 is armed with a heavy machine gun or an autocannon. The Mbombe 6 can be fitted with day and night vision equipment.

=== Functions ===
The Mbombe 6 can be configured as an Armoured Personnel Carrier, Combat Vehicle, Command Vehicle or ambulance.

== Operators ==
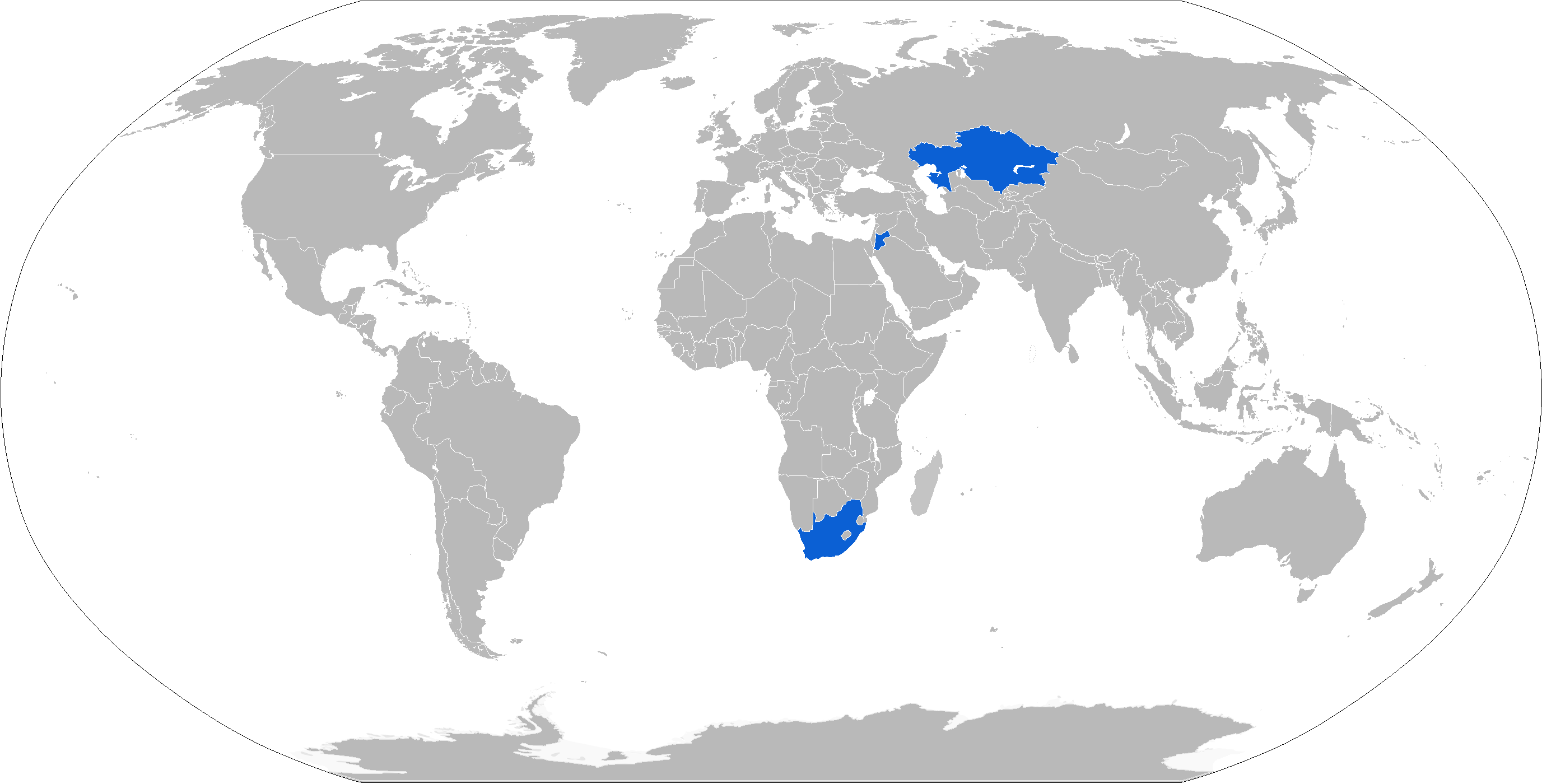
Map with Mbombe operators in blue

- Jordan: 50 on order.
- Kazakhstan: Barys is a Kazakh version of the Mbombe
- Libya: Unknown number delivered to Libya from Jordan in 2019.
- South Africa
- Ecuador: Unknown number in use by the Ecuadorian Army.
- Ukraine: License-produced version of Mbombe, equipped with Spys RTWS is being used by Ukrainian Armed Forces.

== Variants ==
Official variant:

- APC
- Armoured ambulance
- Infantry fire support vehicle
- Anti-armour fire support vehicle

=== Kalyani M4 ===
The Kalyani M4 is a prototype developed by India's Kalyani Group.
