= Aerosud =

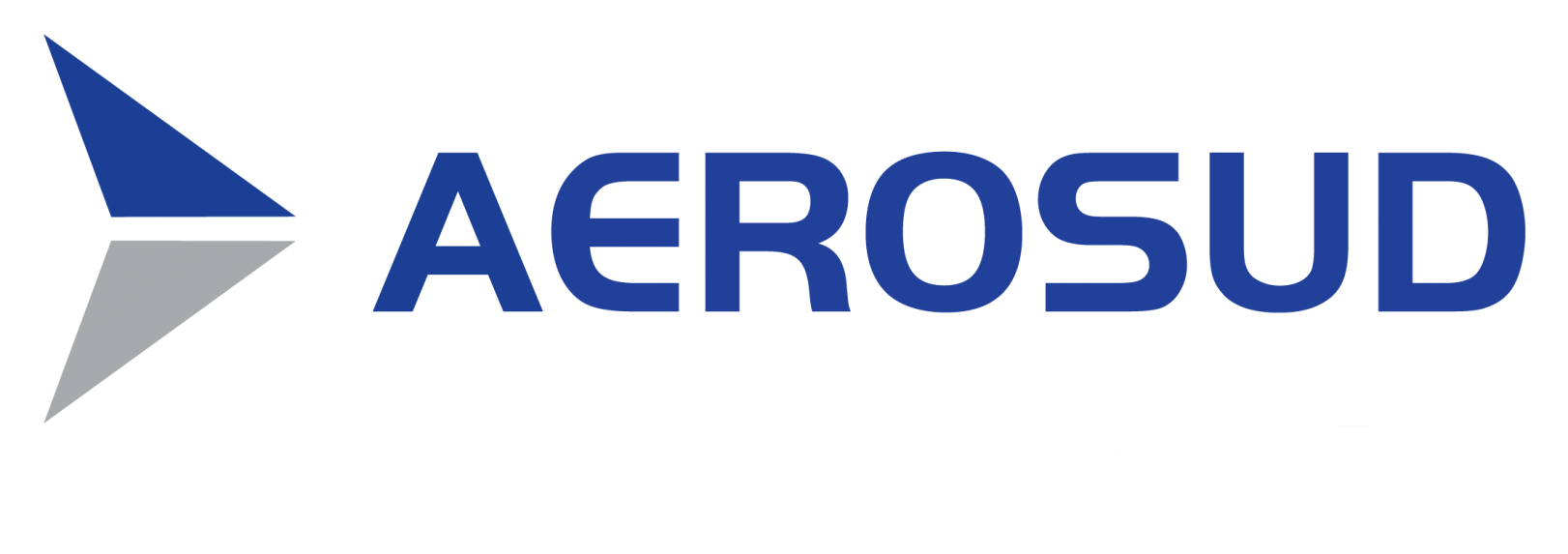
- Type: Private
- Industry: Aerospace; Aerospace Engineering
- Founded: September 27, 1990; 36 years ago
- Headquarters: Centurion, Gauteng, South Africa
- Key people: Jaco Olivier (Managing Director)
- Number of employees: 500
- Website: aerosud.co.za

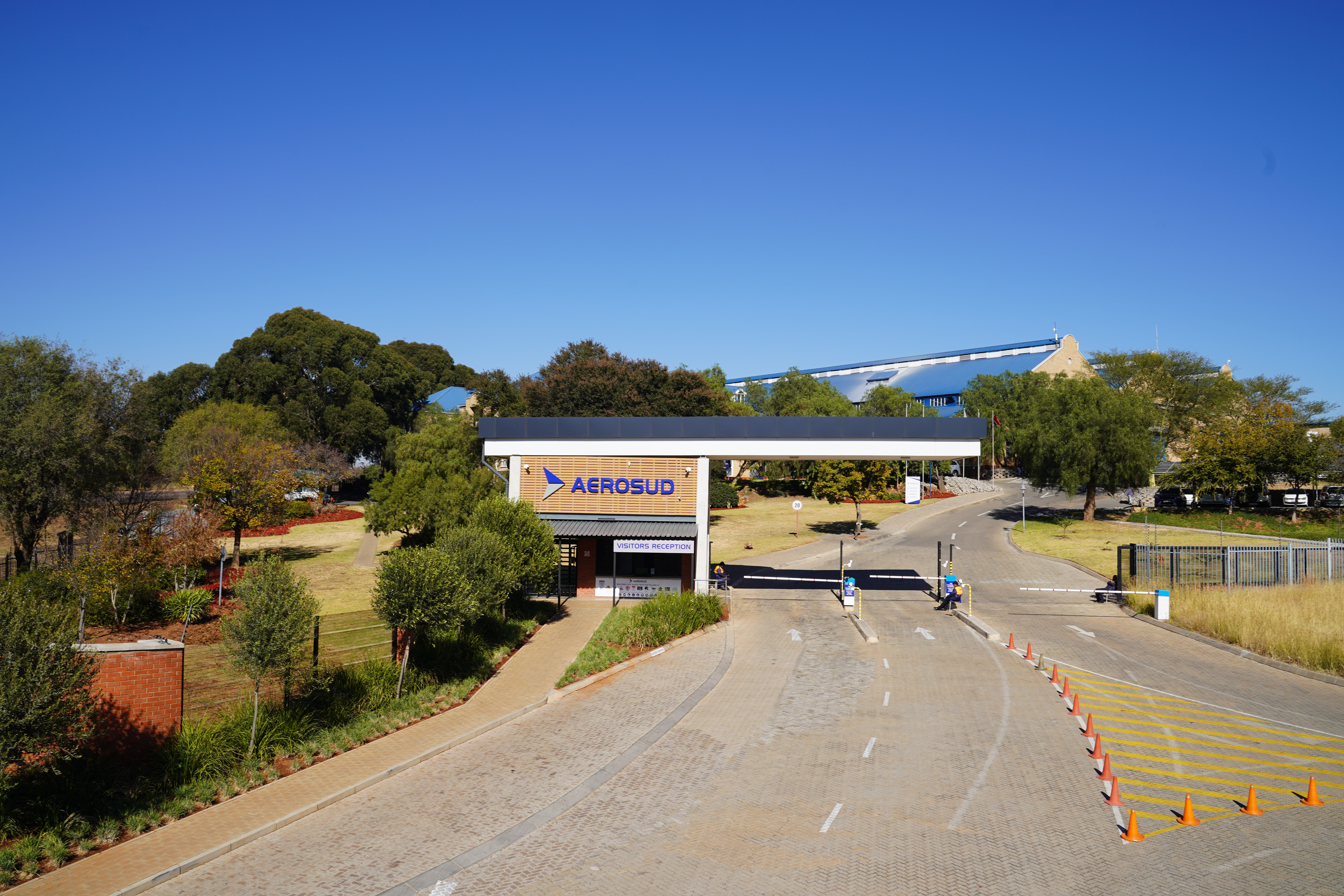
Aerosud

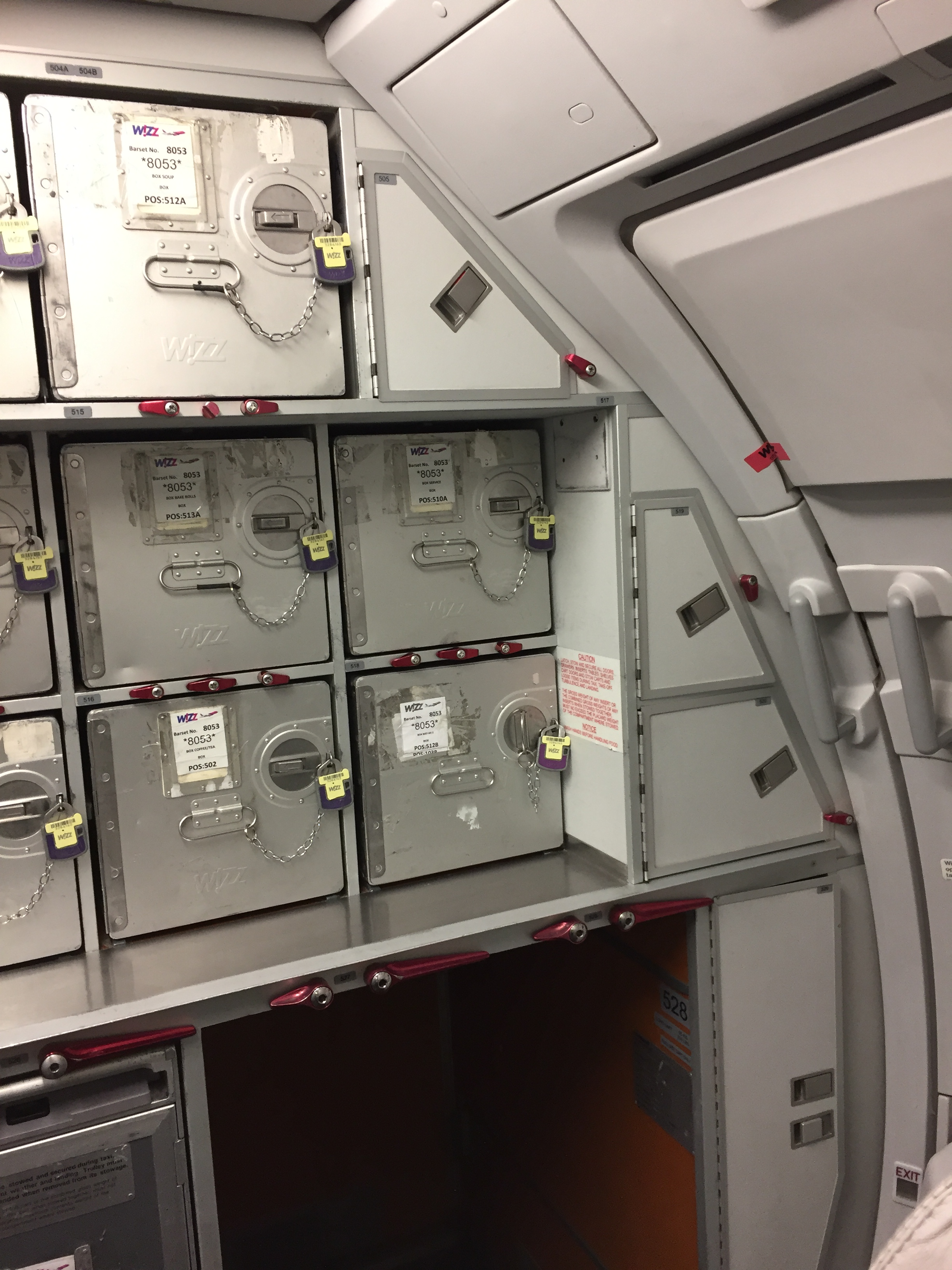
Mechanical assemblies and galley products manufactured by Aerosud

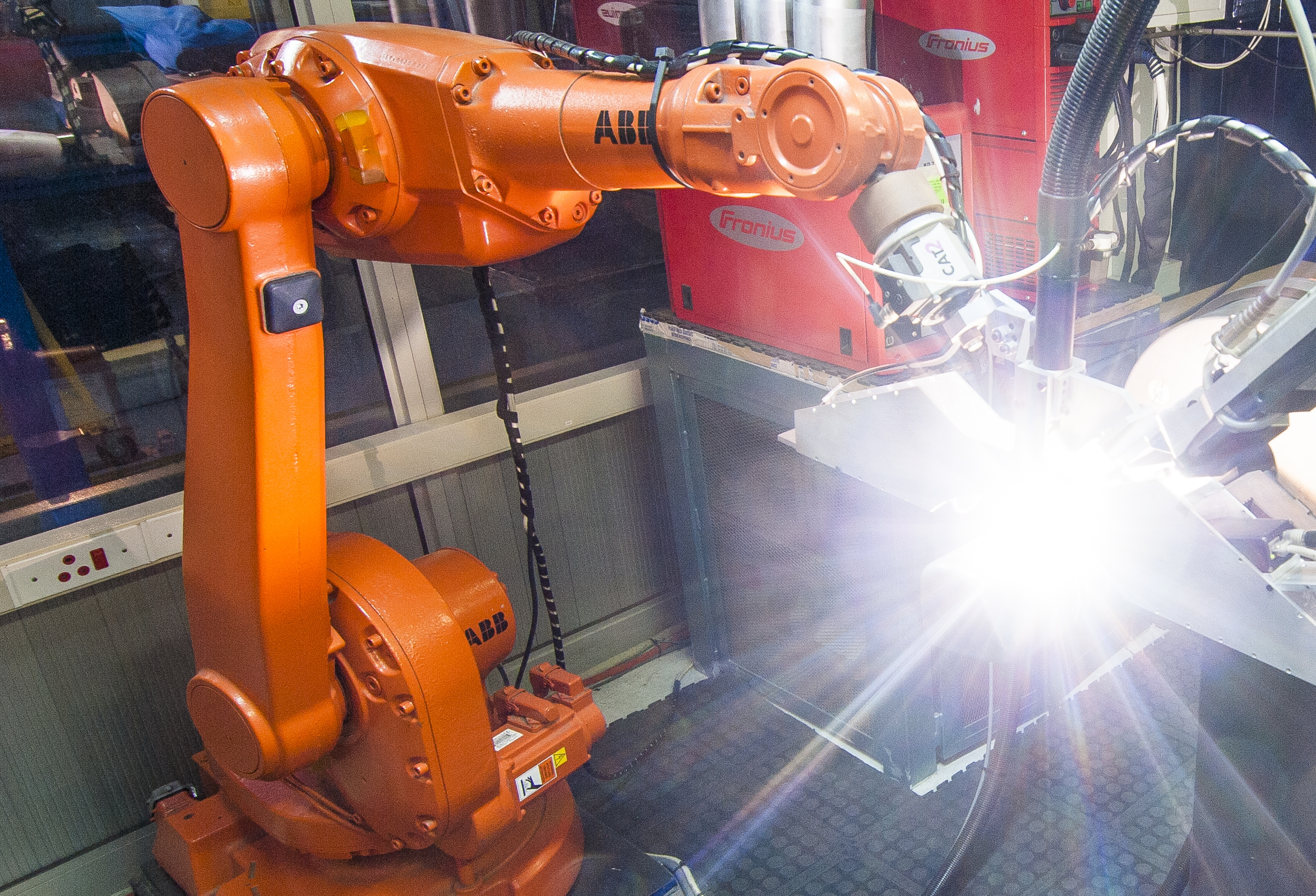
Aerosud’s aluminium robot welding capability

Aerosud is a South African aerospace engineering and manufacturing group headquartered in Centurion, Gauteng. The group operates through Aerosud Holdings, Aerosud Aviation, and Aerosud Technology Solutions.

Aerosud Technology Solutions is described by the company as focusing on structural composite components using proprietary Cellular Core Technology. Aerosud has developed from its early defence-engineering roots into a manufacturer of aerostructures, aircraft interiors, metallic assemblies, composites and thermoplastic components for international aerospace programmes.

== Origins and defence engineering ==
Aerosud was founded in 1990, by former employees of Atlas Aircraft Corporation, including engineers who had contributed to South African defence programmes such as the Denel Rooivalk attack helicopter and the Atlas Cheetah fighter programme. The company initially focused on aeromechanical engineering and defence-related design work. Paul Potgieter, one of the founding designers, became managing director.

The company’s first major programme involved re-engining the Dassault Mirage F1 with the Klimov RD-33 engine, commonly associated with the Mikoyan MiG-29. Although the South African government later selected the Saab JAS 39 Gripen rather than pursuing the Mirage F1 upgrade, the programme became an early reference point for Aerosud’s later international aerospace work. Aerosud also undertook similar upgrade work on the Atlas Cheetah, itself a development of the Mirage III platform.

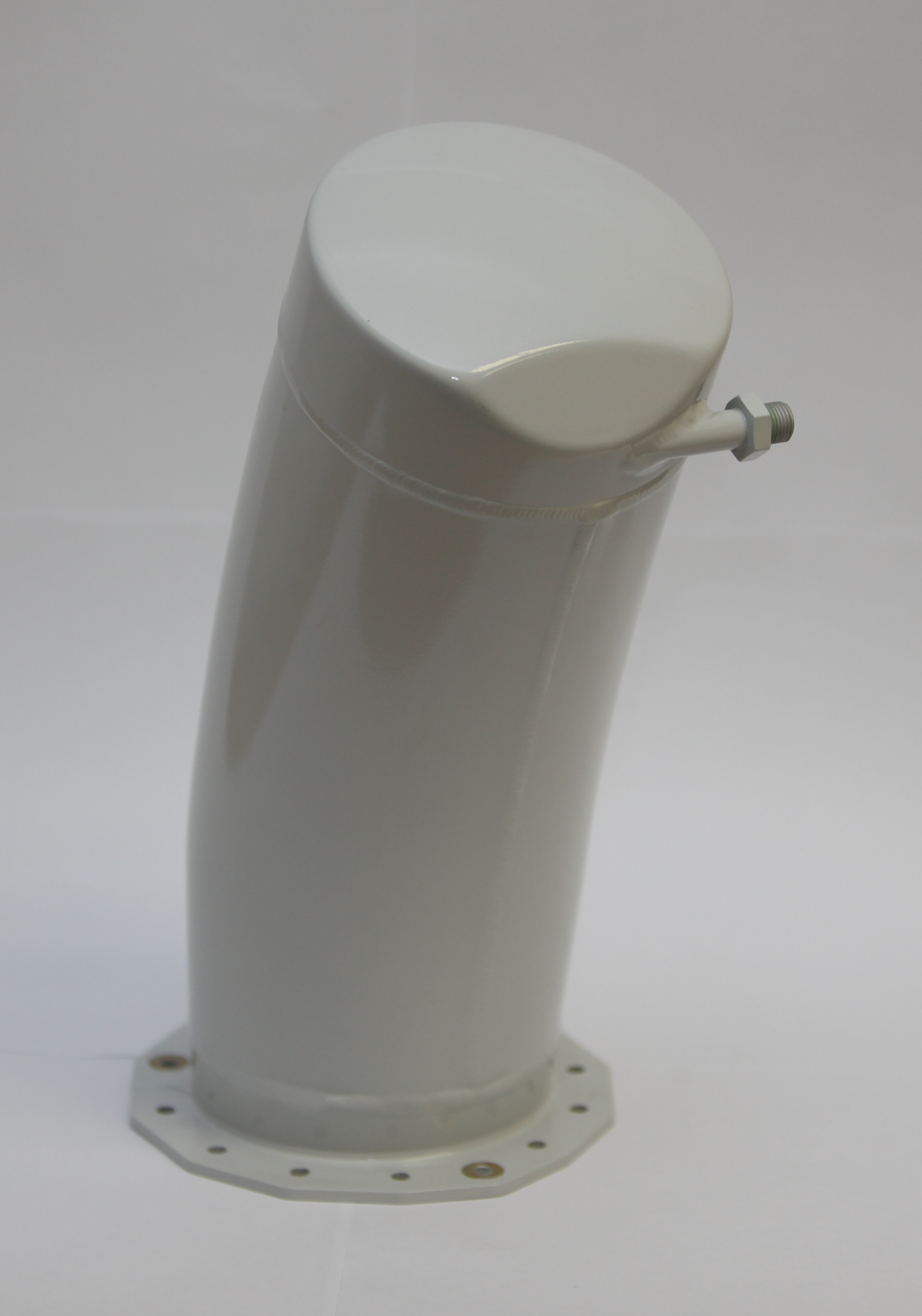
Mechanical assemblies and galley products manufactured by Aerosud.

By the mid-2000s, Aerosud had expanded its engineering activities across design, development, prototyping, manufacturing and in-service support. The company also reported investment in aerospace-skills development and industry-support initiatives.

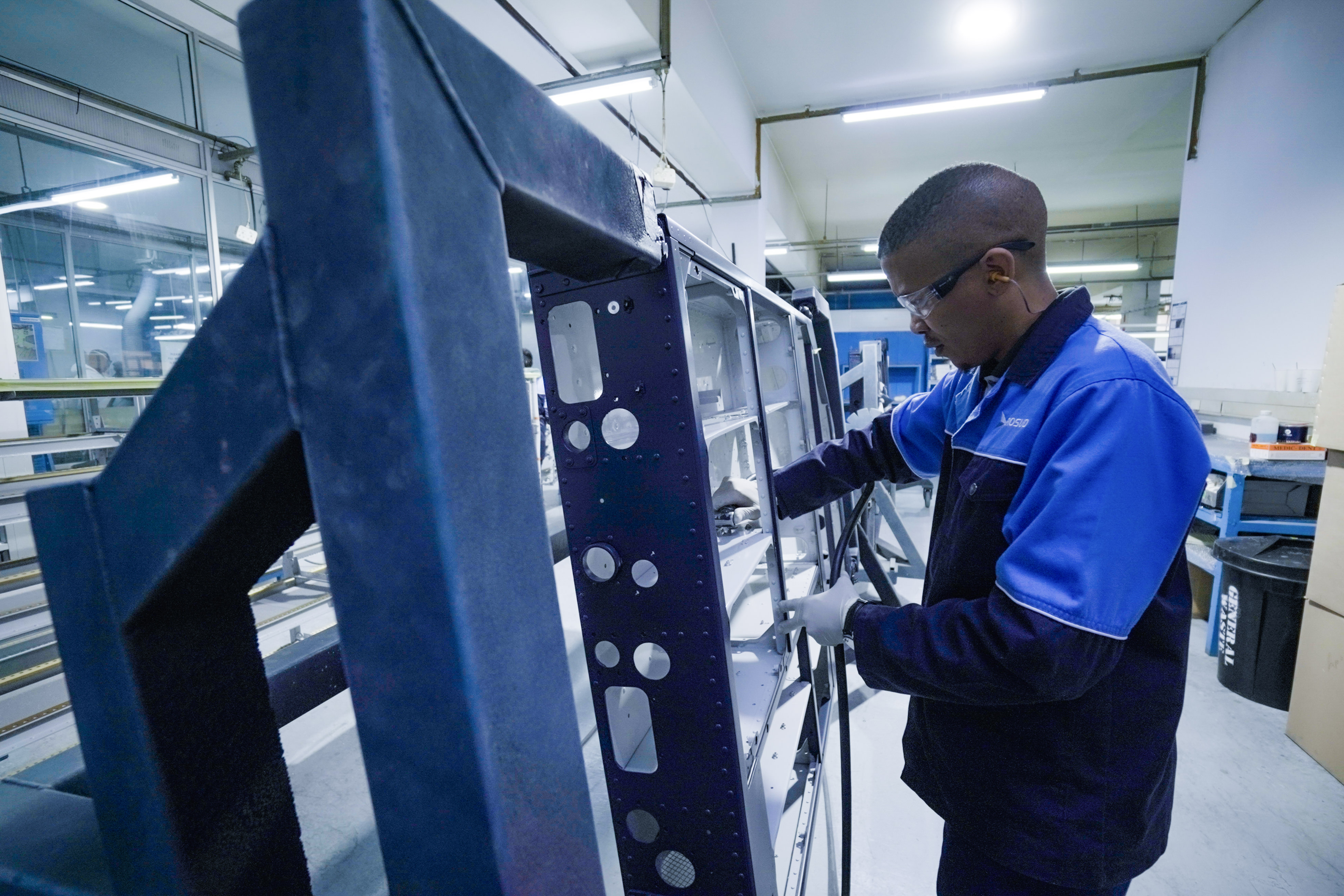
Mechanical assemblies and galley products manufactured by Aerosud.

In 2009, Aerosud began upgrading the South African Air Force’s Pilatus PC-7 Mk II trainer aircraft by installing a glass cockpit and modern avionics suite and removing obsolete equipment. In the same year, Paramount Group acquired a minority shareholding in Aerosud.

During the 2010s, Aerosud was also associated with the development of AHRLAC, a light attack and reconnaissance aircraft pursued through a joint venture with Paramount Group.

In 2014, Aerosud was restructured. The Industrial Development Corporation became a shareholder in Aerosud Holdings, while the group’s military activities were separated from the commercial aerospace business. Aerosud Aerospace was sold to Paramount Group and subsequently renamed Paramount Aerospace Systems. Following the restructuring, Aerosud’s operating focus shifted to commercial aerospace under Aerosud Aviation.

== Commercial aerospace development ==
In the mid-1990s, Aerosud diversified into commercial aviation, initially through the design and manufacture of galleys and other aircraft interior systems. Boeing contracted Aerosud to build aircraft parts and supported a South African production tie-up in the early 2000s.

Airbus later appointed Aerosud as a partner on A400M-related work packages, and Aerosud also secured Airbus A320 work. Over this period, Aerosud grew from a relatively small engineering business into a larger aerospace manufacturer.

Around 2000, Aerosud expanded its production capacity. Under a strategic partnership with Boeing, the company built a new manufacturing facility near Pretoria to support the production of aircraft cabin elements, interior composite parts and thermoplastic components.

During the 2000s, Aerosud reported further investment in manufacturing facilities, equipment and industrial capacity. Aerosud expanded its capability base with support from its investment partner, the Industrial Development Corporation.

In the early to mid-2000s, Aerosud broadened its customer base, particularly for metallic manufacturing, to include major tier-one suppliers such as Labinal, BAE Systems and Spirit AeroSystems UK. The company also developed aerospace welding capabilities and supplied thin-walled aluminium welded leading-edge wing components for the Airbus A320 family.

In 2006, Airbus appointed Aerosud as a risk-sharing partner for several Airbus A400M work packages, including interior components, monuments and wing tips. Aerosud’s participation continued after South Africa cancelled its A400M acquisition.

The 2014 restructuring marked a strategic shift toward commercial aerospace. With the military business unbundled, Aerosud Aviation focused on civil aircraft components, assemblies and industrialisation capability for aerospace customers.

== Technology and capabilities ==
In 2014, Aerosud acquired and further developed Cellular Core Technology, a patented tooling and production method for complex, multi-cell structural composite parts, according to the company profile cited in this article. Aerosud describes the technology as enabling complex composite structures to be produced in a single curing process.

Aerosud reported investment in additional facilities, equipment and production expansion programmes following the recovery in commercial aircraft demand after 2020.

Aerosud reports that it is accredited to AS9100/EN9100 and holds EASA Part 21G Production Organisation Approval for applicable aircraft cabin interior products. AS/EN 9100 is an aerospace quality-management standard published through the International Aerospace Quality Group, and EASA’s public production-organisation approval information describes Part 21 Subpart G approvals for production organisations. The company also reports Nadcap special-process accreditations in areas including welding, composites, surface treatment, heat treatment and non-destructive testing; Nadcap is administered by the Performance Review Institute as an aerospace critical-process accreditation programme.

Aerosud’s reported in-house manufacturing capabilities include metallic components and assemblies, welded structures, composite and thermoplastic parts, and aircraft interior and aerostructure assemblies.
