= Paramount Mwari =

Proposed COIN/light reconnaissance aircraft, South Africa

Mwari
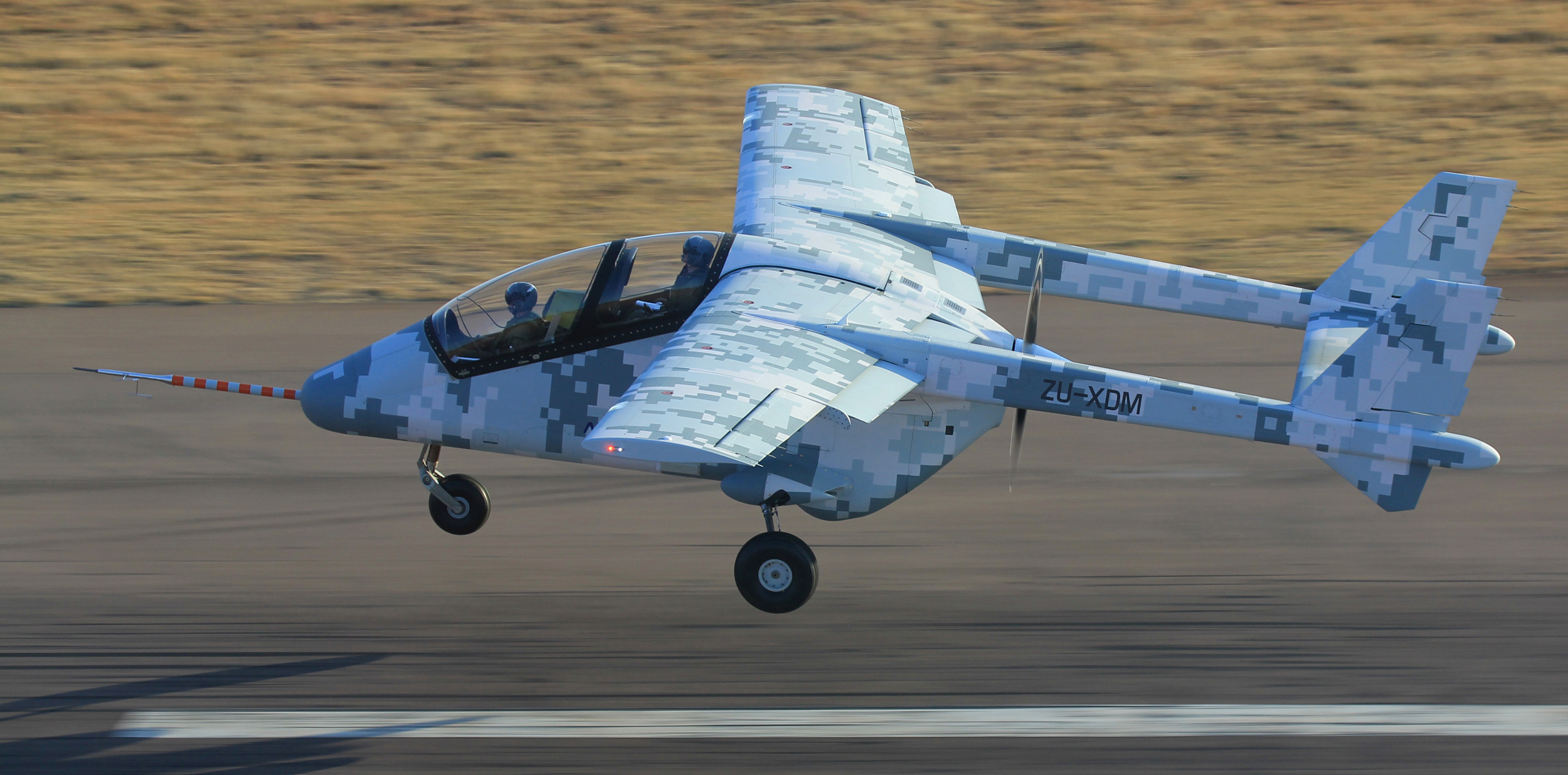
- The first prototype taking-off for a test flight

General information
- Type: Reconnaissance/Counter-insurgency
- National origin: South Africa
- Manufacturer: Paramount Aerospace Industries
- Status: In production.
- Number built: 5

History
- First flight: 26 July 2014

The Paramount Mwari, formerly known as AHRLAC (Advanced High Performance Reconnaissance Light Aircraft), is a South African light reconnaissance and counter-insurgency aircraft developed by Paramount Aerospace Industries, which started out as a joint venture between the Paramount Group and Aerosud. It is designed to perform as an inexpensive, more versatile substitute for unmanned aerial vehicles (UAVs) and modern light attack aircraft.

On 26 July 2014, the Ahrlac conducted its maiden flight; on 13 August 2014, the aircraft performed its first public flight display at Wonderboom Airport. Both armed and unarmed models of the aircraft are sold, as well as a potential unmanned version.

== Development ==
=== Origins ===
In 2009, Paramount Group began working on a new light turboprop-powered counter-insurgency aircraft. The design study examined a fixed-wing aircraft as an affordable platform for both civilian and military applications as an alternative to unmanned aerial vehicles (UAVs). The design of the proposed aircraft drew on the company's prior experience producing helicopters, and several design elements, such as the steep tandem canopy adopted, have been attributed to this source of inspiration; the aircraft is intended to act as a viable alternative for helicopters. It had been conceived as an affordable intelligence, surveillance, and reconnaissance (ISR) and light-strike platform, for which the developers had identified an increasing level of market demand for such an aircraft. Critically, it was recognised that jet-powered aircraft such as the Sukhoi Su-25 that were typically being used in this role were often overly-equipped and quite costly to operate in such capacities; thus a strong emphasis on low-cost operations was established early on.

In September 2011, design work on the Ahrlac project was formally initiated. According to its developers, the aircraft has been designed with the needs of First World customers in mind. It has also been claimed by its designers that the Ahrlac is to be the first fully indigenous military aircraft developed in Africa; additionally, it shall be the first South African military aircraft of any sort since the Denel Rooivalk attack helicopter, In 2011, the manufacturer stated that the price of the aircraft was projected at being under US$10 million per aircraft; the potential market for Ahrlac has been described as potentially being "in the hundreds or thousands of units".

According to aviation author Bill Sweetman, the Ahrlac is likely to come at least partially into competition with the Embraer EMB 314 Super Tucano and the Beechcraft T-6 Texan II; unlike either of those aircraft, it does not have any trainer heritage and thus is shaped distinctly differently, being more specialised to its low-intensity warfare role. In addition to existing manned products, the Ahrlac is intended to compete with UAVs in the marketplace; Paramount claims that the aircraft will be cheaper to acquire and operate than UAVs since the manned models of the Ahrlac shall not need the expensive subsystems required for the remote control of unmanned aircraft.

In 2011, a full-scale mockup of the Ahrlac was constructed, alongside a quarter-scale flight-capable model that was later used for a total of 80 test flights. The first full-scale prototype, designated as the Experimental Demonstrator (XDM), was completed using design for manufacture technology, which allowed for jigless construction to be performed, thus producing both time and cost savings. Of the aircraft's 6,000 components, 98 per cent had been designed using CATIA software and were domestically manufactured. In May 2014, the flight test program commenced at Wonderboom Airport near Pretoria, the first prototype having been moved there from Aerosud's facility in Centurion, Gauteng. In July 2014, the ground test phase was reportedly completed.

=== Flight testing ===
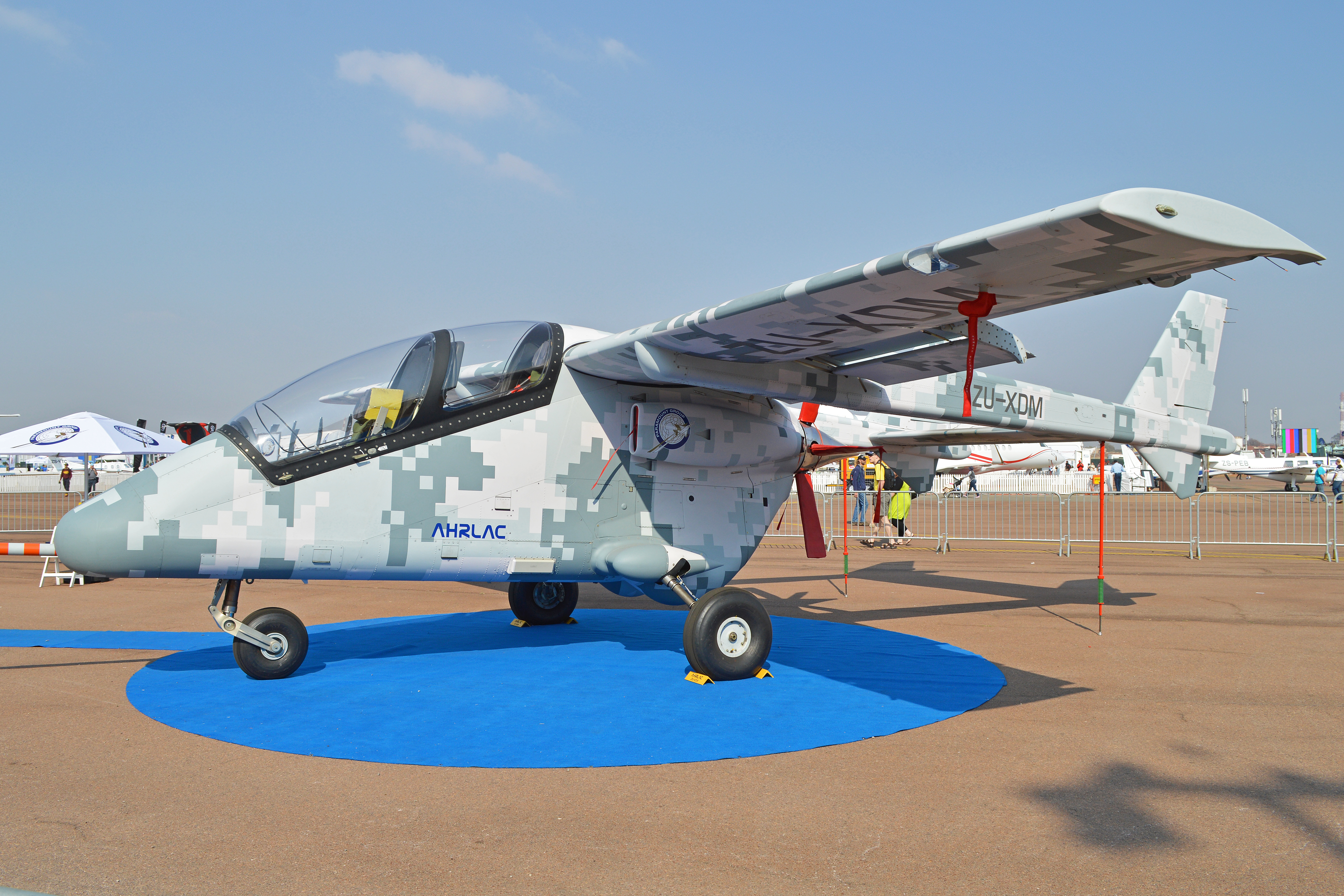
Ahrlac on static display at Waterkloof AFB during the 2014 African Aerospace & Defence airshow

On 26 July 2014, the first Ahrlac prototype conducted its maiden flight from Wonderboom. It was initially deployed on a 20-hour flight test program to contrast computer simulations against data from the prototype's real-world flight performance; during each of these flights, telemetry data was gathered inflight by a specially-equipped Pilatus PC-12 chase plane. The initial prototype is to be used to prove the flight characteristics and performance of the aircraft, while the second prototype, designated as the Advanced Demonstrator (ADM), shall be for testing armaments and mission systems. Advanced flight testing is to be carried out for the Ahrlac's full lifecycle as well.

By February 2015, the first prototype had completed 65 hours of incident-free flying; as a result, the test program proceeded to the next phase, under which the flight envelope was progressively expanded to explore and evaluate its handling, center of gravity, flight performance, airframe qualities, and rough field capabilities. According to Paramount, several prospective customers had shown interest in the aircraft, particularly from the Middle East; the construction of the second prototype was also underway and had been proceeding smoothly so far. The initial prototype is claimed to have "matched all out initial predictions very closely".

By September 2016, the prototype had accumulated 250 flying hours during tests, as well as a total of four deployments to the South African border and to neighbouring Botswana for the purpose of operationally representative trials. An improvised trial flight had also been conducted during an outbreak of civil unrest in South Africa. By September 2016, the developers were in the process of building a new assembly line at Wonderboom, this facility is expected to produce the initial two production aircraft in 2017. The Wonderboom factory is to be capable of producing up to two aircraft per month; it is reportedly readily expandable to double its current size, dependent on customer demand.

=== Further development ===
In 2014, the developers revealed that, in addition to the previously-announced crewed model of the Ahrlac, they were also in the process of developing an unmanned variant as well. According to Janes, the unmanned model of the Ahrlac had its origins in the quarter-scale model that had been produced for flight testing purposes, which had revealed favourable tendencies towards such use. By September 2014, a pair of prototype unmanned vehicles, which had received the name "Mwari", had been produced. The Mwari UAV is considerably smaller than the manned Ahrlac counterpart, possessing a reduced flight endurance of only 4 hours along with a sensor turret in the nose. The UAV was renamed "Mwewe", as the Mwari name is used for an armed version of the full scale manned Ahrlac.

In March 2016, American aerospace firm Boeing announced that it had entered into a development partnership with Paramount with the aim of producing a militarized version of the Ahrlac. Under this agreement, Boeing said it would develop an integrated mission system to provide the Ahrlac with intelligence, surveillance and reconnaissance (ISR) and weapons system capabilities. The militarized version of the Ahrlac shall be marketed under the name "Mwari".

In February 2018, an announcement was made that the improved AHRLAC design will be marketed in the USA under the name "Bronco II". In May 2020, BRONCO II, Paramount Group's Americanized variant of the AHRLAC, in partnership with Leidos and Vertex Aerospace, offered the light attack and surveillance aircraft to U.S. Special Operations Command, or SOCOM, for its Armed Overwatch program.

== Sales ==
Paramount announced that it had sold a total of nine aircraft to two unnamed countries and that the first would be delivered immediately; the announcement was made at Africa Aerospace and Defence show on 21 September 2022. This marks the first sale of the aircraft and South Africa's first sale of a fixed-wing aircraft in 20 years.Since then, two aircraft have been delivered to the Albanian Air Force; FA-401 and FA-402.

=== Financial issues and Business Rescue ===
As of 28 February 2019, the AHRLAC program has been placed into business rescue with the Wonderboom factory being shut down and all 140 employees sent home. In August 2019, a business rescue plan was announced for AHRLAC, with Paramount taking full control of the Aerospace Development Corporation (ADC) and its subsidiaries, according to the proposition. In September 2020, ADC stated that production of the Ahrlac had restarted.

=== Foreign Sales ===
The company claims to have made multiple sales of nine aircraft to two unnamed air forces. The first example was delivered on 23 September to an unnamed air force. A total of nine Mwari aircraft are on order. Paramount Aerospace Industries claims that they can build three a year or five if demand requires more aircraft.

In September 2023, the Democratic Republic of Congo ordered "several" aircraft. Mozambique already has some operational.

== Design ==
The Ahrlac features a twin-boom, single-pusher-engine, high-mounted forward-swept wing configuration, giving the aircraft an unconventional external appearance and providing for excellent external visibility. It is powered by a single Pratt & Whitney Canada PT6A turboprop engine; it has a top speed of 310 mph, roughly double that of most helicopters and similar to larger military UAVs such as the General Atomics MQ-9 Reaper, along with a flight endurance of seven hours. It is flown by a crew of two, who are seated in tandem configuration, both being provided with Martin-Baker ejection seats and HOTAS (hands on stick-and-throttle) control functionality. The narrow airframe is composed of a combination of metal and composite construction and is designed to provide maximum crew visibility. The aircraft overall is claimed to be inexpensive and easy to manufacture, AHRLAC's CEO, Dr Paul Potgieter, has contrasted the ease of assembly to that of a Meccano set. The Ahrlac has been designed to be capable of operating from austere runways and rough fields; it also possesses STOL (Short Take Off/Landing) and rapid deployment capabilities.

It has been envisioned that the aircraft shall perform various mission roles, including intelligence, surveillance, target acquisition, and reconnaissance (ISTAR) and counter-insurgency missions; coastal patrol, anti-smuggling and disaster relief capabilities are also projected mission profiles. In order for the Ahrlac to effectively engage in the diverse range of missions it is capable of, it features a reconfigurable nose, a large mission bay for avionics beneath the two-person cockpit, and the lower fuselage consists of a variety of interchangeable conformal modular units. These modules allow the aircraft to be outfitted with a variety of sensor systems such as infrared and optical cameras, synthetic aperture radar, electronic intelligence gathering and various electronic warfare packages. Additionally, electro-optical turrets can be installed both on the nose and belly of the aircraft. The avionics employ an open architecture, further adding to the ease of adding, upgrading and swapping components and systems.

The armed Mwari version is designed to carry a single 20 mm cannon, which is internally mounted into the fuselage. Additionally, it is fitted with either four or six hardpoints for carrying weapons mounted under the wings, including rocket pods, unguided bombs, and various air-to-surface and air-to-air missiles. Armour for the aircraft is also modular and can be added or removed entirely dependent on the mission requirements.

Conformal fuel tanks carried underneath the tail booms have also been offered as an option for the type; when equipped with external fuel tanks, the Ahrlac is capable of a 2,000 nm ferry range. Armed Mwari models are presented as being ideal for low-intensity warfare, such as for combat against insurgents and armed criminal elements, as well as patrol work performed by civilian border guard and law enforcement agencies.

== Specifications ==
Three-view of the Ahrlac

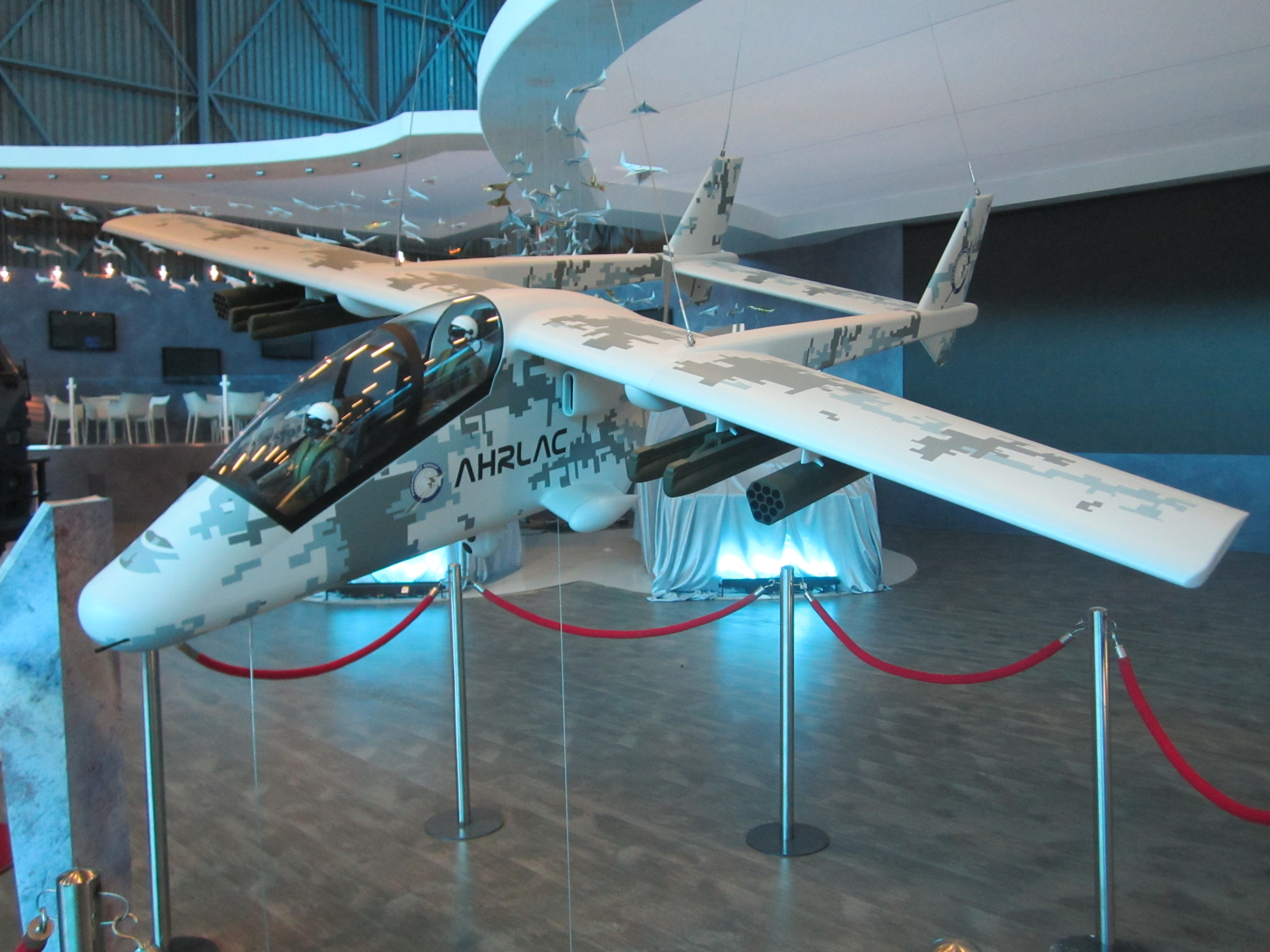
AHRLAC model at AAD2012

Data from AW&ST, AHRLAC official site

General characteristics

- Crew: two (pilot, copilot/observer)
- Length: 10.3 m (34 ft 0 in)
- Wingspan: 11.9 m (39 ft 0 in)
- Height: 4.0 m (13 ft 0 in)
- Empty weight: 2,000 kg (4,400 lb)
- Max takeoff weight: 3,800 kg (8,400 lb)
- Powerplant: 1 × Pratt & Whitney Canada PT6A-66 turboprop, 710 kW (950 shp)

Performance

- Maximum speed: 504 km/h (313 mph, 272 kn)
- Range: 2,130 km (1,325 mi, 1,150 nmi)
- Endurance: 7–10 hrs
- Service ceiling: 9,450 m (31,000 ft)
- Take-off distance: 550 metres (1,800 ft) with full payload

Armament

- Guns: GI-2 20 mm cannon
- Hardpoints: 6 , with provisions to carry combinations of:
  - Missiles: Mokopa anti-tank guided missiles (ATGM),
  - Bombs: Mk 81 250 lb. or Mk 82 500 lb. general-purpose bombs

== See also ==
Aircraft of comparable role, configuration, and era

- North American Rockwell OV-10 Bronco
- Northrop Grumman Firebird

Related lists

- List of twin-boom aircraft
