= Grand Sky =

UAS-specific business and aviation park in North Dakota, USA.

Grand Sky is a UAS (unmanned aerial systems)-specific business and aviation park located at Grand Forks Air Force Base near Grand Forks, North Dakota. A groundbreaking for the development was held in September 2015, making it the first UAS business and aviation park in the U.S. The park consists of 217 acres and includes access to the Grand Forks Air Force Base runway for large UAS flights.

== Tenants ==
Initial tenants at Grand Sky include General Atomics Aeronautical Systems and Northrop Grumman. Northrop Grumman was the first tenant to begin construction at the park. The company broke ground for a 36,000-square-foot facility in October 2015 to be used for research, training and operations. Northrop Grumman makes the Global Hawk, a large UAS that is also flown by the military at Grand Forks Air Force Base.

General Atomics Aeronautical Systems conducted the first large UAS flight at the park, a launch and recovery of a Predator A aircraft, in July 2016. The company operates a UAS Flight Training Academy at the park and graduated its first class of aircrews on Aug. 12, 2016.

== Future development ==
In December 2016, Grand Forks-based EdgeData LLC signed a letter of intent to construct a 16,000-square-foot data center at Grand Sky which will offer data storage for tenants at the park. Data collection and distribution is expected to be a significant factor in the commercial use of UAS.

Also in December 2016, the Federal Aviation Administration granted approval to the Northern Plains UAS Test Site to conduct beyond visual line of sight (BVLOS) flights from Grand Sky. It is the first location in the U.S. to receive approval for BVLOS flights and allows for greater support of testing, development and evaluation of UAS technologies.
