= Museum of the Military Police of the state of São Paulo =

Museum in São Paulo, Brazil

Museum of the Military Police of the State of São Paulo
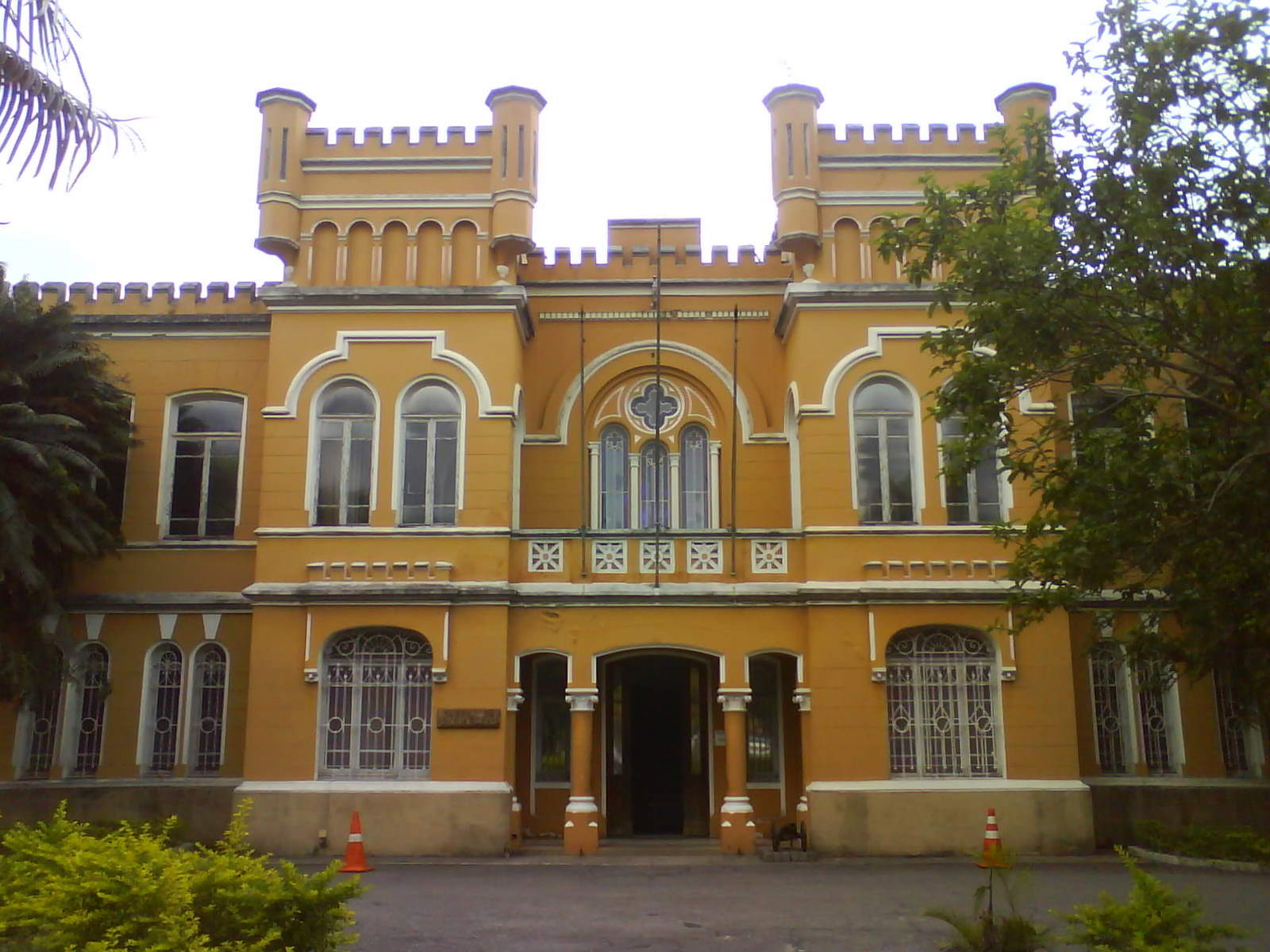
- Type: Historical, military
- Inauguration: 1958
- Director: Col. PM Galdino Vieira da Silva Neto
- Website: http://museupoliciamilitar.com.br
- Country: Brazil
- City: São Paulo
- Coordinates: 23°31′54″S 46°37′44″W

The Museum of the Military Police of the State of São Paulo (Portuguese: Museu da Polícia Militar do Estado de São Paulo) is the museum responsible for the conservation, study, and exhibition of the material heritage related to the history and memory of the Military Police of the State of São Paulo (PMESP) and the corporations that preceded it. It was founded by Professor Vinício Stein Campos on 11 August 1958, as a historical and pedagogical museum, and has been linked to the Secretariat of Public Security of the State of São Paulo since 1976. It is located in the district of Bom Retiro, in São Paulo's capital, in the former headquarters of the Military Hospital of the Public Forces, a building designed by Ramos de Azevedo in 1896.

The museum has a collection of approximately 10,000 items, including collections of uniforms, badges, weapons, medals, furniture, vehicles, and campaign materials, as well as objects related to the 1932 Constitutionalist Revolution. It maintains a library with approximately 8,000 titles and the Historical Archive of the Military Police Museum, both available for consultation.

== History ==
The Military Police Museum of the State of São Paulo was created on 11 August 1958, by the State Education Secretariat, during the government of Jânio Quadros, through State Decree no. 33.392, confirmed by State Law no. 7.872 of 3 April 1963. The institution, idealized by Professor Vinício Stein Campos, director of the Historical Museums Service, was then called "Military Museum of São Paulo" and was subordinated to the State Education Secretariat. Its objective was to preserve the memory of the Public Forces and the Armed Forces in the history of São Paulo. On 27 April 1976, during the administration of Paulo Egydio Martins, the museum was transferred to the Secretariat of Public Security, subordinated directly to the Military Police of the State of São Paulo.

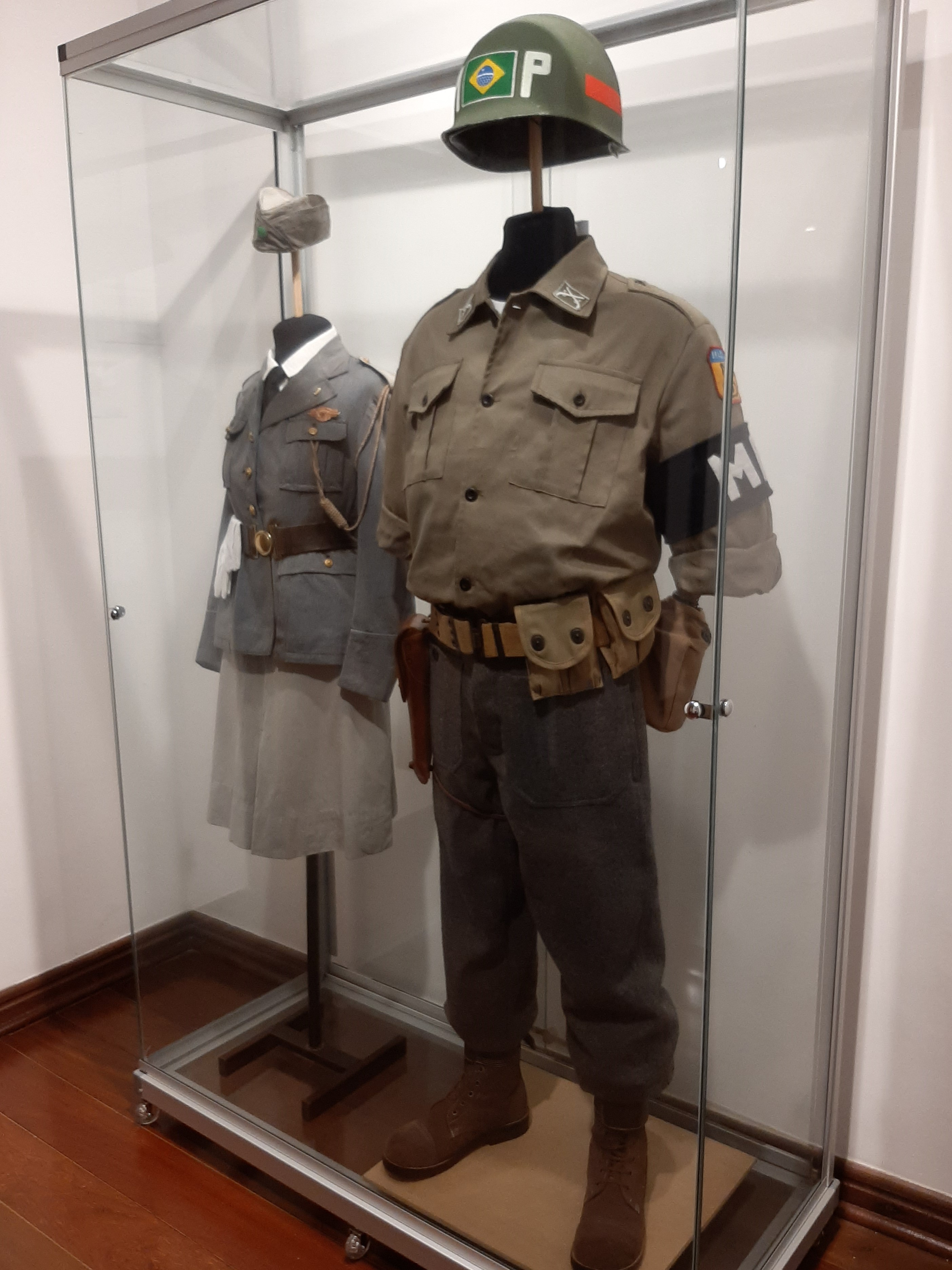
Display case showing the uniforms of the participation of São Paulo's police forces in World War II.

At the time of the transfer, a new project for the museum was developed for the institution, which now aims at gathering, preserving, cataloging, and exhibiting historical material related to Brazil's military police forces and, in particular, to the State of São Paulo Military Police and its predecessor corporations, such as the State Public Forces and the São Paulo Civil Guard, as well as other extinct corporations, such as the Maritime and Air Police, the Women's Police, the Night Guard, and the Special Police Division. On 25 July 1994, the museum gained its current name and had its purposes redefined.

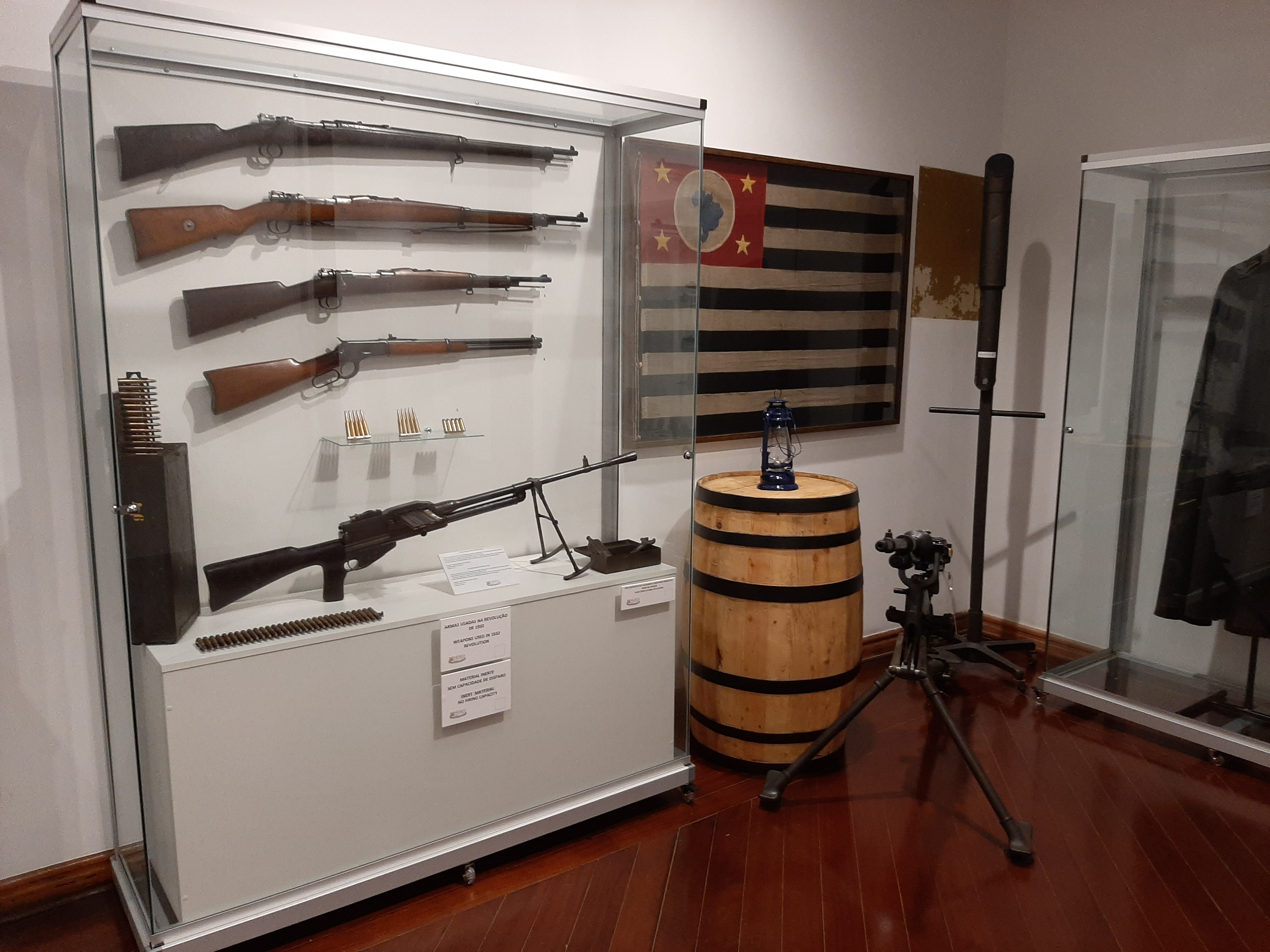
Permanent exhibition room of the museum.

Activities inherent to the museum's objectives are the organization of didactic exhibitions of the collection, the promotion of courses, lectures, symposia, and other cultural events related to the history of Brazilian military and police forces. The museum maintains exchanges with similar institutions, and pieces from the collection have already been lent for temporary exhibitions at the Museu Histórico Pedagógico Voluntários da Pátria de Araraquara (exhibit Revolução Constitucionalista de 1932) and at the Museu do Ipiranga, in São Paulo (exhibits Tirando o Quepe; A Cidade que Virou o Século: São Paulo 1870/1918, A Missão Francesa na Força Pública de São Paulo de 1906).

Cultural and educational activities include guided visits for museologists, teachers, students, senior citizens visitors, and institutional participation in lectures by museology professionals. The museum's current director is Colonel PM Galdino Vieira da Silva Neto, a museology specialist who took over the position in 2016.

The museum was closed for renovations and was reopened on 24 February 2017.

== Building ==
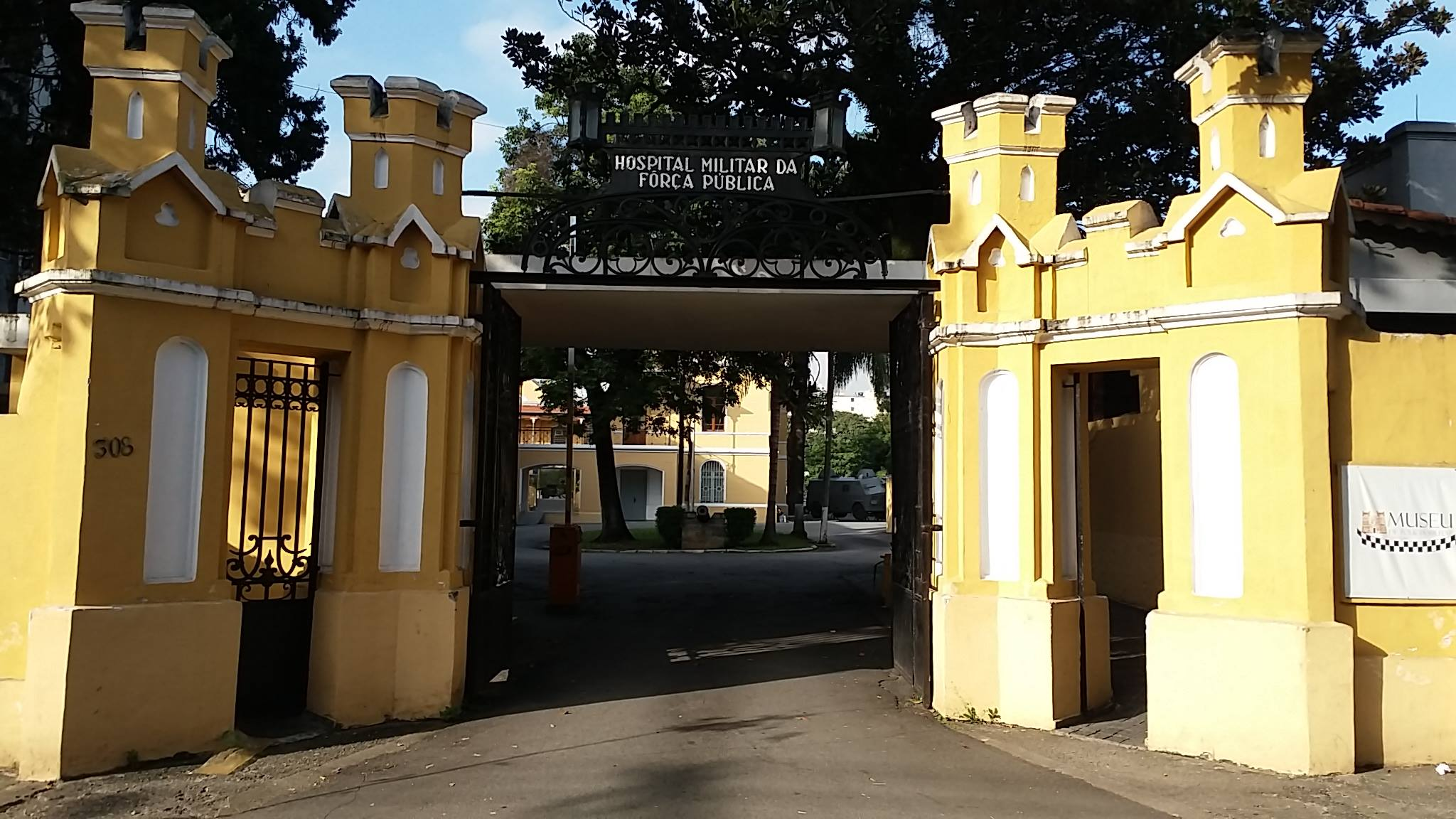
Museum entrance still preserving the identification of "Hospital Militar da Força Pública" ("Military Hospital of the Public Forces").

The museum is housed in a small building of 5,155 square feet (478.9 square metres)|, designed by Ramos de Azevedo in 1896 to house the now-defunct Military Hospital of the Public Forces. This building is inserted in a complex of military buildings erected in the Bairro da Luz neighborhood, clustered around the former Permanentes Headquarters, the current headquarters of the 1st Shock Police Battalion (known as the "Tobias de Aguiar Battalion"), also designed by Ramos de Azevedo and built between 1887 and 1892. Due to space limitations, only a small portion of the collection (approximately 4%) can be seen in permanent exhibitions.

The building still preserves many of its original features. Designed in an eclectic style, with clear reminiscences of military architecture, the building has large windows and doors made with Scots pine, a ceiling height of over 14 feet (4.3 meters), a Carrara marble staircase, French stained glass windows, and Portuguese cement tiles. The exhibition rooms occupy 1,132 square feet (105.2 square metres) and the library 985 square feet (91.5 square metres). The rest of the space is occupied by administrative areas. The museum also has a shed of 7,196 square feet (668.5 square metres), where the large objects of the collection and most of the collection of vehicles are stored.

== Collections ==
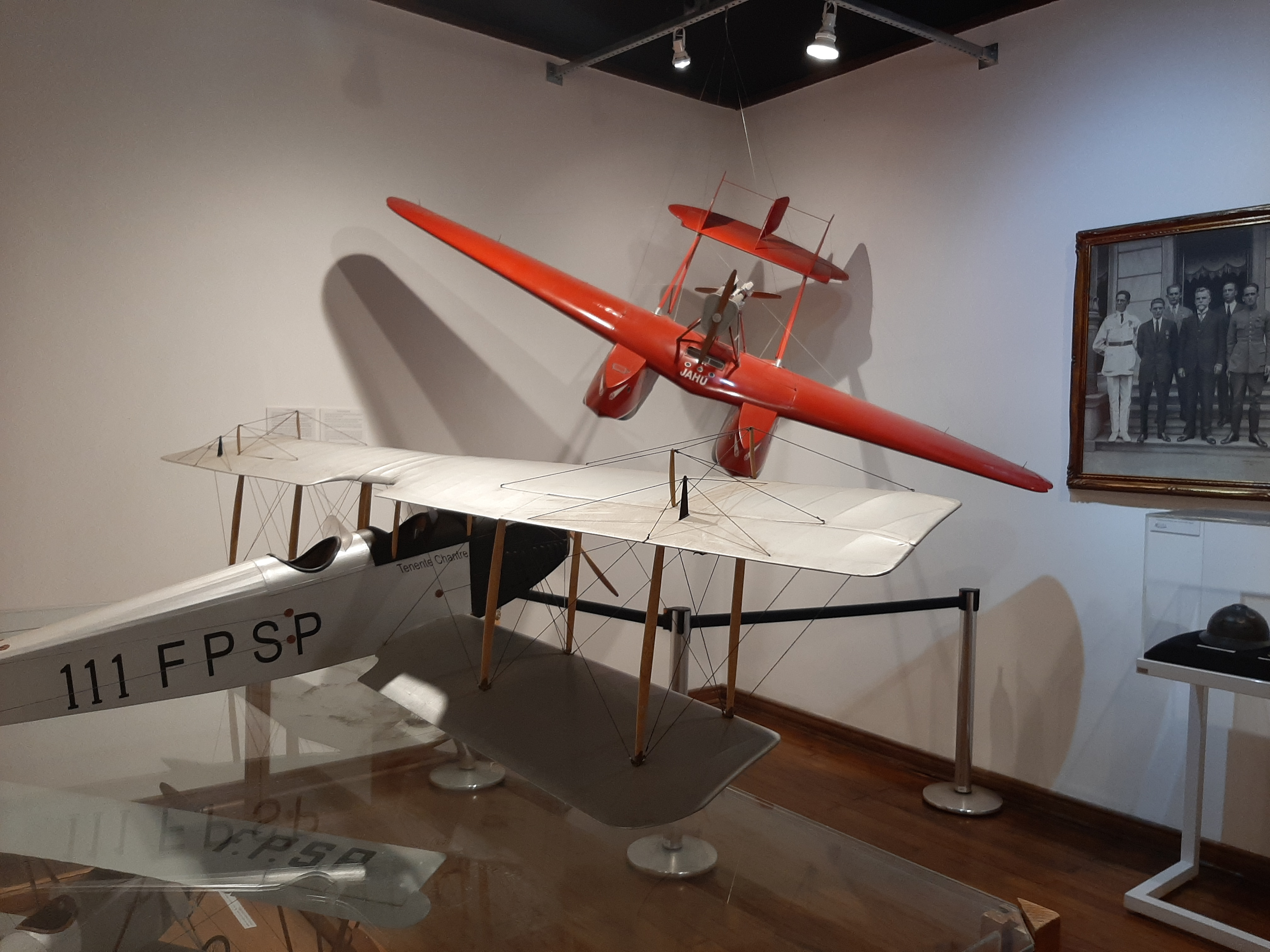
São Paulo State Historic Aviation Exhibition.

=== Museum Collection ===
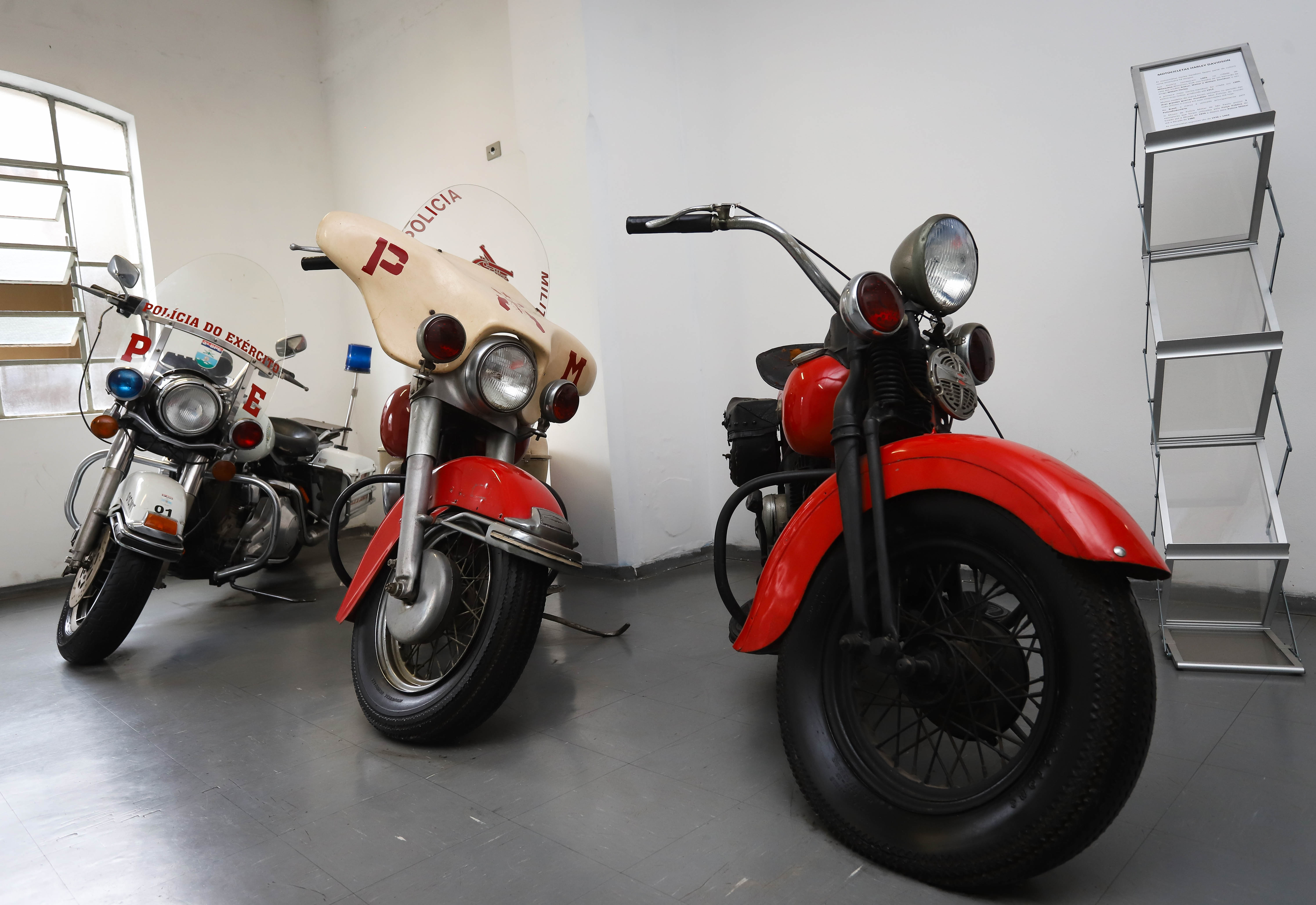
In the center, a Harley-Davidson motorcycle, with a 1200-cylinder engine, manufactured in 1969 in the United States. It was used by the São Paulo Military Police Escort Squad.

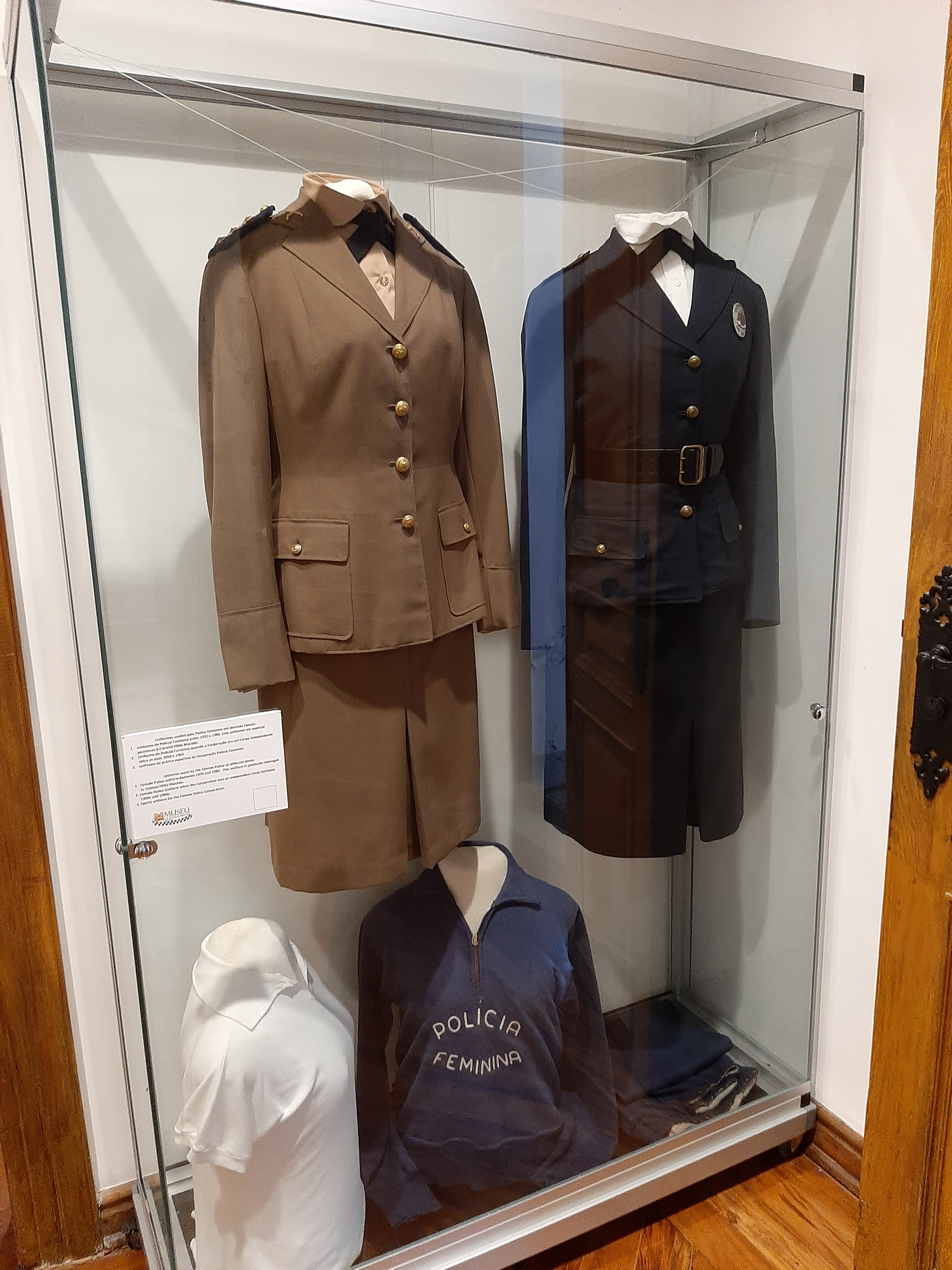
Part of the Exhibition about the São Paulo Women's Police, an independent corporation that existed between 1956 and 1966.

The museum's collection is made up of approximately 10,000 pieces, of varying natures, periods, and functions. It was formed through donations, exchanges, and transfers from other museums. Systematic collection of goods has taken place since 1976, and there are few items collected before that. It is composed of objects related to the Military Police of the State of São Paulo and to the corporations that preceded it, or to extinct corporations and institutions from other states in Brazil and other countries. The collection includes large collections of uniforms, covers, and accessories (caps, helmets, shoes, balaclavas, badges, epaulets, plaques, etc.) armory (cold weapons and firearms), medals, decorations, command insignia, furniture, flags, pennants, banners, sports trophies, campaign materials, communication and war operation equipment, maps, photographs, historical documents, etc. The collections of objects related to the Constitutionalist Revolution and vehicles, including working animal transportation, are a highlight.

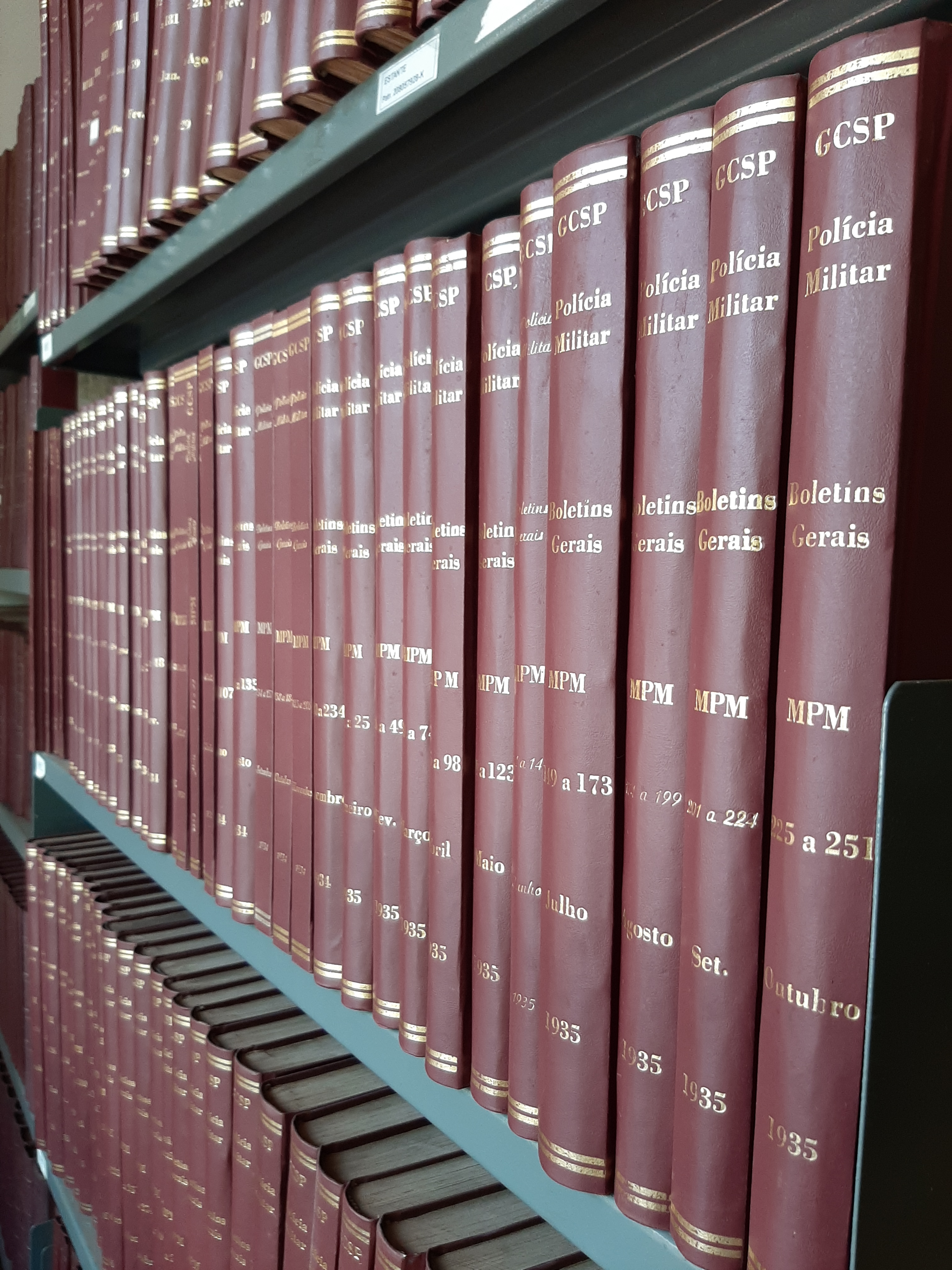
Detail of the Museum of the Military Police of the State of São Paulo's Library.

=== Library ===
The museum's library is specialized in universal, Brazilian, São Paulo, and Military Police history, with a predominance of themes concerning the historiography of police corporations, armed forces, wars, and revolutions, as well as technical police and military literature and technical literature to support museum activities. It also keeps dissertations and undergraduate theses related to the above-mentioned subjects. The library contains approximately 8,000 titles. The periodical collection comprises around 12,000 copies of current or extinct publications, of military corporations from all over Brazil, the complete collections of the General Bulletins of the Public Force, the Civil Guard, and the current Military Police. It also preserves a collection of approximately 30,000 photographs, 20,000 negatives, and 20,000 slides.

=== Historical Archives of the Military Police Museum ===
The Historical Archives of the Military Police Museum is composed of several archival funds related to the history of the Military Police and personal documents (letters, manuscripts, declarations, certificates, wills, etc.) of military personalities, totaling 6,115 linear feet (1,864 meters) of documentation. Highlights are the documents related to the colonial and imperial periods, the manuals of the French Mission in the Public Forces and the documents from the revolutions of 1924, 1930, and 1932.

== See also ==
- Civil Police Museum of the State of São Paulo
- Military Police of the State of São Paulo

== Bibliography ==
- Comissão de Patrimônio Cultural da USP (2000). Guia de Museus Brasileiros (in Portuguese). São Paulo: EDUSP. pp. 453–454.
