= Civil Police Museum of the State of São Paulo =

Museum in São Paulo, Brazil

- Museu da Polícia Civil do Estado de São Paulo
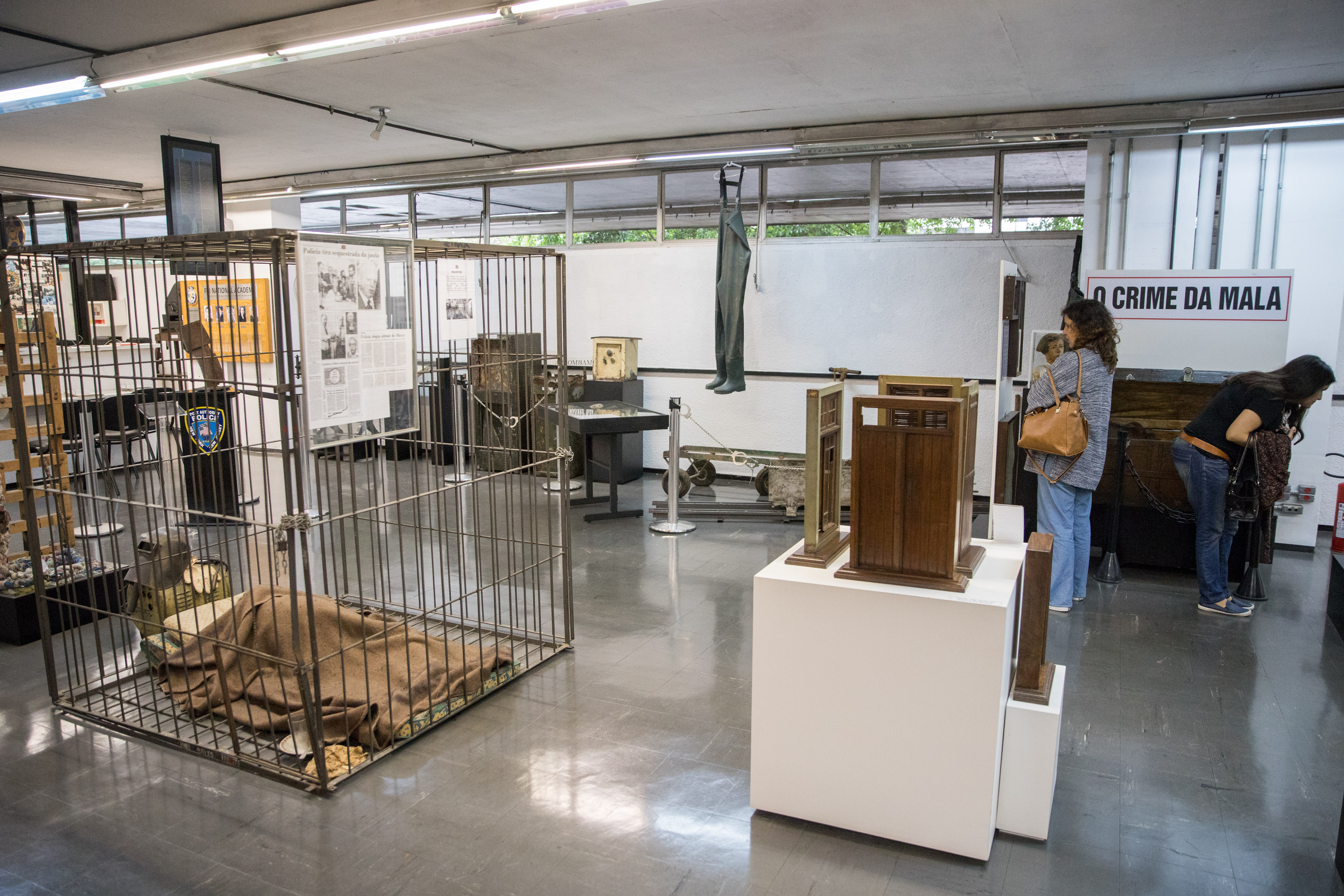

- Location within São Paulo Location within Brazil
- Established: 1930; 96 years ago
- Location: São Paulo, São Paulo; Brazil
- Coordinates: 23°33′58.755″S 46°42′46.746″W

The Civil Police Museum of the State of São Paulo (Portuguese: Museu da Polícia Civil do Estado de São Paulo), also known as the Crime Museum of the Civil Police of the State of São Paulo (Museu do Crime da Polícia Civil do Estado de São Paulo), is a public institution located in University City, in the Butantã neighborhood, on the west side of the city of São Paulo. Its purpose is to preserve a collection composed of documents from police investigations, such as the different weapons used by civilians, typical jailhouse tattoos, traffic tragedies, objects used in crimes and all other situations involving criminality in São Paulo from the 20th century onwards. The museum is located on Campus I of the Dr. Coriolano Nogueira Cobra Police Academy (Acadepol) and its collection contains around 3,000 items.

Founded in 1927, it was initially named the Museum of Police Technique and Crime History, and on April 23, 1930, by Decree No. 4.715, the institution was legally established. Initially, it was only an object of study for Acadepol students, but it became accessible to the entire population, with free admission, in 1952.

== History ==
The Civil Police of the State of São Paulo was created in 1841 with the purpose of executing the orders of the Judiciary, as well as taking care of all criminal offenses that were not military or committed against the Union. Along with it, also in 1841, the Department of Justice Affairs was established to take care of matters relating to civil and criminal justice, public safety, reviewing arrests and issuing decrees in cases for which it was responsible.

During the development of the Civil Police, some personalities were outstanding, such as José Cardoso de Almeida, who became chief of police right from the start and gained notoriety by promoting the structuring of the organization, with the aim of transforming the profession into something more serious and recognized, with possible career advancement and higher pay. Three other names of great importance during this initial period were Jorge Tibiriçá, president of the state of São Paulo, who in 1905 launched José Cardoso's demands; Antônio de Godói, a police delegate who developed and consolidated the idea of creating careers; and Washington Luís Pereira de Sousa, Secretary of Justice and responsible for the first steps towards the desired "Career Civil Police of the State of São Paulo".

The Police School, currently called the Dr. Coriolano Nogueira Cobra Police Academy (Acadepol), is the place where civilians are trained. It is located in a building within the University City along with the Civil Police Museum, created in 1927 as a way of honoring and teaching about the changes and evolutions that have occurred since the beginning of the formation of the organization up to the present day. On April 23, 1930, the museum was legally recognized by Decree No. 4.715, and on August 26, 2005, by Decree No. 49.930, it became an independent unit.

Since its existence, the museum has received two significant recognitions. In 1929, two years after its creation, it was included by USP's Cultural Heritage Database Team in the Guide to Brazilian Museums, and displayed in the "Museums of the Southeast Region" section for interested visitors. Then, in 2006, its assets were included in the National Institute of Historical and Artistic Heritage (IPHAN), more precisely in the National Museum Register.

== Collection ==
The museum's collection features typical objects used by civil police officers in the past, such as different types of weapons, and preserved documents and photos about the history of the organization. All of the instruments presented are focused on further study of police investigations and crimes that have affected Brazil. Famous cases such as the Suitcase Crime, Chico Picadinho and the Park Maniac also feature in the site's collection, which has approximately 3,000 items - including old vehicles, drug exhibits, pieces from traffic accidents, fires, gun deaths, gambling machines, lie detectors, among others - that constitute the criminalistics and criminology archive.

Right at the entrance to the museum, there is a representation of a police officer's desk used at the time. Photos of crimes and objects related to the daily life of the São Paulo police are also on display for visitors to see, as well as simulated cases of murder and rape.

=== The Suitcase Crime ===
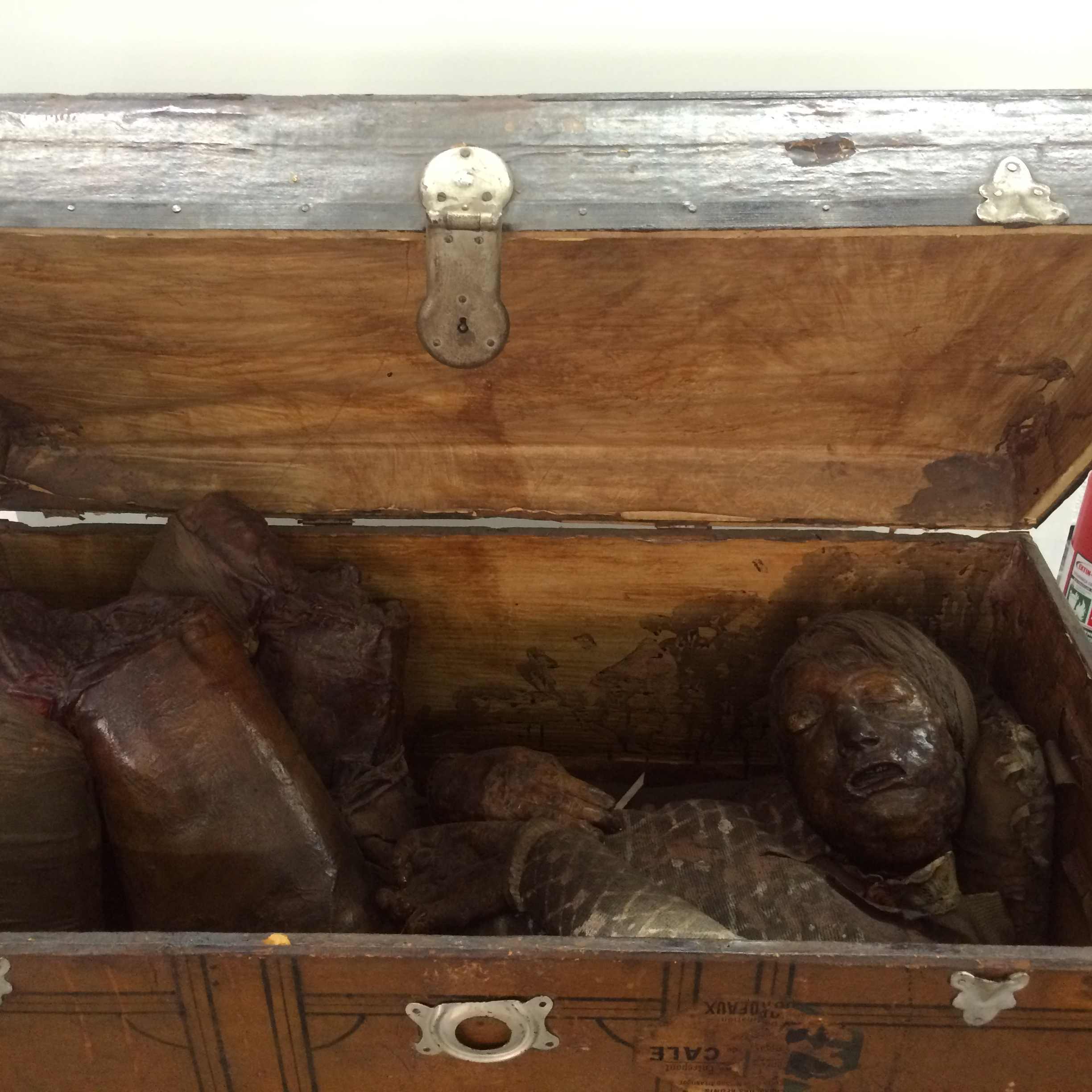
The museum's main piece.

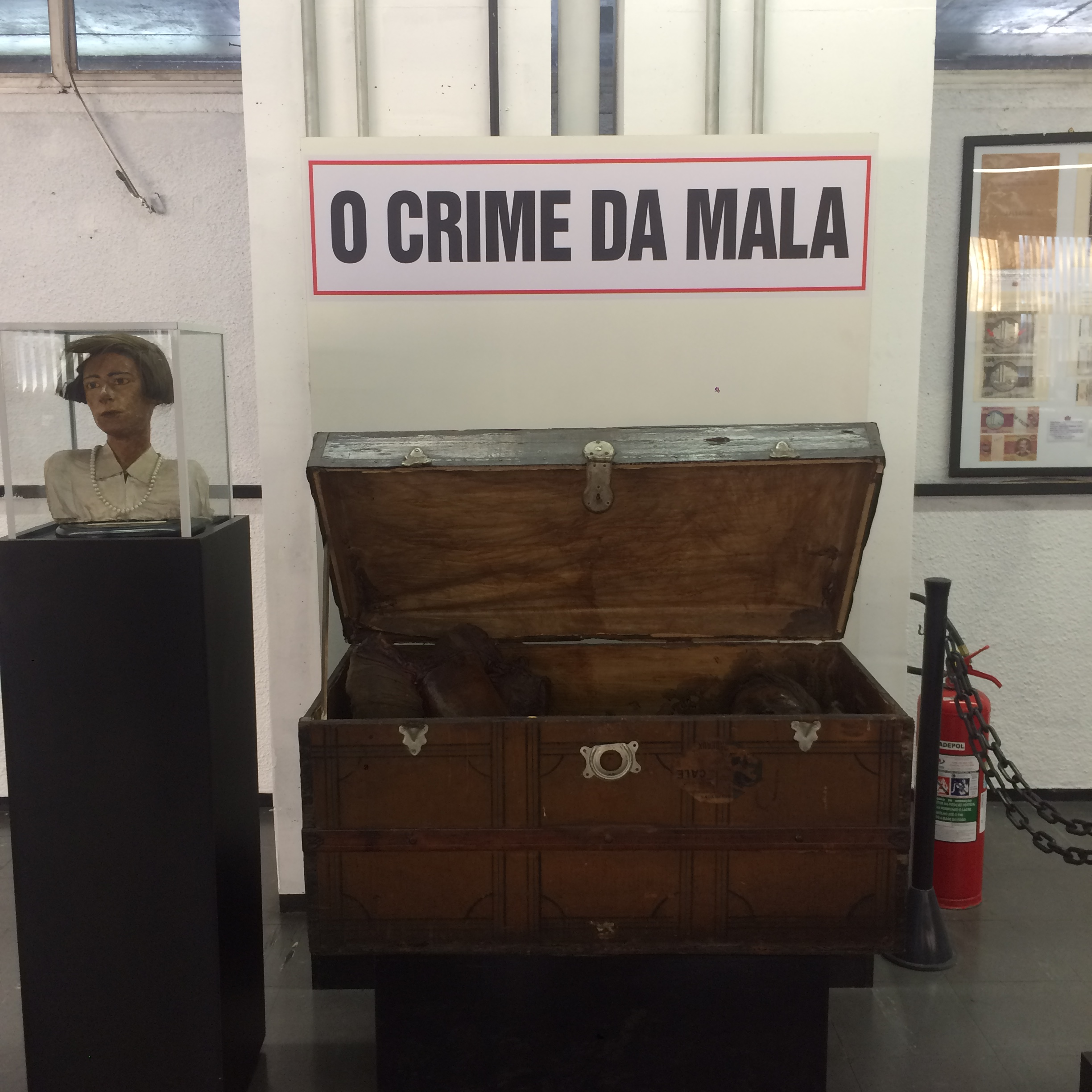
The museum's main piece.

One of the main pieces in the collection is the original trunk used in the Suitcase Crime, a case that covered several Brazilian newspapers in 1928. On October 5, a trunk-shaped suitcase was found in the Port of Santos covered in blood with a mutilated female body inside; consequently, the case became known as the "Crime da Mala" (English: "Crime of the Suitcase").

At the time, Italian immigrant Giusepe Pistone was planning a scam on his distant relative, a wine businessman in São Paulo. His wife, Argentinian Maria Féa, was suspicious of him, as he had been convicted of embezzlement, and decided to write to her mother about her Pistone's possible intentions. When he found the letter, he decided to suffocate Maria Féa, who was pregnant, on October 4 in order to avoid prosecution. Police investigators found her body dismembered by a knife and covered in rice powder to avoid the smell. In 1944, after being sentenced to 31 years in prison, Giuseppe Pistone was released with a pardon granted by President Getúlio Vargas. At the Civil Police Museum of the State of São Paulo, this story is narrated and told by police officer Eduardo Pretel, the site's visitors' monitor.

=== Chico Picadinho ===
The collection also preserves photographs of the Chico Picadinho case, committed between 1960 and 1970. Francisco Costa Rocha, author of the two crimes considered the most barbaric in Brazilian police history, was indicted for killing and dismembering two women.

The story of Francisco's disorders, commonly known as Chico Picadinho, began at the age of eight during his childhood in Espírito Santo, more precisely in Cariacica. Around 1942, Chico's mother started working as a call girl, and he began to be sexually abused as a child, constantly visiting brothels and using amphetamines. Faced with this situation and affected by so many mental disorders, Francisco planned the perfect scenario to commit the crimes he wanted. His first victim was Margareth Suida, whose death was violent and resulted in Chico Picadinho being tried and sentenced to eighteen years for his actions.

=== The Park Maniac ===
Still considered one of Brazil's most shocking serial killers, the case of the Park Maniac is one of the country's most complex and heinous crimes. Committed by motorcycle courier Francisco de Assis Pereira, the acts occurred in the State Park, in the city of São Paulo, and were marked by the sexual assault and subsequent murder of the victims. Francisco followed the same modus operandi: he approached his victims at bus stops or in public places and introduced himself as a modeling agent. He would convince the women that he was looking for talented people to take photographs outdoors and in the middle of nature. After convincing them, he would take them to the park, where he would rape and strangle his victims, hiding the corpses there.

As soon as the bodies were discovered by the police, the case became public. Survivors began to appear to assist in the search for the killer, contributing to the creation of a sketch and, later, the identification of the criminal, who was arrested just 23 days after his discovery and confessed to the murder of 15 women between 1995 and 1998.

The case of the Park Maniac drew attention to cases of serial killers with psychological disorders. Sexually abused by an aunt and forced to have homosexual relations with one of his bosses, Francisco developed disorders that eventually affected his behavior and created a "breast fixation" and impulses that he considered uncontrollable. As a result, the necessity to understand more about the profile and background of the criminals became clear to the São Paulo and Brazilian police.

=== Drugs ===
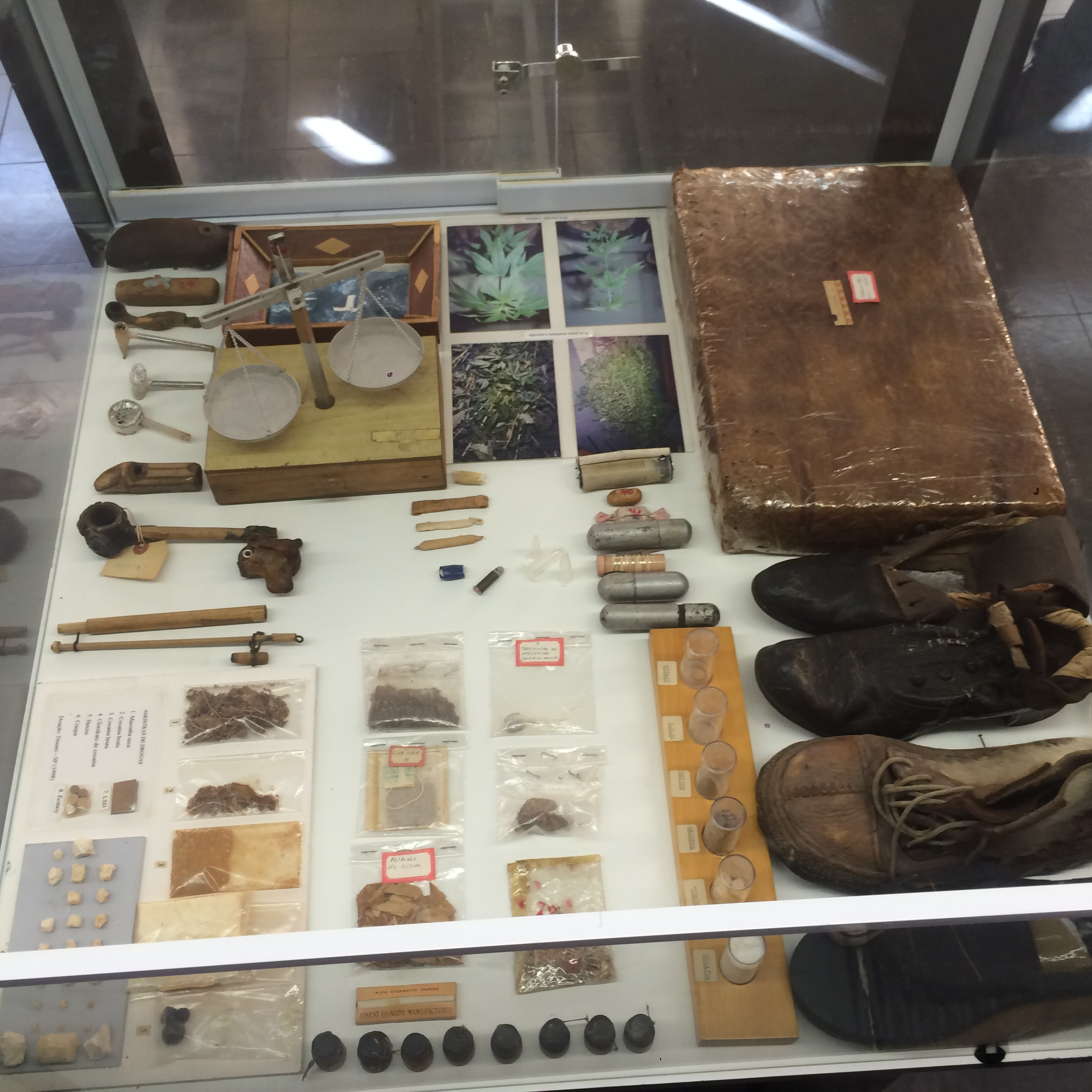
Drug collection.

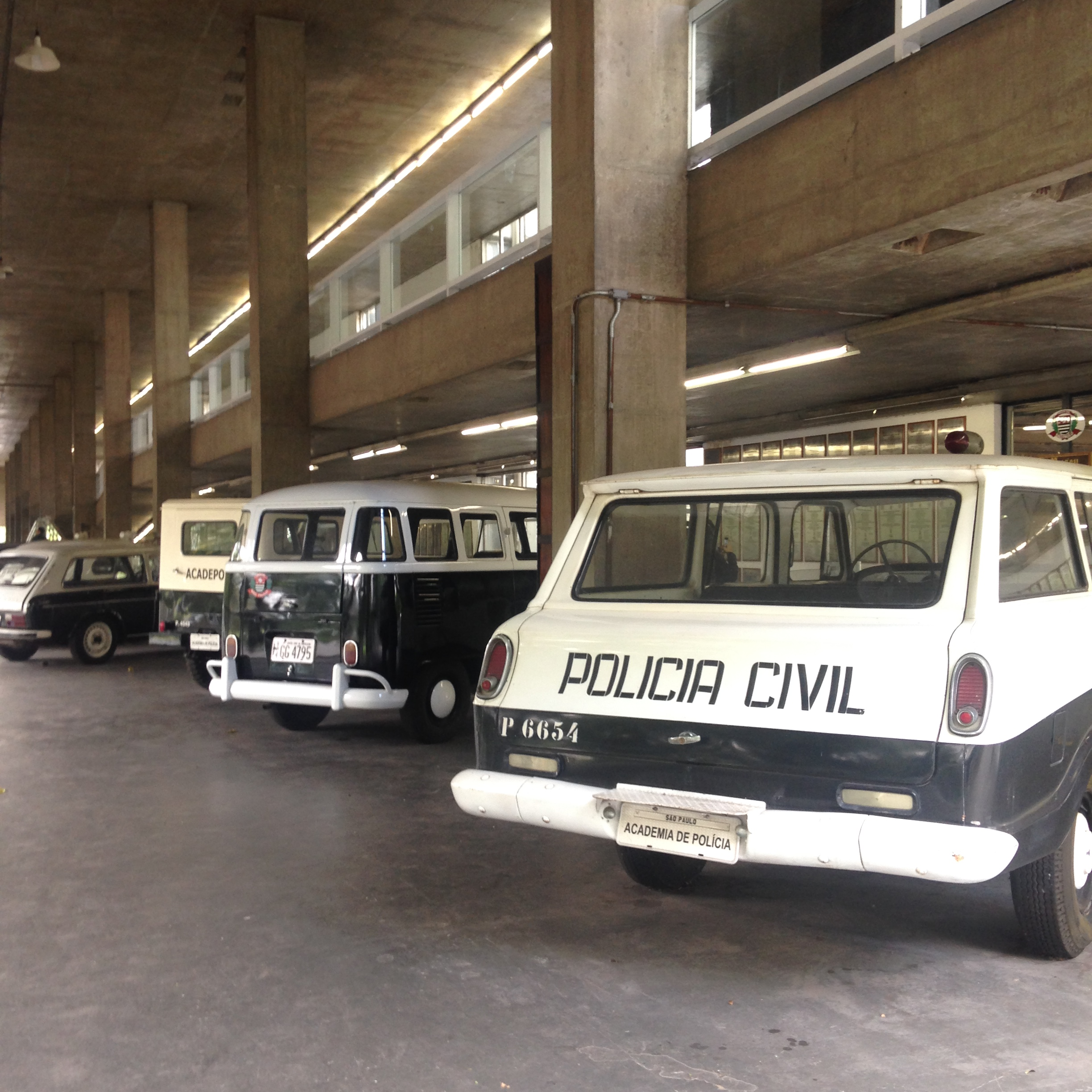
Vehicle display.

The museum provides an area for visitors to access information on the harmful effects of different types of licit and illicit drugs, such as marijuana, cocaine, crack and other types of narcotics. As a didactic approach, the self-explanatory panels simultaneously present the drugs commonly found in users' daily lives and relevant characteristics about each substance. The fact that the museum deals with the subject of "drugs" is considered an attraction and object of study for students, since this topic is usually the subject of assignments required by educators from Acadepol's training and courses, as well as law professors.

=== Cars ===
At the entrance to the museum there is an exhibition of cars that were used by the civil police in previous decades, such as the Willys MB, which was used a lot during the military dictatorship, and the VW Variant, very common in the 80s. At the time, the cars used by the police were icons of the public forces.

== Architecture ==
An agreement was signed between the Police School and the Armando Salles Oliveira University City Construction Fund to enable the creation of a new building. The document was signed by the Secretary of Public Security, Dr. Virgílio Lopes da Silva, as well as the Director of the Police School, Dr. José César Pestana and finally, the executive director of the University City Construction Fund, Paulo de Camargo e Almeida.

The design of the architectural complex was mainly drawn up by Décio Tozzi. After about 10 years, in February 1970, the new building was ready to house all its facilities. On May 11, 1970, during the celebration of the awarding of certificates to the students of the Security and Intelligence Course (already held in its new facilities), Col. Danilo Darcy de Sá da Cunha e Melo, Secretary of Public Security, stated that the Police Academy's activities in its new headquarters could be inaugurated. The museum was one of the planned parts of the building and is located on the second floor in a 600 m^{2} room.

== Gallery ==
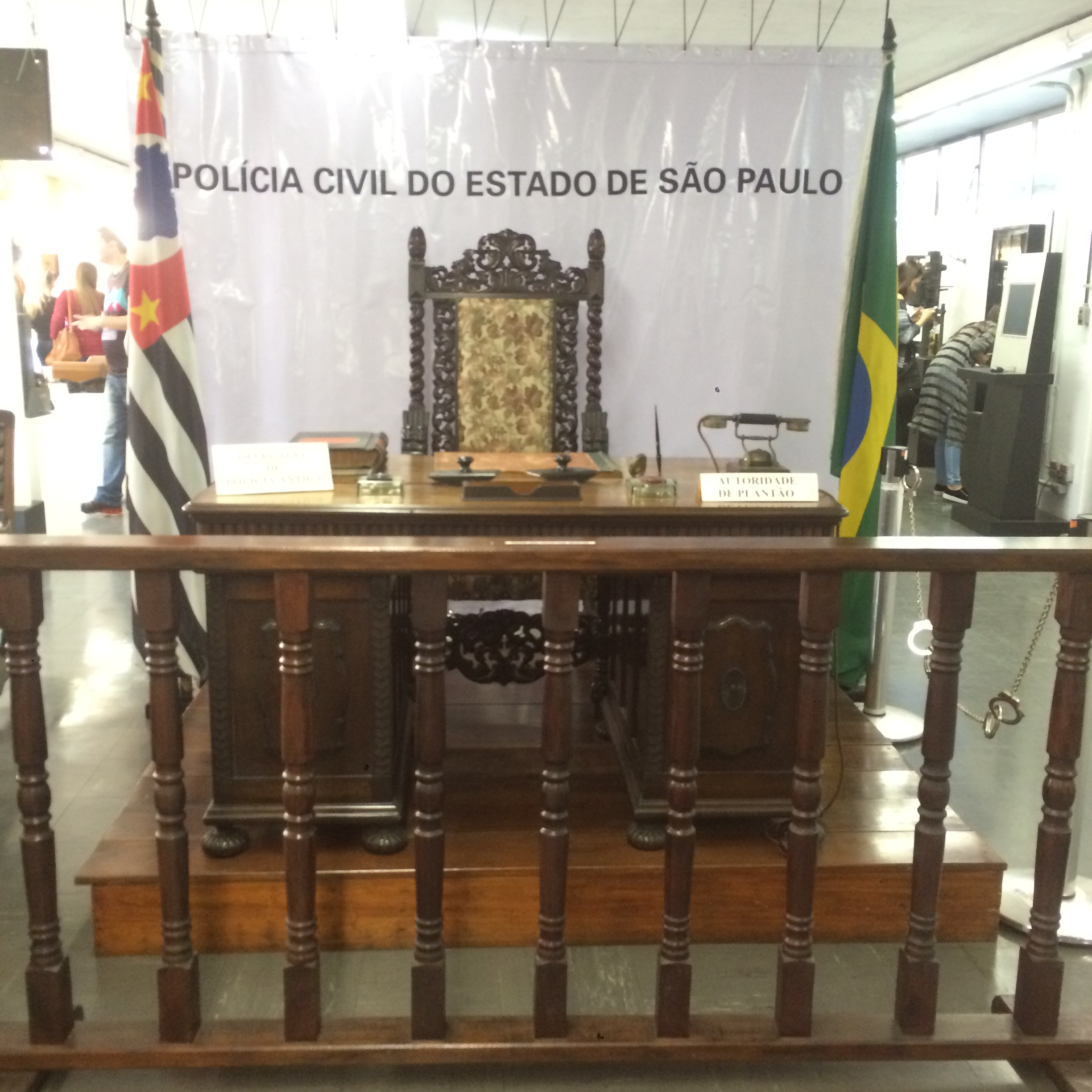
Office of the Civil Police Museum.

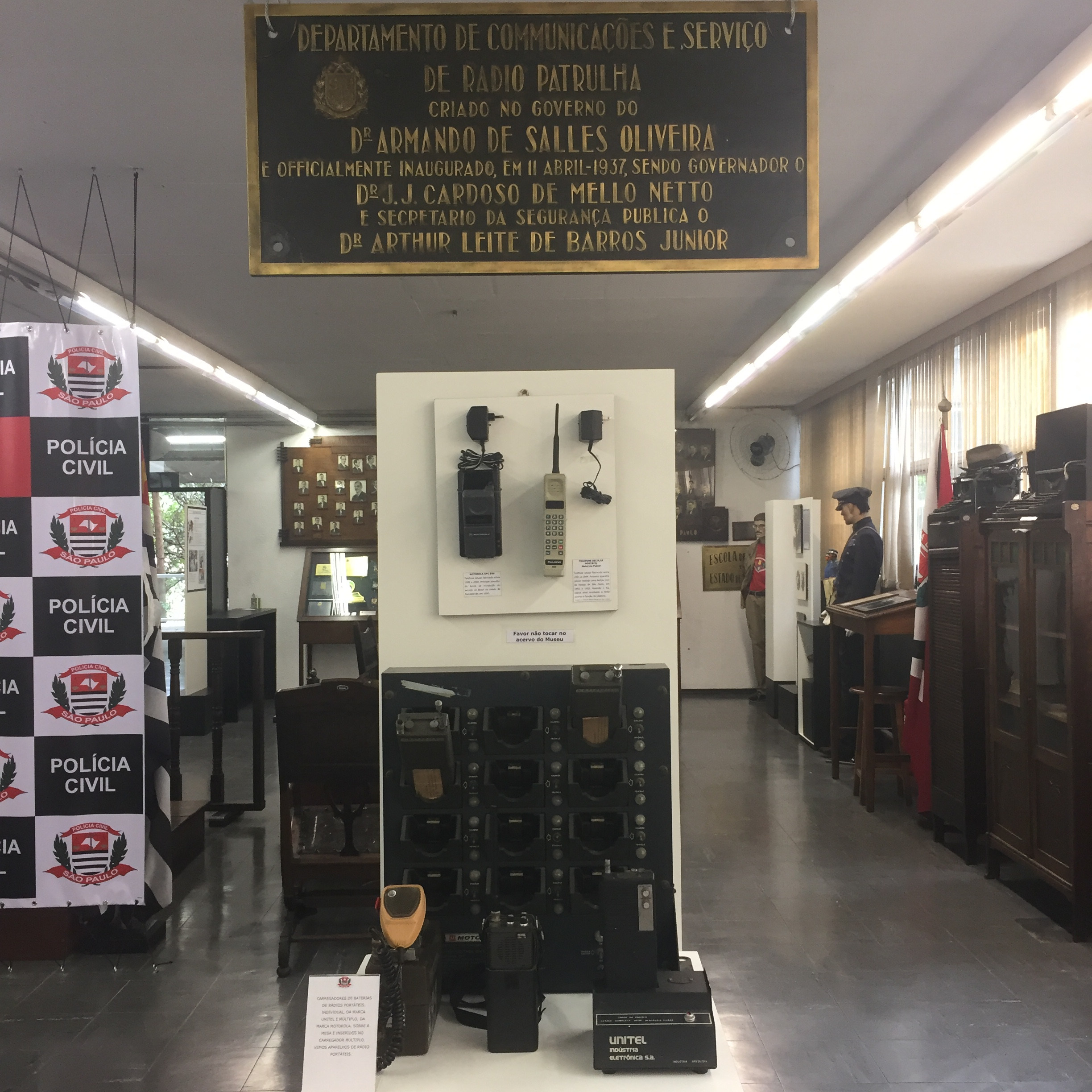
Inside the museum

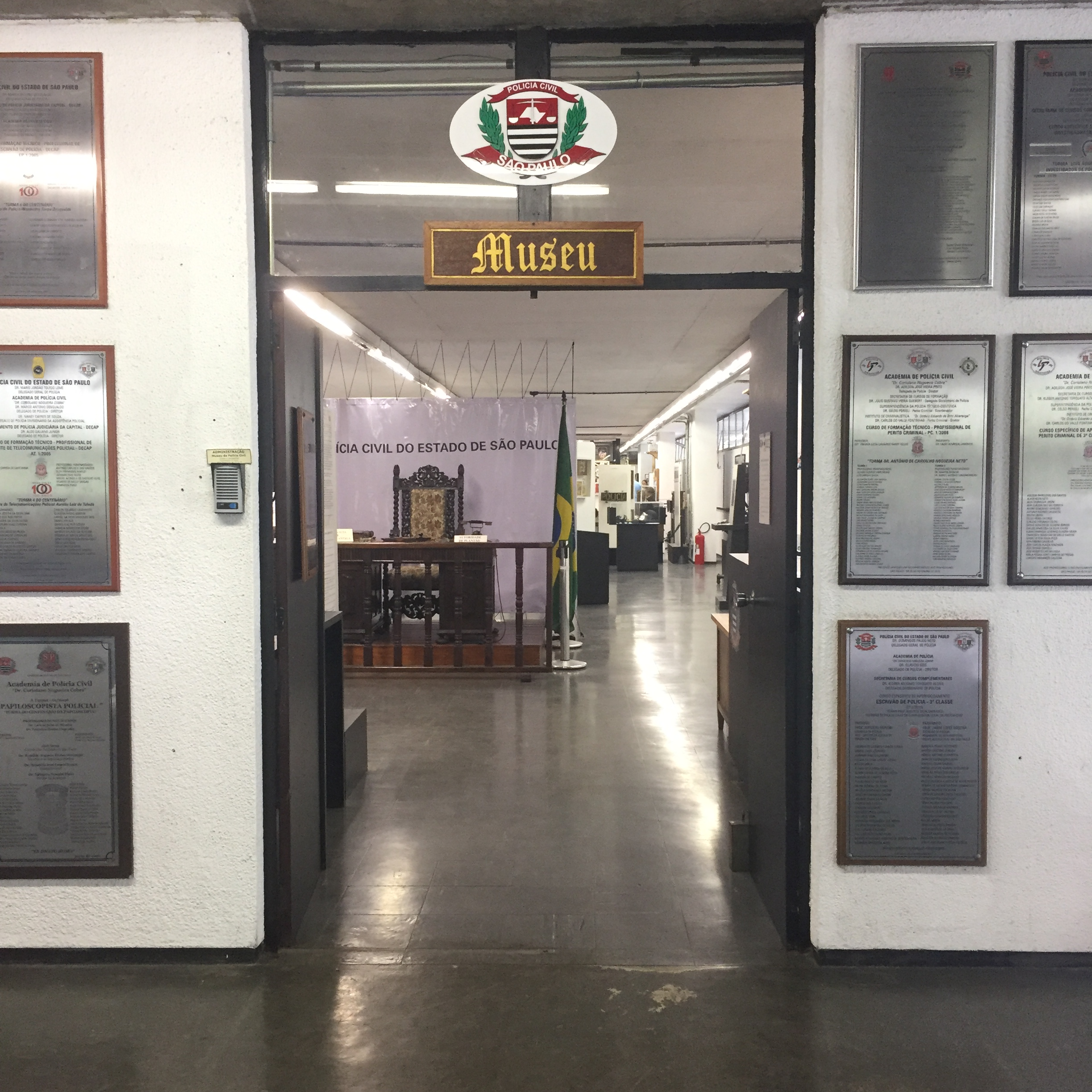
Museum entrance.

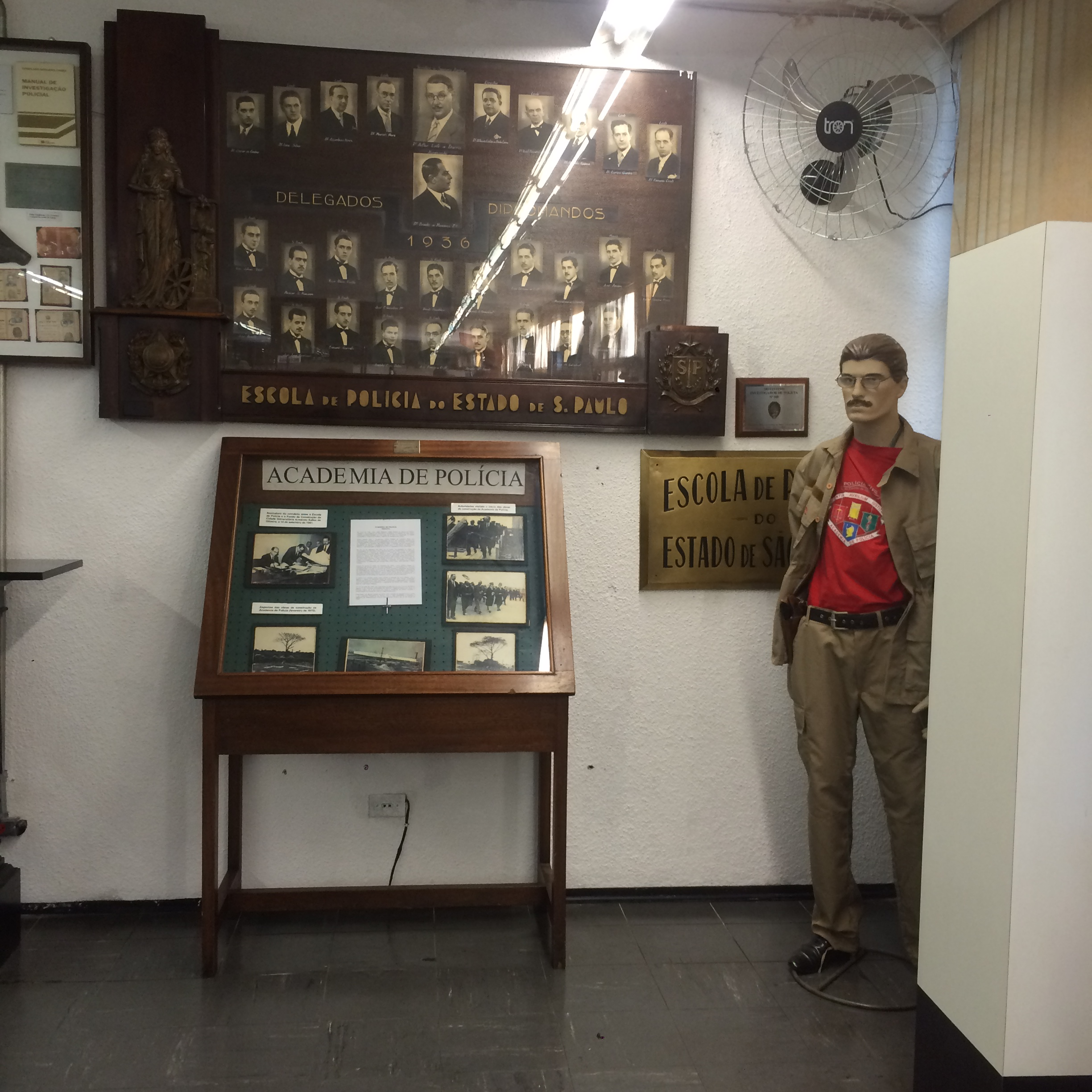
Museum collection.

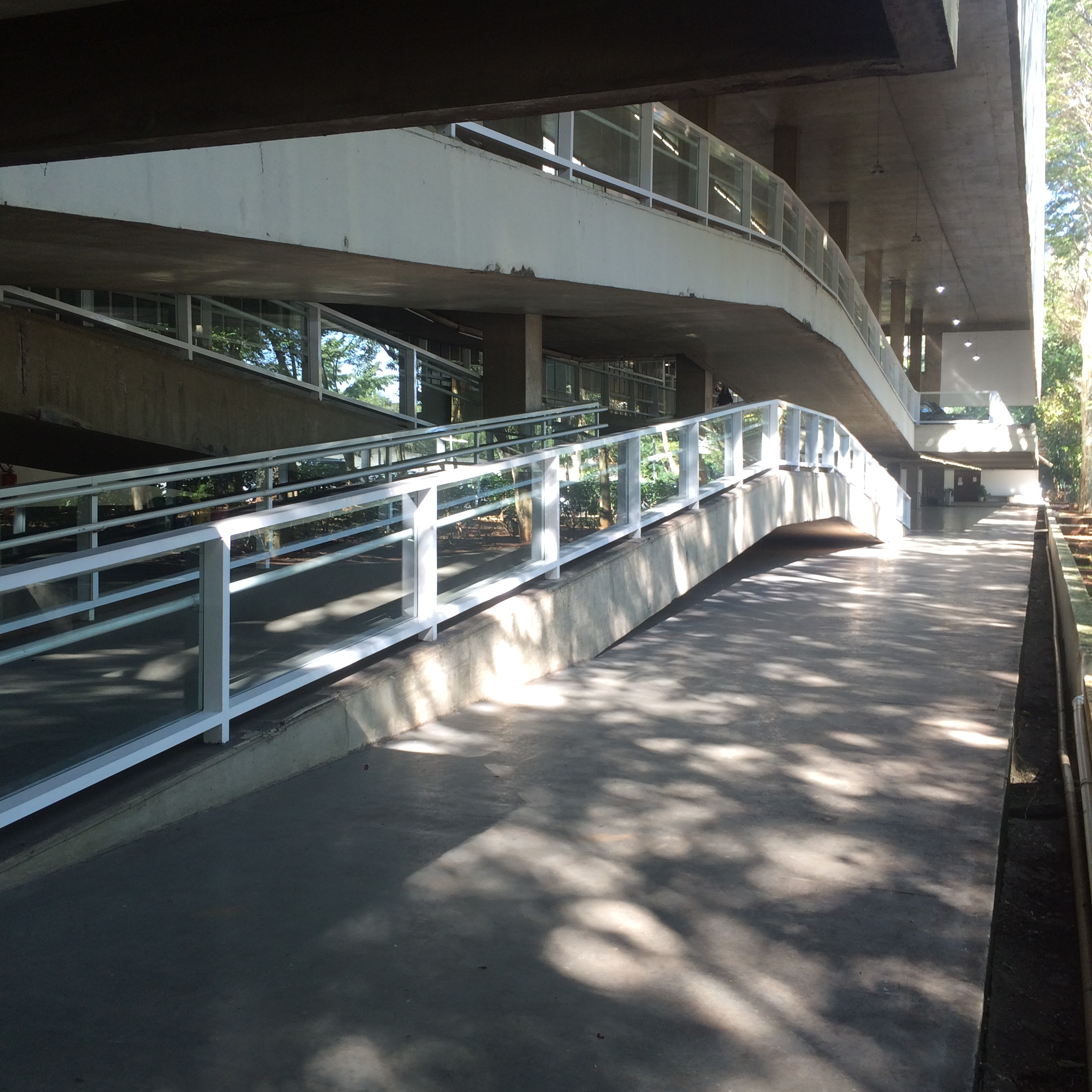
Museum entrance.

== See also ==
- Museum of the Military Police of the state of São Paulo
- Military Police of São Paulo State
