= Werner Haberkorn =

Brazilian businessman

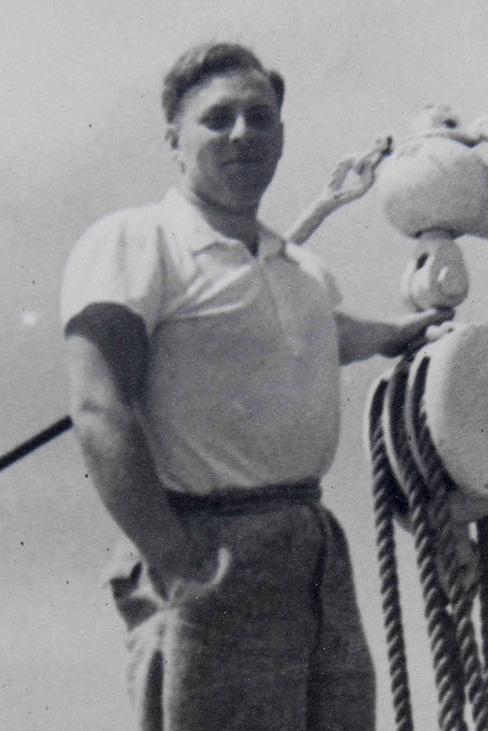
- Werner Haberkorn, 1936
- Born: March 12, 1907; Mysłowice, German Empire
- Died: July 1, 1997 (aged 90); São Paulo, Brazil
- Occupation: Photographer

Werner Haberkorn (March 12, 1907 – July 1997) was a German-Brazilian engineer, photographer, and businessman. Haberkorn arrived in Brazil as an immigrant in the 1930s, accompanied by his wife Luise. Together with his brother, Geraldo Haberkorn, he founded one of the most important postcard companies in the country, Fotolabor. It produced thousands of postcards throughout the 1940s and 1950s, many of which were widely circulated. Haberkorn body of work allows the visualization of the urban transformation of the city of São Paulo in the mid-20th century.

Werner Haberkorn died in 1997 at the age of 90. He left a legacy of aerial photographs, panoramic views, advertising stills, postcards, albums and photographic montages. A large body of his work is located at the Werner Haberkorn Collection at the Paulista Museum of the University of São Paulo. The remainder of his archive remains with his children.

== Personal life ==
Werner Haberkorn was born on March 12, 1907, in Mislowitz (Mysłowice) in the Upper Silesia region. Upper Silesia belonged to Germany at the time of his birth, but today is part of Poland. His family was financially secure and established their businesses in Breslau, now Wrocław. Among Otto and Emmy Haberkorn's three children, Werner was the oldest. His father, Otto, worked in several commercial areas, two of which were hospitality and metallurgy, in addition to being the owner of a cigarette factory.

Haberkorn graduated in 1930 from Technische Hochschule de Breslau, now the Wrocław University of Science and Technology. He graduated with a degree as a machine engineer, specializing in aircraft mechanics. Before opening his own company, he worked for a period at Junkers, the German aircraft and aircraft engine manufacturer.

Haberkorn was a photography hobbyist, and was influenced mainly by his father, who shared the same passion. As an amateur photographer during the 1930s, he dedicated himself to recording his travels in Europe, and maintained numerous albums. These collections are currently held by the family and express Haberkorn's attention to the landscape, with a focus on urbanized spaces.

The photographer's first trip in Brazil was in 1936. He recorded daily life in Rio de Janeiro and São Paulo, as well as life in factories and streets and some landscape photographs. Germany, at that time, was under the Nazi regime, responsible for the persecution of people of Jewish descent. In this political context, one of the motivations of his trip to Brazil was to spread information about Rio de Janeiro and São Paulo as possible destinations for Jewish communities willing to leave German and its associated territories.

On the way to Brazil with the ship Jamaique, Werner passed through Lisbon, also photographing the route, until he reached Brazil. He toured Petrópolis, Rio de Janeiro and São Paulo, staying for a month and a half in Brazil. The entire itinerary of the trip was recorded by photographs that made up an album. These records, however, remained in Germany, even after his immigration to Brazil. After the trip, Haberkorn gave some lectures in Germany on Brazil to Jewish communities. He used his body of photography from his 1936 to explain conditions of daily life in Brazil.

=== Immigration ===
Haberkorn arrived in Brazil as an immigrant in 1937, a year after his initial visit to the country. He was the first of his family to settle in Brazil. He, together with his wife, settled in the city of São Paulo between June and July 1937. He and his wife lived in the region of Vale do Anhangabaú and Praça da República for a period. The city's entertainment sector, such as cinemas and museums, was concentrated in the two neighborhoods. Haberkorn did not work in photography at first; he was the commercial representative of a German manufacturer. Werner left his role as a spokesman for the company, as there was great difficulty in importing the machinery from Germany as a consequences of World War II.

Geraldo Haberkorn, his brother, attended the Bermpohl Institute in Germany and graduated in 1938. The name of the institute was a tribute to the creator of a color photographic system, Wilhelm Bermpohl. It was in this environment that Geraldo learned one of the techniques of color photography, which became known as the Bermpohl System. This system was based on trichromy; a camera was used to generate three negatives, allowing the reconstitution of colors at the time of the production of the positive copy. Geraldo moved to Brazil in 1939, bringing from Germany a copy of the Bermpohl machine and another one of photocopies. He additionally had a knowledge of photochromic procedures. Geraldo Haberkorn initially worked at Fotóptica but joined Werner in 1940. The two founded Fotolabor in the same year.

Haberkorn and his wife converted to Catholicism between 1939 and 1940. Luise's parents and brothers moved to Brazil in 1939. Werner's first daughter, Vera, was born in 1940. Three years later, the couple had a son, Ernesto. Although they helped in the family business while, the photographer's children did not follow their father's career.

== Career in Brazil ==
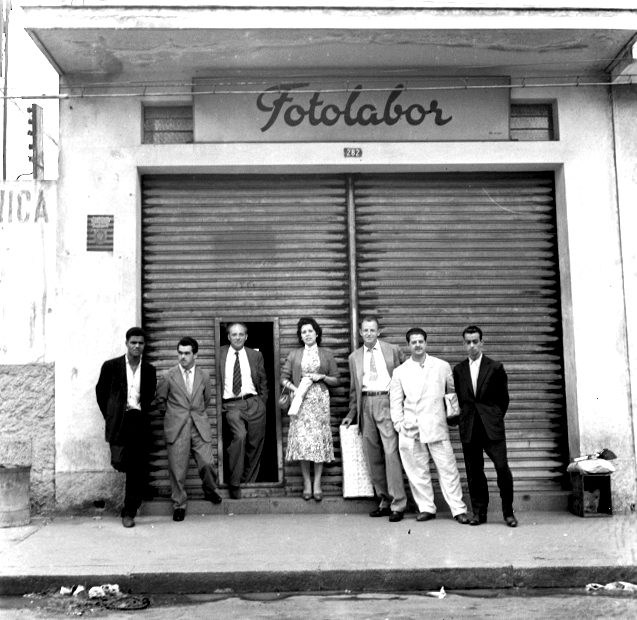
Werner Haberkorn in front of Fotolabor, São Paulo

There was a fine line between Haberkorn's personal life and the company, Fotolabor. Although he is not recognized as a prominent photographer in Brazil, his images are of great importance to study the urban transformations of the city of São Paulo throughout part of the 20th century. His company was also one of the most active publishers of postcards in São Paulo. According to his daughter, Vera Flieg, Werner did not see his profession as an art, but rather as an extremely technical endeavor.

=== Fotolabor ===
The Haberkorn brothers' company was founded in 1940. In addition to the photocopy brought from Germany by Geraldo, the beginning of Fotolabor was marked by the use of the coloring technique. The outbreak of World War II caused problems with the supply of raw materials needed for some of the equipment. The consequence of this was the end of the use of the Bermpohl photochromic system, which was also already being overtaken by new techniques and becoming commercially unfeasible. The company initially offered photocopying service and did works aimed at industrial photography, creating product catalogs and advertising for various brands.

Fotolabor was also impacted by restrictions and surveillance by Brazilian authorities during World War II. Orders placed by the company went through inspection authorities to ensure that they were not purchases of explosive materials, weapons, or ammunition. These restrictions affected not only Fotolabor, but also other photography professionals who had immigrated at the same time.

The company's location was favorable to the brothers' business, as it was close to the Post Office and in the region of the city where the greatest changes brought about by modernity were taking place. Werner also attributed part of Fotolabor's success to a photocopy machine. Only two establishments had this equipment in the region of the old center of São Paulo, and the company of the Haberkorn brothers was one of them. The photocopy machine provided initial income for the family business. This income, for example, was what allowed the use of the Bermpohl staining system.

It is possible to say that Haberkorn's photography was exclusively linked to commercial, rather than artistic, concerns. Even the name of the business refers to its commercial aspect, with "labor" as part of the company name. According to advertisements in telephone directories, Fotolabor offered photo-retouching, advertising, catalogs, clichés and photocopying services from 1944 to 1946. The company expanded the services in 1950, adding developing, color copies, and photography for industry and commerce.

=== Postcards ===
Fotolabor published postcards beginning in 1942; it was initially a source of supplementary income for the company. As industrial photography market was seasonal, Werner produced postcards to complement the company's income. The postcards, however, started to have an increasing circulation, making this one of its main activities for a period of time. The central theme of its postcards were cityscapes and changes in large urban centers such as São Paulo and Rio de Janeiro. Not all postcards had images made by Haberkorn. In the case of photographs of football teams and artists, for example, he only bought negatives to reproduce in postcard format.

One of Fotolabor's most active years was 1950, when the company became one of the largest producers of photographic postcards in São Paulo. The city's industrialization process happened simultaneously to Fotolabor's success, and continued throughout the 1950s. São Paulo was going through great transformations, undergoing great urban and cultural changes. As a result of this economic and social change, Fotolabor's photographs also began to receive new treatments and uses. Another point that interfered with the circulation of photos was the increase in consumption by the population.

The company increased to 40 professionals to accommodate this great production. They performed developing, processing, enlarging, and catalog assembly. Around 1955 they opened a Fotolabor branch, but there they offered the service of a third-party photography laboratory.

Despite all the success, the end of the era of Fotolabor's postcards was not long in coming. Photo processing machines were very expensive and color films were already becoming very popular. The Haberkorn brothers made an attempt to print the postcard with colors, but the quality of the chosen process was low and they were not successful. The interest of the consumer market was also changing, already being modified by the development of television and telephony. As a result, Fotolabor ceases to publish postcards in the late 1950s.

Colombo was the first to make photographic postcards, we were the second. The former Colombo company had been around for a long time, and we did like him. We were, here, the only ones who produced photographic postcards at that time. Then, when postcard started to be made in offset, many companies appeared. Around 1960, we ended the production of postcards, as we were no longer able to produce them with the same quality and quantity as the competitors.

=== The final years of Fotolabor ===
Fotolabor operated in the advertising market until 1970s, working with both small agencies and larger companies, such as Colabor and Panam Propaganda. At the same time, the company entered the cinema exhibition market, offering the production of slides for television. The Haberkorn brothers' company operated for five decades, ending its activities in 1990. Werner was responsible for keeping Fotolabor running until the last year of its operation, since Geraldo's unit closed its activities in the 1980s. The company's facilities and equipment were gradually passed on to its employees.

=== Photography ===
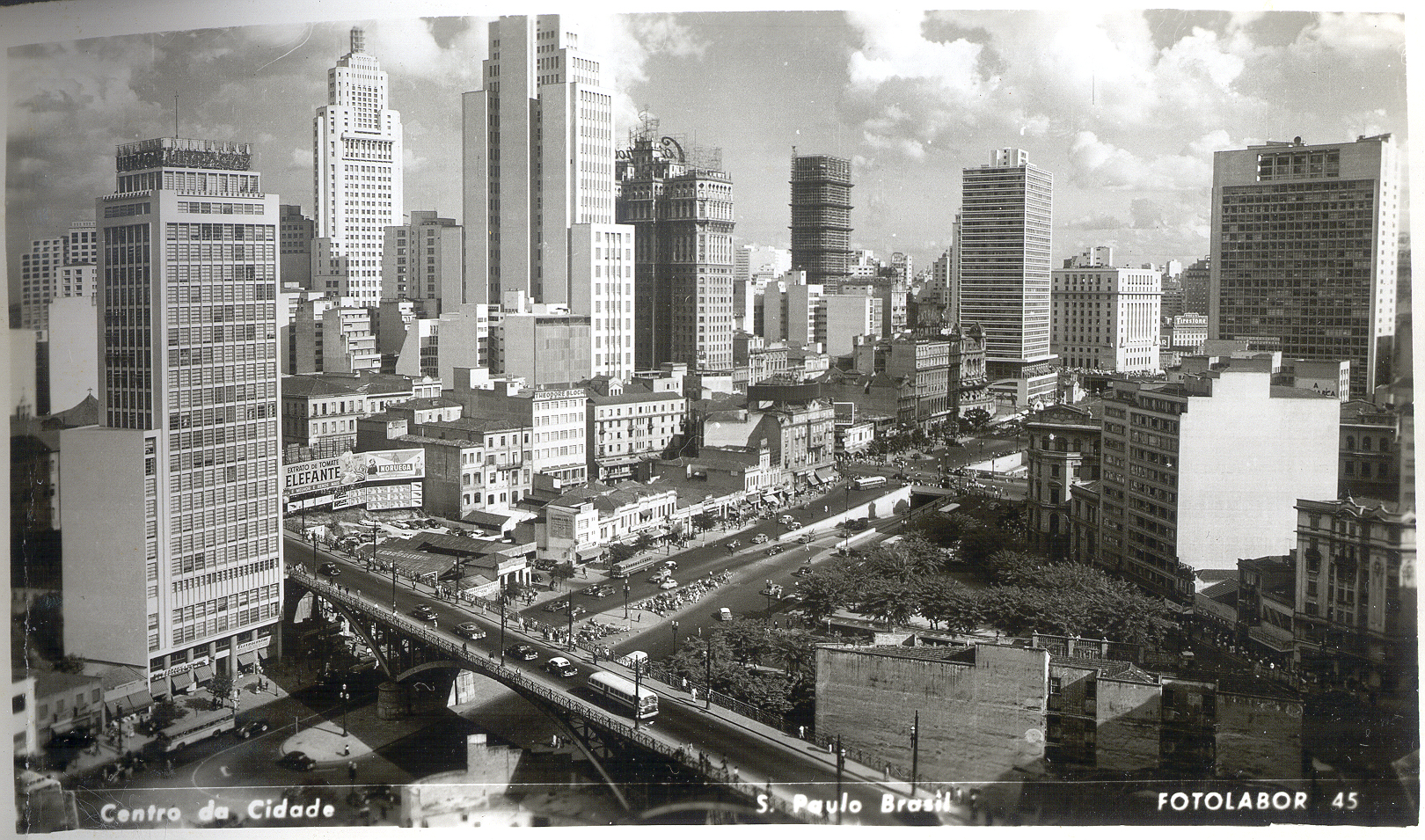
Panoramic view of São Paulo city center

Haberkorn's photography was essentially technical and his main objective was to document the changes brought about by modernity and the development of the city. In addition, his photomontages always followed a creative line. Most of the Fotolabor postcards were undated so that they could be resold in successive year. Werner initially worked in industrial photography, taking jobs linked to architectural projects and other commercial photography. Unlike other companies of the time, he is not interested in portrait photography, and always preferred technical photography.

Haberkorn preferred advertising-style work; it was a way to showcase his company's products. Photography served as a way to view objects in different ways and to discern details previously ignored. Another Haberkorn characteristic within the medium was sensing what his individual clients wanted, adapting his photographic techniques according to the project and client.

Because the market is relatively new, there was some complication in accessing equipment and supplies. The camera he had brought with him from Germany, for example, was not ideal for technical photography. For this reason, he changed his camera at Casa Kosmos and, over the years, changed equipment according to the need for new technology.

Throughout his career, Haberkorn recording the "before and after" of many spaces in São Paulo. He was careful to choose the same angles and places over the years to clarify changes to the urban landscape. This desire to continuously photograph the transformations that occurred in the city was clarified by his daughter, Vera Flieg.

My dad started photographing the city to make postcards. He photographed an urban scene, and in two or three years he saw that it had completely changed. Then he said: 'Let's create new postcards, because this is different.' His vision was like that. 'This part of the city has changed a lot, we need to photograph it again'. He produced bad postcards from 1942 until 1958. It was just when the city changed too much.

In order to highlight the verticalization of the city, Haberkorn gave preference to frames that contrasted vertical elements, especially in the case of buildings. The inversion of scales was also a strategy used by the photographer, exploring, for example, the contrast between new, tall, and modern buildings with low and old houses. Another technique of the photographer was to frame elements of nature in the foreground and, in the medium plane, buildings.

The horizontal expansion of the city was highlighted in panoramic photographs or when traffic routes appeared in the foreground. Thus, the intention is to show the city as an environment of great circulation, be it people or goods. The records of the expansion suburban horizontal view also revealed the city beyond the verticalized core. In many of his photos, the scarce vegetation takes over from the foreground and in some cases is placed in contrast to a high building in the middle plane of the photograph. In general, Werner's photographs create the possibility of reconstructing, through them, a new concept of urban beauty.

In the beginning of the production of postcards, Haberkorn showed interest in scenes daily life and the banal. However, postcards with the scenes disappeared in time, as they had little commercial appeal. The photographer was also always attentive to the major issues in the media so that he could somehow make postcards related to them. Among these postcards of this type are the photo of the singer Francisco Alves, at the time called "Rei da Voz" of Brazil; and the postcard with the Brazilian football team from the 1950s and 1958. Postcards from soccer were always among the best sellers, especially on game days. At that time, Brazil started to be considered "the country of football". For this reason, employees worked harder when a game was taking place.

Aerial photographs of the city of São Paulo were also part of the countless photographic projects that became postcards. Werner had an acquaintance who was able to contact the Brazil Ministry of Aviation, allowing him access to an airplane in the 1940s to photograph the city, something that uncommon up to that point. In some of these projects, the angle chosen by the photographer does not show the sky and focuses only on the numerous buildings in the city of São Paulo, always highlighting urbanization.

Unlike other companies in the photographic market, which imported all equipment from abroad, Werner used his engineering knowledge to assemble a unique machine for one of Fotolabor's services. It was dedicated to the processing and automatic development of postcards, using a photographic paper from the manufacturer Domingos Bove. The equipment was designed to streamline the production of postcards, which is why automation of the service was so essential.

Haberkorn also manually colored some of the postcards produced by Fotolabor. The colors had the function of highlighting some parts of the urban landscape; however, this process was only performed on more popular postcards. In these cases, their children Vera and Ernesto used to color the cards, working with the production and finishing team.

Haberkorn took a course in Rio de Janeiro to learn about the colored photographic paper of the AGFA company. With this new technology, the photographer is able to differentiate himself in the advertising market, putting Fotolabor in the spotlight within this medium until its last years of operation.

== Legacy ==
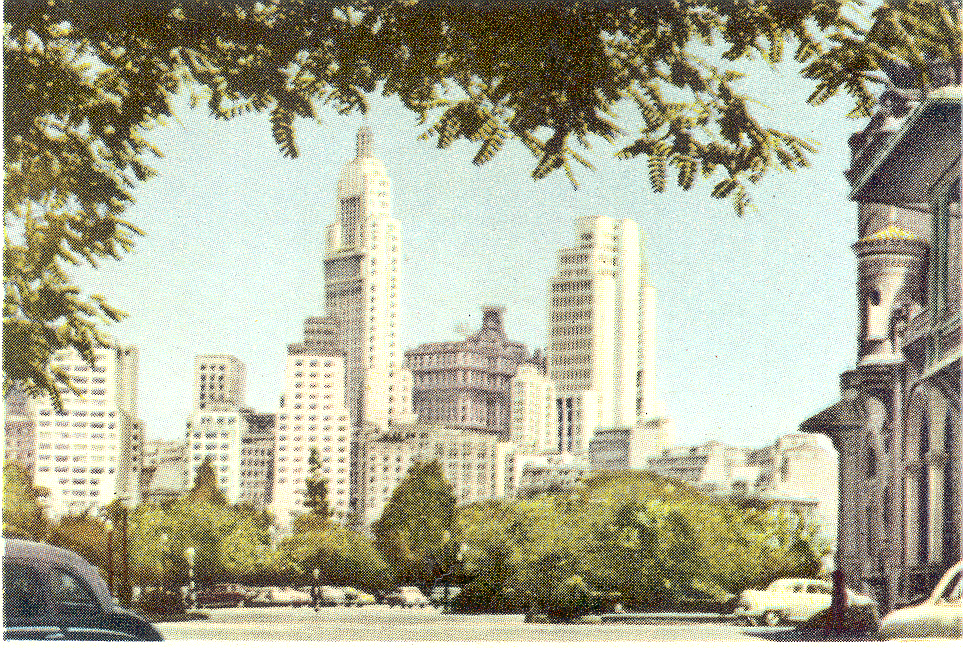
Legislative Assembly of the city of São Paulo

The establishment of Fotolabor was an important milestone for applied photography in Brazil, as well as in the field of advertising and industrial photography. To this day, its photographic style does not receive the same attention and recognition when compared to other iconographic genres. Through photographic collections, customer relations, purpose of orders and production records, it is possible to outline a general scenario of what the business models and strategies of marketing were like in the area of photography at that time, between the 1940s and 1960s, as well as getting to know the technical side of the photographs.

In addition, Haberkorn's photography allows the visualization of the transformations of São Paulo in the 1940s and 1950s, taking into account the changes in Brazilian infrastructure, lifestyle, and even changes in the urban design of the city. In the productions of this period, the two main factors of modernization are clear, namely verticalization, horizontal expansion, and self-mobilization. The fact that Fotolabor works for a while in the area of urban view meant that the photographer kept his attention on the primary symbolic points of the city, such as the Vale do Anhangabaú. Although his works are within a short period, each of the photographs allows the examination of the wider process of urbanization in Vale do Anhangabaú. This region was a favorite not only of Werner, but also of its competitors. They key symbols of the modernization of the city were located here, such as tall buildings and viaducts, were concentrated.

Haberkorn's lenses registered from low buildings to their replacement with buildings with more than ten floors. The transformation of the streets and the traffic were also photographed, always highlighting elements of the streetscape. From his photographs, it is possible to notice the emergence of new forms of housing and buildings. The landscapes on the postcards also outline the main symbols of the city of São Paulo of the period. In addition, the success of certain postcard themes outlines the most popular types of entertainment of the period, especially those linked to soccer and the music industry.

Currently, the Werner Haberkorn Collection is part of the collection of the Museu Paulista Collection, and was acquired in 1999. The photographs are exhibited to the general public, as well as information on his editing processes. The collection has more than 640 images, containing photos from São Paulo, Campinas, Santos, Rio de Janeiro, as well as photos of products that they were probably used for showcase purposes by Fotolabor customers. The documentary part of the collection includes invoices, order forms, and advertising cards. The relevance of São Paulo to Haberkorn's production is clear: 367 of them depict the city.

Part of this collection was shown in the exhibition Werner Haberkorn e o Fotolabor, at Caixa Cultural São Paulo in 2014. With part of the photographic and documentary set of the Haberkorn Collection, the public was able to have a greater contact with the photography market, mainly in the 1940s and 1950s.
