= Two-color projection =

Two-color projection is a name given to a variety of methods of projecting a full-color image using two different single-color projectors. James Clerk Maxwell first suggested he had discovered such a projection system when researching color vision in the 1850s. The mechanism of perception involved was studied in more detail in the 1950s by Edwin H. Land, who noticed a similar effect while working on a three-color system of projection.

Land conducted experiments with different two-color systems starting in 1955, studying why the observed perception of color from such projections might be stronger than would be suggested by color theory alone, publishing results in 1959 in PNAS and Scientific American. To demonstrate how this was different from substractive film processes, his most widely reproduced experiment used only red and white projections to evoke a range of colors. A version of this technique was proposed as an improvement on existing two-color television systems.

Land and John McCann later proposed what they called the retinex theory of color vision, in which the retina and cortex work together to produce the experience of color. This work included spatial algorithms for estimating how color is perceptually integrated across a scene.

== See also ==
- Land effect
- Retinex theory
