= Map of Céspedes Xeria =

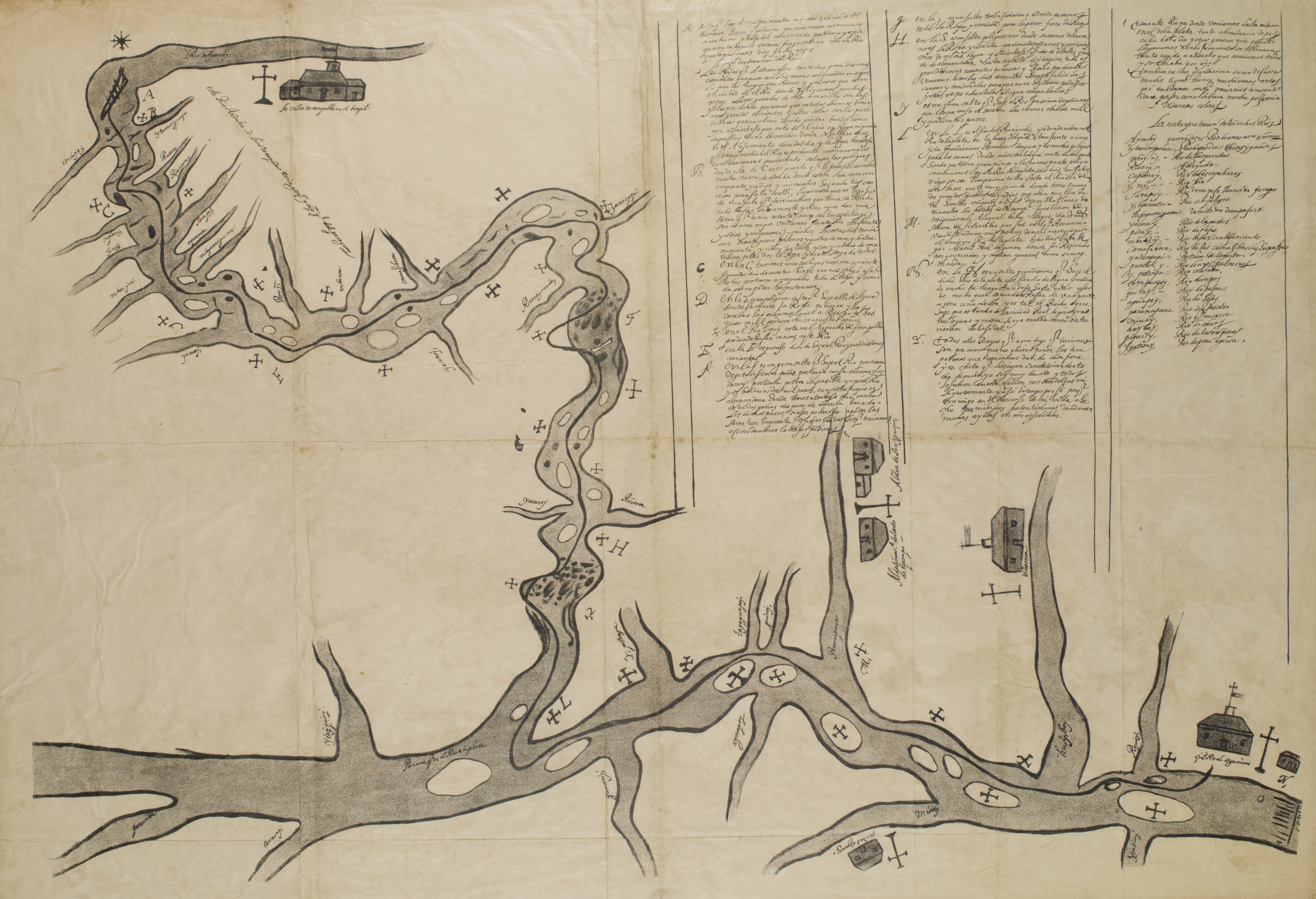
- Detail from the Map of Céspedes Xeria
- Original title: Mapa del río Ayembí y del Paraná, con sus afluentes, que recorrió Luis de Céspedes Jería, gobernador del Paraguay, al entrar en su jurisdicción desde Brasil
- Created: 1626
- Presented: 1627
- Location: General Archive of the Indies, Seville, Spain
- Author: Luis de Céspedes García Xería
- Media type: map
- Subject: Geography of Southeast Region of Brazil

The Map of Céspedes Xeria (Portuguese: Mapa de Céspedes Xeria or Map of the Ayembí y del Paraná River, with its tributaries, which Luis de Céspedes Jería, governor of Paraguay, used to enter into the jurisdiction from Brazil, Spanish: Mapa del río Ayembí y del Paraná, con sus afluentes, que recorrió Luis de Céspedes Jería, gobernador del Paraguay, al entrar en su jurisdicción desde Brasil) is a map produced by Dom Luis de Céspedes García Xería, a 17th-century Spanish military officer. The map is dated November 8, 1628. It depicts the path that Xeria traveled between the village of São Paulo de Piratininga, now the modern city of São Paulo, to Ciudad Real de Guayrá, Province of Paraguay. Ciudad Real de Guayrá was a Spanish-held city in the present-day Brazilian state of Paraná. Xeria travelled using the Tietê and Paraná rivers from July 16 to September 18, 1628. The dimensions of the Map of Céspedes Xeria are 118 centimetres (46 in) x 79 centimetres (31 in). The Map of Céspedes Xeria is the first known of the interior of the state of São Paulo and the first to establish a cartographic representation the wider Southeast region of Brazil. It provides the earliest representations of the Tietê and Paraná rivers.

The Museu do Ipiranga (commonly known as the Paulista Museum) acquired a facsimile copy of the map in 1917. The Map of Céspedes Xeria established a historical narrative of the São Paulo region in the 20th century; it additionally aided in the interpretation of the development of the territory of what would be the state of São Paulo. Images of the map have subsequently appeared in a large range of textbooks, book covers, magazine covers, and other publications related to the history of São Paulo.

== Luis de Céspedes García Xeria ==
Little is known about Luis de Céspedes García Xería. He lived in the 17th century, and arrived in present-day Brazil to administer the Spanish colony of Paraguay. He sent an account to Philip of Spain on the arrival of 43 Dutch ships in Bahia and Espírito Santo on July 30, 1627, along with a description of damage caused by the attempted invasion. The event occurred after two conflicts between the Dutch and Spanish-Portuguese forces: the Capture of Bahia in 1624 and Recapture of Bahia in 1625. The Map of Céspedes Xeria is dated 1628, shortly before the establishment of Dutch Brazil.

== Description ==
The Map of Céspedes Xeria was produced to accompany a letter from Céspedes Xería to King Philip IV of Spain (also styled as King Philip III of Portugal). It was likely a report of the route of Tietê (denominated the Río Ayembí on the map) and Paraná rivers to facilitate the formation of foreign policy of Philip IV. Xeria's route is represented by a red line on the map. It is accompanied by illustrations of cities, towns, and indigenous villages. Nature is poorly represented in the map, other than river banks and some islands. The map lacks reliable coordinates, a compass rose, an indication of north orientation, projections, scale, or geometric precision.

The Tietê River is represented in the upper left quadrants of the map, together with Vila de São Paulo. The Paraná River appears in the lower left quadrants of the documents; the settlements are in the lower right quadrants. The legend is in three columns and the crosses along the route to represent landing sites.

== Versions ==
There are two versions of the map: the first is called Map 17 of Céspedes Xeria (Portuguese: Mapa 17 de Céspedes Xeria) and a second is titles Mapa 17bis de Céspedes Xeria. Both are from the General Archive of the Indies in Seville, Spain. Although Céspedes Xeria was a military officer, studies show that he both collected the data and made the drawing. His intention was to send the map directly to Philip of Spain with his letter written in his own hand. Xeria, however, used copyists to produce reproductions of the document; this explains the difference of handwriting between the two versions.

== Facsimile at the Museu Paulista ==
Afonso d'Escragnolle Taunay (1876–1958), historian and director of the Museu Paulista between 1917 and 1946, located the map during the research he carried out at the museum. He had a great interest in the early history of Brazil, and his research focused on the role of the São Paulo region in the formation of the colony of Brazil. Taunay sought to situate the central role of São Paulo in the Independence of Brazil in conjunction of the centenary of the event in 1922.

Taunay discovered the map in 1917, the year he became director of the museum. During this period, he made several structural changes to the institution, primarily to transform it into a historical museum. He inaugurated a room dedicated solely to the history of Brazil and São Paulo, colonial-period cartography, and a display of archival documents. The room is known as "Sala A-10"; maps are prominently displayed to highlight the chronology of Brazilian history. Taunay exchanged archival documents and ordered facsimiles from different institutions from around the world to set up Sala A-10. The Map of Céspedes Xeria was of primary importance to Taunay, and he sought to obtain a copy from the General Archive of the Indies in Seville.

When in 1917, the eminent Pablo Pastells pointed out to me the presence of Céspedes's map in the General Archive of the Indies in Seville, and described it to me, I painfully made a facsimle copy. I was in a hurry to publish this very precious document.

The facsimile of Céspedes Xeria's map was produced by the copyist Santiago Montero Díaz. Díaz, a copyist with extensive experience with works in the collection of the General Archive in Seville, utilized both versions of the map in the archive: Map 17 of Céspedes Xeria and Map 17bis of Céspedes Xeria. He additionally copied letters from Céspedes Xeria to Philip of Spain. Montero Díaz finished work on the facsimile in October 1917 and charge 200 pesetas (178 thousand réis) for the work. Taunay inaugurated Sala A-10 after receipt of the facsimile copy of the map and displayed it in a prominent place in the room. It was framed and displayed with its related documentation, also in facsimile format. Taunay used the map for articles published in Correio Paulistano, the Revista do Instituto Histórico e Geográfico Brasileiro, and the Annals of the Paulista Museum.

== Accuracy and authenticity ==
Discussion about the faithfulness of the facsimile produced by Santiago Montero Díaz began in the late 20th century. Correspondence and comparative analyses between the original map and the facsimile demonstrate that Taunay was unaware that Montero Díaz used two versions of the map to produce the facsimile. However, the facsimile has few differences from the original versions or related documents.
