= Chico Picadinho =

Brazilian murderer

Francisco da Costa Rocha
- Born: April 27, 1942 (age 84); Vila Velha, Espírito Santo, Brazil
- Other name: Chico Picadinho
- Status: In prison
- Criminal charges: First degree murder, dismemberment, corpse concealment, rape
- Penalty: 36 years, 10 months

Chico Picadinho (born April 27, 1942, in Vila Velha), nickname of Francisco da Costa Rocha, is a Brazilian murderer who was convicted of the murder of two women, in 1966 and 1976, respectively. His case was listed by G1 of São Paulo, in 2014, as "9 murder cases that shocked the country".

== Biography ==
Born and raised in Vila Velha, Espírito Santo state, he had a very poor childhood. His father was a coffee exporter and abandoned him as a child, along with his mother. Having to work, she left Francisco with a friend in the city of Cariacica. In interviews, the killer revealed that he had suffered several sexual abuses from the husband of the woman who took care of him, but she never knew, and that he spent weeks without seeing his mother, as she rarely went to visit him. The man who abused de Costa Rocha beat his wife, and in turn she frequently beat da Costa Rocha when he disobeyed.

One of his childhood hobbies was something very cruel: killing cats. After growing up a little, he returned to live with his mother in Vila Velha, where he witnessed the visit of several men at home, when she told him to go to his room and only leave after dawn. It made him realize that she solicited herself to support them. Knowing this fact, added to the abuse he suffered, was a great trauma for him, which would culminate in an explosion of hatred in the future.

As a teenager, he was thrown out of the house after fights with his mother, when he humiliated her and was aggressive. He started to live off small jobs and some thefts, and soon became addicted to alcohol and other drugs. Openly bisexual, he revealed to the psychiatric board, after being arrested for the crimes, that he didn't mind being passive or active; the important thing was to remain a man and have a lot of pleasure. He spent most of his money on gambling and sex workers. He also revealed that he had dismembered the women because he was so angry at the abuse he suffered as a child and because he felt ashamed when he remembered that his mother was a sex worker, like the women he had killed.

== Crimes ==
=== First Murder - Margareth Suida ===
Francisco da Costa Rocha committed his first murder in 1966, in Boca do Lixo, downtown São Paulo. At that time he lived a very bohemian life, with a lot of drunkenness and women, and he also used drugs. Over time, he felt the need to have sex on a daily basis, in addition to taking drugs and drinking heavily.

His first murder, followed by dismemberment, was in 1966. His victim was Margareth Suida, an Austrian dancer who had been living in Brazil for a few years. She was also a woman of the bohemian lifestyle and would occasionally do sexual programs. After drinking a lot and passing by bars and nightclubs in the region, Francisco invited her to have sex. She agreed to go to the apartment on Aurora street, a place that Francisco shared with Caio, his friend, who was a surgeon in the Air Force.

After intercourse, he became violent and attacked her, proceeding to strangle her with his hand, and ended the crime by hanging her with his belt. After seeing Margareth dead in the bedroom, he thought he should disappear with the body. He unlatched the bathroom door for better mobility and placed his body on his back in the bathtub. He used the first objects that were at his disposal: razor blade, scissors and knife were the main ones used. He began to cut her breasts, then took out the muscles and cut the joints, so that her body would be smaller to hide it.

It is noteworthy that Francisco dismembered Margareth because he was afraid of the actions that would come after causing her death, thus concluding that he would have to hide her corpse. It took 3-4 hours to dismember the victim and put her in a bag (because he also knew that his friend who he shared his apartment with would be arriving). When Caio arrived, Francisco said he had something to tell and said he had killed someone. He didn't say how or why, but he said the body was still in the apartment. He asked Caio for time so he could notify his mother and hire a lawyer. In fact, he traveled looking for his mother. When he arrived, he told a friend and didn't have the courage to talk about what had really happened, just stating that something serious had happened, asking her to tell her mother. Upon returning, his friend Caio had notified the Homicide Police, who arrested Francisco - he did not offer resistance to the arrestment at any time.

=== Second Murder - Ângela Silva ===
Ten years after that brutal crime, he was released for good behavior, but Francisco attacked again: in September 1976 he raped and tried to strangle the prostitute Rosemarie Michelucci, in a motel in the East Side of São Paulo, but she defended herself with kicks, bites, punches and screams, managing to get rid of him. Despite being stabbed, she survived. Chico managed to escape.

A month later, in October, he returned to Boca do Lixo. In a bar, he met the prostitute Ângela Silva, known as "Wig Woman". After drinking heavily, they agreed on the price of the program, and he took her to an apartment he lived in, rented a few months previously, on Rio Branco avenue, a few minutes from where they were. After the act, he beat and strangled her with his belt. Already dead, he dismembered her, but this time he dismembered his victim with much greater care and tried to throw some pieces down the toilet.

After killing and dismembering her he couldn't get her whole body into the toilet. To dispose of it, he put pieces in a cardboard box. He fled to the city of Rio de Janeiro, but he told his friend Caio and asked again for time to tell his family and hire a lawyer. Caio, already aware of the crime, was not sure what to do and contacted the Homicide Police. Chico Picadinho was arrested 28 days later, in a square in Duque de Caxias (Rio de Janeiro), in Baixada Fluminense, while reading a magazine that recounted his life of crimes.

At the time, the exhibition by the press of his victim's photos cut into pieces greatly sensitized public opinion, leading to the criminal being condemned to 30 years in prison.

== Prison ==
Arrested for the first crime on August 5, 1966, Francisco was sentenced to 18 years in prison for first-degree murder, plus another 2 years and 6 months for the destruction of the corpse. Subsequently, his sentence was commuted to 14 years and 4 months of imprisonment. In prison, he studied, worked directly with the prison board, and even got married. In 1974, eight years after the first crime, he was released, and the opinion carried out by the Criminal Biotypology Institute excluded the diagnosis of psychopath personality.

Two years and five months after obtaining his freedom, Francisco committed the second murder, in 1976. At the trial, his defense claimed that his motive for the crime was not vile, noting that Francisco suffered from mental insanity. At that moment, Francisco who was being charged, after being examined, was considered semi-imputable, as he was a bearer of a complex type of psychopath personality. Even so, the Sentencing Council condemned Francisco – for four to three – to 22 years and 6 months of imprisonment.

In 1994, Francisco underwent a detailed psychiatric examination, which culminated in the establishment of a mental health incident and his subsequent removal to the House of Custody and Treatment of Taubaté, in order to obtain medical treatment. The Public Prosecution, in turn, ordered for the decree of interdiction in a closed psychiatric establishment.

The defense lawyer still struggled to obtain freedom, due to the total fulfillment of the sentence, but the Federal Supreme Court, in the judgment of the Ordinary Appeal in Habeas Corpus No. 82.924-4/SP, unanimously dismissed it.

In another attempt, Francisco's defense lawyer tried to obtain the lifting the ban with consequent hospitalization removal, under the argument that, in fact, Chico was being punished with life sentence, which does not exist in Brazil's legal system. However, the request was rejected in the first degree.

In the judgment of the appeal, the São Paulo's Court of Justice, on November 25, 2015, understood that the interdiction of mental patients with a very serious pathology is not equal to life sentence, as it does not aim to punish for the infractions, but rather deprive from social living those who suffer a very serious mental illness. In this case, the judges understood that there would be sure proof of the dissociative personality of the person being interdicted, as well as a serious history of violence, thus maintaining the hospitalization.

On March 1, 2017, he was released by the magistrate Sueli Zeraik de Oliveira Armani, from the 1st Criminal Execution Court of Taubaté. Francisco da Costa Rocha was imprisoned in the House of Custody in Taubaté due to a civil interdiction requested by the Public Prosecution and accepted by the São Paulo's Court on December 14, 1998. Chico had served his sentence in full on November 21, 1998.

In the decision, dated March 1st, 2017, the magistrate Sueli Zeraik de Oliveira Armani highlighted that Chico confirmed his intention to “integrate socially, showing himself to be very secure and determined in this purpose, as well as quite logical in his reasoning developed and coherent in his placements”. According to tests, there is a diagnosis of “nonspecific personality disorder”, but his conduct is classified as “excellent” by the House of Custody's direction.

The magistrate Sueli Zeraik de Oliveira Armani classified Chico's arrestment as “absolutely illegal”, as it is due only to a civil interdiction and exceeds the 30 years prescribed by Brazil's law. The interdiction decision specified that Chico should remain in the prison unit temporarily, however, according to the magistrate, “from the temporary that was deliberated there, it has been twenty years, moving from there to perpetuity”. “Nothing more unfair, illegal and arbitrary,” she wrote in her decision.

For the São Paulo's Public Prosecution, who had asked for his interdiction, Chico has already paid off his debt to the courts. “He has already served the entire sentence imposed on him in terms of quantity and he is only kept in prison due to a civil interdiction. As he doesn't have any living relatives, nor where to go, he ended up staying at the House of Custody”, said prosecutor Luiz Marcelo Negrini.

In May 2017, the court Judge Ricardo Dip, from the Special Chamber of the São Paulo Court of Justice, decided that the prerogative to consider any urgent decision on the case is of the magistrate of the Family Court Jorge Passos Rodrigues' concern. It was Rodrigues who, on the contrary to the decision of the Criminal Execution Court, decided to maintain custody. According to the magistrate, Chico Picadinho, at the time with 75 years old, was serving a sentence for medical purposes, since in the 1970s, in a medical report, he was appointed as a sadistic and psychopathic personality. In the decision, the magistrate affirms that the House of Custody is the "best place to civilly house Francisco, with a record that he is adapted to the daily life, discipline, and timely and effectively receiving psychiatric medication". The decision of Jorge Passos Rodrigues was evaluated by the São Paulo's Court of Justice, where the conflict of jurisdiction was taken, and reaffirmed as a precautionary decision.

Chico Picadinho was a law student at the time of the crimes, though now spends his days painting. He committed his crimes under the influence of Dostoevsky's novel Crime and Punishment, whom he called god in an interview. He is also fond of Kafka.
