= Museu do Ipiranga =

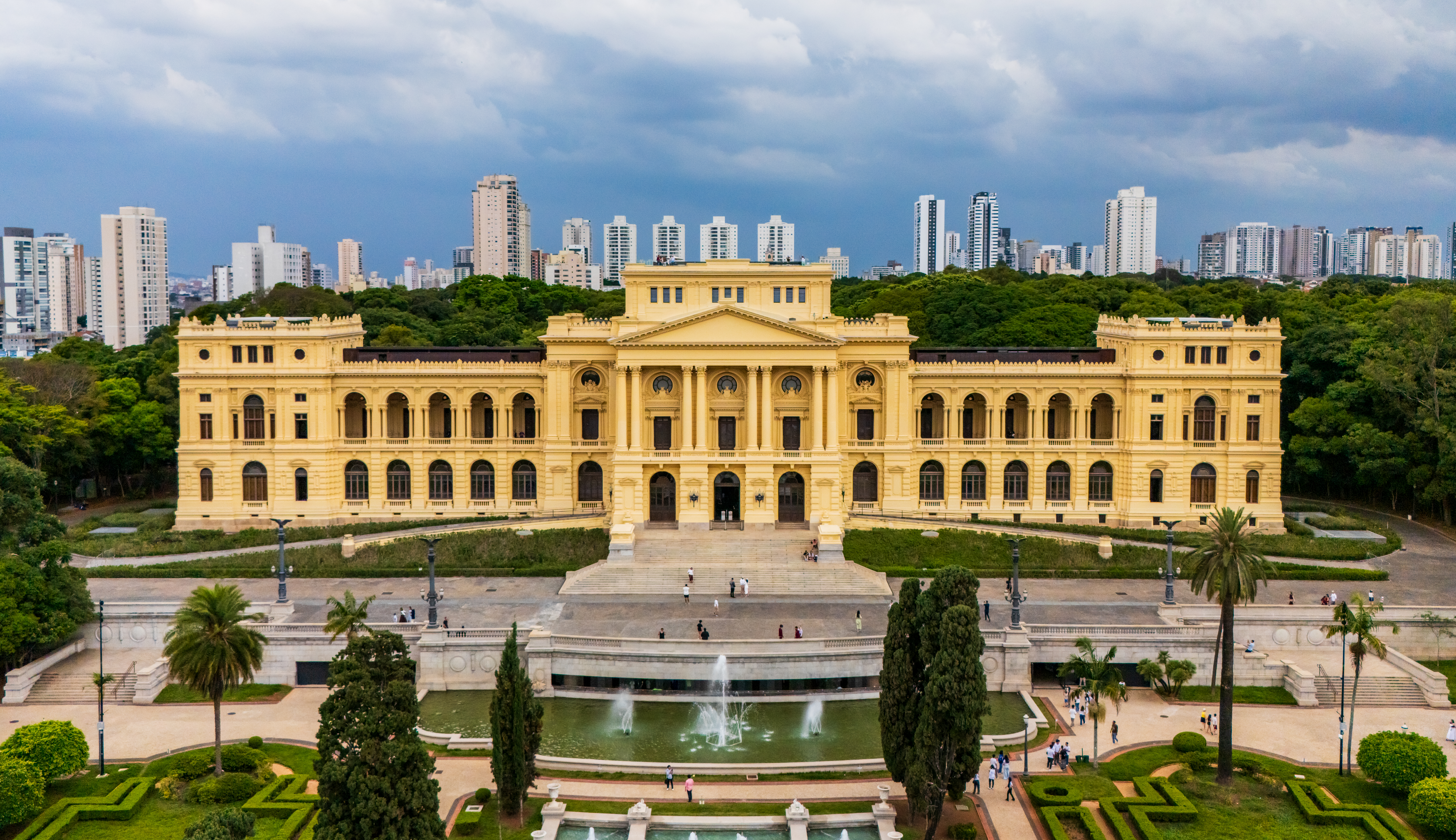
- Established: September 7, 1895; 130 years ago
- Location: Ipiranga, São Paulo, Brazil
- Coordinates: 23°35′08″S 46°36′35″W
- Type: History and art museum
- Director: Rosaria Ono
- Curator: Paulo Garcez
- Public transit access: Alto do Ipiranga; Ipiranga
- Website: museudoipiranga.org.br and acervoonline.mp.usp.br

The Museu Paulista of the University of São Paulo, commonly known as Museu do Ipiranga, is a Brazilian history museum located near the place where Emperor Pedro I is stated to have proclaimed Brazil's independence on the banks of the Ipiranga Brook, located in the Southeast region of the city of São Paulo — then known as the "Caminho do Mar" — or "road to the seashore". It contains a huge collection of furniture, documents and historically relevant artwork, especially relating to the Brazilian Empire era.

The most famous artwork in the collection is the 1888 painting Independência ou Morte (Independence or Death) by Pedro Américo.

A few months after the Brazilian Declaration of Independence, people started to suggest a monument on the site where the declaration took place, although they were not sure about what sort of memorial construction to build. In 1884, Italian architect Tommaso Gaudenzio Bezzi, who was hired to develop the project, chose to build an eclectic-styled building similar to the French Palace of Versailles with impressive and perfectly manicured gardens and fountain.

The museum closed in August 2013 for extensive restoration and modernisation. In September 2022, it re-opened to the public.

== Design and construction ==
In 1884, Italian architect Tommaso Gaudenzio Bezzi was chosen to design a monumental building to be built at the place where Brazilian Independence would have been proclaimed. The 123 metres (404 ft) long palace was inspired by a Renaissance palace and is considered an example of Eclectic architecture. The museum was opened to the public on September 7, 1895, six years after the Proclamation of the Republic. In 1909, Belgian landscape designer Arsenio Puttermans projected the gardens around the main building, which were later redesigned by landscape designer Reinaldo Dierberger in the 1920s.

A reorganization of the collection was instituted in 1922 by Afonso d'Escragnolle Taunay at the time of the Centenary of Independence of Brazil, with a special emphasis on the history of the state of São Paulo. Paintings and sculptures related to the history of Brazil were installed in the lobby, grand staircase and Great Hall.

A satellite museum, the Republican Museum "Itu Convention" (Museu Republicano "Convenção de Itu") opened on April 18, 1923 in Itu, a city in the interior of the state of São Paulo. The museum is located in the family home of Almeida Prado, where the Republican Party of São Paulo was founded in 1873. The Itu museum remains under the administration of the Paulista Museum and has a collection that focuses on the history of Brazil in the late 19th and early 20th century.

== Collections ==
The Museu Paulista has a large collection of objects, furniture, maps, and works of art with historical relevance, especially those that have some relationship with the Independence of Brazil and the corresponding historical period. One of the most well-known works in his collection is the painting (Portuguese: Independência ou Morte ("Independence or Death"), painted by the artist Pedro Américo in 1888. The museum has significant, collection of photographs, including those by Militão Augusto de Azevedo (1837–1905), Guilherme Gaensly (1843–1928), and Werner Haberkorn (1907–1997). The museum has a facsimile of one of the oldest maps of Brazil, the Map of Céspedes Xeria, produced in 1628. In addition to exhibitions, the activities of the Ipiranga Museum include educational programs, courses, and scientific research. The collection of the museum continues to expand via donations or acquisitions. An important part of the activities of the museum involves physical conservation, study, and documentation of the collection.

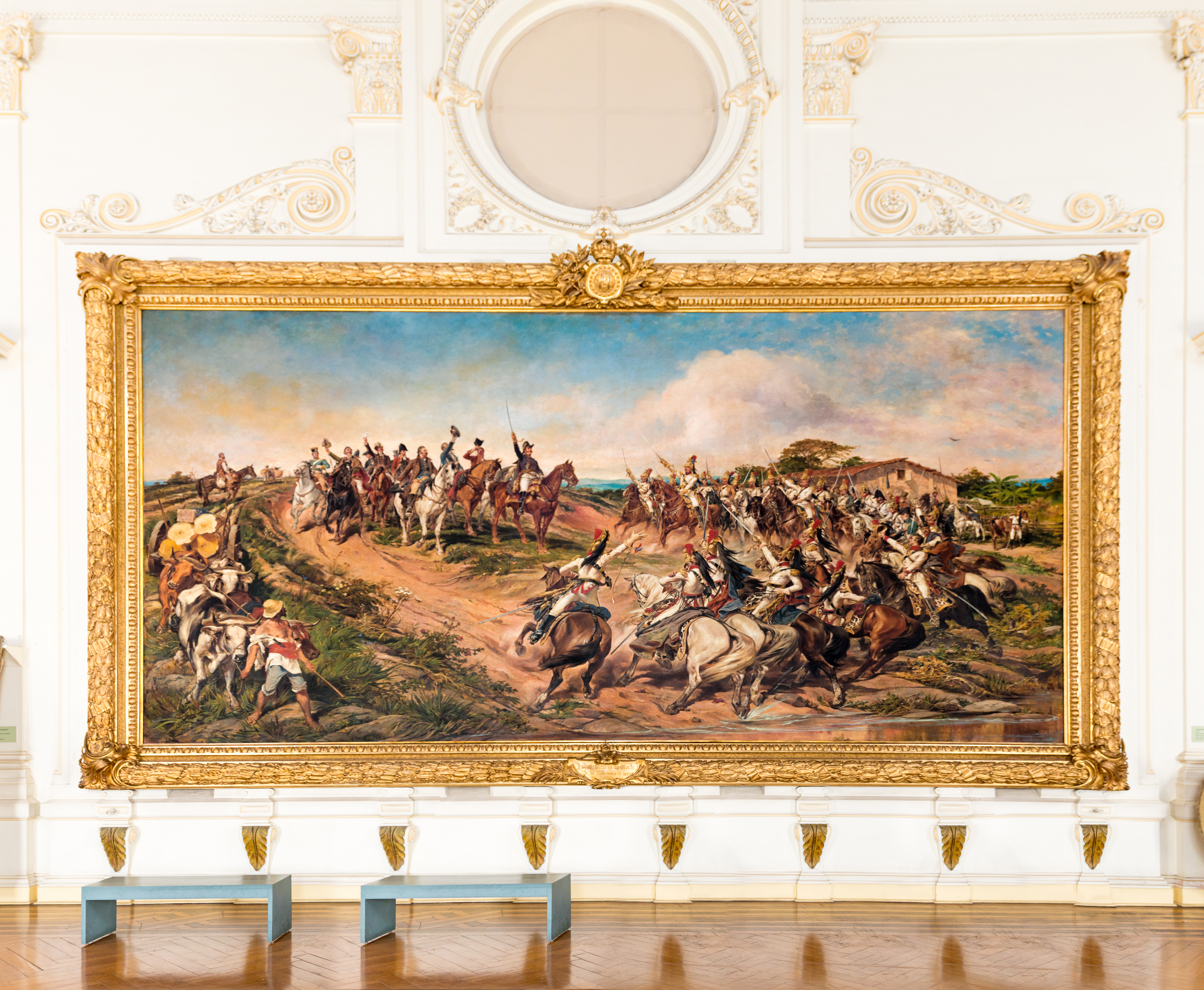
(Portuguese: Independência ou Morte ("Independence or Death"), Pedro Américo, 1888

== See also ==
- List of Baroque residences
- Buildings inspired by Versailles
- Eclectic architecture
- Museum of Archeology and Ethnology of the University of São Paulo
