= Trichromy =

Application of color theory

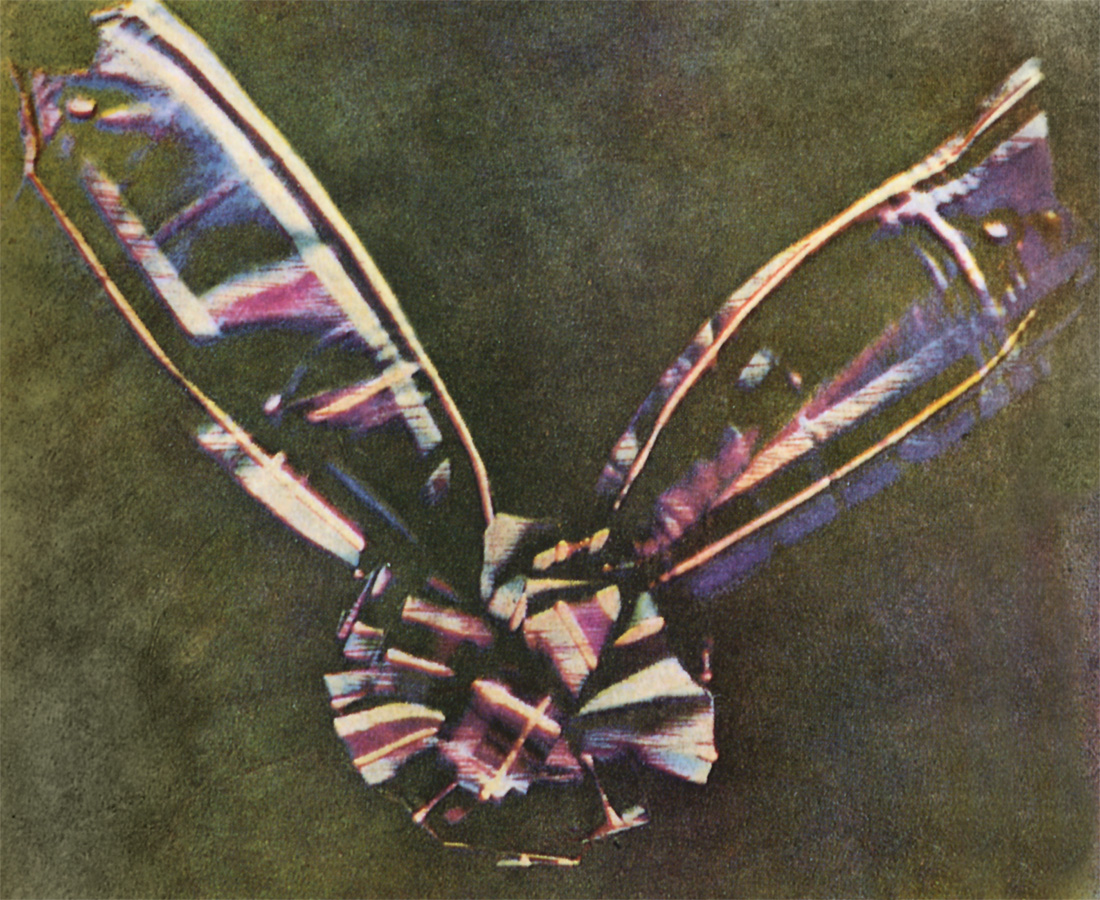
The first color photograph made by the three-color method suggested by James Clerk Maxwell in 1855, taken in 1861 by Thomas Sutton. The subject is a colored ribbon, usually described as a tartan ribbon.

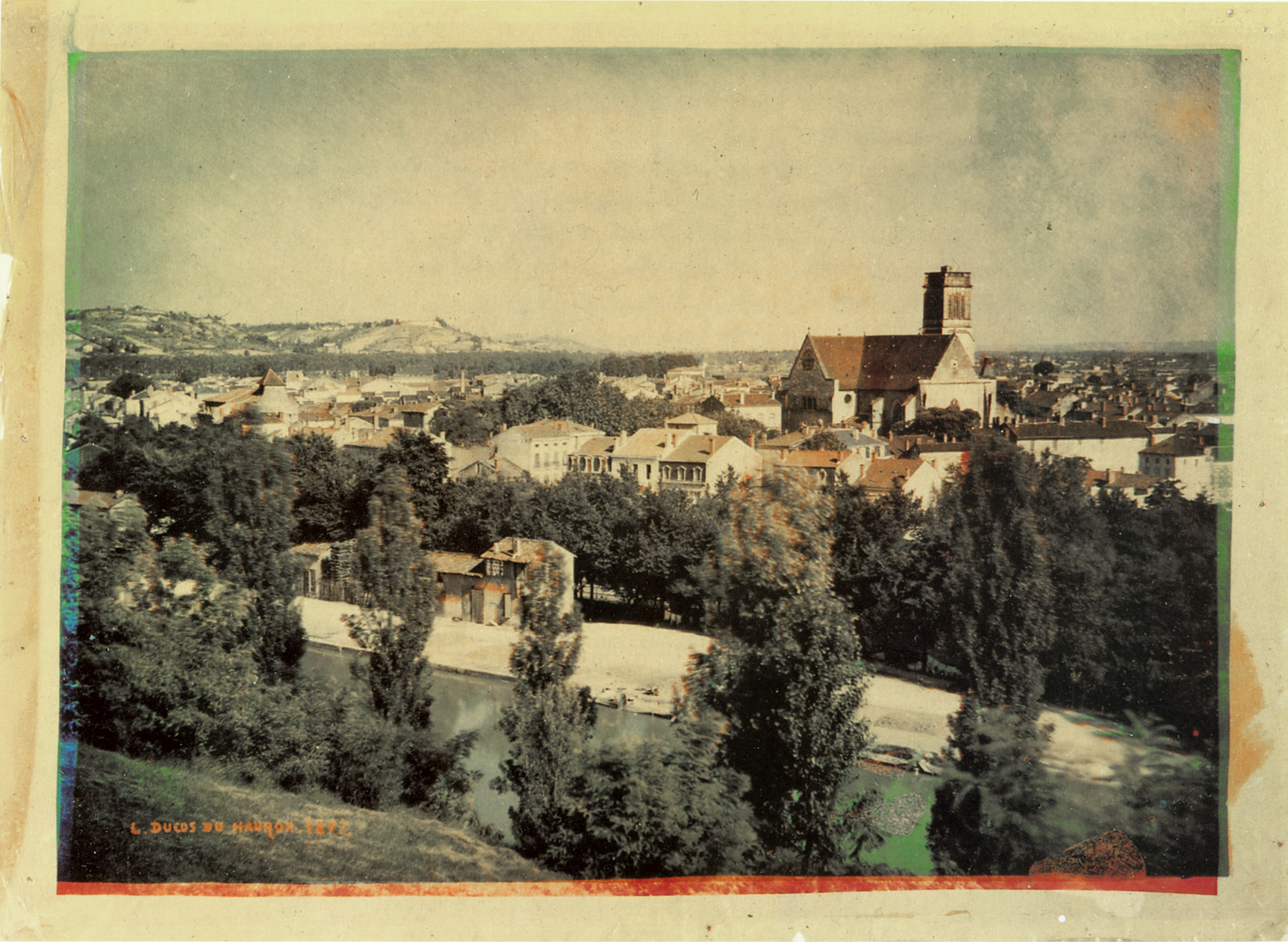
1877 triple negative printed using trichromy method also known as three colour process, by Louis Ducos du Hauron.

Trichromy is the colour theory by which any colour can be reproduced solely combining the three primary colours. It relies on human trichromacy.

It is also referred to as the three colour process in photography. French histories of photography have claimed that Charles Cros and Ducos du Hauron simultaneously invented its application to photography around 1868, though English histories of photography have claimed that it was first suggested by J. C. Maxwell and defectively demonstrated with the help of Thomas Sutton in 1861 (according to Maxwell himself, Sutton's widespread photochemistry wasn't sensitive enough to red and green light).
