= Timeline of strikes in 2017 =

Strikes in 2017

A number of labour strikes, labour disputes, and other industrial actions occurred in 2017.

== Background ==
A labor strike is a work stoppage, caused by the mass refusal of employees to work, usually in response to employee grievances, such as low pay or poor working conditions. Strikes can also take place to demonstrate solidarity with workers in other workplaces or to pressure governments to change policies.

== Timeline ==
=== Continuing strikes from 2016 ===
- 2016–2017 Kashmir unrest
- Northern Virginia airport workers' strikes
- 2016–2019 United Kingdom railway strikes
- 2016–2017 video game voice actor strike

=== January ===
- 2017 Ivory Coast public sector strike
- 2017 KCL cleaners' strike, by cleaners at King's College, London.

=== February ===
- Day Without Immigrants, in protest against American president Donald Trump's plans for deportations and construction of a border wall with Mexico.
- 2017 Military Police of Espírito Santo strike, over low salaries.
- 2017–2019 transport strikes in the Philippines

=== March ===
- Spectrum strike
- University of Puerto Rico strikes, 2017

=== April ===
- 2017 Brazilian general strike, in protest against the 2017 Brazil labour reform

=== May ===
- 2017 Quebec construction strike

=== June ===
- 2017 Kenya nurses' strike
- 2017 Greek sanitation workers' strike
- 2017 Spain transportation strikes

=== July ===
- 2017 British Columbia Coca-Cola strike
- 2017 Costa Rica judicial workers’ strike
- 2017 Toronto Pearson International Airport strike, by baggage handlers at the Toronto Pearson International Airport in Canada.

=== September ===
- 2017 Denmark women's national football team strike, after the Danish Football Association attempting to stop classifying women's national team players as employees

=== October ===
- 2017 Catalan general strike, pro-independence strike following the 2017 Catalan independence referendum
- 2017 PIMS strike, 25-day strike by workers at the Pakistan Institute of Medical Sciences calling for the reversal of the 2013 merger between the PIMS and Shaheed Zulfiqar Ali Bhutto Medical University.
- 2017 Spanish consulate in Sydney strike, by staff at the Spanish consulate in Sydney over low wages.

=== November ===
- 2017 Sanmina Chennai strike by workers at a Sanmina Corporation factory in Chennai, India.
- 2007–08 Writers Guild of America strike

=== December ===
- 2017 Blaise Diagne International Airport strike, by workers at the newly-opened Blaise Diagne International Airport in Senegal.
- 2017 Ford Craiova strike, wildcat strike by autoworkers at a Ford factory in Craiova, Romania.
- 2017 Icelandair strike
- 2017–2018 Moroccan protests, following the death of two miners in Jerada.
- 2017 Sanmina Shenzhen strike, by workers at a Sanmina Corporation factory in Shenzhen, China, over factory relocation plans.
- 2017 Swaziland Revenue Authority strike, by staff at the Swaziland Revenue Authority in Eswatini.
- 2017 Teva strike, by Teva Pharmaceuticals workers in Israel.
- VCUarts adjunct workers' protests, by adjunct professors at Virginia Commonwealth University in the United States over low pay, lack of benefits, and long working hours.

== List of lockouts in 2017 ==
- 2017-18 Nadi International Airport lockout, at the Nadi International Airport in Fiji, after airport workers held a meeting to discuss an 11-year pay freeze and sexual harassment allegations.

== Commentary ==
According to the Office for National Statistics, there were 79 work stoppages in the United Kingdom in 2017, with 276,000 working days lost and 33,000 workers involved. This marked a new record for the lowest number of strikes in a single year in the UK since the ONS began keeping records in 1981. 68% of the working days lost were lost in the transport and storage industry. In the United States, the Bureau of Labor Statistics tracked 7 major work stoppages in 2017, the second-lowest since it began keeping records in 1947. In South Africa, the Department of Employment and Labour tracked 132 work stoppages in 2017, an increase of 10 from 2016, involving a total of 125‚000 workers.
