= Military Police (Brazil) =

State police force of Brazil

Military Police Polícia Militar
- Insignia of the Military Police used since 1957.
- Abbreviation: PM

Agency overview
- Formed: 1809
- Employees: 385,883 active personnel (2020)

Jurisdictional structure
- Operations jurisdiction: Brazil
- General nature: Gendarmerie

Operational structure
- Agency executive: Governors of the States, Commander
- Parent agency: Military Reserve Force of Brazilian Army

Notables
- Person: Joaquim José da Silva Xavier, for Patron
- Significant operation: 1828 - Mercenary Revolt (Royal Guard Police of Rio de Janeiro) 1835 - Ragamuffin War 1835 - Cabanagem 1835 - Malê Revolt 1838 - Balaiada 1848 - Praieira Revolt 1851 - Ronco da Abelha Revolt 1864 - Paraguayan War 1874 - Quebra-Quilos Revolt 1874 - Revolt of the Muckers 1893 - Revolt of the Navy 1893 - Federalist Revolution 1893 - War of Canudos 1920 - Fight against the Cangaço 1904 - Vaccine Revolt 1912 - Contestado War 1922 - Tenente Revolts 1924 - Revolts of 1924 1925 - Prestes Column 1930 - Revolution of 1930 1932 - Revolution of 1932 1935 - Communist Revolt 1967 - Guerrilla Warfare 1980 - Fights against narcotraffickers 2006 - 2006 São Paulo violence outbreak 2010 - 2010 Rio de Janeiro Security Crisis 2017 - 2017 Espírito Santo violence outbreak
- Anniversary: 21 April

Military Police, (Note: Portuguese: Polícia Militar, IPA: [poˈlisi.ɐ miliˈtaʁ, -sjɐ -].) also known as PM, (Note: Pronounced [peˈemi].) are the uniformed preventive state police of the states and Federal District of Brazil. The Military Police units are the main ostensive police force at the state level and are responsible for policing and maintaining the public order. Their formations, rules and uniforms vary depending on the state. Investigative work and forensics are undertaken by the Civil Police of each state.

All state Military Police and Military Firefighters Corps are classed as reserve troops and ancillary forces of the Brazilian Army. In time of war (or other emergencies) the military police forces can be pressed into federal service. Thus are organized in a military manner, following military hierarchy and ranks and in case of crimes or misconduct, they are tried in state military courts instead of the common (or civil) courts. But they remain distinct from the provosts belonging to the other services within the Brazilian Military: the Army Police (Portuguese: Polícia do Exército, PE) for the Army, Air Force Police (Portuguese: Polícia da Aeronáutica, PA) for the Air Force and similar units in the Brazilian Marine Corps for the Brazilian Navy.

The Military Police was founded in 1809 by the Portuguese Crown with the Military Division of the Royal Police Guard in Rio de Janeiro, based on the model of the Gendarmerie created in France: a public security force that combined police and military functions. In most provinces they were named Public Forces (Portuguese: Força Pública) or Police Corps (Portuguese: Corpos Policiais). After the Proclamation of the Republic, these police forces were subject to state authorities, where they had a role not only in law enforcement, but also in warfare, to face the various revolts and rebellions during the period of the Old Republic. These "small state armies" had larger contingents than the federal military forces themselves — the Public Force of São Paulo, for example, had artillery and military aviation divisions — and were more loyal to state governments, especially local oligarchs and "colonels". The name "Military Police" was only standardized in 1946 under the regime of Getúlio Vargas, with the new Constitution of 1946 after the Vargas Era of the Estado Novo (1937-1945), which had the objective of limiting the military capacity of the Public Forces in order to focus on being exclusively police forces. All federated units adopted the term, with the exception of Rio Grande do Sul, which still maintains the name Military Brigade (Portuguese: Brigada Militar) in its police force.

In 2004 the National Public Security Force (Portuguese: Força Nacional de Segurança Pública) was created to handle major security crisis. The unit, which is composed of the most qualified Military Police personnel from all federal states, is deployed in cases of major security crisis to augment local security forces by the request of local authorities.

== History ==
The first militarized police in Portugal (when Brazil was still a colony) was the Royal Police Guard of Lisbon (Portuguese: Guarda Real de Polícia de Lisboa), established in 1801; which was followed by the model of the National Gendarmerie (French: Gendarmerie Nationale) of France, created in 1791.

When the Portuguese Royal Family was transferred to Brazil, the Royal Police Guard of Lisbon remained in Portugal, and another equivalent was created in Rio de Janeiro, under the name of Military Division of the Royal Guard Police of Rio de Janeiro, in 1809.

With the abdication of Emperor Pedro I in 1831, the Regency held reformulations on the Brazilian Armed Forces. The Royal Guard Police of Rio de Janeiro was abolished, and replaced by the Municipal Guard Corps of Volunteers; a type of security force similar to the French National Guard. The same law allowed each province to establish its own Guard of Volunteers.

In 1834 Pedro I died in Portugal and this reduced the fear in Brazil of a reunification of the kingdoms. The Guard of Volunteers were then transformed into Province Police Corps, with professional troops. The Police Corps were created with the same structure as the Army, and to serve as reserve troops when necessary.

With the fall of the Empire, the First Brazilian Republic adopted a constitution based on the United States' one, where the federal states have a large degree of autonomy. The Police Corps began to be administered by the states and became small state armies, with infantry, cavalry, artillery, and later, even air forces. This danger to national security remained until the end of World War II, with the deposition of the dictatorial government of Getúlio Vargas.

After World War II, the Military Police became a more "traditional" police force, similar to a gendarmerie, subject to the states.

== Structure ==
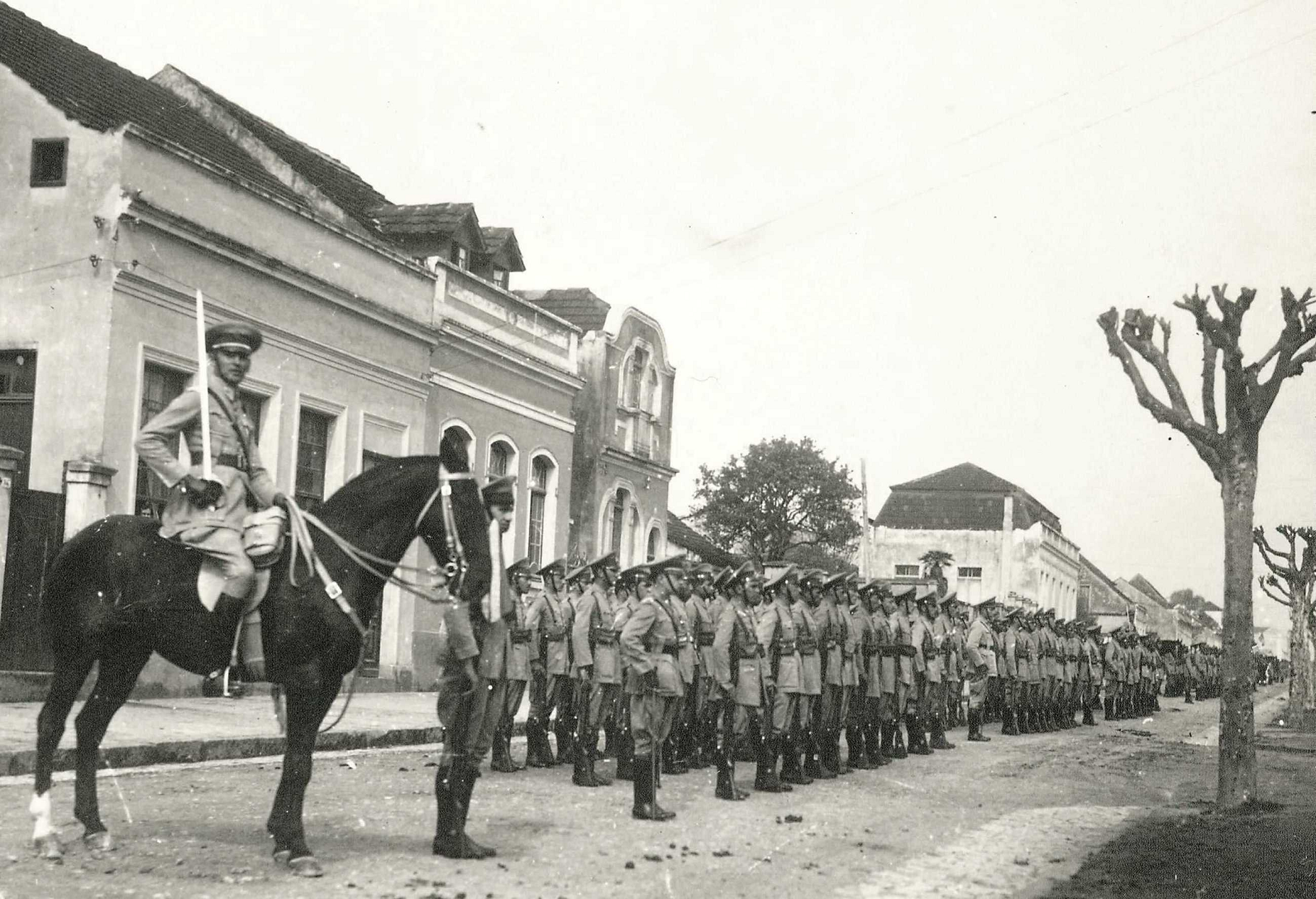
Military Police of Paraná - 1938.

=== Organization ===
The Secretariat for Public Security (Secretaria de Segurança Pública—SSP) supervises all state police activities. The SSPs are subordinate to the National Council of Public Security (Conselho Nacional de Segurança Pública - CONASP).

According to Article 144 of the federal constitution, the function of the Military Police "is to serve as a conspicuous police force and to preserve public order." The Military Police of any state are organized as a military force and have a military-based rank structure. Training is weighted more heavily toward police matters, but counterinsurgency training is also included. Arms and equipment of state forces include machine guns and armored cars, in addition to other items generally associated with police.

Article 144 of the constitution stipulates that: "The Military Police forces and the Military Firefighters Corps, ancillary forces and army reserve, are subordinate, along with the Civil Police forces, to the governors of the states, Federal District, and territories." Between 1969 and 1985, the Ministry of Army has controlled the Military Police during periods of declared national emergency. Before 1930 these forces were under individual state control, and known as "the governors' armies." They sometimes outnumbered regular troops in many states. In 1932, after Constitutionalist Revolution in São Paulo, the Federal Army took steps to reverse this situation. In 1964 most Military Police members were on the side of the successful conspirators.

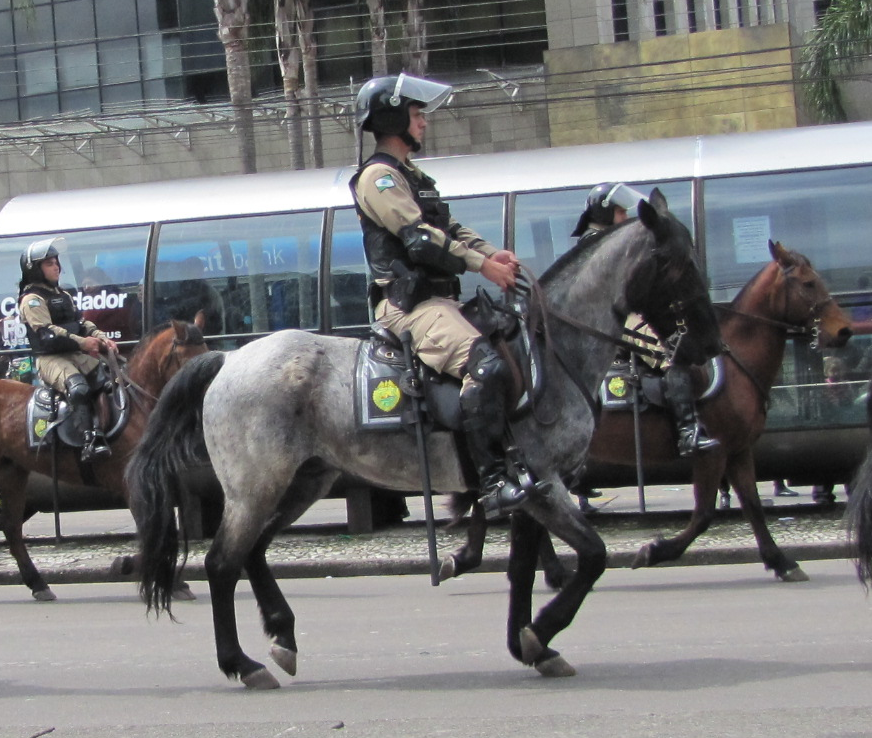
Mounted Police officers of PMPR - 2010.

During military dictatorship, Military Police units were often commanded by active-duty army officers, but that has occurred less frequently as professional police officers have achieved higher ranks and positions. The commandant of a state's Military Police is usually a Colonel. The command is divided into police regions, which deploy police battalions and companies. Firefighting is also a Military Police function in some states, but they are organized in separate units called Corpo de Bombeiros Militar. State traffic police are either the State Highway Police (Polícia Rodoviária Estadual), or the Traffic Police (Polícia de Trânsito) in the larger cities. Both are part of the state Military Police.

=== Field organization ===
Military police are operationally structured into intermediate commands (area or specialized policing), battalions (Portuguese: Batalhão de Polícia Militar), companies (Portuguese: Companhia de Polícia Militar), platoons (Portuguese: Pelotão de Polícia Militar), and subdivided into detachments (Portuguese: Destacamento de Polícia Militar). The battalions are based in major urban centers, and their companies and platoons are distributed according to population density in cities.

There are also other intermediate denominations, such as: special groups, garrisons and also independent military police companies (CIPM or Cia PM Ind) which are at the same level of administrative autonomy as the battalions; having, however, less personnel and smaller policing areas.

The mounted police is organized into regiments (Portuguese: Regimento de Polícia Montada), subdivided into squadrons (Portuguese: Esquadrão de Polícia Montada) and platoons of mounted police (Portuguese: Pelotão de Polícia Montado).

=== Nomenclature ===
Throughout Brazil the Military Police is known by the acronym PM (for Policia Militar), followed by the abbreviation of the State, except in the State of Rio Grande do Sul, where the unit is known as BM (for Brigada Militar, "Military Brigade").

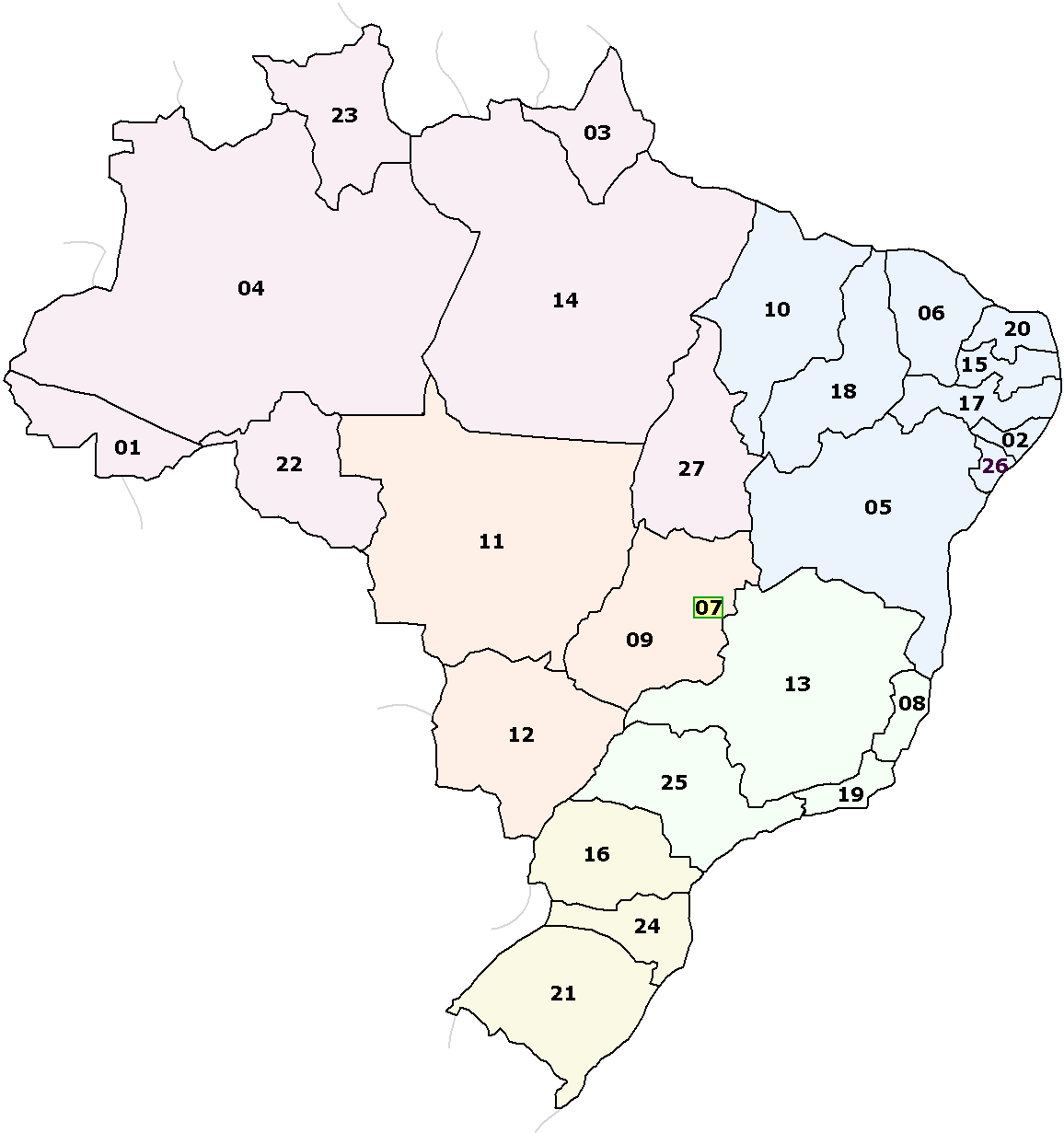
  - 01 . PMAC - Acre
  - 02 . PMAL - Alagoas
  - 03 . PMAP - Amapá
  - 04 . PMAM - Amazonas
  - 05 . PMBA - Bahia
  - 06 . PMCE - Ceará
  - 07 . PMDF - Distrito Federal
  - 08 . PMES - Espírito Santo
  - 09 . PMGO - Goiás
  - 10 . PMMA - Maranhão
  - 11 . PMMT - Mato Grosso
  - 12 . PMMS - Mato Grosso do Sul
  - 13 . PMMG - Minas Gerais
  - 14 . PMPA - Pará
  - 15 . PMPB - Paraíba
  - 16 . PMPR - Paraná
  - 17 . PMPE - Pernambuco
  - 18 . PMPI - Piauí
  - 19 . PMERJ -Rio de Janeiro
  - 20 . PMRN - Rio Grande do Norte
  - 21 . BMRS - Rio Grande do Sul
  - 22 . PMRO - Rondônia
  - 23 . PMRR - Roraima
  - 24 . PMSC - Santa Catarina
  - 25 . PMESP- São Paulo
  - 26 . PMSE - Sergipe
  - 27 . PMTO - Tocantins

=== Uniforms ===
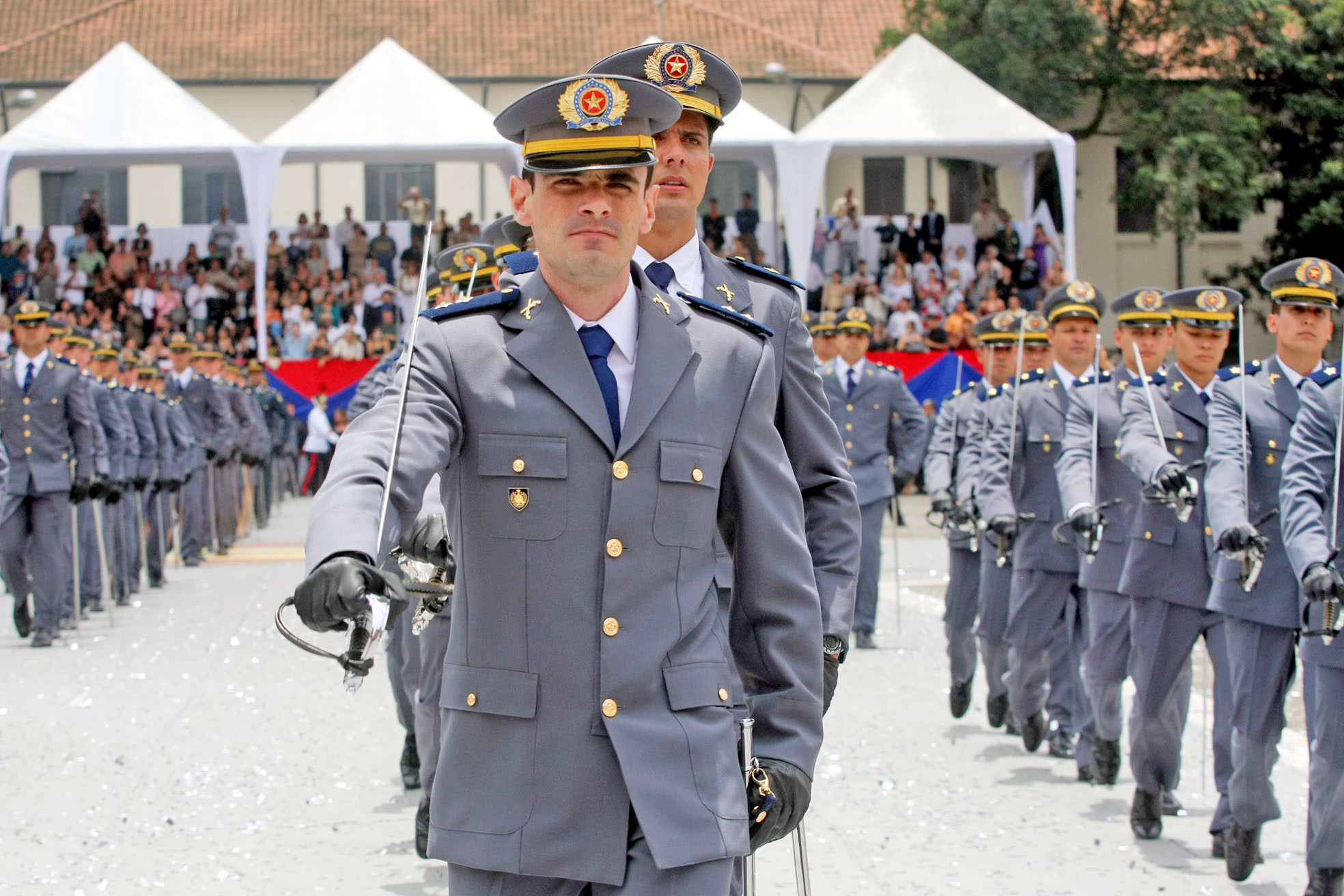
Graduation of Lieutenants at the Barro Branco Military Academy, of the Military Police of the São Paulo State.

The Brazilian Armed Forces inherited Portuguese military traditions and during the period of the Empire and part of the Republic, with few exceptions, dark blue uniforms were used. In 1903 the Brazilian Army opted for khaki colored field uniforms, later copied by the Military Police. In 1934 the Ministry of War established khaki as the color for all reserve forces.

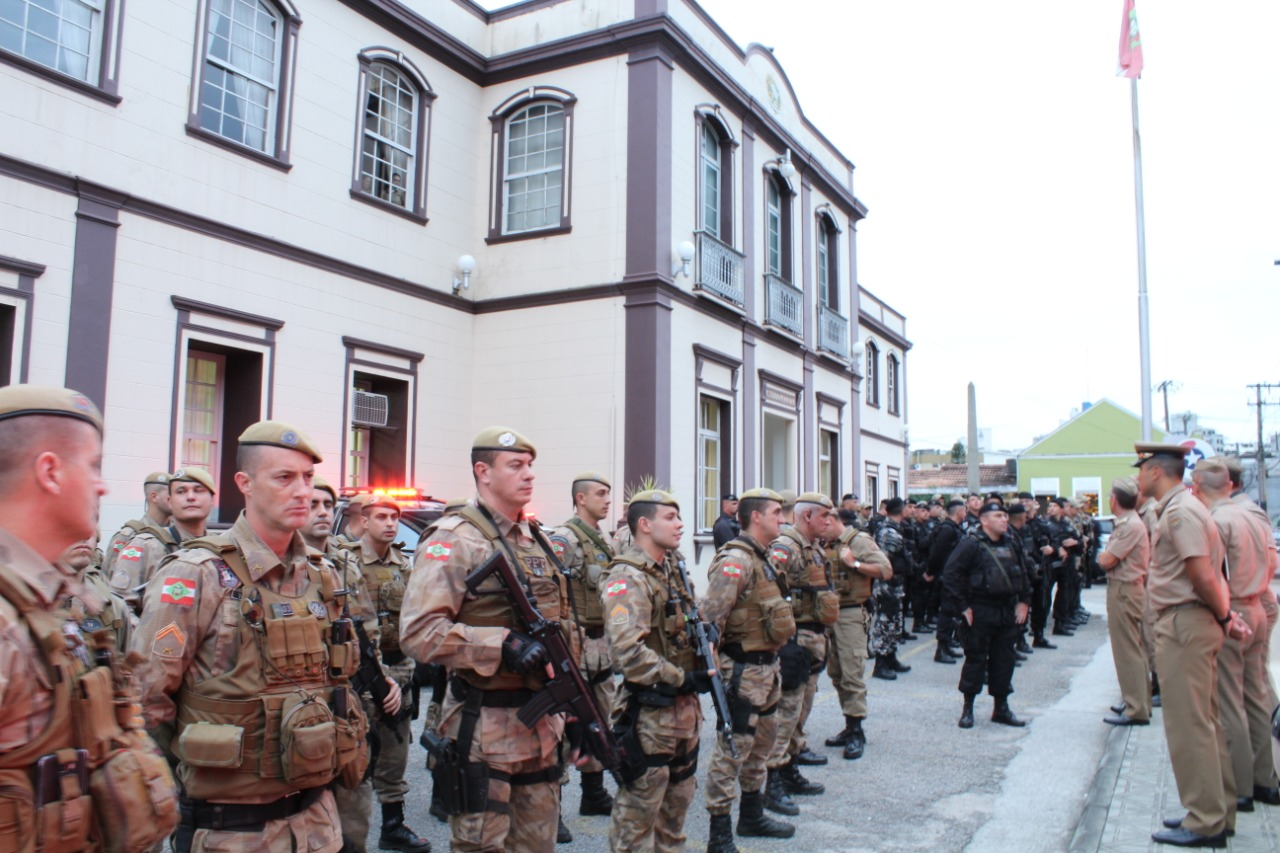
Military Police officers from the state of Santa Catarina in operational uniform.

After the Second World War, the Military Police had the autonomy to adopt its own uniforms, but most stayed with the khaki. During the Military Government in 1976, the Army suggested that the Military Police adopt the blue color (color of the uniform of the Military Police of the Federal District). Since then, some units have changed their uniforms while others have not.

Currently the color khaki (with variations to beige) and blue (with variations of gray to dark blue) prevail in the colors of the uniforms of the Military Police.

- Forces with khaki uniforms (includes green): BMRS, PMAL, PMBA, PMCE, PMGO, PMMG, PMPB, PMPR, PMPE, PMPI, PMRN, PMSC and PMTO.
- Forces with blue uniforms (includes Blue-grey):PMAC, PMAP, PMAM, PMDF, PMES, PMMA, PMMS, PMERJ, PMPA, PMRN, PMRO, PMRR, PMESP, PMMT and PMSE.

This applies only to service uniforms, not to the formal uniform, which has different variations.

=== Ranks ===
The Military Police of the Brazilian States have almost the same hierarchical ranking system of the Brazilian Army, but with different insignias and with no rank of "general", although the role of commanding general has status and military precedence equivalent to that of brigadier general.

Commanders

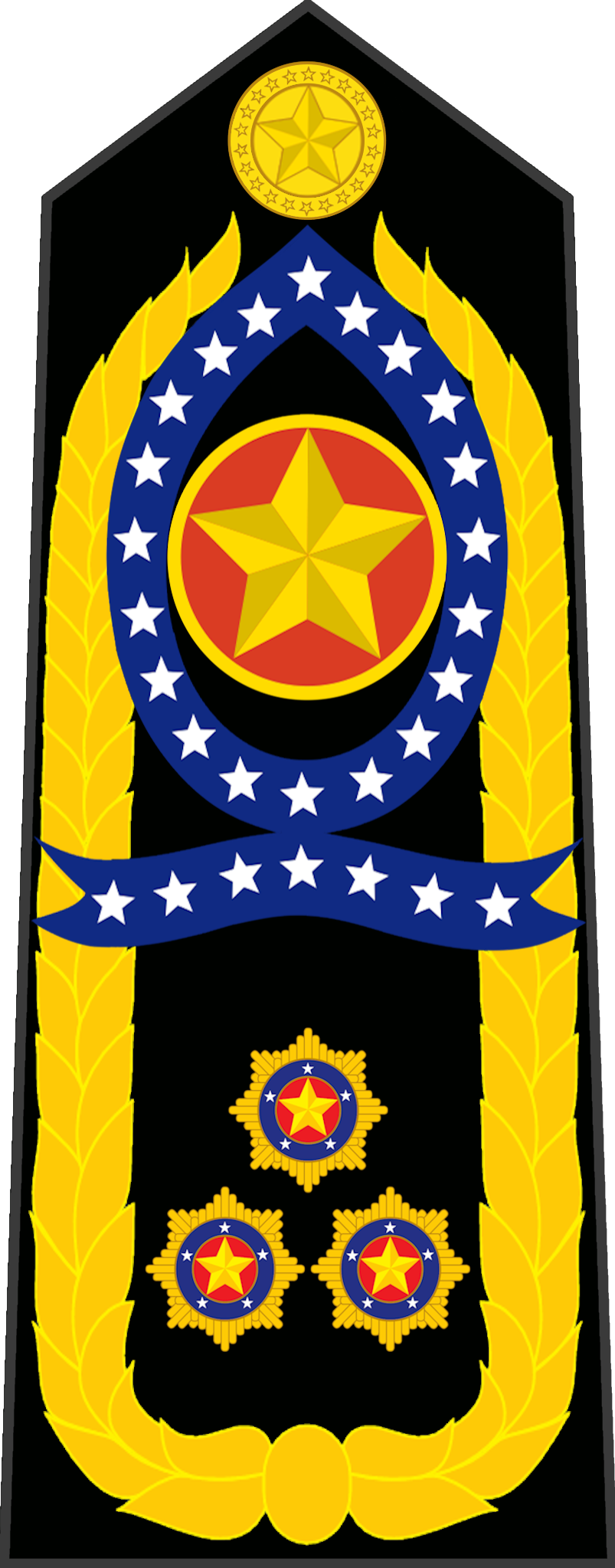
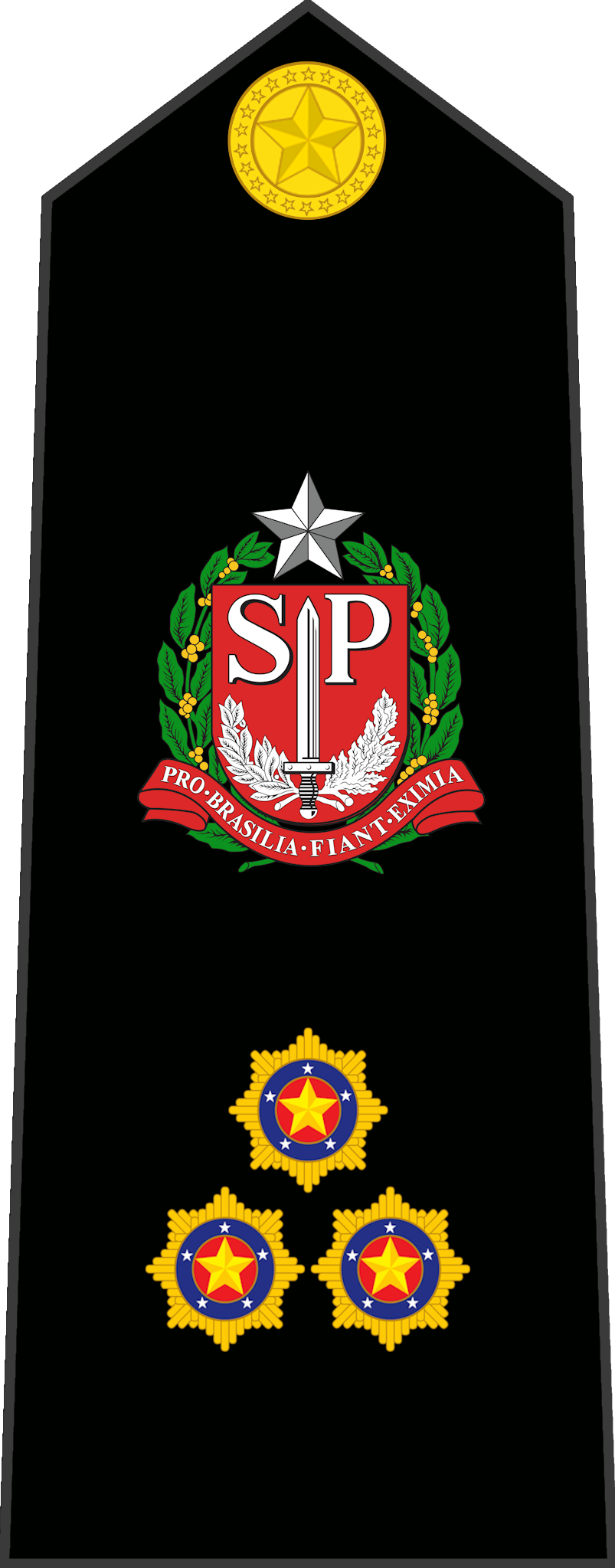
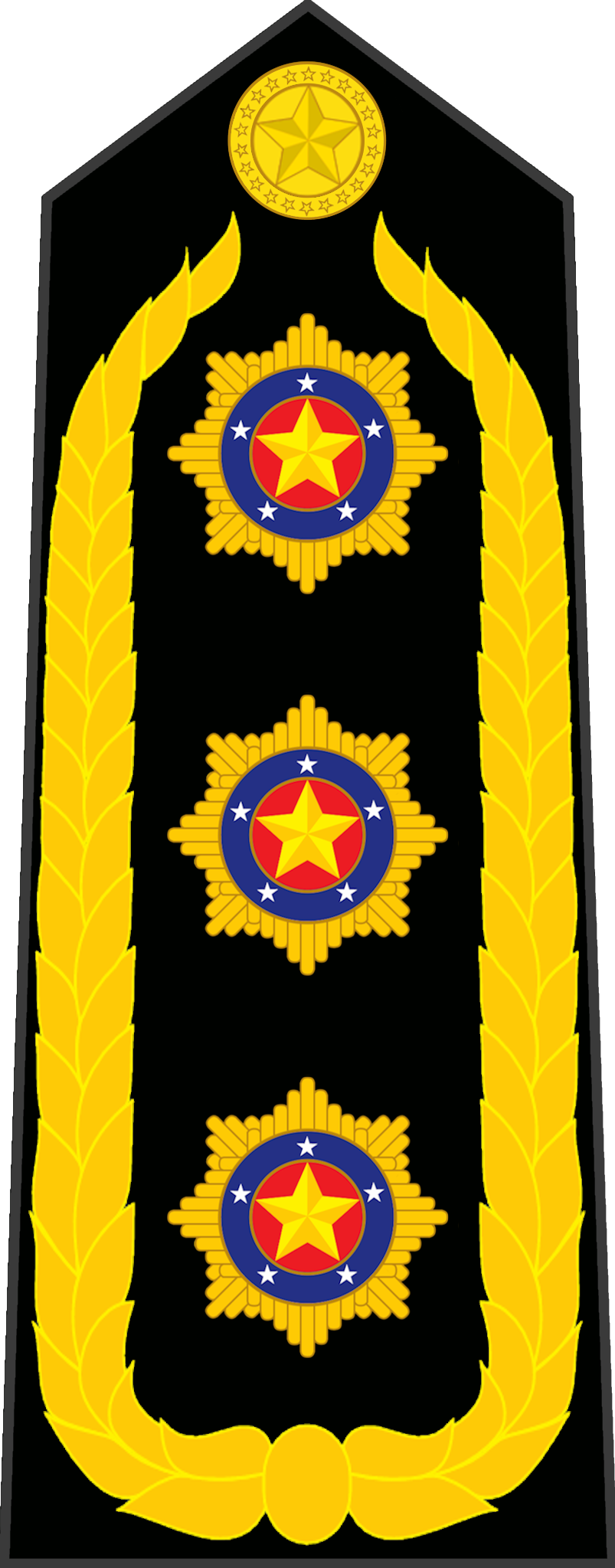
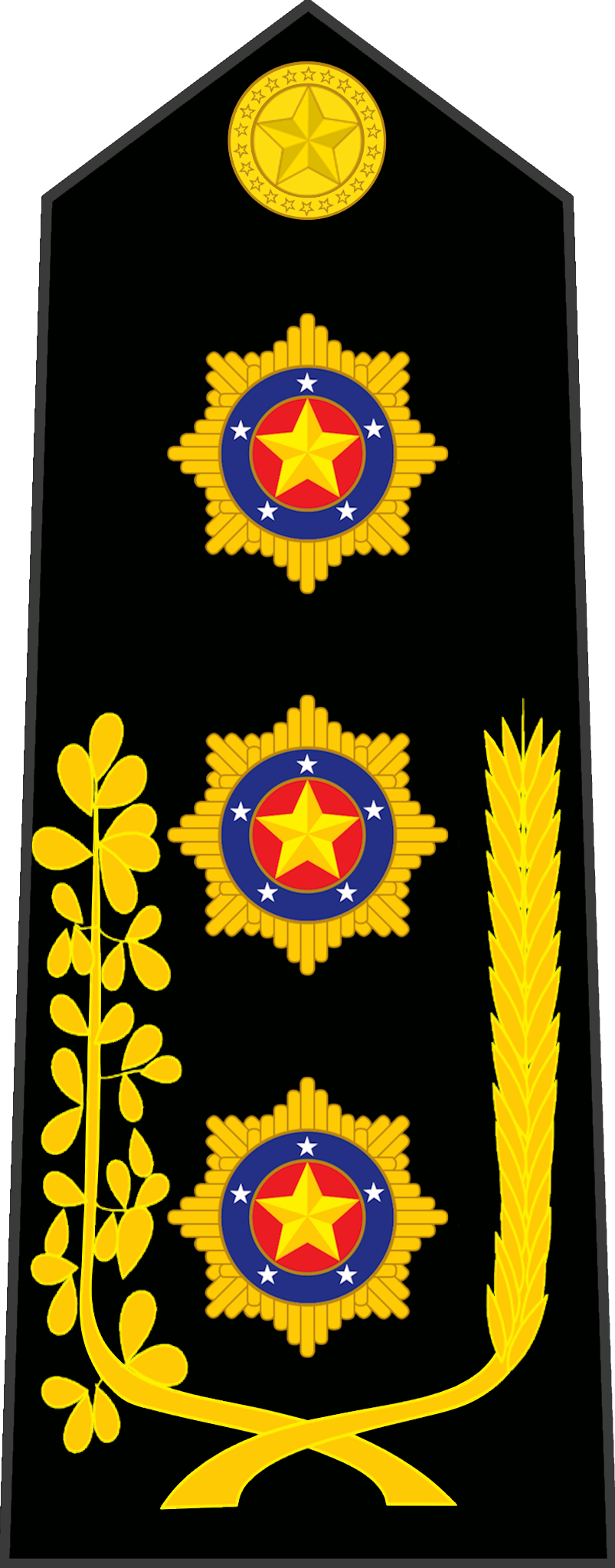
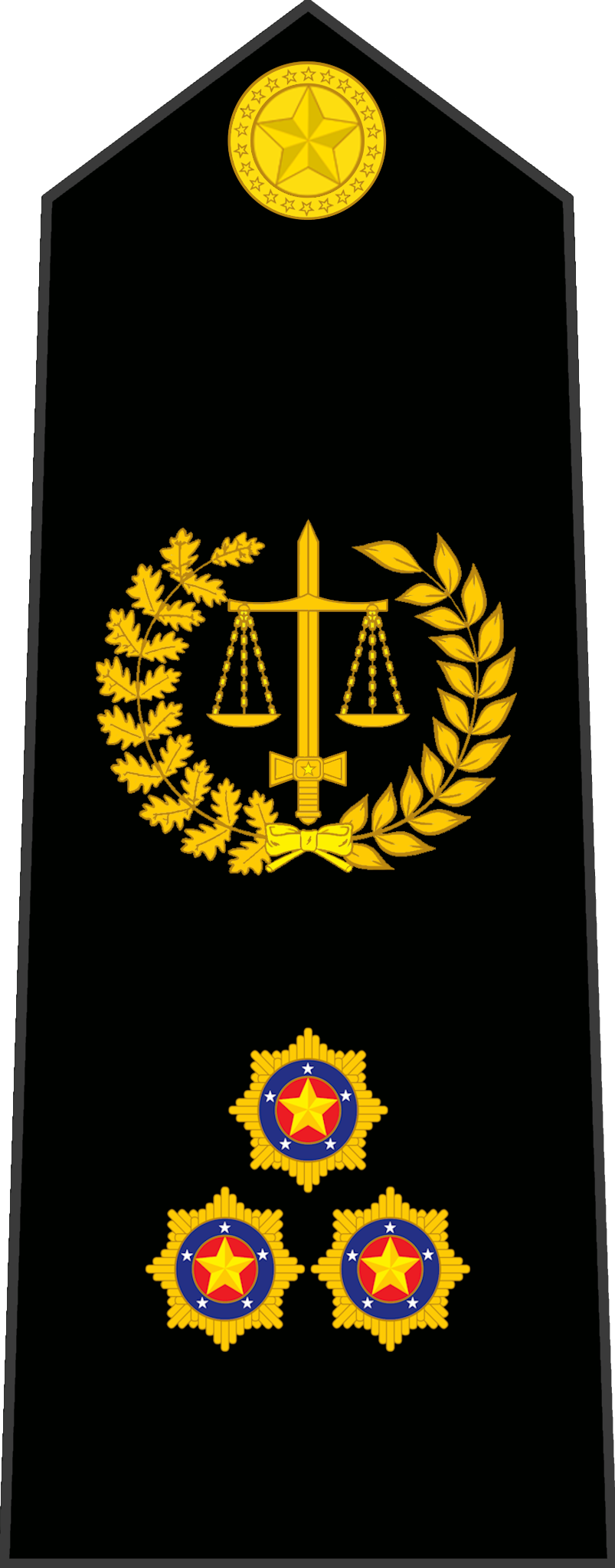
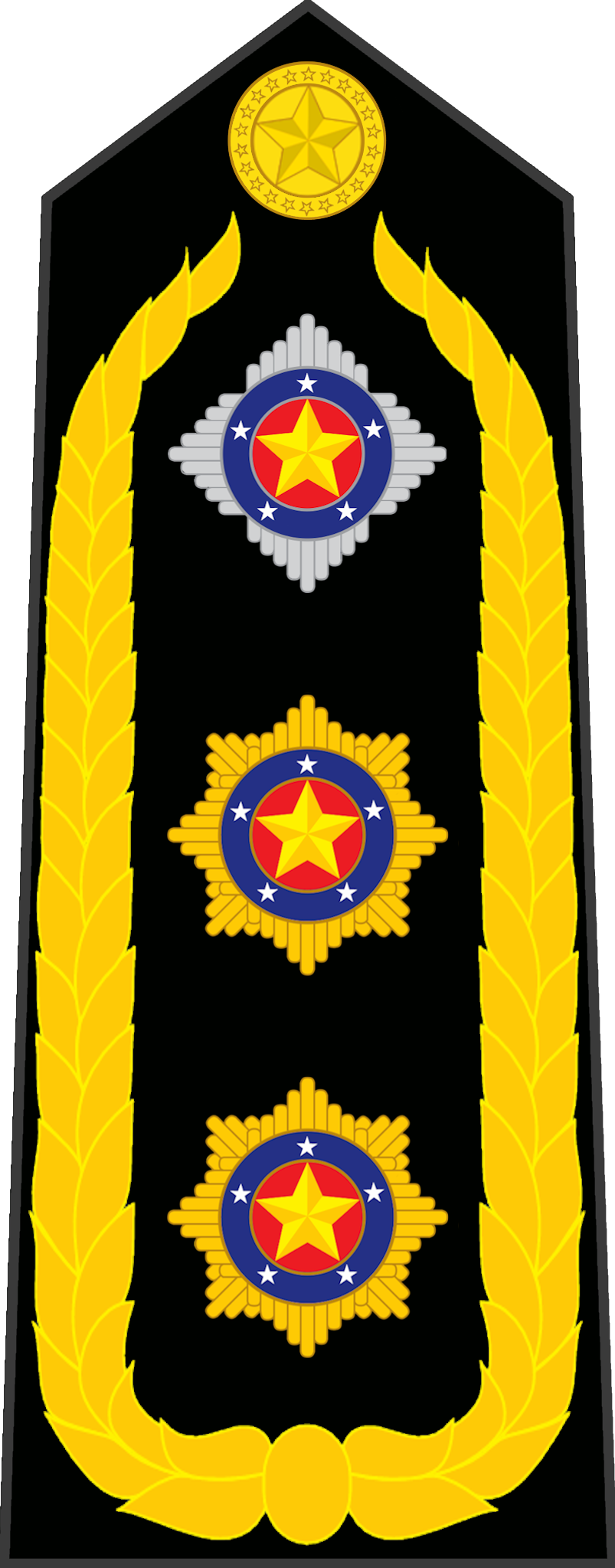
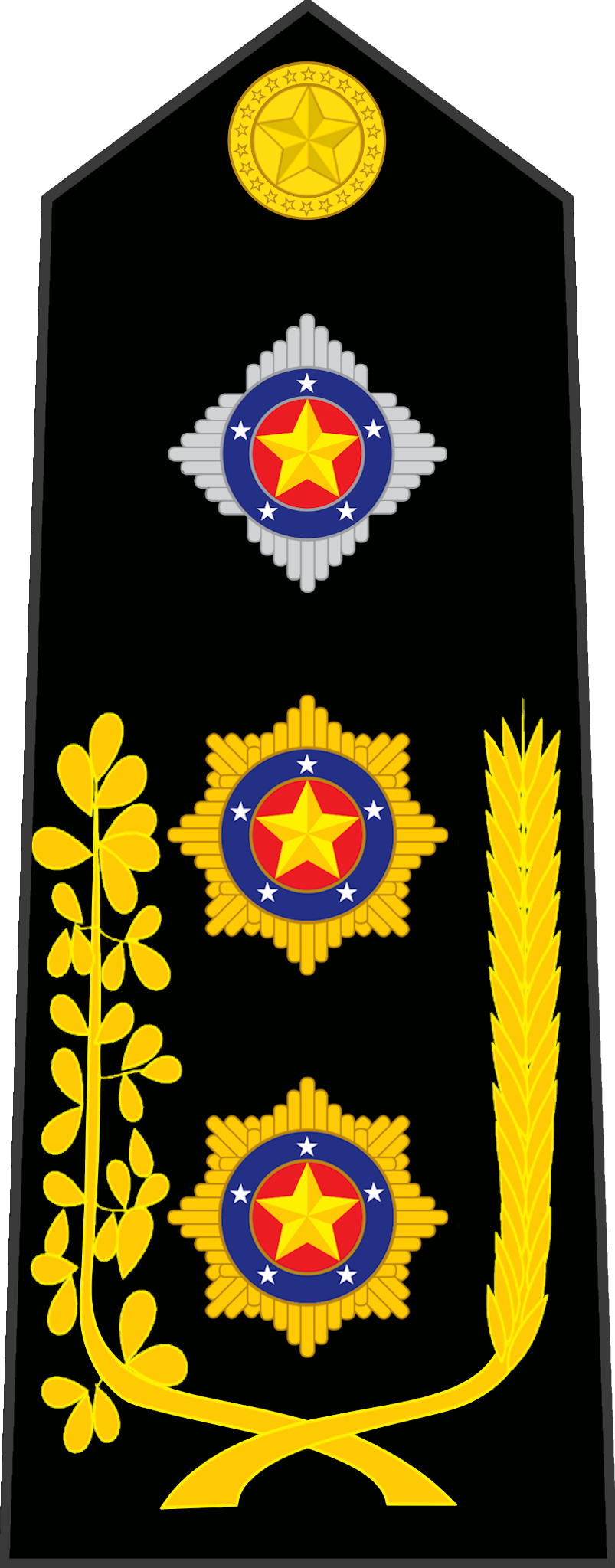
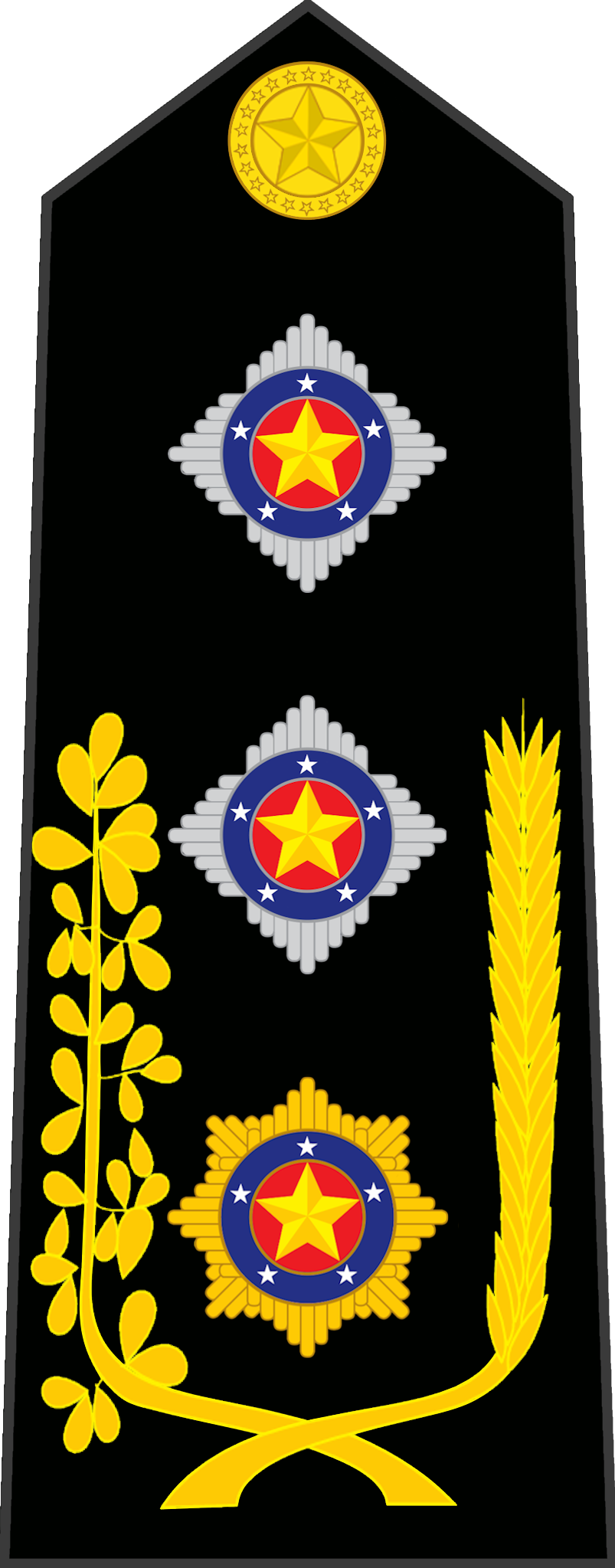
Rank	Colonel					Lieutenant colonel	Major
Brazilian Military Police
Brazilian Military Police	Colonel in the role of general commandar	Colonel in the role of governor's military cabinet chief (SP)	Colonel in the role of deputy general commander	Colonel in the role of chief of staff or regional commander (PR)	Colonel in the role of military court judge (SP, MG, RS)	Lieutenant-colonel in the role of Governor military / chief of staff or regional commander (interim)	Major in the role of Governor military cabinet chief or regional commander (interim)

Officers

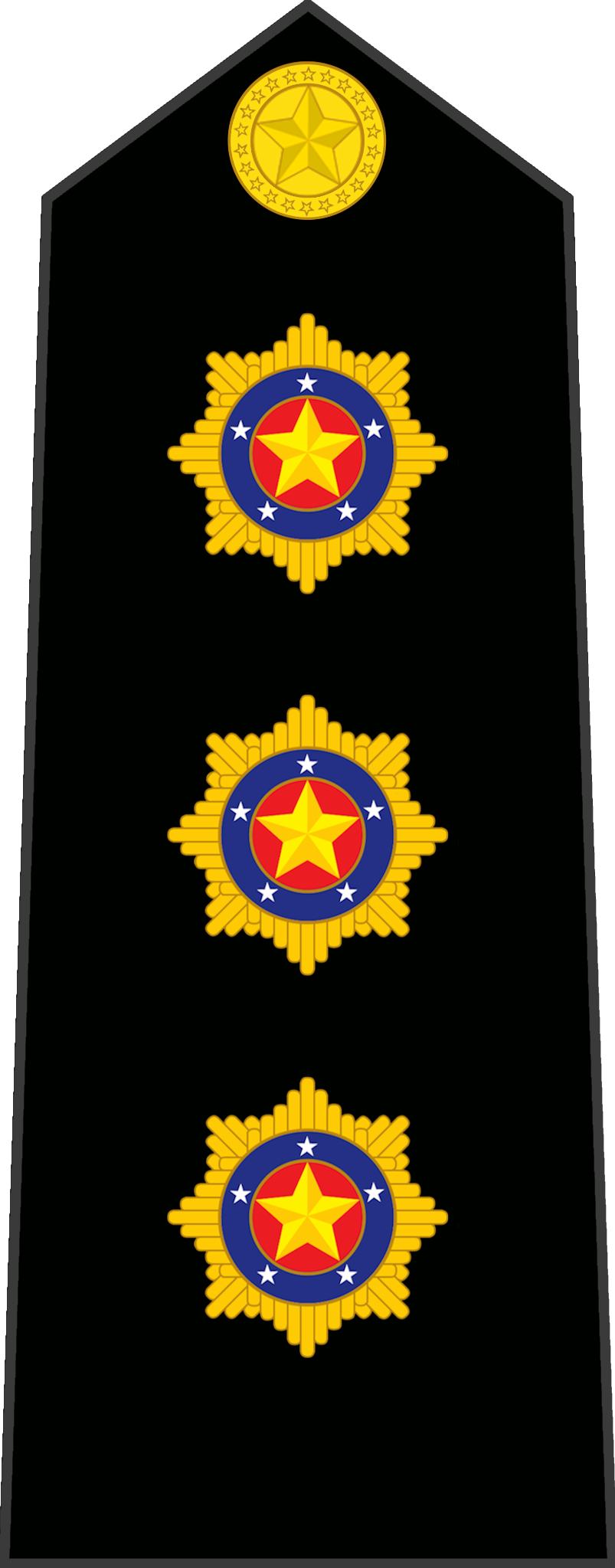
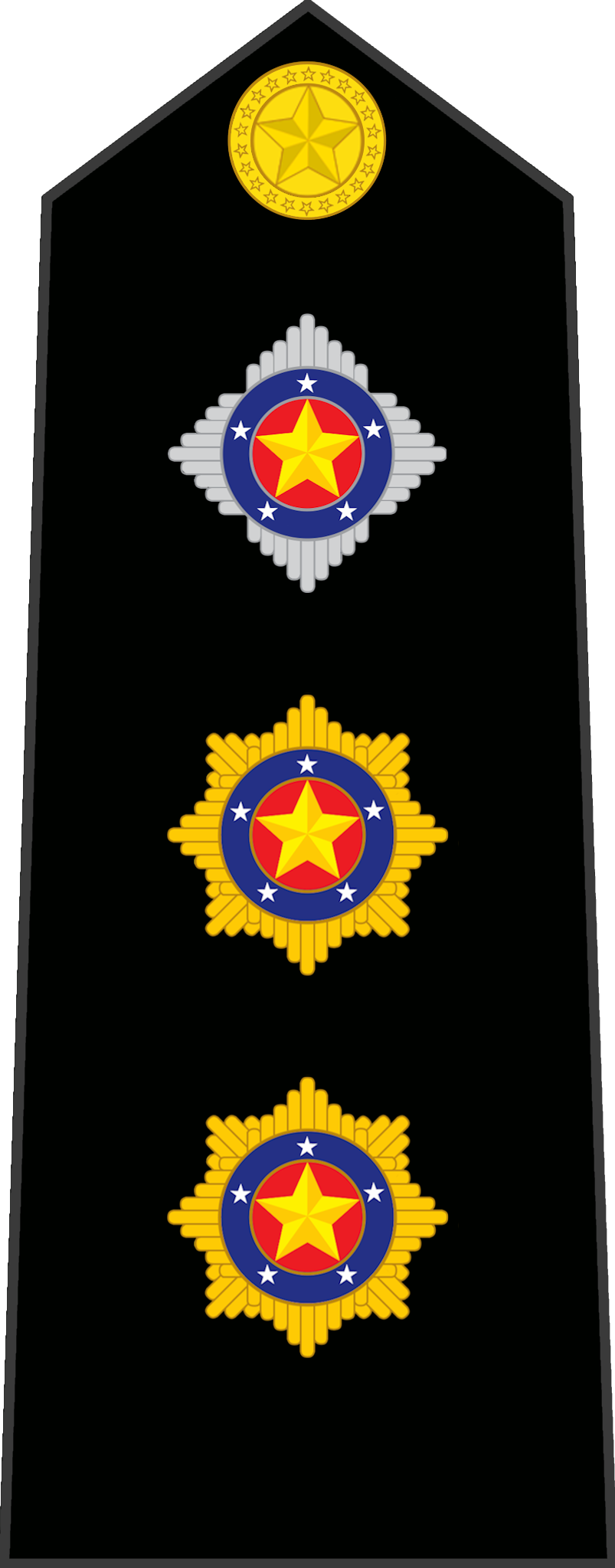
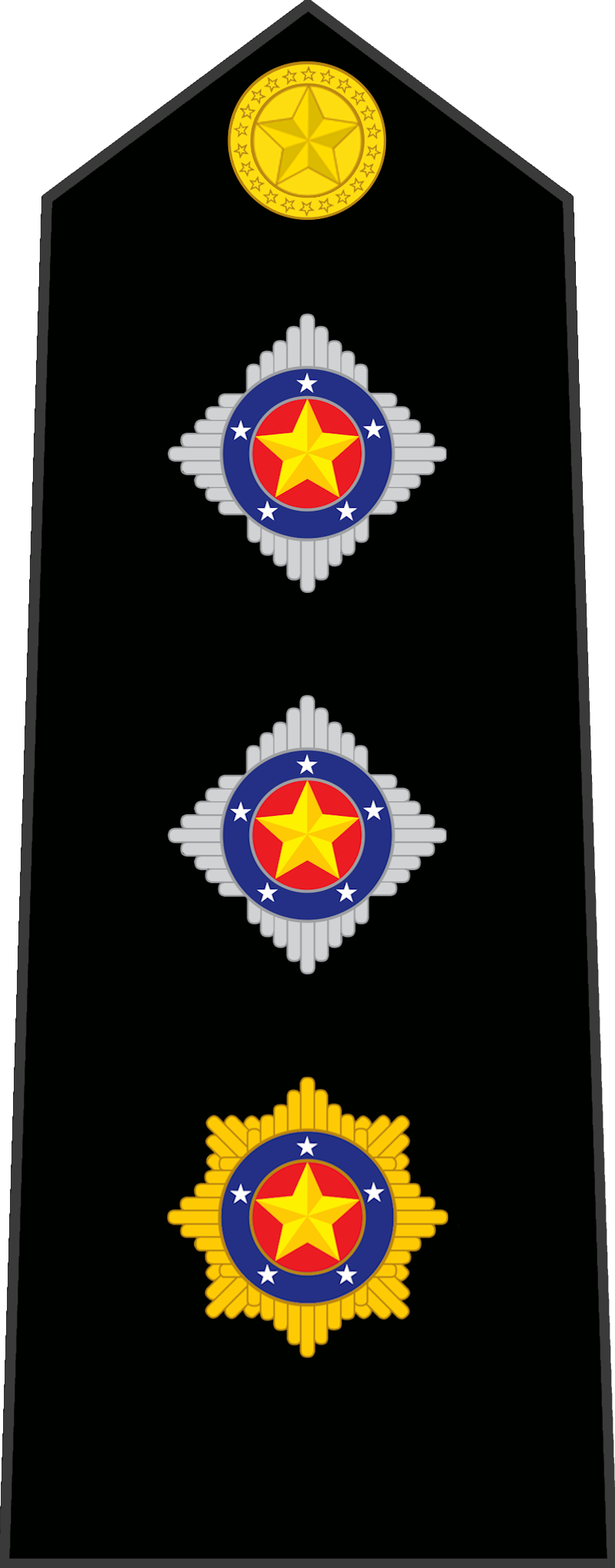
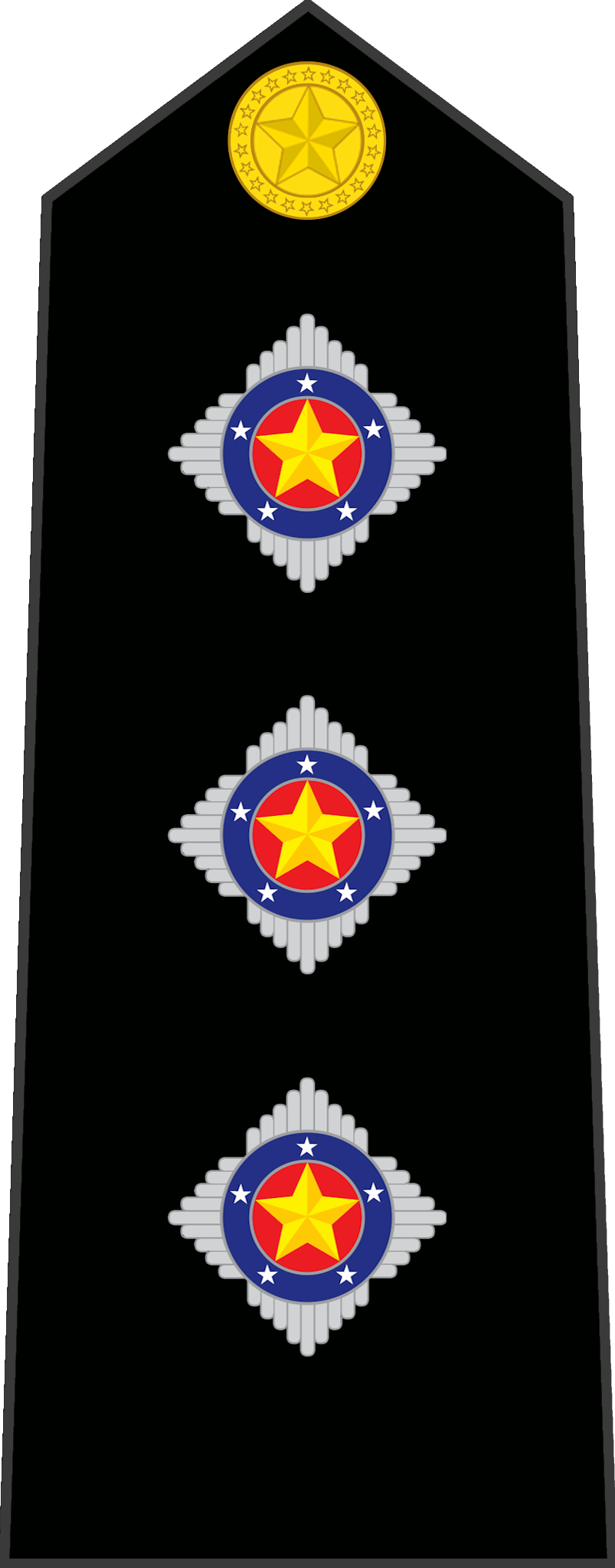
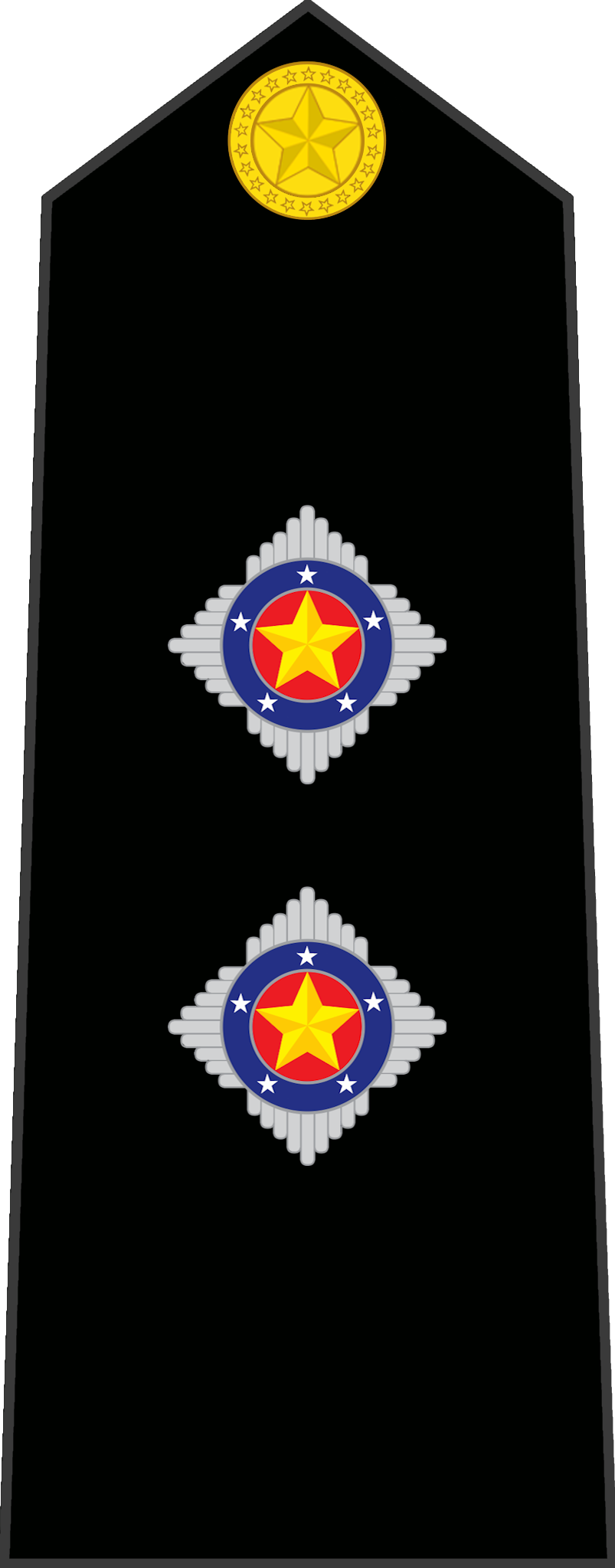
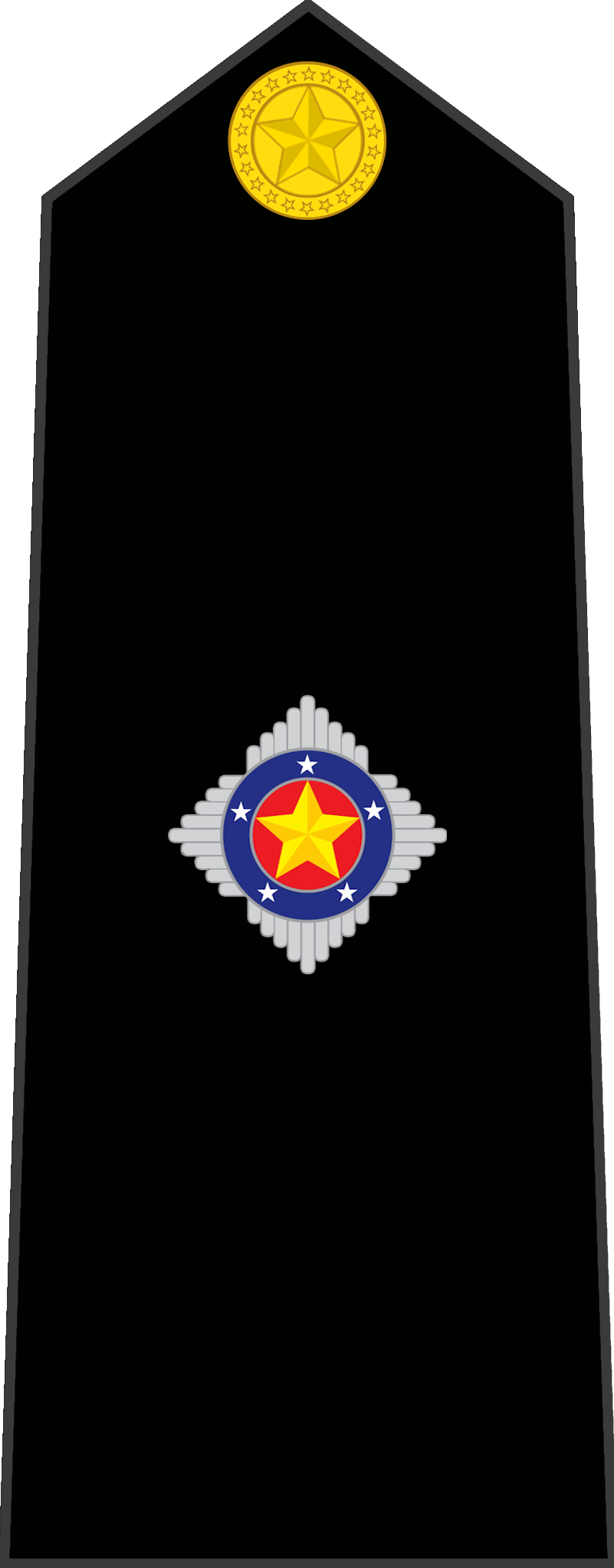
Rank group	Senior officers			Junior officers
Brazilian Military Police
Brazilian Military Police	Coronel	Tenente-coronel	Major	Capitão	Primeiro tenente	Segundo tenente

Student officers

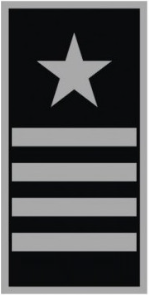
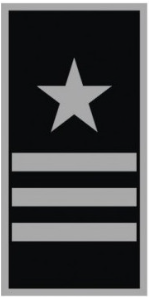
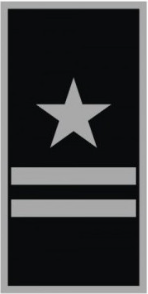
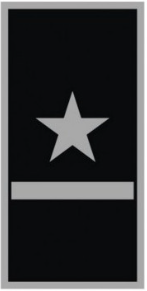
Rank group	Junior officer	Student officer/Cadets
Rank group	Junior officer	5th year	4th year	3rd year	2nd year	1st year
Brazilian Military Police
Brazilian Military Police	Aspirante a oficial		Aluno-oficial 4° ano (APMBB)	Aluno-oficial 3° ano (APMBB)	Aluno-oficial 2° ano (APMBB)	Aluno-oficial 1° ano (APMBB)

Enlisted

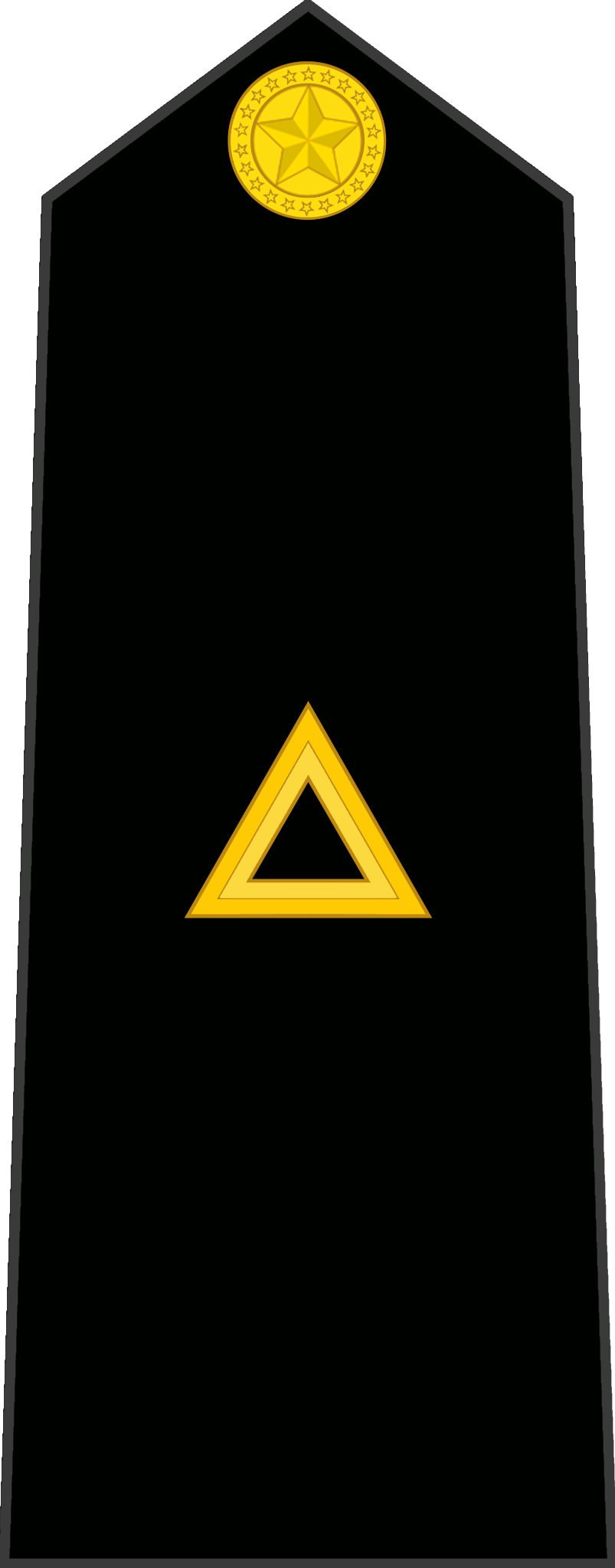
Rank group	Senior NCOs				Junior NCOs	Enlisted
Brazilian Military Police
Brazilian Military Police	Subtenente	Primeiro-sargento	Segundo-sargento	Terceiro-sargento	Cabo	Soldado primeira classe	Soldado segunda classe

Student NCOs

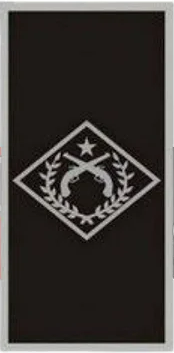
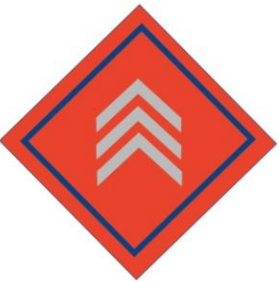
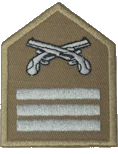
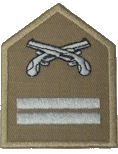
Rank group	Sargeants candidates			Corporal candidates	Soldier candidates
Brazilian Military Police
Brazilian Military Police	Aluno-Sargento (Essgt) (SP)	Aluno-Sargento (ES)	Aluno-Sargento (SC)	Aluno-Cabo (SC)

== Main types of policing ==
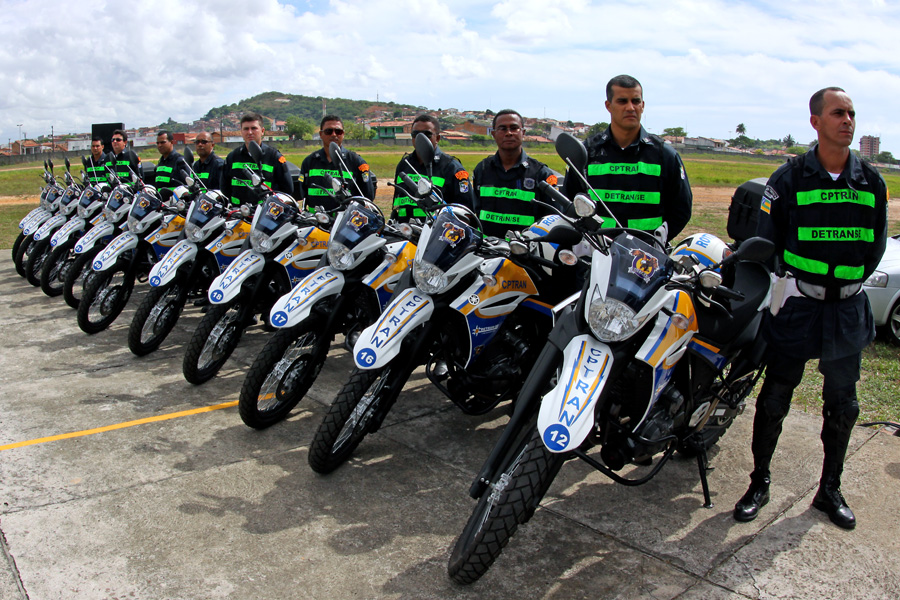
Police officers with motorcycles in the state of Sergipe.

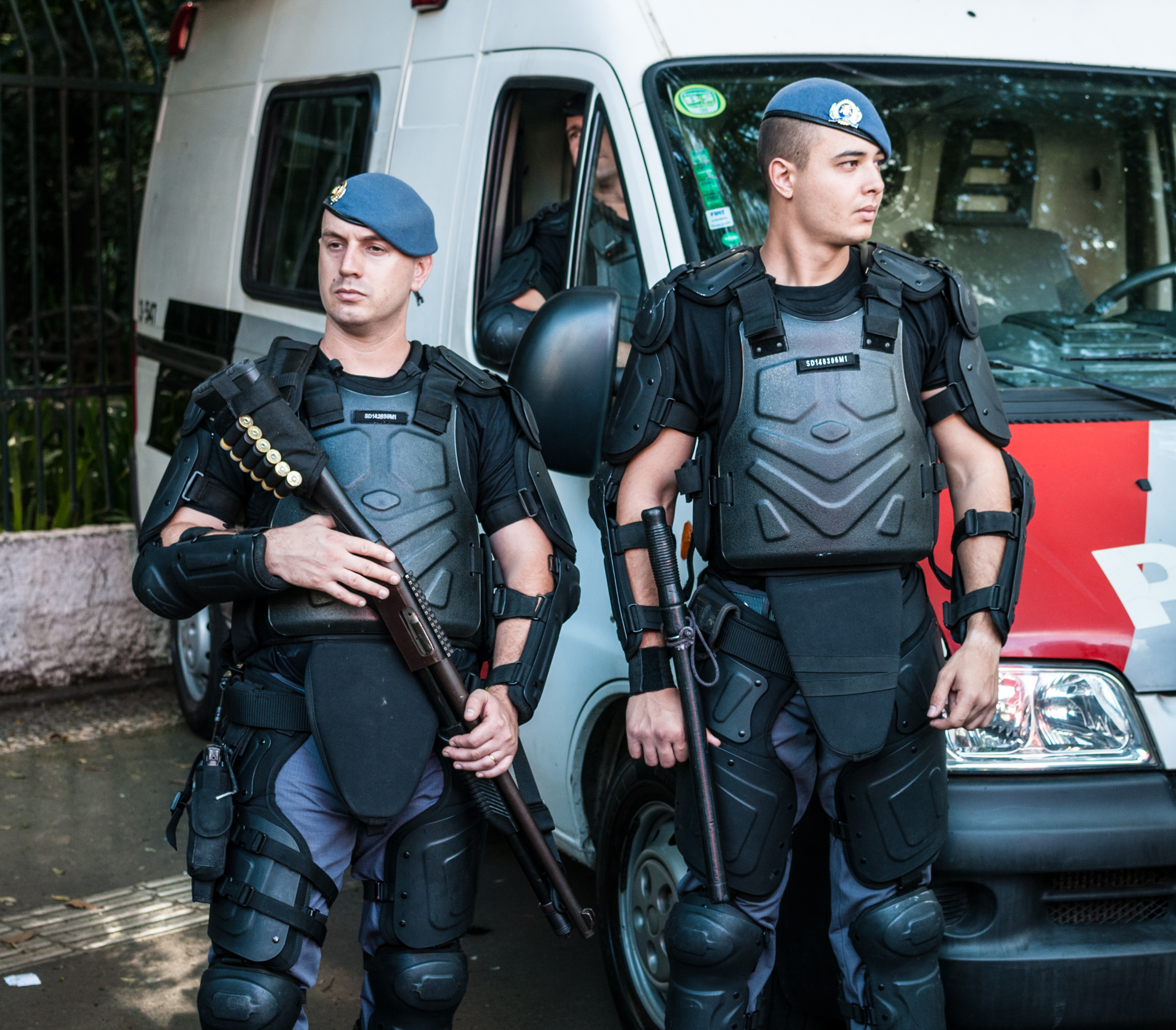
São Paulo police officers wearing riot gear.

- Aerial patrol
- Environmental police
- K-9
- Riot control police
- Prison security
- Urban traffic police
- School patrol
- Police bicycle
- Police motorcycle
- Mounted police
- Highway patrol
- Railroad police
- Special operations
- D.A.R.E.
- Tourist police

== Ratio of Military Police to Population ==
Analysis by the Federal Government of the ratio of resident population to the number of official Military Police in 2003 shows that the proportion is quite varied among the states. The states of Roraima, Amapá, Acre, Rondônia, Rio Grande do Norte and Rio de Janeiro, plus the Federal District have a higher proportion of Military Police. In the Federal District, for example, for each military police there are one hundred and thirty-seven inhabitants.

At the opposite extreme, the states with the lowest ratio of military police are Pará, Maranhão, Piauí, Ceará, Mato Grosso do Sul, Paraná and Rio Grande do Sul. Maranhão has the lowest, with 822 residents per officer.

Note that in the case of Rondônia the numbers of the Military Firefighters Corps are included in the figures for Military Police.

== National Public Security Force ==

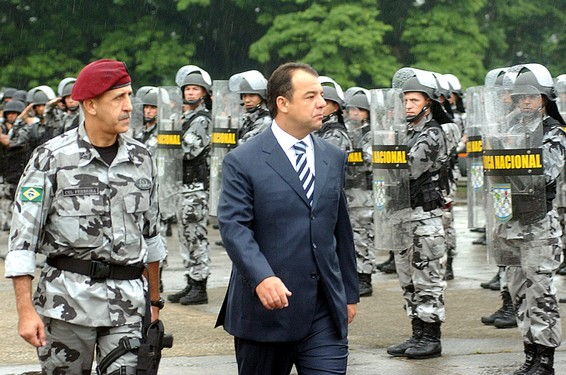
FNSP in Rio de Janeiro - 2007.

In situations of serious disturbance of public order or natural disasters that exceeds the capacity of the states police and firefighters, their governors can request assistance from the Federal Government.

To work in such situations, the Ministry of Justice has the National Public Security Force (Portuguese: Força Nacional de Segurança Pública; FNSP), a department composed of selected mobilized military firefighters, military and civilian police personnel from the states. The FNSP still works in coordination between the Secretary of Public Safety of each State and the Ministry of Justice, however, it is not a police force in the strict sense.

== Inspectorate General of Military Police ==
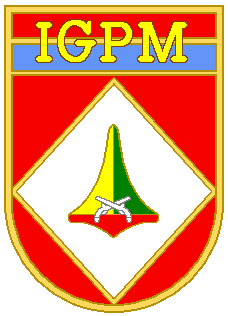

The Inspectorate General of Military Police (Portuguese: Inspetoria Geral das Polícias Militares) - IGPM is a command element of the Brazilian Army, responsible for coordinating and conducting activities of control over the Military Police and Military Firefighters Corps of States.
It is part of the Land Operations Command (Portuguese: Comando de Operações Terrestres) - COTER and its mission is:

- The establishment of principles, guidelines and standards for the effective implementation of control and coordination of the Military Police under Command of the Army, through its Military Area Commands, Regions and other Major Military Command;
- The control of the organization and legislation, personnel and equipment of military police, such as:

Weapons, ammunition, communications equipment, chemical agents, military equipment, vehicles, aircraft and boats.

- Collaboration in studies aiming to rights, justice and guarantees of the Military Police, and the establishment of conditions for convening and mobilization;
- Coordinating and monitoring compliance with the provisions of relevant State and Federal Legislation;
- Conduct regular inspections.

== Gallery ==
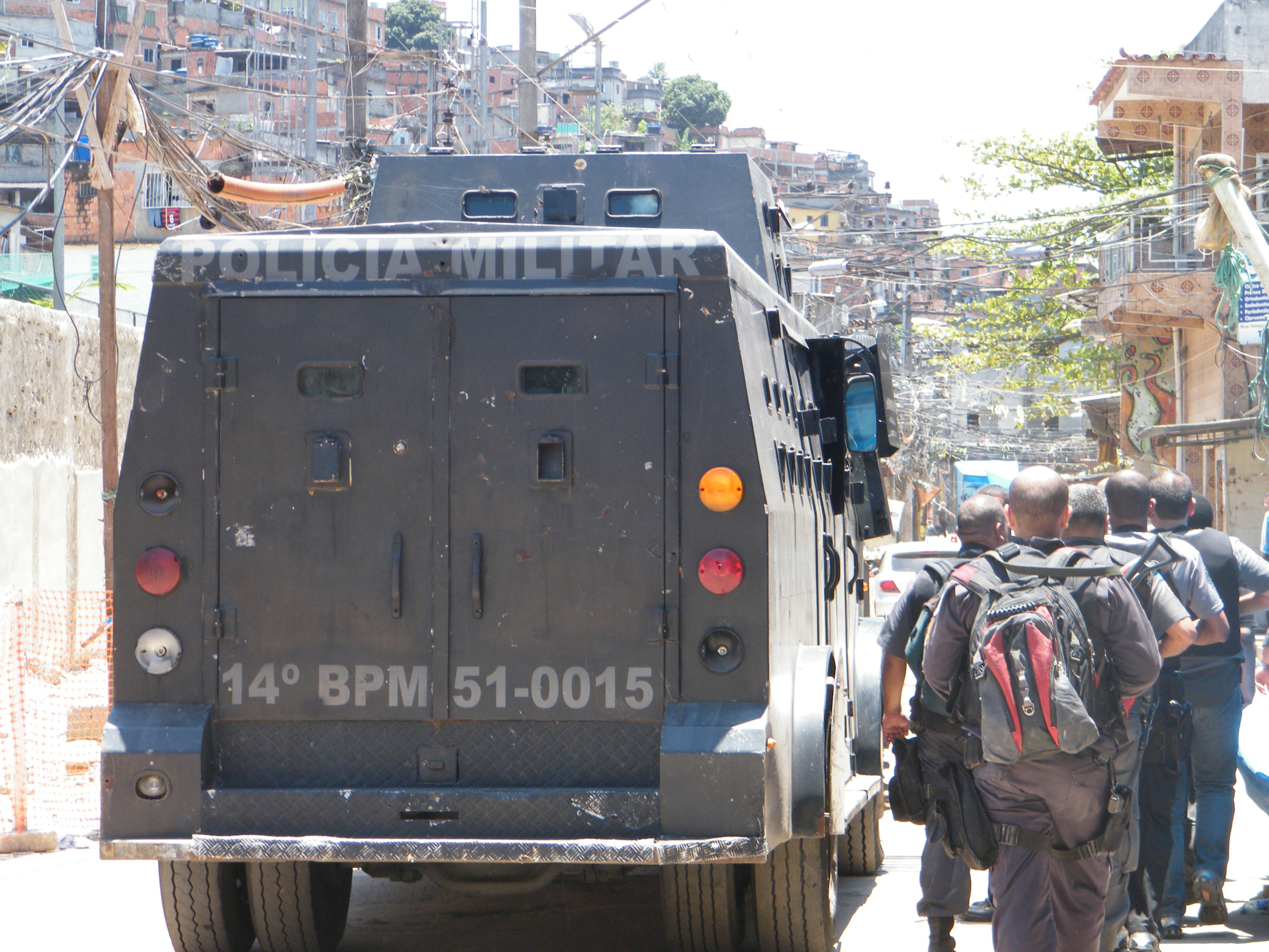
Armoured vehicle of Military Police of Rio de Janeiro State.

São Paulo State Military Police (PMESP) Mounted Police officers in São Paulo, Brazil.

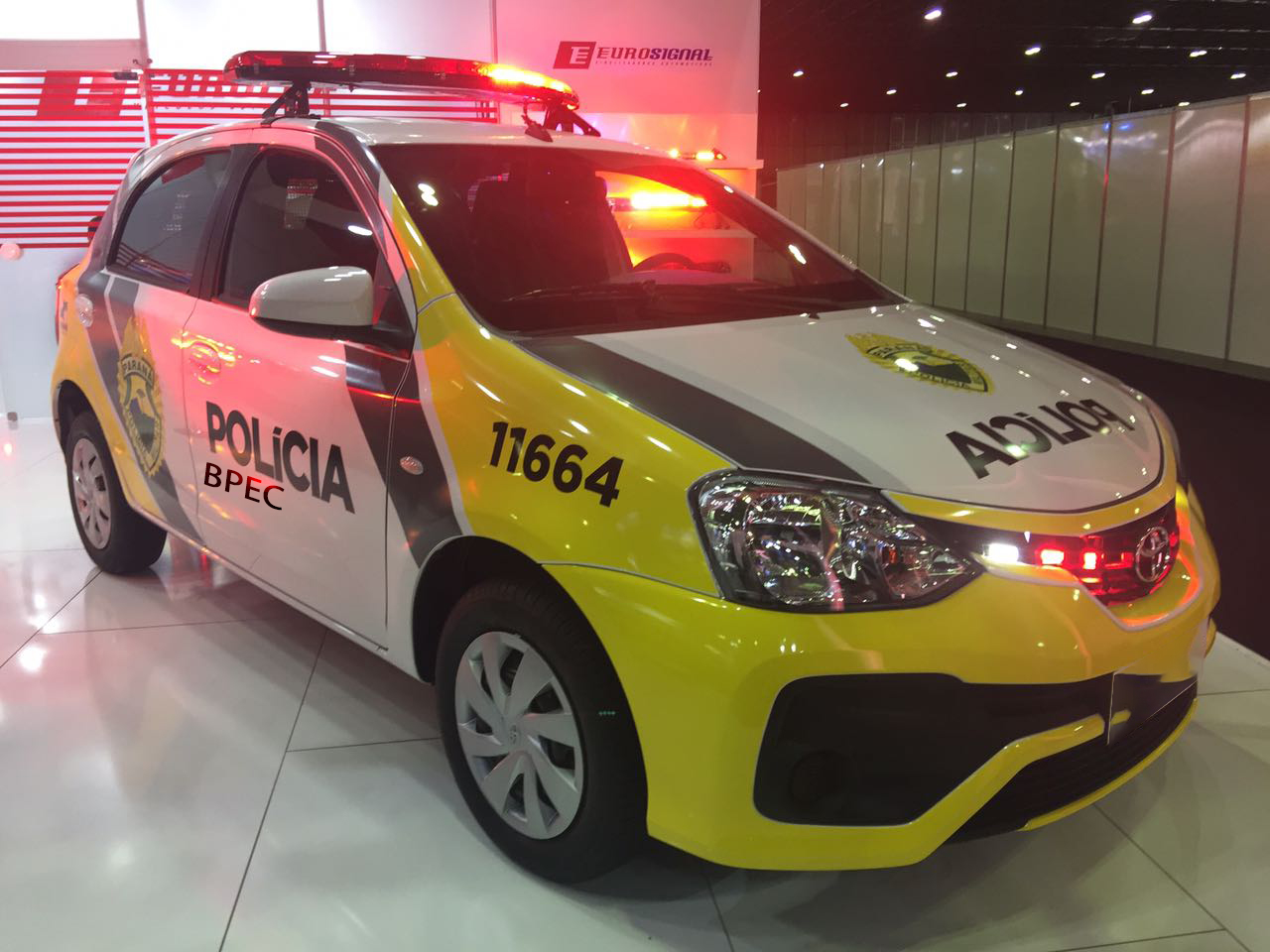
School Patrol vehicle of Military Police of Parana (BPEC).

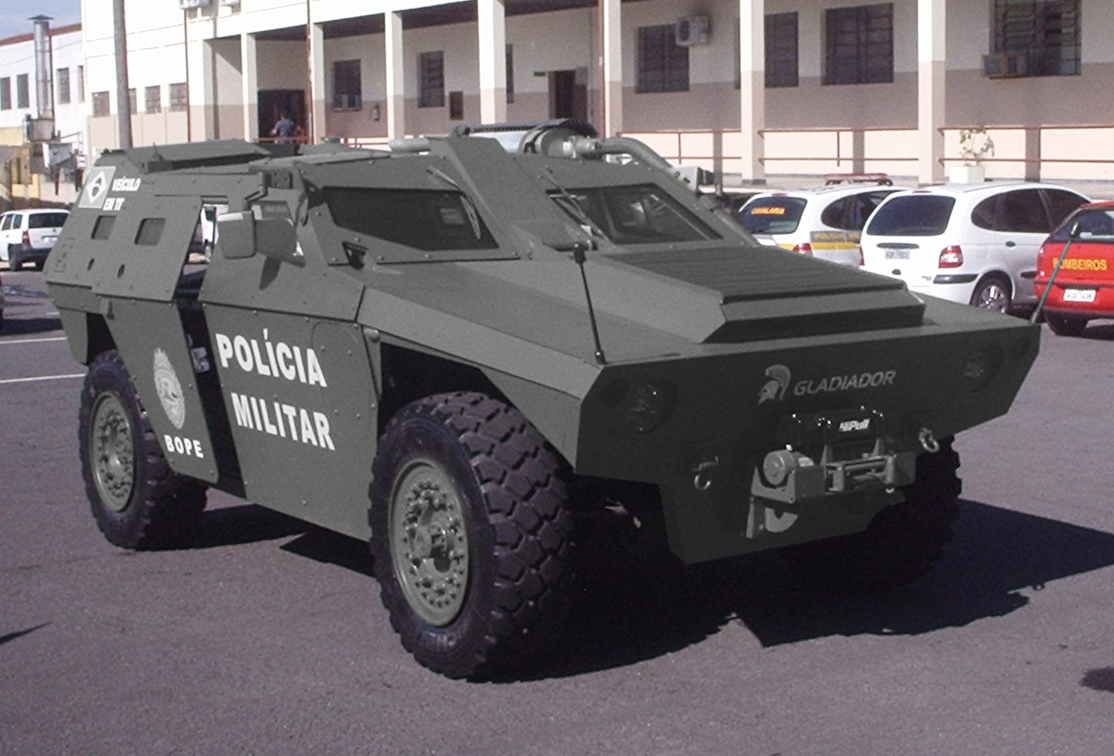
Armored Car Military Police of Parana.

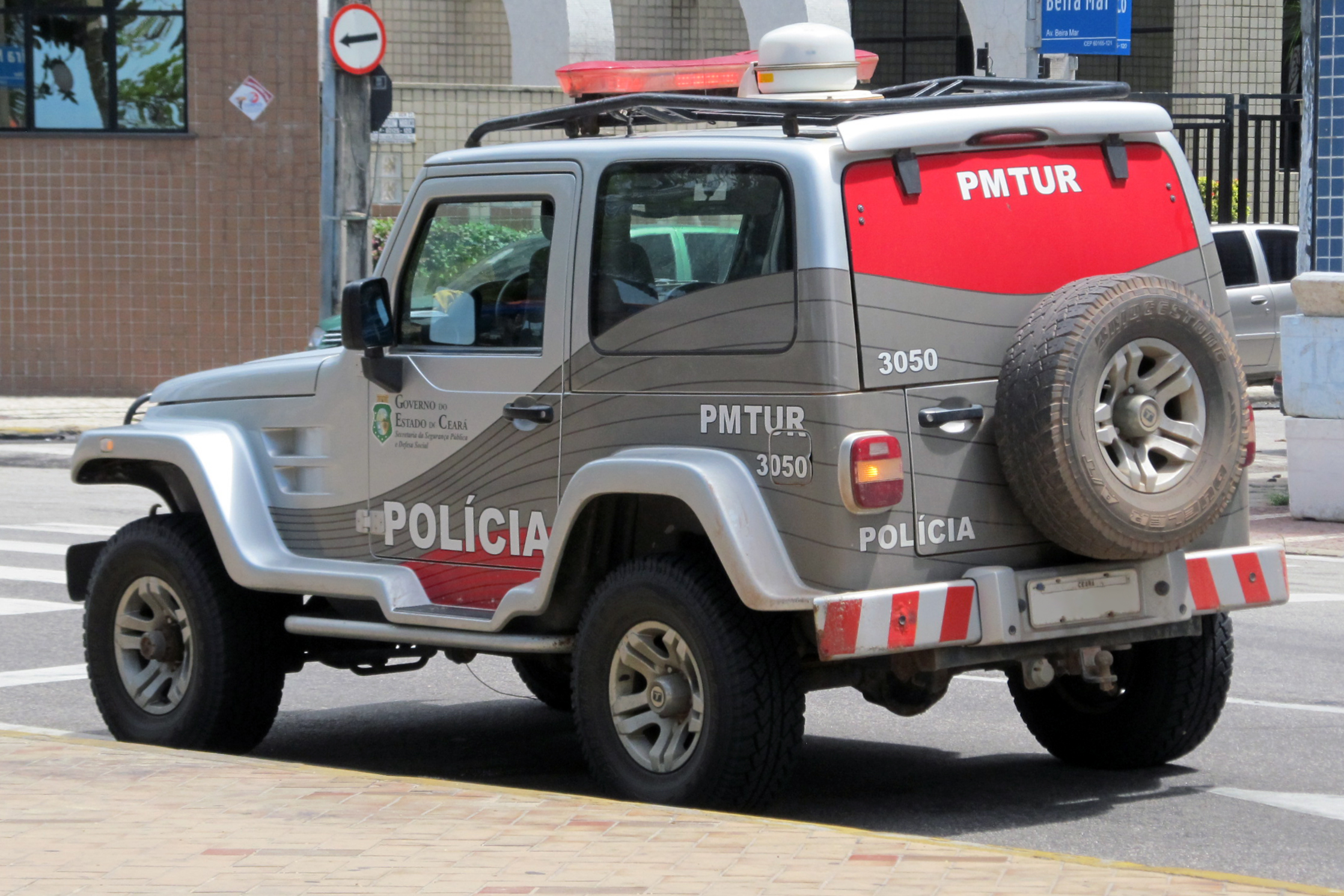
Troller T4 belonging to the "PMTUR" (Companhia Independente de Policiamento Turístico), seen in Fortaleza, Ceará State, Brazil.

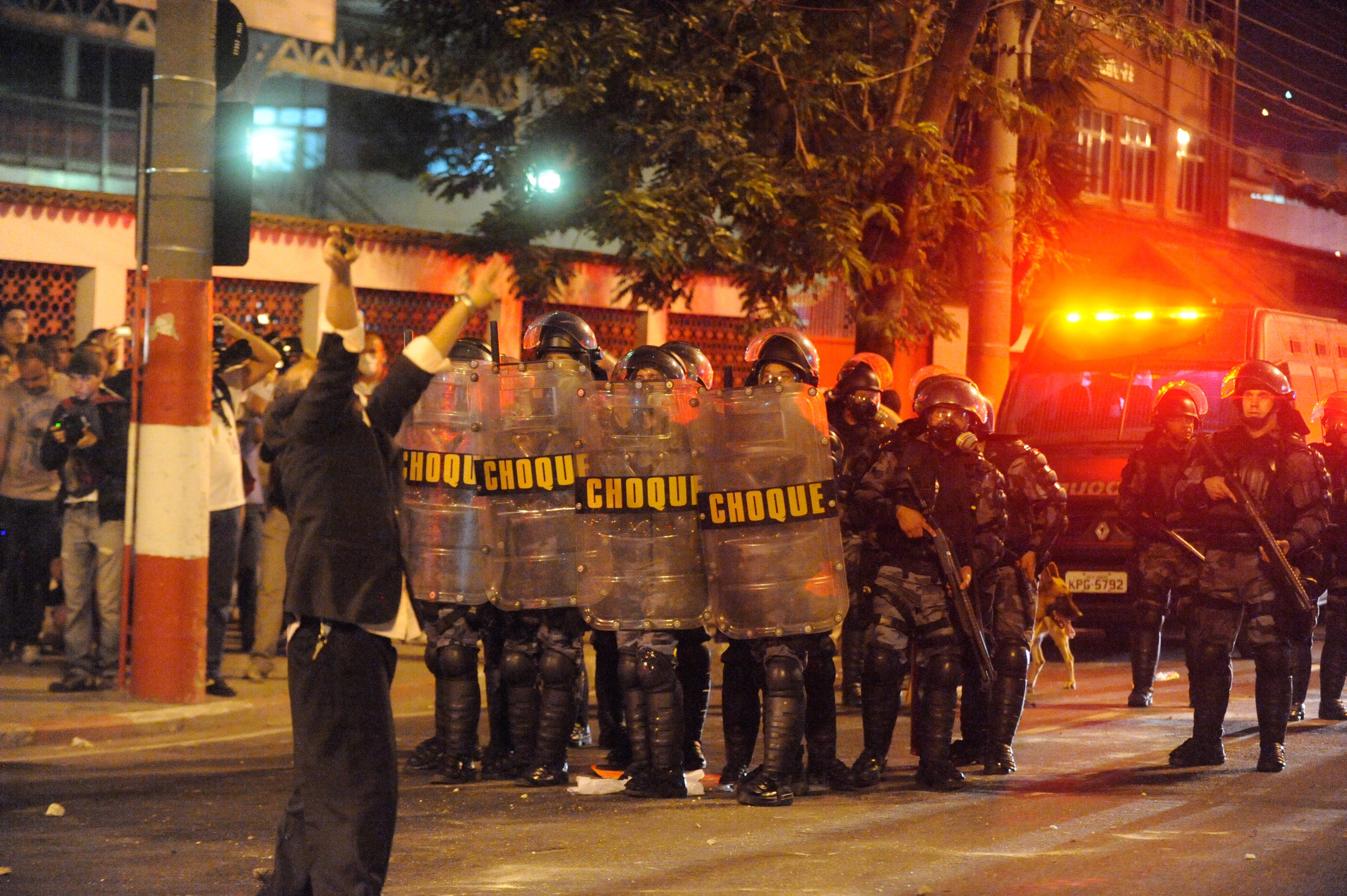
Riot control Police of Military Police of Rio de Janeiro State.

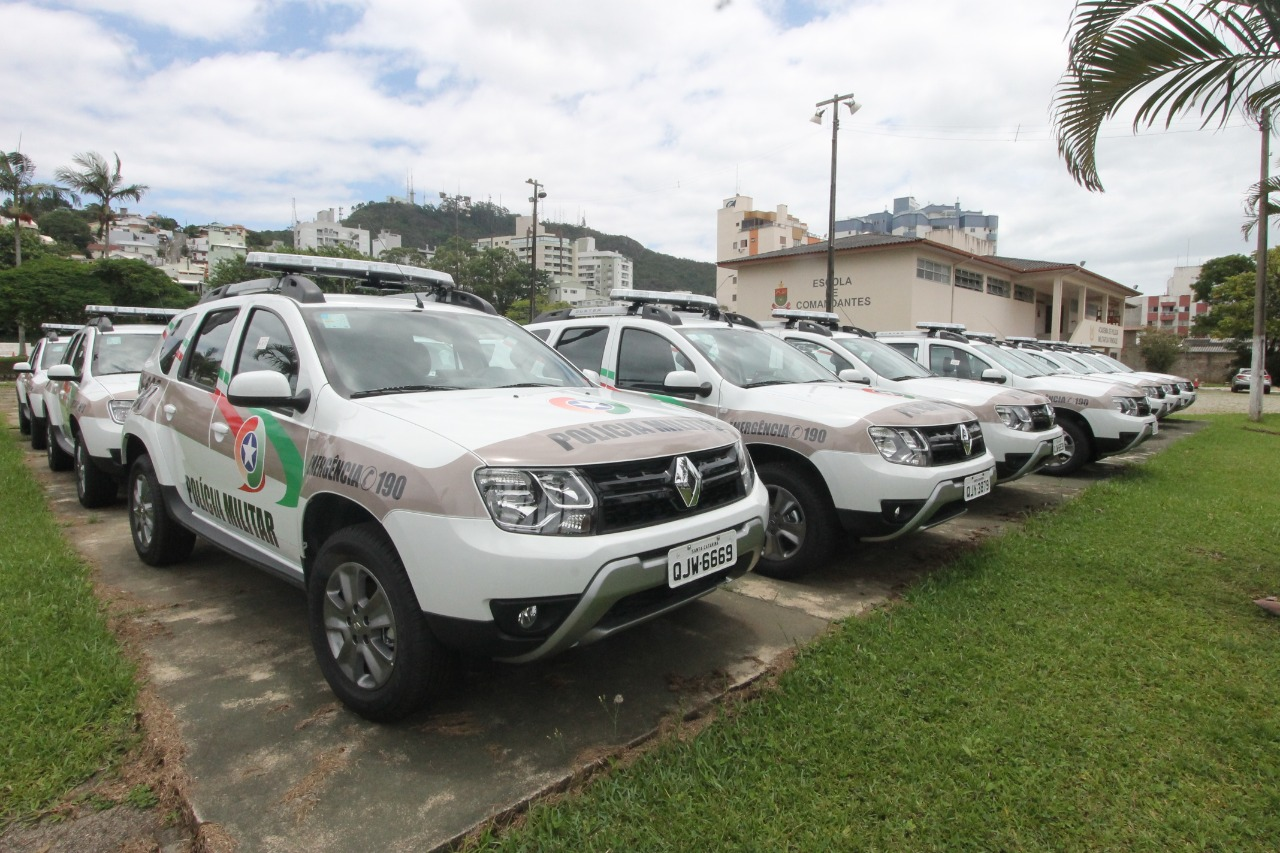
Response cars of the Military Police of Santa Catarina

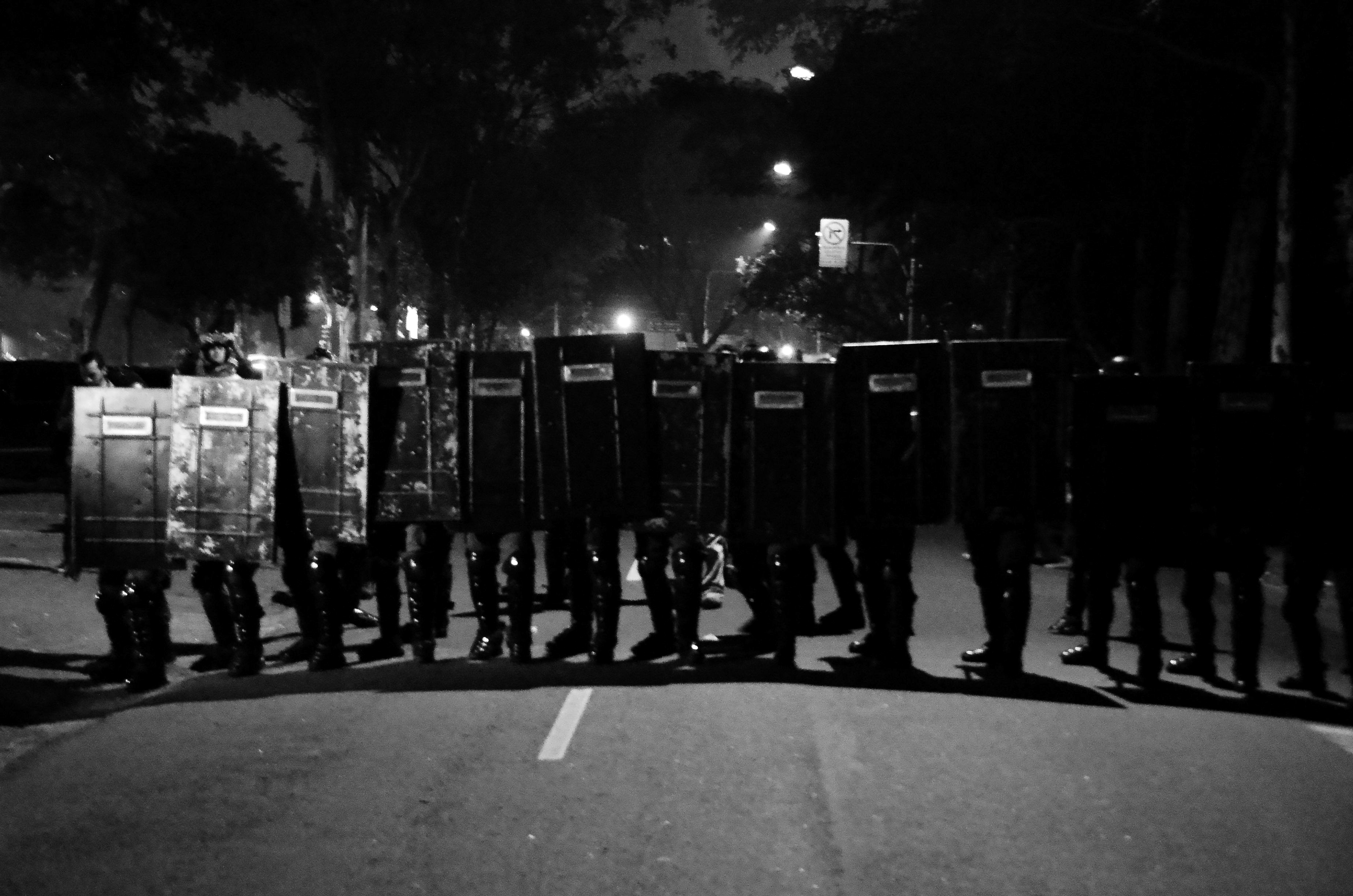
Riot control Police of São Paulo State.

== See also ==
- Brazilian Armed Forces
- Military Police (Provost)
- Military Firefighters Corps
- Gendarmerie
- United States National Guard
- State defense forces
- Brazilian Military Criminal Code

== Sources ==
- The Modern Endangered Archives Program Frevo Music collection is available through the UCLA Library.
- Em Nome da Ordem: a constituição de aparatos policiais no universo luso-brasileiro (séculos XVIII e XIX); Regina Helena Martins de Faria; Universidade Federal de Pernambuco (UFPE) - Recife; 2007. (texto em pdf.)
- A Polícia Militar de Mato Grosso - História e Evolução, 1835 a 1985; Ubaldo Monteiro.
- Crônica da Brigada Militar Gaúcha; Hélio Moro Mariante; edição da Imprensa Official; 1972.
- História da Polícia Militar de Pernambuco; Major Roberto Monteiro.
- História do Batalhão de Segurança - A Polícia Militar do Rio Grande do Norte, de 1834 a 1968; Romulo C. Wanderley; edição Walter Pereira S.A. / A Livraria e Papelaria; 1969.
- Episódios da História da PMPR - Volume I ao VII; Capitão João Alves da Rosa Filho; edição da Associação da Vila Militar; 2000.
- Origens Históricas da Polícia Militar de Minas Gerais - volumes 1 e 2; Coronel Paulo René de Andrade; edição da Imprensa Official de Minas Gerais; 1985.
- Raízes do Militarismo Paulista; Coronel Edilberto de Oliveira Melo; edição da Imprensa Official; 1982.
- Soldados da Pátria, História do Exército Brasileiro 1889 - 1937; Frank D. McCann; Edição da Companhia de Letras; 2007.
- Tropas Paulistas de Outrora; J. Wasth Rodrigues; edição do Governo do Estado de São Paulo; 1978.
