= Military Police of Espírito Santo State =

Military police of the Brazilian state of Espírito Santo

Military Police of Espírito Santo State Polícia Militar do Estado do Espírito Santo
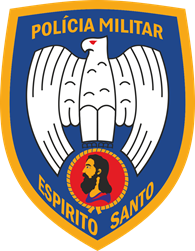
- Abbreviation: PMES

Agency overview
- Formed: April 6, 1835

Jurisdictional structure
- Operations jurisdiction: Espírito Santo, Brazil
- Map of police jurisdiction
- Area: 46,077.519 km^{2} (17,790.630 sq mi)
- Population: 3,464,285 (2006)
- Constituting instrument: Article 42 of Constitution of Brazil
- General nature: Gendarmerie

Operational structure
- Headquarters: Vitória

Website
- www.pm.es.gov.br

The Military Police of the State of Espírito Santo (Portuguese: Polícia Militar do Estado do Espírito Santo), also known as PMES, is a law enforcement organization that serves the Brazilian state of Espírito Santo.

== History ==
The PMES was established on April 6, 1835, by local state governor Manoel José Pires de Silva Pontes. After the military coup of 1889, which resulted in the transformation of Brazil from a monarchy into a republic, the PMES was restructured and renamed Security Corps. Throughout the years, the organization changed names many times: Police Corps (1898), Military Police Corps (1908), Military Police Regiment (1924), Police Force (1933), Military Police Force (1940), and finally Military Police.

The Military Police of Espírito Santo has intervened in many regional conflicts including the Paraguayan War (1865), the Revolution at São Paulo (1924), the Revolution of 1930, the Constitutional Movement at São Paulo (1932), and the state riots in the North and Caparao regions. Today the PMES is mainly responsible for maintaining the public order in the state of Espirito Santo. PMES troops perform search and rescue missions, carry out civil defense actions, and are involved in the prevention and fighting of fires and explosions, usually in conjunction with the Military Fireman Corps.

== Actions ==
The most violent regions in the state of Espírito Santo are located in the Serra and Cariacica municipalities of Greater Vitória. To prevent and combat crime there, the PMES regularly patrols those areas and actively seeks to attend to the necessities of the communities around the city. The PMES has developed safety education programs for the communities that it serves, conducting informational seminars and distributing booklets about public safety and drugs. These proactive actions have reportedly given the organization and its policemen a good image in the state.

== Technology ==
The PMES has an integrated emergency system called the "Centro Integrado de Operações e Defesa Social (CIODES)". This system allows citizens to simultaneously reach the MPES, Fire Corps and the Civilian Police during an emergency by just dialing a single telephone number. Recently, however, some citizens have complained about having to wait twenty minutes on the phone before CIODES answers their calls.

== Organization ==
The PMES is divided in:

=== Special Units ===
- Forest Police Company Companhia de Polícia Ambiental
- Mounted Police Regiment Regimento de Polícia Montada
- Special Missions Battalion - Batalhão de Missões Especiais
- Metropolitan Ostensive Policement Command - Comando de Policiamento Ostensivo Metropolitano
- Transit Battalion - Batalhão de Trânsito
- Southern Ostensive Policement Command - Comando de Policiamento Ostensivo Sul
- Northern Ostensive Policement Command - Comando de Policiamento Ostensivo Norte
- Shock Battalion - Batalhão de Choque
- Air Transport and Operation Nucleus - Núcleo de Operação e Transporte Aéreo

=== Administrative Commands ===
- Teaching and Instruction Dept - Diretoria de Ensino e Instrução
- Human Resources Dept. - Diretoria de Pessoal
- Computer Science Dept. - Diretoria de Informática
- Intelligence Dept. - Diretoria de Inteligência
- Social Promotion Dept. - Diretoria de Promoção Social
- Logistic Support Dept. - Diretoria de Apoio Logístico
- Financial Dept. - Diretoria de Finanças
- Corregedoria - An internal organization which investigates Police Excesses.

== See also ==
- Espírito Santo
- Military Police of Brazil
- Brazilian Federal Police
- Federal Highway Police
- Brazilian Civil Police
- Brazilian Armed Forces
- Military Police
- Gendarmerie
- 2017 Military Police of Espírito Santo strike
