= AU10TIX =

Israeli Identity verification company

- Type: Privately held company
- Industry: Identity verification
- Founded: 2002; 24 years ago
- Founder: Ron Atzmon
- Headquarters: Tel Aviv, Israel
- Area served: Worldwide
- Key people: Yair Tal (CEO)
- Services: multi-channel ID document authentication, ID fraud detection
- Number of employees: 200
- Parent: ICTS International
- Website: www.au10tix.com

AU10TIX is an Israeli identity verification and risk management company that is headquartered in Tel Aviv, Israel with operations in New York, NY, London, Singapore and Amsterdam. The company's products enable businesses to securely onboard and verify customers. AU10TIX has an automated identity management system, as well as products to detect organized ID fraud mass attacks.

== History ==
AU10TIX was founded in 2002 by Ron Atzmon and Gil Atzmon as a provider of identity verification technologies. The company's early work focused on document authentication for border control and aviation security.

In 2019, AU10TIX sold a portion of the business to TPG and Oak HC/FT for $80M, with proceeds to be invested back into growth and R&D. The company is otherwise self-funded. In 2020, AU10TIX and Folio announced that they had received certification under international data security and privacy standards.

In 2024, Au10tix partnered with Twitter to require verification data for X Blue users. Au10tix is also used by websites such as Airbnb, Bird, Paypal, LinkedIn and Fiverr.

In 2025, AU10TIX was selected by Microsoft as a premier identity verification (IDV) issuer for its Entra Verified ID platform, enabling organisations to issue and verify decentralised digital identity credentials. The collaboration made AU10TIX’s identity verification technology available through the Microsoft Security Store. The workflow they developed for this requires Microsoft customers to submit their biometric data to AU10TIX The data is then retained in Israel and used for training Au10TIX's AI models which are widely used by the Israeli military and intelligence services.

=== Data Breach ===
In 2022, administrative credentials associated with AU10TIX were reported to have been exposed online, potentially allowing access to personal data, related to specific people who had uploaded their identity documents, which included the person’s name, date of birth, nationality, identification number, and the type of document uploaded.

The company only became aware of the breach in 2024 and in 2025 released a statement claiming that an internal review found no evidence of data exposure or customer impact.

== Products ==
AU10TIX's technology uses artificial intelligence and machine learning in computer vision. Its products include:

Identity Verification Suite: A suite of ID verification services launched in the 2010s. It includes document structure, data integrity, and digital forensic checks. The suite is anti–money laundering (AML) compliant and meets politically exposed persons (PEP) and sanction screening requirements.

Serial Fraud Monitor: This solution uses advanced neural networks to monitor evolving fraud patterns and behavior in customer traffic. It is the industry's first solution that can detect coordinated mass ID fraud attacks. Serial Fraud Monitor is designed to safeguard businesses against advanced organized fraud, which is undetectable through traditional security case-level solutions.

Reusable Digital ID: Designed to simplify ID verification, this is a collaboration with Microsoft.

AU10TIX platform: This hub unifies the company's backend technology and frontend interfaces.
