= ICTS International =

Dutch firm

- Company type: Public
- Traded as: OTCQB: ICTSF
- Founded: 1982; 44 years ago
- Headquarters: Netherlands
- Area served: Worldwide
- Key people: Menachem J. Atzmon (Chairman); Alon Raich (CEO and Co-Managing Director); Gil Atzmon (Co-Managing Director); Ron Atzmon (AU10TIX Managing Director)
- Owner: MacPherson Atzmon Family Trust; Menachem J. Atzmon; (78.6% of issued and outstanding common stock (excluding conversion rights))
- Website: ictsintl.com

ICTS International N.V. is a Dutch firm that develops products and provides consulting and personnel services in the field of aviation and general security. Founded in 1982, by former Israeli security agents, the company has grown into a multinational provider of integrated security solutions for the aviation industry and beyond. Its shares are traded on OTCQB under the symbol ICTSF.

The firm and its subsidiaries specialize in security technologies and services including aviation security and other airport services, and ID authentication technology for government and commercial institutions. In 2014, the company employed 4,784 people with an annual sales revenue of US$173 million.

== History ==
ICTS International was established in 1982 by a group of Israeli professionals from the security agency Shin Bet and El Al Israel Airlines. The founders applied methods developed in Israel’s aviation security sector to create a commercial security enterprise. Over the following decades, the company expanded its operations across Europe, the United States, and Asia.

== Subsidiaries ==
The main subsidiaries of ICTS International are the I-SEC International Security Group, Huntleigh USA, and AU10TIX.

I-SEC specializes in the provision of advanced aviation security services worldwide, which include security consulting and security handling: security profiling, checkpoint screening, hold baggage screening ("HBS"), X-ray operator training and integrated services. I-SEC's management and key personnel are developers of pioneering aviation concepts, methods and technologies, focusing primarily on high-risk environments. I-SEC has operations in the Netherlands, Germany, Spain, Italy, Portugal, Japan and Russia. I-SEC was established in 2005 as the aviation security arm of the ICTS International. PI (Procheck International) is a subsidiary of I-SEC.

Huntleigh USA, the airline security and passenger screening company that was responsible for the passengers that boarded the flights at Boston and Newark before the 9/11 attacks, provides airport ground services in the US. Such services include charter flights, cargo security screening, aircraft search, guard services, airline agents, queue monitors, aircraft cleaning, ramp and below-the-wing services, skycap, wheelchair attendants, baggage handling, etc. Huntleigh USA is a wholly owned subsidiary of ICTS.

AU10TIX offers a front-end solution meeting the security and regulatory compliance requirements of the financial services sector, including Section 326 of the USA Patriot Act. AU10TIX's front-end solution incorporates unique features, such as a dynamic questionnaire, developed in collaboration with ICTS's expertise in identity verification and advanced document authentication.

== Products and services ==
ICTS has developed a multi-layered passenger assessment methodology employed in Israel, whereby passengers are evaluated based on a combination of indicators, including travel patterns, documentation and behavioral analysis. In the late 1990s, the firm also developed a product system based on a computerized algorithm called APS (Advanced Passenger Screening) which analyzes passenger information procured by airline companies and determines the potential risks posed by a given passenger. APS is used by most of the large airlines in the United States.

Another ICTS International product is Integrated Passenger Processing Solutions or IP@SS, a system that accelerates passenger flow while enhancing security. Automated TravelDoc is a system which performs automatic scans of travel documents to verify their authenticity and ensure they meet the requirements of the destination country. Another product is APIS Solution, a scanner that extracts data required by U.S. Customs automatically. ICTS International also produces a computer-based training system for X-ray operators that simulates potential workday situations.

== Executive Officers ==
Executive Officers of ICTS International include Menachem J. Atzmon (Chairman of the Supervisory Board since 2004), Ran Langer (Managing Director since 2004), and Alon Raich (CFO since 2008). Atzmon holds controlling shares, owning more than 60% of ICTS International through a family trust.

== Bibliography ==
- Dolev, Gilai; d&a hi-tech information Ltd. (2004). Israel Hi-Tech directory 2004. d&a hi-tech information Ltd. ISBN 965-90293-4-9.

== See also ==
- Northern Virginia airport workers' strikes
