= Spectrum strike =

Workers' strike

Spectrum Strike
- Date: March 28, 2017 – April 18, 2022
- Location: New York City, New York, United States of America
- Goals: Maintenance of union healthcare plans and pensions

Parties
International Brotherhood of Electrical Workers (IBEW) Local 3	Spectrum

The Spectrum Strike was a workers' strike involving 1,200 Spectrum workers in New York City. The strike began on March 23, 2017, when 1,800 Spectrum workers walked off the job in protest of a plan by the company to replace its union healthcare plan and union pension with a company-run healthcare plan and pension plan. Most of the workers, represented by the International Brotherhood of Electrical Workers (IBEW) Local 3 continued to strike for more than five years, as Spectrum refused to negotiate with the union, has hired a large temporary scab workforce, and fought to decertify the union, making the strike one of the longest in the history of the United States. Many of the striking workers, economically hurt by long work stoppage, have taken to creating a workers cooperative internet service provider called People's Choice.

== Background ==
In 2016, Charter Communications purchased Time Warner Cable, and rebranded the firm's operations as Spectrum. As of 2020, Spectrum is the largest provider of cable television, internet, and telephone service in the state of New York, as well as the second-largest cable provider in the country. Spectrum served 31 million customers in 41 states as of October 2021. Following the acquisition, one member of the firm's union, the International Brotherhood of Electrical Workers (IBEW) Local 3, claimed that the firm became fixated on "increasing stock prices, as opposed to customer service", and multiple Spectrum workers have reported that the firm implemented harsher disciplinary rules and ignored union-negotiated procedures.

As part of Charter's acquisition, Charter Communications hoped to take control of Spectrum workers' health insurance plans and pension plans, which had previously been run by the workers' union, IBEW Local 3, and overseen by an independent board of trustees. However, IBEW objected, calling Spectrum's plan "substandard", and said that they would prefer to hold on to their existing plan. Officials with IBEW also raised concerns that by transferring control of workers' healthcare plans and pension plans over to Spectrum, the union and the workers it represents would lose leverage in future negotiations with Spectrum.

== Course of the strike ==
On May 23, 2017, negotiations between the International Brotherhood of Electrical Workers (IBEW) Local 3 and Spectrum broke down, and 1,800 workers affiliated with the union walked off the job. However, instead of negotiating with the union, which is common in many strikes, Spectrum refused to enter into talks with IBEW Local 3. In lieu of typical negotiations, Spectrum hired a large temporary workforce of strikebreakers, and attempted to launch a vote to decertify the union in 2019. Without any direct negotiations, the strike has lasted an unusually long period of time, and became the longest strike in United States history. The length of the strike has had a profound economic impact on many of the striking workers, many of whom have had to turn to alternative forms of income. Some workers have returned to their jobs with Spectrum due to said economic hardship.

In 2019, IBEW Local 3 filed a complaint with the National Labor Relations Board (NLRB) against Spectrum, claiming unfair labor practices, and objecting to Spectrum's effort to de-certify the union. In March 2020, the NLRB granted IBEW Local 3 the right to review Spectrum's effort to de-certify the union, finding that the union raised "a serious and substantial issue" about Spectrum's efforts.

=== COVID-19 pandemic ===
A number of striking workers were also been negatively impacted by the COVID-19 pandemic, which deprived many of alternative forms of income, and exacerbated their healthcare needs. As of April 2021, Gizmodo reported that 1,200 of the original 1,800 striking workers remained on strike.

=== Formation of People's Choice ===
Organizers with the International Brotherhood of Electrical Workers (IBEW) Local 3 attempted to persuade New York City to establish a municipal broadband provider, but such goals failed to materialize. Instead, organizers decided to create a workers cooperative internet service provider, in which the firm would be collectively owned by its workers, and turn over ownership of the mesh networks they built to their customers, once the customers finished financing it. One of the workers involved with the creation of the cooperative, named People's Choice, said that Spectrum's inaction helped motivate the striking employees to create the firm. The striking workers partnered with local organizing group Metro IAF and energy startup BlocPower to obtain funding.

In April 2021, Gizmodo reported that People's Choice typically charged between 300 and 400 United States dollars to install the networks, which they often broke down into monthly payments of 10 to 20 dollars. In comparison, Gizmodo noted that the services offered by Spectrum range from 50 to 150 dollars per month, which represents a significant cost barrier for low-income residents in the city. In October 2021, PBS NewsHour reported that People's Choice had provided free internet to 700 residents in the Bronx, which they intend to keep free for the first year, then charge 15 dollars per month.

One of the founders of People's Choice said of the business that "this is not a charity, this is a sustainable social enterprise", and another striking worker estimated that a few dozen workers were already employed by the firm, which he claimed already covered "most of the Bronx". One of the founders of the firm said that he often explains to customers that People's Choice is "a bunch of strikers that work for Spectrum" in order to avoid complex terminology associated with the firm's structure.

== Reactions ==
New York City Mayor Bill De Blasio voiced solidarity with the striking International Brotherhood of Electrical Workers (IBEW), and also warned Spectrum that "Like all cable franchise agreements, Spectrum’s is governed by federal law, which has strict guidelines regarding when a franchise can and cannot be renewed", a threat that the city may not renew their agreement with Spectrum to allow them to operate in the city. New York City Council member Barry Grodenchik, who sits on the council's Subcommittee on Zoning and Franchises, has also threatened to refuse the renewal of Spectrum's ability to operate in the city, stating "I cannot vote to extend their franchise agreement because of how they treat their workers."

Despite the voiced support from a number New York City officeholders, some of the union members remain skeptical of such action, with one saying "even after the vote, the cable company is going to lawyer up and just going to fight the city for years without a franchise agreement. So they don’t really give a shit."
