= 2017 Spain transportation strikes =

Labor disputes in Spain

The 2017 Spain transportation strikes are strikes primarily made up of by transport services, especially taxis, railways, and buses.

== Political and social context ==
Many of the strikers have used the Madrid Pride events to draw more attention to their causes and to create greater financial effects through their strikes. The Madrid Pride events are the celebrations held in the center of Madrid the weekend after June 28, the International Day of LGBT Pride. Since the events bring many people to Madrid, strikers have tried to limit public transport to weaken the city and make their importance felt. As a result, the Madrid government has set minimum levels of services to "ensure the necessary mobility and the provision of an essential service for citizens, accentuated also with the massive demand for use that is expected during these days, because of the celebration World Pride in Madrid." On July 1, the day of the Pride parade, the minimum services were 75%.

This was not the first time that transport workers have used large events to attract more attention and to create greater effects through their strikes. In February 2016 metro workers in Barcelona carried out strikes during the Mobile World Congress (MWC). In 2015, during the same congress, there were between 30,000 and 40,000 more passengers than usual each day. The 2015 strike has been followed by other strikes that have also attacked major events in order to claim greater effects.

== Strikes ==
=== Taxi strikes (and strikes against Uber and other ridesharing companies) ===
There have been many strike actions by taxi drivers protesting the perceived "labor intrusion" by ridesharing companies such as Uber and Cabify. On June 29, a 24-hour strike action took place. The lack of taxi drivers impeded transportation to and from Barcelona–El Prat Airport and Barcelona Sants railway station and pushed the metro and buses to their limits as peoples’ only alternative. The taxi drivers had originally planned a slow march through Barcelona at night, but given the "positive response" from the government, which had promised to pressure the Ministry of Public Works to stop granting more licenses to Uber and other outside services, the taxi drivers canceled their march.

Taxi drivers have argued that the ridesharing companies will raise rates as soon as they can seize a hold of transport services in Barcelona, similarly to how they have in other cities and "as has already happened in London." The Transport Law was the focus of the striker’s legal argument. Taxi drivers asked that the government, both the municipal and provincial, respect the proportion of licenses, which is one VTC license (which Cabify cars use) for every 30 taxis.

=== Strikes by metro operators ===
Metro operators from Madrid performed strikes from June 28 to July 2, which coincided with the World Pride 2017 celebrations in Madrid. The operators carried out these stoppages to try to earn better work benefits. They were looking for recognition of their professional status as "electric traction drivers." If they were granted this professional category, Social Security would credit the sicknesses derived from their work.

=== Bus strikes ===
On June 20, 2017 the first day of strikes by bus drivers in Galicia took place. According to the Government of Galicia, strikes affected 67,500 schoolchildren and 90% of regular lines on the first day. On the following day, the strike paralyzed almost 100% of the sector and left 57,000 without bus transportation services. On each day, the strikers massively supported the unions' call against the Government’s plans to reorganize the bus lines.

Since the beginning of the strikes, there has been a strong increase in the use of private vehicles in Galicia. Several unions have insisted that the strikes have been planned to continue until an agreement is reached. The unions that participated in the strikes include CCOO, UGT and CIG. In addition to the Government’s transport plan, these groups also protested against the lack of collective bargaining.
