= Northern Virginia airport workers' strikes =

The Northern Virginia airport worker strikes were a series of labor strikes held in 2015, 2016 and 2017 by employees of the Huntleigh USA Corporation, the primary contractor for airport workers at Washington Dulles International Airport and Ronald Reagan Washington National Airport. The strikes were held over poor pay, poor working conditions, and lack of employee benefits.

The strikes were held by the Huntleigh Workers Union as well as the Service Employees International Union.

== Background ==
In December 2016, airport employees struck demanding $15 hour minimum wage as many tipped employees were earning as little as $6.15 per hour.

In May 2017, workers at Dulles and Reagan Airports struck over pay and work conditions by Huntleigh after the Metropolitan Washington Airports Authority passed a policy to increase the minimum wage for airport workers starting with $11.55 an hour starting in January 2018, with that to increase to $12.15 in 2019 and $12.75 in 2020. Despite this, union workers were claiming to be paid only $6.50, by Huntleigh and had been suffering from wage theft. Another two day strike was held in December 2017.
