= 2017 Military Police of Espírito Santo strike =

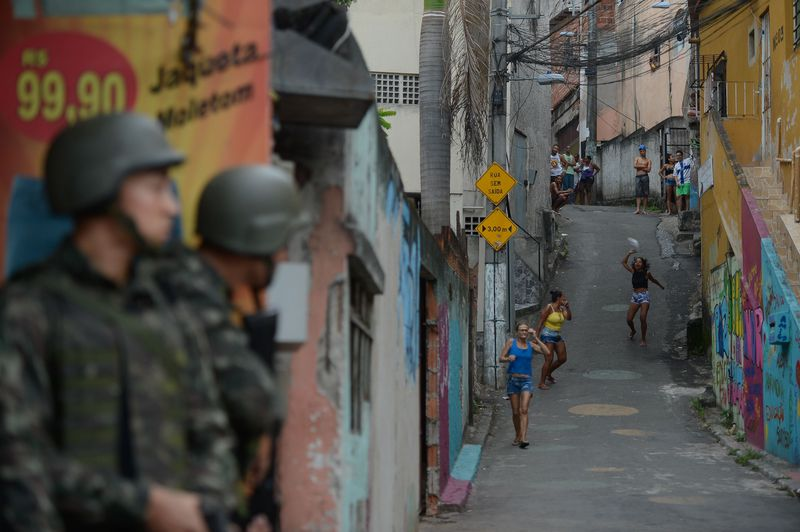
- Brazilian Army soldiers in a street in Vitória.
Date	4 February – 25 February 2017
Location	Espírito Santo, Brazil

Belligerents
Brazil Federal Government: Brazilian Armed Forces; Brazilian Army; Brazilian Navy; Brazilian Marine Corps; Ministry of Justice; National Public Security Force; Espírito Santo; Civil Police of Espírito Santo; Municipal Guards; Military Police of Espírito Santo (loyalists)	Gangs, criminals, looters and drug traffickers: Military Police of Espírito Santo (mutineers)

Commanders and leaders
Gen. Adilson Carlos Katibe; Gov. Paulo Hartung; César Colnago	Unknown

Strength
3.000 Army soldiers 200 Marines; 500 Officers National Forces; 6 Mowag Piranha III; 6 EE-11 Urutu; 3 Helicopters	Unknown

Casualties and losses
- 215 dead in total

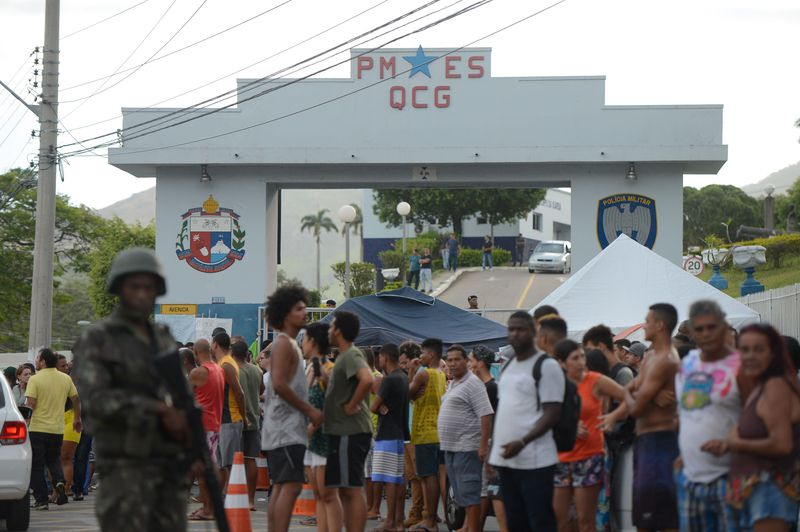
Headquarters of the General Command of the Military Police of Espírito Santo on February 7, 2017.

The 2017 Military Police of Espírito Santo strike was a strike by the Military Police of Espírito Santo State from 4 to 25 February 2017.

Military policemen in Espírito Santo launched to an illegal strike after demonstrations by relatives in the Metropolitan Region of Greater Vitória against low salaries. Local criminals exploited the strike and a crime wave of violence, carjacking and looting spread across Espírito Santo, with most public services and businesses being closed. The Espírito Santo state government called in assistance from the National Public Security Force and the Brazilian Armed Forces to restore law and order in Vitória and other cities until military policemen began to return to their duties after two weeks of strike action. By 25 February, all military policemen in Espírito Santo had ended their strikes.

An estimated 215 people were killed in Espírito Santo during the violence, and hundreds of military policemen were indicted for involvement in the illegal strike.

== Protests ==
On 3 February 2017, acquaintances and relatives of police officers protested in front of the Military Police Detachment blocking the exit of police vehicles in Serra. According to the police, the protests were peaceful. The strike itself began in the early hours of Saturday, 4 February, with protests in the cities of the Greater Vitória, Linhares, Aracruz, Colatina and Piúma.

Brazilian law prohibits strikes by military police officers. A decision by the Court of Justice of Espírito Santo on 6 February ordered the end of the strike and a daily fine of R$100,000 if the Military Police refused to comply with the order. The situation became more extreme when Humberto Mileip, vice president of the state Civil Police Union, said that after the Military Police's strike, the Civil Police would go on strike. "Our salary is one of the lowest in Brazil. In recent years, there has been no compensation for inflation", Mileip said.

There were also clashes between civilians themselves. Groups of residents of the region went to the barracks to convince the demonstrators to vacate the place. Thus, residents began to protest demanding the return of policing.

== Violence outbreak ==
According to the Civil Police Union of Espírito Santo, 215 people suffered violent deaths in the state since the protests began until 24 February.

With violence escalating steadily, the state government called for help from the Armed Forces and the National Force to contain the criminals.

In the strike period, shops, schools and health posts closed. The return to school was suspended for the public school students. Some bank branches and shopping malls have run regularly.

The Department of Legal Medicine of Vitória got its refrigerators full and with corpses scattered along its corridors. Under normal conditions, three or four corpses are examined and two are released per day in the department, which holds a maximum of 36.

In addition to the deaths, hundreds of stores were looted and about 200 vehicles were stolen during this period. The number of occurrences increased tenfold over the state average. According to the president of the Civil Police Union, this one does not have enough officials to investigate crimes of this magnitude.

== Response ==
César Colnago, the acting governor of Espírito Santo, told reporters on Wednesday that the 1,000 soldiers already sent to the state were not enough to stem an ongoing tide of violence. The killings in the state of Espírito Santo in the capital of Vitória and other cities erupted after friends and family of military police officers blocked their barracks over the weekend to demand higher pay for the officers, preventing patrols from cruising the streets. The union representing civil police officers said 101 people have been killed since police stopped patrolling last Friday night. The state government has not released a death toll.

Some buses circulated for a few hours Thursday morning, but union officials ordered them off the streets after the union's leader, Walace Belmiro Fernaziari, was shot dead near a bus terminal. The union said gunmen threatened two bus drivers, telling them they would set fire to buses that circulated. At least two buses have been torched over the past six days in Vitoria and several stores have been looted. Some shopping malls opened for a limited number of hours. Schools remained closed and medical services at public hospitals were interrupted.

Even though Espírito Santos' streets are being patrolled by both the National Guard and the Brazilian Army, the number of casualties ever since the Military Police decided to go on strike went over 100 on Thursday (the 9th). According to the Civil Police union, there have been 113 murders since last Friday (3rd). The governor's office has yet to confirm these numbers. 1,200 troops (from both the Army and the National Guard) have been deployed to the state since Monday (6th).

The strike, which has kept police officers off the streets of Espírito Santo, has seriously disrupted residents' day-to-day activities, such as grocery shopping, buying gas and going to the bank. Governor Paulo Hartung (Brazilian Democratic Movement Party) called the strike blackmail.

In February 2017, the Brazilian military sent elite troops and military aviation to Espírito Santo to take over security in the region. Over 100 people are reported to have been killed since police went on strike.
