= PCC =

PCC may refer to:

== Science and technology ==
- Pearson correlation coefficient (r), in statistics
- Periodic counter-current chromatography, a type of affinity chromatography
- Portable C Compiler, an early compiler for the C programming language
- Precipitated calcium carbonate, a chemical compound
- Proof-carrying code, a software mechanism that allows a host system to verify properties
- Pyridinium chlorochromate, a yellow-orange salt
- Pyrolytic chromium carbide coating, by vacuum deposition
- Point of common coupling, in electrical engineering

=== Medicine ===
- Pericardiocentesis, a procedure where fluid is aspirated from the pericardium
- Pheochromocytoma, a neuroendocrine tumor
- Posterior cingulate cortex, an anatomical brain region
- Prothrombin complex concentrate, a medication
- Propionyl-CoA carboxylase, catalyses the carboxylation reaction of propionyl CoA in the mitochondrial matrix
- 1-piperidinocyclohexanecarbonitrile, a precursor schedule II drug in the US

== Organizations ==
=== Companies ===
- Pacific Coffee Company
- PCC Community Markets, a food cooperative based in Seattle, Washington, US
- PCC SE, a German company
- Peoria Charter Coach Company, a bus company in Illinois, US
- Power Computing Corporation
- Power Corporation of Canada
- Precision Castparts Corp. in Portland, Oregon, US
- Printed Circuit Corporation, US

=== Religious ===
- Pacific Conference of Churches, the regional ecumenical organization in the Pacific region
- Pakistan Christian Congress
- Palmarian Catholic Church
- Pentecost Convention Centre
- Presbyterian Church in Canada

=== Education ===
- Pabna Cadet College
- Palmer College of Chiropractic
- Pasadena City College
- Penola Catholic College
- Pensacola Christian College
- Piedmont Community College
- Pima Community College
- Pitt Community College
- Pobalscoil Chloich Cheannfhaola
- Polk Community College, former name of Polk State College
- Portland Community College
- Presentation College, Chaguanas
- Pueblo Community College

=== Government and politics ===
- Pakistan Crypto Council
- Palestinian Central Council
- Palestinian Conciliation Commission
- Parti conservateur du Canada, the Conservative Party of Canada
- Partido Comunista Colombiano, the Colombian Communist Party
- Partido Comunista de Canarias, the Communist Party of the Canaries
- Partido Comunista de Cuba, the Communist Party of Cuba
- Partit dels i les Comunistes de Catalunya, Party of the Communists of Catalonia
- Parochial church council in the Church of England
- Patents County Court, former name of the Intellectual Property Enterprise Court in the United Kingdom
- Patient and Client Council (Northern Ireland)
- Perth City Council, Australia
- Peterborough City Council
- Philippine Competition Commission, independent quasi-judicial body of the Philippine government in charge of implementing the Philippine Competition Act
- Poison control center
- Police and crime commissioner, in England and Wales
- Porirua City Council, New Zealand
- Pradesh Congress Committee formerly Provincial Congress Committee, the provincial committee of the Congress Party in India
- Privacy Commissioner of Canada
- Public Construction Commission, a government agency in Taiwan

=== Others ===
- C. Paul Phelps Correctional Center
- Clef Club of Jazz and Performing Arts
- Pacific Coast Conference, a defunct US college athletic conference
- Panama Canal Commission
- People's Computer Company
- Philadelphia Canoe Club
- Plains Conservation Center
- Plainfield Curling Club
- Polynesian Cultural Center
- Prerogative Court of Canterbury, historically an English church court with jurisdiction over the estates of deceased persons
- Press Complaints Commission, a defunct former regulatory body for British printed newspapers and magazines
- Primeiro Comando da Capital, a Brazilian organized crime syndicate
- Program for Cooperative Cataloging

== Transportation ==
- PCC streetcar, a common streetcar design
- Presidents' Conference Committee (Toronto streetcar), a streetcar used in Toronto Canada
- Personal Car Communicator, in Volvo Cars
- Pseudo city code, in air travel
- Pure car carrier, a type of roll-on/roll-off ship
- A US Navy hull classification symbol: Patrol craft, control (PCC)

== Other uses ==
- Phoenix Comicon
- Pistol-caliber carbine
- Police clearance certificate
- Polymer City Chronicles, a webcomic
- Porsche Carrera Cup
- Portland cement concrete
- Pregnancy care center
- Prince Charles Cinema
- Protected cell company
- Puyi language (an ISO 639-3 language code: pcc)

== See also ==
- Philippine Collegiate Champions League (PCCL)
