= Marset =

Marset is a surname. Notable people with the surname include:

- Lucas Torró Marset (born 1994), Spanish footballer
- Sebastián Marset (born 1991), Uruguayan former drug lord
