= Low emissivity =

State of low thermal energy

Low emissivity (low e or low thermal emissivity) refers to a surface condition that emits low levels of radiant thermal (heat) energy. All materials absorb, reflect, and emit radiant energy according to Planck's law but here, the primary concern is a special wavelength interval of radiant energy, namely thermal radiation of materials. In common use, especially building applications, the temperature range of approximately -40 to +80 degrees Celsius is the focus, but in aerospace and industrial process engineering, much broader ranges are of practical concern.

== Definition ==
Emissivity is the value given to materials based on the ratio of heat emitted compared to a perfect black body, on a scale from zero to one. A black body would have an emissivity of 1 and a perfect reflector would have a value of 0.

Kirchhoff's law of thermal radiation states that absorption equals emissivity opaque (ε_{opaque}) for every specific wavelength/frequency (materials often have quite different emissivities at different wavelengths). Therefore, if the asphalt has an emissivity value of 0.90 at a specific wavelength (say wavelength of 10 micrometers, or room temperature thermal radiation), its thermal absorptance value would also be 0.90. This means that it absorbs and emits 90 percent of radiant thermal energy. As it is an opaque material, the remaining 10 percent must be reflected. Conversely, a low-e material such as aluminum foil has a thermal emissivity/absorptance value of 0.03 and as an opaque material, the thermal reflectance value must be 1.0 - 0.03 =0.97, meaning it reflects 97 percent of radiant thermal energy. Low-emissivity building materials include window glass manufactured with metal-oxide coatings as well as house wrap materials, reflective thermal insulations, and other forms of radiant thermal barriers.

The thermal emissivity of various surfaces is listed in the following table.

Materials surface	Thermal emissivity
Silver, polished	0.02
Aluminum foil	0.03
Marble, smooth	0.56
Paper, roofing or white	0.88 to 0.86
Asphalt	0.88
Plaster, rough	0.89
Brick	0.90
Marble, polished or white	0.89 to 0.92
Concrete, rough	0.91
Glass, smooth (uncoated)	0.91
Limestone	0.92

== Low-emissivity windows ==
Window glass is by nature highly thermally emissive, as indicated in the table above. To improve thermal control (insulation and solar optical properties) thin-film coatings are applied to the raw soda–lime glass. There are two primary methods in use: pyrolytic chemical vapor deposition and magnetron sputtering. The first involves the deposition of fluorinated tin dioxide at high temperatures. Pyrolytic coatings are usually applied at the float glass plant when the glass is manufactured. The second involves depositing thin silver layers with antireflection layers. Magnetron sputtering uses large vacuum chambers with multiple deposition chambers depositing 5 to 10 or more layers in succession. Silver-based films are environmentally unstable and must be enclosed in insulated glazing or an Insulated Glass Unit (IGU) to maintain their properties over time. Specially designed coatings may be applied to one or more surfaces of insulated glass. One type of coating (low-e coatings) reduces the emission of radiant infrared energy, thus tending to keep the heat on the side of the glass where it originated while letting visible light pass. This results in glazing with better control of energy - heat originating from indoors in winter remains inside (the warm side), while heat during summer does not emit from the exterior, keeping it cooler inside.

Glass can be made with differing thermal emissivities, but this is not used for windows. Certain properties such as the iron content may be controlled, changing the thermal emissivity properties of glass. This "naturally" low thermal emissivity is found in some formulations of borosilicate or Pyrex. Naturally, low-e glass does not have the property of reflecting near infrared (NIR)/thermal radiation; instead, this type of glass has higher NIR transmission, leading to undesirable heat loss (or gain) in a building with that type of window.

=== Criticism of low-E windows ===
It has been suggested that the high reflectivity of low-E windows can contribute to a concentration of solar radiation which can potentially cause damage to their surroundings; damage to the sidings of homes and to automobiles has been reported not only in news stories, but may cause legal issues as well.

Low-e windows may also block radio frequency signals. Buildings without distributed antenna systems may then suffer degraded cell phone reception.

== Reflective thermal insulation ==
Reflective thermal insulation is typically fabricated from aluminum foil with a variety of core materials such as low-density polyethylene foam, polyethylene bubbles, fiberglass, or similar materials. Each core material presents its own set of benefits and drawbacks based on its ability to provide a thermal break, deaden sound, absorb moisture, and resist combustion during a fire. When aluminum foil is used as the facing material, reflective thermal insulation can stop 97% of radiant heat transfer. Recently, some reflective thermal insulation manufacturers have switched to a metalized polyethylene facing. The long-term efficiency and durability of such facings are still undetermined.

Reflective thermal insulation can be installed in a variety of applications and locations including residential, agricultural, commercial, aerospace, and industrial structures. Some common installations include house wraps, duct wraps, pipe wraps, under radiant floors, inside wall cavities, roof systems, attic systems, aircraft fuselage systems, space probe systems, and crawl spaces. Reflective thermal insulation can be used as a stand-alone product in many applications but can also be used in combination systems with mass insulation where higher R-values are required.

== Military applications ==
Low emissivity coatings have found applications in stealth technology, reducing the thermal infrared emissions from military equipment in the short-wave, mid-wave and long-wave infrared portions of the electromagnetic spectrum.

== See also ==
- Selective surface
