= Primeiro Comando da Capital =

Brazilian criminal organization

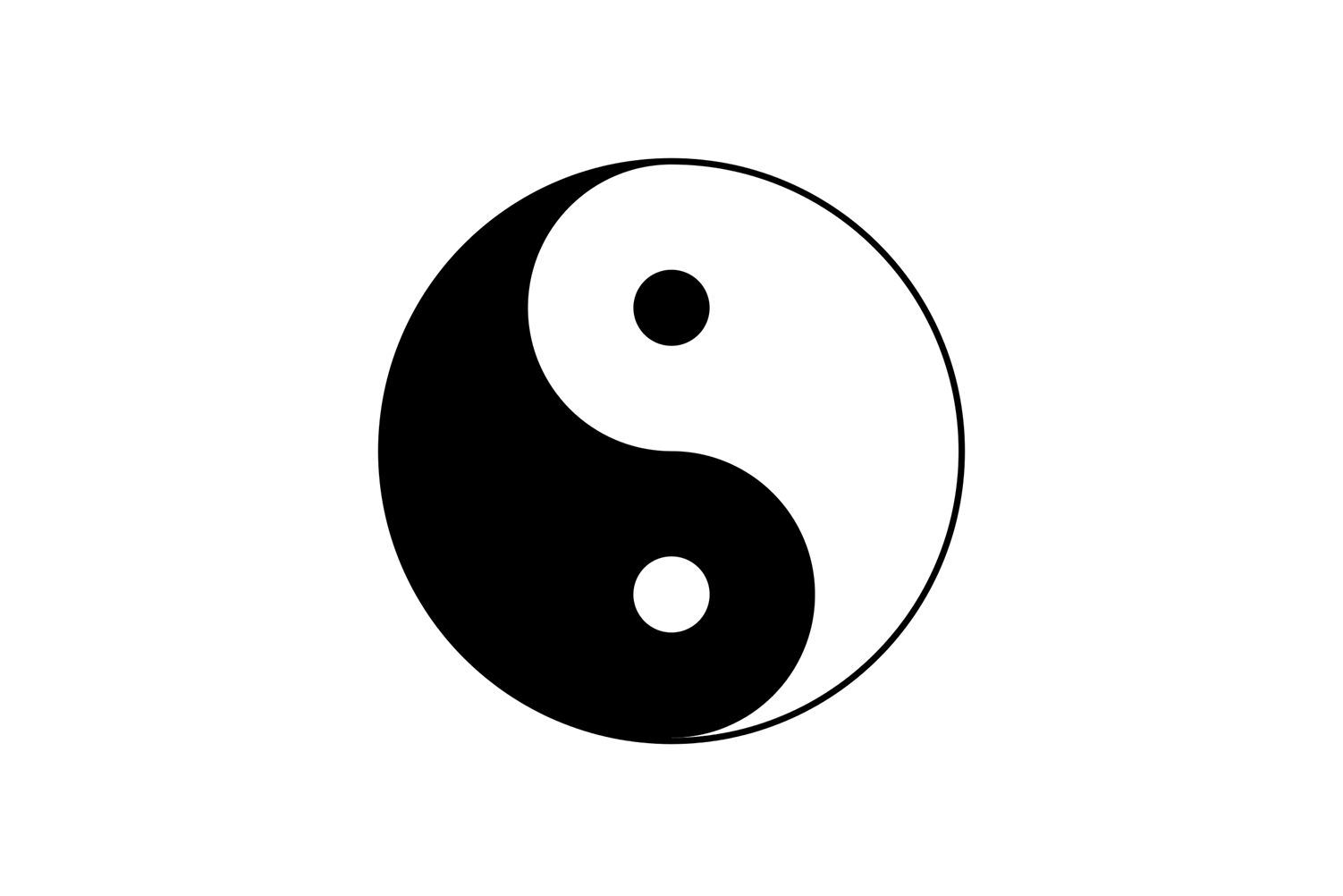
- The taijitu is commonly used as the PCC emblem.
- Founded: 31 August 1993; 33 years ago
- Founders: Geleião; Césinha; Miza; Isaías Esquisito; Paixão; Du Cara Gorda; Bicho Feio; Dafé
- Founding location: Taubaté House of Custody and Treatment, Taubaté, São Paulo, Brazil
- Years active: 1993–present
- Territory: Main territory: São Paulo, Minas Gerais, Paraná, Santa Catarina, Mato Grosso do Sul, Mato Grosso, Rondônia, Roraima, Acre, Amazonas, Pará, Tocantins, Ceará and Piauí.; Significant influence: Brazil: All federative units.; South America: All sovereign states and French Guiana.; Small-scale activity: North America: United States and Mexico.; Europe: Western Europe, Iberia, Italy and the Balkans.; Asia: Lebanon, Turkey, Philippines, China and Japan.; Africa: West Africa, Angola, South Africa and Mozambique.
- Ethnicity: Brazilians (predominantly), Paraguayans, Argentines, Bolivians, Uruguayans, Colombians, Peruvians, Venezuelans, Portuguese, Cape Verdeans and Brazilian Americans
- Membership: 40,000 lifetime members + 60,000 "contractors" (2023)
- Leaders: Marco Willians Herbas Camacho (surrendered) ("de jure"); "Sintonia geral final" (de facto)
- Criminal activities: Drug trafficking, arms trafficking, tobacco smuggling, alcohol smuggling, wildlife smuggling, counterfeiting, currency forgery, illegal logging, illegal mining, television piracy, fuel theft, carjacking, chop shops, bank robbery, extortion, racketeering, fraud, loan sharking, money laundering, illegal gambling, pimping, kidnapping, contract killing and narcoterrorism
- Allies: Latin America: TCP, GDE, BDM, EPP, FARC, PCU, CJNG, Tren de Aragua, Clan Insfran.; Europe: Albanian mafia, Russian mafia, 'Ndrangheta, Group America.; Asia: Turkish mafia, Lebanese mafia, Hezbollah, Yakuza, Triad.; Africa: Nigerian mafia, Cape Verdean mafia.
- Rivals: Comando Vermelho; Família do Norte; Sindicato do Crime; Primeiro Grupo Catarinense; Bala na Cara; Primeiro Comando de Vitória; Comando Revolucionário Brasileiro; Comando da Paz; Okaida; Clan Rotela
- Ideology: Far-left (historically)

The Primeiro Comando da Capital (Note: Brazilian Portuguese pronunciation: [pɾiˈmejɾu koˈmɐ̃du da kapiˈtaw]) (PCC; lit. 'First Command of the Capital') (Note: Also referred to in Portuguese as 15.3.3 (abbreviated 15), Quinze (lit. 'Fifteen'), Partido (lit. 'Party') or Partido do Crime (lit. 'Party of Crime'). In English, commonly called the "First Capital Command".) is a Brazilian criminal organization. According to a 2023 The Economist report, the PCC is Latin America's biggest drug gang, with a membership of 40,000 lifetime members plus 60,000 "contractors". Its name refers to the São Paulo state capital, the city of São Paulo.

The group is primarily based in the state of São Paulo, although it is active throughout the rest of Brazil, South America, West Africa and Europe. An international expansion fueled by the cocaine trade made the PCC establish a profitable partnership with other international criminal organizations, such as the Italian 'Ndrangheta, the Chinese Triads and Hezbollah. As of 2023, the group runs over 50% of Brazil's drug exports to Europe. Through the cocaine trade routes to Europe, the PCC also established itself as a central player in the West African cocaine trade, with its members being able to exert control over neighbourhoods in cities such as Lagos and Abuja. According to a leaked Portuguese intelligence report, the group has around 1,000 associates in Lisbon, while it may have as many as 2,000 more members spread through the rest of the world.

Historically, the PCC has been responsible for several criminal activities such as drugs and arms trafficking, smuggling, murders, prison riots, bank robberies, protection rackets, pimping, kidnappings-for-ransom, money laundering, bribery, loan sharking and illegal gambling, with an expansion focused on drug trafficking since the 2010s. As of 2023, the PCC is currently transitioning into a global mafia, being able to influence politics and penetrate the legal economy. According to São Paulo state authorities, the group has had a yearly revenue of at least R$4.9 billion (US$876.1 million) since 2020. In August 2025, the Brazilian Federal Revenue revealed that the organization controlled at least R$30 billion (US$5.36 billion) in property investments.

The PCC is often mentioned to have a different doctrine to other Brazilian cartels, with a business model that favors the quiet expansion of markets over violent and expensive turf wars and confrontations with the state that would draw unwanted attention. The Global Initiative Against Transnational Organized Crime noted that the PCC's ability to negotiate with rivals rather than expelling them has permitted the group to make use of preestablished criminal networks and preexisting logistics know-how along the cocaine value chain, encouraging peaceful cooperation between different groups and producing greater economic efficiency by reducing operating costs. However, the group has been responsible for waves of extreme violence, including targeted political violence and Narcoterrorism, upon having their interests threatened.

== History and operations ==
=== Founding ===
The PCC was originally founded on August 31, 1993, by eight prisoners at the Taubaté Penitentiary, known popularly as "Piranhão" (lit. 'Big Piranha'), in the state of São Paulo. At the time, this was considered the safest jail in the state. The group initially got together during a football game, where they founded a team called "Comando Capital" (lit. 'Capital Command'). The prisoners had been transferred from the city of São Paulo to Taubaté as punishment for bad behavior. The game infamously ended in widespread fights and chaos among the prisoners, leading to a riot which involved the brutal killing and decapitation of both the deputy director and a prisoner with special privileges, the head of the latter being put on a stake.

The initial members were Misael "Misa" Aparecido da Silva, Wander Eduardo "Cara Gorda" Ferreira, Antônio Carlos Roberto da Paixão, Isaías "Esquisito" Moreira do Nascimento, Ademar "Dafé" dos Santos, Antônio "Bicho Feio" Carlos dos Santos, César "Césinha" Augusto Roris da Silva and José "Geleião" Márcio Felício. PCC, which is also sometimes referred to as the "Party of Crime" and "15.3.3" (following the order of the letters "P" and "C" in the former Portuguese alphabet) was founded with a clear agenda, to "fight the oppression inside the São Paulo penitentiary system" and "avenge the death of 111 prisoners": the victims of the previous year's Carandiru massacre, when the São Paulo State Military Police stormed the now-defunct Carandiru Penitentiary and massacred prisoners in the 9th cell block.

The organization soon adopted the slogan "Paz, Justiça e Liberdade" (PJL; lit. 'Peace, Justice and Freedom') (Note: Sometimes written "Paz, Justiça, Liberdade e Igualdade" (PJLI; lit. 'Peace, Justice, Freedom and Equality')) as their motto and made use of the Chinese taijitu ("yin and yang symbol") as their emblem, claiming it represents a "way to balance good and evil with wisdom". In February 2001, Idemir "Sombra" Carlos Ambrósio became the most prominent leader of the organization when he coordinated, by cell phone, simultaneous rebellions in 29 São Paulo state prisons, in which 16 prisoners were killed. "Sombra", also referred to as "father", was beaten to death in the Piranhão five months later by five PCC members in an internal struggle for the general command of the group. The PCC was initially led by Geleião and Cesinha, who were responsible for a short-lived alliance with another criminal organization, Rio de Janeiro's Comando Vermelho ("Red Command"; CV). At the time, the group adopted many of CV's far-left beliefs and began advocating for revolution and the destruction of Brazil's capitalist system.

Geleião and Cesinha, from the Bangu Penitentiary where they were held, went on to coordinate violent attacks against public buildings. Considered radicals by another moderate current of the PCC, they used terrorism to intimidate authorities of the prison system and were withdrawn from leadership in November 2002, when the faction was taken over by its current leader, Marcos "Marcola" Willians Herbas Camacho. Marcola would eventually order the deaths of both Geleião and Cesinha for testifying to the police, as well as for attempting to leave the faction and creating a splinter group called the "Terceiro Comando da Capital" (Third Capital Command, TCC), which is now considered to be defunct.

=== "Trade union of crime" ===
The PCC first appeared as an entity capable of maintaining order in the lawless Brazilian prison system, providing protection to prisoners, imposing rules and punishing crimes such as rapes, murders and extortions, as well as seeking a peaceful resolution to conflicts between inmates. In return, members would be charged a monthly fee to pay for lawyers, provide aid to families in need and to pay for items for arrested members.

In the late 1990s, the São Paulo State Government sought to separate the PCC leadership in order to dismantle the organization, sending leaders to different penitentiaries across the countries. The action backfired however, as the leaders' "trade union discourse" resonated with inmates across the country, expanding the group in the process. In the late 1990s and early 2000s, the PCC became notorious for high-profile bank robberies and prison rebellions, including the largest bank robbery in the country's history, where armed gunmen carried out a heist on the central Banco Banespa branch in São Paulo, escaping with R$32.5 million.

Under the leadership of Marcola, also known as "Playboy", currently serving a 232-year sentence, the PCC took part in the March 2003 murder of Judge Antônio José Machado Dias, who ran the Penitentiary Readaptation Center (CRP) from Presidente Bernardes, São Paulo, then Brazil's most strict supermax-style prison. The PCC also announced its objective to use prison uprisings as a way to demoralize the government and to destroy the CRP.

In May 2006, the PCC carried out its biggest attacks, in retaliation against an attempt to transfer the PCC leadership to high-security prisons. The attacks lasted for 4 days and caused 564 deaths. According to the São Paulo State prosecutor Márcio Christino, PCC founders Cesinha and Geleião were more extreme in their methods, intending to use car bombs to blow up the São Paulo Stock Exchange building. Marcola disagreed, believing the PCC had more to gain by keeping a low profile. Such belief was strengthened after Marcola was imprisoned in the same facility as the Chilean guerilla fighter Mauricio Hernández Norambuena in 2006, who taught Marcola not to carry out pointless attacks to the detriment of the civilian population, as those would only facilitate state repression.

=== Expansion into domestic drug trafficking ===
From the early 2000s, the PCC started consolidating its power outside of the prison system, expanding its influence as providers of order and conflict solvers into low-income neighbourhoods throughout São Paulo, known as favelas. During its early expansion phase, the PCC sold drugs at cost price to lesser drug dealers, helping expand their reach, and eventually taking over their drug dens when collecting debts (using a strategy akin to debt-trap diplomacy). This allowed the gang to form a cartel that dominated the city of São Paulo. Eventually, every drug den in SP came to be under the PCC's control, being either owned or "licensed" by the PCC, in a consignment model where an independent dealer exclusively buys drugs supplied by the group.

One of the main differences between the PCC and other Brazilian criminal groups is that territorial control is enforced without the open brandishing of firearms ("ostentação", or ostentation) that characterizes groups such as the CV in Rio de Janeiro. Individuals that fail to comply with the group's "discipline" are judged by the "crime courts", with sentences that can range from beatings to summary executions. Rather than expanding by territorial conquest alone, the PCC is able to develop its illicit activities more efficiently by focusing on the regulation and control of markets combined with a monopoly on violence and discipline. The PCC's expansion and dominion over the state of São Paulo is seen by researchers as one of the reasons behind the sharp decrease in the state's homicide rate since the 2000s. The criminal group's reasoning is that murders attract police attention and, consequently, cause problems in drug sales.

In 2014, the Brazilian Federal Police launched Operation Oversea, which first identified the PCC's cocaine shipments to Europe, before the group had consolidated drug trade routes or perfected money laundering schemes.

=== Control over Paraguayan drug trafficking routes and focus on export market ===
A turning point for the PCC was set in 2014 when it pivoted away from domestic sales and turned towards the more lucrative export market. The group cemented its influence over the Port of Santos, the biggest port in South America, and evolved into a multinational organization with presence and influence across five continents through alliances with other groups such as the 'Ndrangheta as well as Mexican, Colombian, Russian and African criminal networks. GI-TOC fieldwork highlighted that the value chain often starts with stolen or second-hand vehicles in Brazil exchanged for drugs in countries such as Bolivia and Paraguay.

From 2016, the group cemented its influence over the Paraguayan border, an important trade route for cocaine supplied from Bolivia, Peru and Colombia and for arms trafficked from Paraguay and the United States. It involved the murder of Jorge Rafaat, a Brazilian drug lord of Lebanese ancestry. Rafaat's armored Hummer truck was ambushed in Pedro Juan Caballero by more than 100 mercenaries, including a Toyota SW4 featuring a concealed Browning .50 MG which fired more than 400 rounds into the drug lord's truck. The 10-minute shootout left Rafaat dead and 8 more injured. About 40 of his associates were subsequently murdered. This allowed for a major expansion in the following years, with the Brazilian Public Prosecutor's Office estimating that the PCC had reached over 30,000 'baptized' members in 2018, with at least 2 million more allied to the group.

In 2016, the breakdown of a 20-year truce between the PCC and the Red Command (CV) led to a massive uptick in violence across Brazil, with the PCC embarking on an aggressive expansion campaign by absorbing less organized gangs and financing local groups to operate as proxies against the CV across the country, such as the B13 gang in Acre and the CV's rivals in Rio de Janeiro.

In early 2017, a series of gruesome prison riots made headlines worldwide as the PCC fought for control of the North Region against the Família do Norte (FDN), erstwhile allies with the Red Command. On January 1, dozens of PCC prisoners were massacred at the Anísio Jobim Penitentiary Complex in Manaus after a prison riot, with the PCC retaliating in prison riots in Boa Vista and in Natal in the same week. Dismemberments, beheadings and prisoners being burned alive were commonplace during all three prison riots.

In 2020, Ryan C. Berg of the Center for Strategic International Studies reported on the importance of the Solimões River drug trade route, calling it a "Latin American Silk Road for drug trafficking" connecting Peru and Colombia to the Atlantic Ocean. The region was violently contested by the PCC, CV and FDN, as well as their local proxies, in a three-way conflict. As a result of fierce domestic competition, the PCC's overseas operations became key to its expansion, turning control over the Solimões river into a strategic objective.

In 2021, the "King of the Frontier" Fahd Jamil Georges, who ruled over drug trafficking and the jogo do bicho in the Ponta Porã region for over five decades, turned himself in to authorities seeking protection, claiming that the PCC was after him.

Over the next months, a wave of contract killings fueled fears that Paraguay might become a narcostate. In May 2022, the Paraguayan prosecutor Marcelo Pecci was shot dead while on honeymoon with his wife in Baru, a tourist island off Cartagena, Colombia. Initial investigations raised the possibility of the PCC being behind the hit, until Paraguayan and Uruguayan cartels allied to the PCC were implicated in the murder. A year earlier, the mayor of Pedro Juan Caballero, José Carlos Acevedo, had also been murdered when leaving the city hall.

=== International expansion and penetration into the legal economy ===
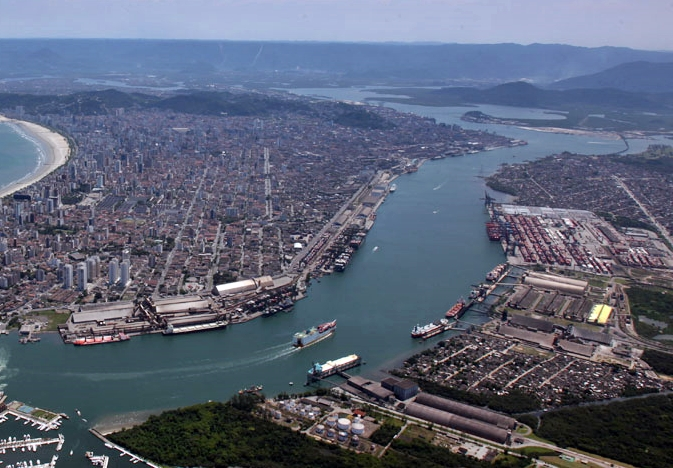
The Port of Santos is a key asset in the PCC's overseas expansion.

On 15 December 2021, the U.S. Department of the Treasury announced new sanctions against organized crime actors worldwide such as the PCC, along with Mexican cartels and Chinese groups linked to the fentanyl trade.

The PCC's deals with Western European criminal organizations, especially the 'Ndrangheta, have facilitated exports into Europe, including through West Africa, from where the group has become a central player in supplying Africa's cocaine market. The 2020 arrest of a Brazilian drug trafficker linked to the 'Ndrangheta and to senior PCC members in Maputo has also contributed to evidence that the group had been active in southern and eastern Africa for years. The PCC has been noted for its ability to create ad hoc and structured business partnerships with other Brazilian groups (including private entities and the state) as well as with foreign criminal networks such as Nigerian, Cape Verdean, Mozambican, Lebanese, Russian, Italian and Eastern European mafias.

By 2022, the PCC had become one of the world's most complex criminal organizations, able to operate across a spectrum of illicit supply chains including drugs, firearms, illegal gold mining and vehicles. Those operations are rooted in an extensive financial infrastructure that has penetrated the legal economy in businesses such as public transport, trash disposal and real estate investment and that extends to legal and financial support to its members through different divisions, called sintonias. This organizational flexibility, combined with a high degree of commercial autonomy for its members, has underpinned the PCC's expansion.

By late 2024, several investigations pointed to an increased sophistication in the group's money laundering operations and involvement with sports, including making use of online gambling websites and investing into Portuguese third division football clubs. According to deceased PCC informant Antônio Gritzbach, Danilo Lima de Oliveira, a sports agent who took part in Emerson Royal's transfer to Barcelona FC, had been previously involved with the criminal organization.

In mid-2023 and early 2024, deaths of ROTA policemen in the Baixada Santista region, considered a PCC stronghold, led the São Paulo state government to crack down on organized crime in the area. In November 2023, the Brazilian Navy also took up an anti-narcotics role in the Port of Santos, employing divers and dogs in an attempt to locate drugs hidden in hard to reach places such as inside the hull in sea chests. During the crackdown, the RFB also detected an increase in drug seizures on ships heading to Australia, Hong Kong, Singapore, Indonesia and Taiwan, determining that docked vessels with those destinations should also undergo scans for illegal narcotics. Previously, scans were only required for vessels heading to Africa and Europe.

In February 2024, Brazilian media reported on a split taking place among the PCC leadership, known as the "Sintonia geral final" ("general final syntony"). Two PCC leaders, Roberto "Tiriça" Soriano and Abel "Vida Loka" Andrade ordered Marcola's death for supposedly snitching after Marcola referred to Tiriça as a "psychopath" in a recorded conversation with federal officers, due to Tiriça having ordered the death of a female federal officer, Melissa Araújo, who worked as a psychologist in a federal penitentiary, in 2017. The recording was used by the prosecution during Tiriça's trial, in which he was sentenced to 31 years in prison. By 27 March, it was reported that Marcola's allies had quelled the insurrection within the PCC, with Tiriça and Vida Loka having been expelled, having their deaths ordered and losing ownership over cars, mansions, drug sales points and stakes in money-laundering companies. As a result, preliminary information obtained by the São Paulo Civil Police pointed to Tiriça and Vida Loka seeking the creation of a new criminal faction in São Paulo, called the Primeiro Comando Puro ("Pure First Command"), as well as seeking alliances with the CV.

In March 2026, key PCC affiliate Sebastián Marset was arrested and then extradited to the United States.

== Structure ==
Example of baseline PCC structure

The PCC is organized through several divisions, called "Sintonias" ("Syntonies"), each responsible for a specific subsection or region of the group's operation. At the top level, all syntonies must answer to the "Sintonia geral final" ("General final syntony"), a group of incarcerated PCC leaders to which Marcola belongs. The group's structure follows a modular design, with regional sintonias each having their own substructure.

Berg notes that the PCC's decentralized structure has enabled rapid expansion opportunities through a franchise model in which "entrepreneurial inmates" who wish to establish a local PCC branch must be baptized, abide by the group's rules and pay "union dues" to the central organization, who maintains control over the most important elements of strategy through the sintonia geral final. An emphasis on equality and on the sharing of managerial decision-making power, as well as a general readiness to assume positions of leadership, allows the organization to establish a command even without clearly defined commanders. Outside prisons, the decentralized structure helps maximize profits by enabling the PCC to have its drug trafficking network follow a consignment basis, driving down the cost as lesser gangs and individual dealers engage in competitive bidding for the right to sell PCC goods.

Though often inconsistent due to the group's clandestine nature and autonomy, sources converge on a general management structure consisting of six "syntonies":

=== Sintonia geral final ===
The "Final General Syntony" is the supreme PCC leadership. All of its members, including Marcola, are incarcerated. This group maintains constant contact with several subordinate sintonias, who are in turn responsible for running the group's operations:

=== Sintonia dos Gravatas ===
The "Syntony of the Ties" is responsible for hiring lawyers and maintaining the PCC's legal support network.

=== Sintonia Restrita ===
The "Restricted Syntony" is akin to an intelligence agency, sintonia restrita members are responsible for the surveillance and assassination of targets marked for death by the sintonia geral final, mapping their routes and day-to-day activities before eventually conducting assassination attempts. Furthermore, the group is responsible for producing intelligence relating to the laundering, moving and safekeeping of large sums of money, having members dedicated to preparing vehicles and safehouses with that objective in mind.

A technical report by the São Paulo Public Prosecutor's Office described how sintonia restrita members also employed a "sophisticated" communications network, described as a "compartmentalized closed network" where, periodically, several cellphones were acquired by the PCC and a specific person was responsible for their configuration prior to their distribution amongst sintonia restrita's members. During operations, individuals executing orders were only able to communicate with the contacts present on their phone, using end-to-end encrypted applications such as WhatsApp and Surespot.

=== Sintonia Financeira ===
The "Financial Syntony" runs the PCC's accounting, finances, and commands several subordinate sintonias responsible for all of the group's commercial operations ranging from drug sales points to marijuana and cocaine exports and lotteries, as well as the money laundering.

=== Sintonia do Cadastro ===
The "Registration Syntony" is responsible for organizational records management. A PCC member who falls out of line, fails to communicate or pay his fees is considered "out of syntony", being expelled and added to the "Black Book". Out of syntony members are required to pay their dues until a specific deadline before being blacklisted. If blacklisted, a member is permanently expelled and marked for death by the registration syntony.

=== Sintonia da Ajuda ===
The "Help Syntony" distributes aid such as pensions and staple food.

== Overseas alliances ==
=== 'Ndrangheta ===
The 'Ndrangheta has operated in Brazil since the 1970s, but an alliance between various 'ndrine clans and the Primeiro Comando da Capital since the mid-2010s has increased the mafia's presence in the country. A reliable stream of cocaine from Brazil is crucial to the 'Ndrangheta's grip on the European cocaine market, and the alliance has enabled a massive overseas expansion for the PCC through access to different markets across Africa, Europe and Asia. A share of cocaine exported by the PCC and the 'Ndrangheta moves through West Africa, and international and regional law enforcement investigations have implicated 'Ndrangheta elements in cocaine trafficking in several countries across the region, including Senegal, Niger, Ghana and Côte d'Ivoire. 'Ndrine clans operate in West Africa through the stable presence of individuals in certain countries, as well as through trusted brokers established through visits by 'Ndrangheta clan family members.

Several important 'Ndrangheta bosses have been arrested in Brazil, such as Domenico Pelle, Nicola Assisi and Rocco Morabito.

According to investigations, Morabito is considered one of the main associates of André Macedo Oliveira (known as "André do Rap"), considered one of the current leaders of the PCC.

=== Hezbollah ===
According to the Brazilian Federal Police, the PCC maintains commercial relations with the Lebanese organization and militant group Hezbollah, specifically in illegal cigarette contraband, arms trafficking and money laundering schemes. Cooperation between the two groups happens mostly in the Triple Frontier area between Brazil, Paraguay and Argentina.

In June 2023, the São Paulo Civil Police arrested Garip Uç, a Turkish chemist associated with Hezbollah during an operation in Praia Grande. Investigations later pointed to Moroccan hashish being imported to Brazil by a criminal network that involved the PCC, 'Ndrangheta, the Balkan mafias and Hezbollah, by way of Barakat clan entrepreneurs who operated in the Triple Frontier.

== High-profile incidents ==
=== 2002 foiled terror attacks ===
In October 2002, the Civil Police of São Paulo reported that PCC had planned a series of attacks against the state government, including a possible terrorist attack against the headquarters of the São Paulo Stock Exchange (B3). These attacks were reportedly cancelled after the arrest of one member, which made the leaders abandon the plan. Until then, there had only been reports of anonymous threats made by telephone, but the building was not evacuated.

=== 2006 attacks ===
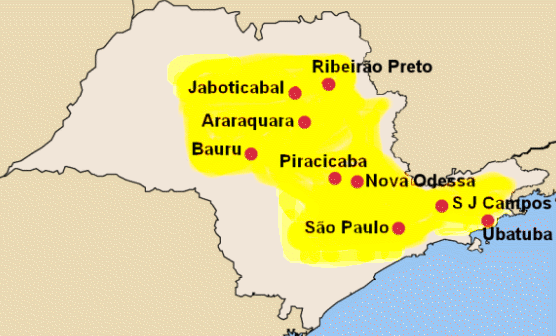
Sites in São Paulo State attacked by PCC in 2006.

The PCC received countrywide attention with a series of attacks that took place from May 12 to May 17, 2006. The main targets were public establishments such as police stations, justice forums, buses, inter alia. The attacks took place as a response to a state government plan to transfer prisoners to a high-security prison in Presidente Venceslau and represented the bloodiest assault of its kind in the history of Brazil's richest state, São Paulo. The attacks were organized by gang members in prison via cell phone.

=== 2012 attacks ===
By June 2012, another wave of attacks against the police began. On May 28, six PCC members were killed in a shootout with ROTA members. However, investigations later showed that one suspect, 31-year old Anderson Minhano, was taken from the scene alive and placed in a ROTA cruiser, where it was discovered that he was wanted for the point-blank murder of a police officer two months earlier. The PCC member was then taken to Ayrton Senna highway where he was tortured and executed on the side of the road, an action witnessed by a civilian passerby. As a result, the PCC leadership ordered retaliation against military police officers, allowing members with debts to the organization to clear their slates by murdering police officers.

Throughout the next few months, off-duty police were targeted while driving to and from work, grocery shopping or moonlighting, and buses were set on fire. Police retaliated, with the number of killings by police increasing dramatically, as well as reports of multiple homicides at drug sale points by police vigilante groups.

By December, the wave of violence had subsided. By the end of 2012, 106 police officers had been killed throughout the year, with 775 civilians being killed as a result of police intervention, 84 of those by ROTA.

=== 2017 Paraguay heist ===
In April 2017 the company Prosegur located in Ciudad del Este, in the Triple Frontier of Brazil, Argentina and Paraguay, was robbed by a group of at least 30 men carrying heavy firepower. Early reports said 40 million dollars were stolen, although this was later revised to eight million. The group used automatic rifles, infrared sights, anti-aircraft guns, explosives, bullet-proof getaway cars, speedboats and blocked avenues with torched cars and trucks. Locals described the heist as "movie-like". Since the Modus operandi was similar to that of past robberies in Campinas, Ribeirão Preto and Santos in 2015 and 2016, the PCC was the main suspect for the heist, but this was never confirmed. It was the biggest robbery in the history of Paraguay. A police officer was killed and four people were injured.

=== 2023 foiled terror attacks ===
On 22 March 2023, the Federal Police (PF) launched Operation Sequaz, which sought to arrest 11 PCC members across four states (Mato Grosso do Sul, Rondônia, São Paulo and Paraná) who had planned to assassinate several Brazilian authorities, such as São Paulo state prosecutor Lincoln Gakiya, Vice President of Brazil and former Governor of São Paulo Geraldo Alckmin, Senator and former Lava Jato judge Sergio Moro, as well as his wife, Federal Deputy Rosangela Moro and retired Military Police Officer Coronel Telhada. At least 120 agents took part in the operation. As the Minister of Justice under the Bolsonaro administration, Moro had been responsible for the transfer of Marcola and 21 other senior PCC members from state to federal penitentiaries. Incumbent Minister of Justice Flávio Dino commemorated the operation, "sending his regards to the Federal Police for their important work". Brazilian President Lula da Silva questioned the operation, calling it "another one of Moro's setups".

With intelligence collected during Operation Sequaz, the PF also learned that the PCC had sent a three-man team to Brasília to plan for "a mission in the Federal District". Among the cellphones of the suspects that were seized during the operation, the Federal Police found pictures of residences belonging to Arthur Lira, President of the Chamber of Deputies and Rodrigo Pacheco, President of the Federal Senate. The suspected leader for Moro's planned assassination, Janerson Aparecido Mariano Gomes ("Nefo"), claimed that the PCC had created a division ("sintonia", or "syntony") responsible for high-secrecy and high-risk operations in 2014, called the Sintonia Restrita ("restricted syntony"). Sintonia Restrita members would be trained by the Paraguayan People's Army (EPP) and operate under direct orders from the PCC leadership, known as the Sintonia Geral Final ("general final syntony"), mainly in attacks against authorities, including politicians and members of the Judiciary.

The planned terror attacks sought to retaliate for the 2017 prohibition of intimate visits in federal penitentiaries, as well as Law 13,964/2019, proposed by Moro, dubbed the "anticrime package". Law 13,964 modified 14 laws and hardened the Brazilian prison system, making it harder for organized crime leaderships to issue orders from inside prisons. On 19 July, the Federal Police also found rock blasting explosives in a house belonging to PCC members in Curitiba, possibly planned to be used in an attack against Moro and his family. Another operation launched in 2024 by the Federal Police, known as Operation i-Fraud, exposed the use of AI tools which were allegedly used to spy on government authorities, such as Sergio Moro and Lincoln Gakiya, as well as members of the Judiciary, including those of the Supreme Federal Court.

== Statute ==
The Primeiro Comando da Capital has a statute with various rules for the criminal organization. Disobeying the rules, says the statute, carries a penalty of death. On May 16, 2006, a couple was arrested with a copy of the statute.

== Infighting ==
Since February 2024, it has been widely reported in the media that the Primeiro Comando da Capital is currently in a bloody infighting between the current top leader of the PCC, Marcos Willians Herbas Camacho (aka "Marcola") and five high-ranking leaders, Roberto Soriano (aka "Tiriça" or "Beto Tiriça"), Abel Pacheco de Andrade (aka "Vida Loka") and Wanderson Nilton de Paula Lima (aka "Andinho"), Daniel Vinicius Canônico (aka "Cego") and Valdeci Alves dos Santos (aka "Colorido"), since Vida Loka, Andinho, Cego and Colorido are on Tiriça's side in the bloody feud against Marcola.

The reasons that led to this bloody split within the First Command of the Capital are varied, but some of the most serious are:

- On 14 September, a dialogue was recorded between Marcola and agents inside the Federal Penitentiary of Porto Velho (RO) in which Marcola claims that Tiriça would be a “psychopath” (because Tiriça allegedly ordered the murder of 37-year-old criminal psychologist Melissa de Almeida Araújo in May 2017, in the city of Cascavel, in the state of Paraná) and which was used as evidence to sentence Tiriça to a more severe prison sentence, which led Tiriça's allies to accuse Marcola of being a traitor.
- Tiriça is very furious with Marcola for having ordered the murder of some of Tiriça's allies in recent years, such as Edilson Borges Nogueira (aka "Biroska"), Rogério Jeremias de Simone (aka "Gegê do Mangue") and Fabiano Alves de Souza (aka "Paca").
- In retaliation for the deaths of Gegê do Mangue and Paca, a hitmen team allegedly linked to Tiriça executed with rifle shots the mastermind behind the murders of the two, Wagner Ferreira da Silva (aka "Cabelo Duro") on February 22, 2018, in front of Blue Tree Towers Anália Franco, a luxury hotel located in the city of São Paulo. It is widely believed that Cabelo Duro was ordered to kill Gegê do Mangue and Paca by Gilberto Aparecido dos Santos (aka "Fuminho"), a close ally of Marcola.

As a consequence of the bloody internal conflict within the Primeiro Comando da Capital, two important allies of Marcola were murdered within weeks:

- Donizete Apolinário da Silva (aka "Prata"), 55 years old, was shot dead on February 25, 2024, in Mauá (a city in the Metropolitan Region of São Paulo) after returning from a baby shower. His pregnant 29-year-old wife and 10-year-old stepdaughter were injured in the shooting.
- Cristiano Lopes Costa (aka "Meia Folha"), 41 years old, was killed on March 12, 2024, while he was in a snack bar in Vicente de Carvalho, a district of the city of Guarujá, in Baixada Santista, São Paulo.

== Notable leaders and members ==
- Marco Willians Herbas Camacho, "Marcola" (Note: He sniffed glue at Praça da Sé as a teenager and his associates originally called him Marco da Cola and later Marcola.) (Incarcerated)
- Alejandro Juvenal Herbas Camacho Júnior, "Marcolinha" (Note: Marcola's younger brother.)/Little Marcola (Incarcerated)
- César Augusto Roriz Silva, "Cesinha" (Deceased) (Note: He was executed by the Primeiro Comando da Capital at the behest of Marcola himself in retaliation for the fact that Cesinha had ordered the murder of Marcola's former wife, Ana Maria Olivatto in October 2002.)
- Reinaldo Teixeira dos Santos, "Funchal" (Incarcerated)
- Júlio César Guedes de Moraes, "Carambola" (Incarcerated)
- Daniel Vinícius Canônico, "O Cego" (Incarcerated)
- Márcio Luciano Neves Soares, "Pezão" (Incarcerated)
- Alessandro Garcia de Jesus Rosa, "Pulft" (Incarcerated)
- Lourinaldo Gomes Flor, "Lori" (Incarcerated)
- Antônio José Muller Júnior, "Granada" (Incarcerated)
- Lucival de Jesus Feitoza, "Val do Bristol" (Incarcerated)
- Patric Velinton Salomão, "Forjado" (Incarcerated)
- Fernando Gonçalves dos Santos, "Colorido" (Incarcerated)
- Pedro Luiz da Silva Soares, "Chacal" (Incarcerated)
- Luiz Eduardo Marcondes Machado de Barros, "Dú da Bela Vista" (Incarcerated)
- Alexandre Cardozo da Silva, "Bradok" (Incarcerated)
- André Macedo Oliveira, "André do Rap" (Fugitive) (Note: According to the São Paulo Police and the Public Ministry of São Paulo, he may have fled to Baixada Santista (on the coast of São Paulo) or Paraguay.)
- Gilberto Aparecido dos Santos, "Fuminho" (Incarcerated)
- Idemir Carlos Ambrósio, a.k.a. "Sombra" (Deceased)
- Marcos Roberto de Almeida, "Tuta" (Fugitive) (Note: According to the Public Ministry of São Paulo, Tuta's last known whereabouts would be Bolivia, where he is supposedly currently hiding.)
- Rogério Jeremias de Simone, "Gegê do Mangue" (Deceased)
- Fabiano Alves de Souza, "Paca" (Deceased)
- Wagner Ferreira da Silva, "Cabelo Duro" (Deceased) (Note: Although the motive for his murder is still unknown, there is a suspicion by the Civil Police of São Paulo that he was killed in revenge for the murders of Gege do Mangue and Paca (the two PCC members mentioned above).)
- Marcio Vinicius da Paixão Vieira, "Pica-Pau" (Incarcerated) (Note: Leader of the PCC in Minas Gerais.)

== Designation as a terrorist group ==
In 2025, the Government of Argentina, led by Javier Milei, declared the Primeiro Comando da Capital (PCC) and Comando Vermelho (CV) as narcoterrorist organizations. In October 2025, the Minister of Security, Patricia Bullrich, announced that both groups had been included in the Registry of Persons and Entities Linked to Acts of Terrorism (RePET), which gathers groups and individuals considered a threat to national security. Due to the use of weapons of war and violent tactics that threaten public safety, the government of the State of Rio de Janeiro has sent a report to the United States government requesting that the criminal factions be classified as narco-terrorist organizations. Subsequently, Paraguay also designated them as such.

On 28 May 2026, United States Secretary of State Marco Rubio designated both groups as Specially Designated Global Terrorists (SDGTs) and, as of 5 June, Foreign Terrorist Organizations (FTOs).

== In popular culture ==
In the HBO series Pico da Neblina and in the Netflix series Sintonia, some characters have criminal activities based on PCC.

The Netflix series Irmandade is about a prison crime organization based on PCC.

== See also ==
- Crime in Brazil
- Drug trade in West Africa
- Illegal drug trade
