= 2006 São Paulo violence outbreak =

Clash between law enforcement officials and criminals in Brazil

May 2006 São Paulo violence
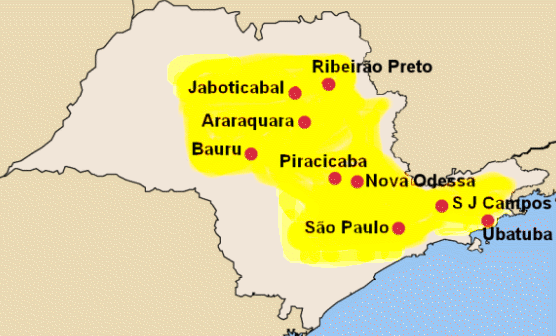
- Sites in São Paulo State attacked by PCC in 2006
| Date | 12–21 May 2006 (10 days) |
| Location | São Paulo (state) and other parts of the country |
| Result | On May 21, state government takes control of the situation. |

Belligerents
| Brazil; Brazilian Intelligence Agency; Brazilian Armed Forces; Brazilian Army; Brazilian Navy; Brazilian Marine Corps; Brazilian Air Force; Ministry of Justice; Brazilian Federal Police; Brazilian Federal Highway Police; São Paulo; Military Police of São Paulo State; ROTA; GATE; Civil Police of São Paulo State; GARRA/DEIC Divisão Anti Sequestro DAS/DEIC - Ronda Operacional "FÊNIX"; Municipal Guards | Primeiro Comando da Capital |

Commanders and leaders
| Cláudio Lembo; Col. Elizeu Eclair Teixeira Borges | Marcola |

Strength
| 50,000 Brazilian Armed Force; 100,000 police (military and civil) | unknown |

Casualties and losses
| 30 police dead 28 police wounded 3 municipal guards dead and 8 wounded. | 79 dead suspects |
- 21 civilian deaths

The 2006 São Paulo violence outbreak began on the night of May 12, 2006 in São Paulo, Brazil, the largest city in South America. It was among the worst outbreaks of violence in recorded Brazilian history and was directed against security forces and a few civilian targets. By May 14 the attacks had spread to other Brazilian states including Paraná, Mato Grosso do Sul, Minas Gerais and Bahia (this without direct links to the PCC criminal organisation).

The violence began after forty São Paulo police officers were killed by gang violence. Subsequently, the police officers sought to find the gang members behind the criminal acts. In the process, a violent situation arose, creating a clash between law enforcement officials and criminals and taking the lives of 564 people, and left another 110 injured.

The wave of violence, amongst the worst in Brazil's history, received broad national and international media coverage, and this fact allied to the lack of information from the São Paulo state government caused mass panic among the population. The state governor, Cláudio Lembo, was harshly criticized by the press for the slow response to the violence, for the absence of communication between the security forces, for the lack of information, to the press and the general public, and for poor management of the crisis.

== The violence ==
Casualties*
| Military Police | 23 dead / 22 wounded |
| State Civil Police | 7 dead / 6 wounded |
| Municipal Guards | 3 dead / 8 wounded |
| Prison Guards | 8 dead / 1 wounded |
| Prisoners | 17 dead |
| Civilians | 4 dead / 16 wounded |
| Criminals | 79 dead |
| Total | 141 dead / 53 wounded |
*as of 5/24/06

Since early Friday May 12, 2006 there were 299 attacks against public establishments such as police stations, justice forums, buses, etc.; which are allegedly organized by the Primeiro Comando da Capital (PCC) criminal organization.

The violence represented the bloodiest assault, worse than Rio de Janeiro, of its kind in the history of Brazil's richest state, São Paulo, and the news has reached the international media. Related uprisings at 20 prisons across São Paulo were taking place Saturday, May 13. The attacks were not limited, however, to the state of São Paulo, as they have reached other states, such as Bahia, Mato Grosso do Sul and Paraná.

The attacks came in response to 7 imprisoned PCC leaders, among them, Marcos "Marcola" Willians Herbas Camacho, the leader of the criminal organization who allegedly ordered the attacks, being transferred and placed in solitary confinement in the Presidente Venceslau penitentiary. The practice was used by authorities to sever prisoners' ties to gang members outside prison.

The power of the PCC has been heightened in recent years by the availability of mobile phones inside their jail cells. The lack of surveillance to prevent prisoners from communicating with criminals on the outside allowed them a powerful tool to spread information and coordinate uprisings and attacks in the state. Measures are being discussed, in the future, they might either remove mobile phone service antennas from the districts with penitentiaries, or increase the quality of surveillance inside jail cells, with metal detectors and other tools that would assist in locating cell phones.

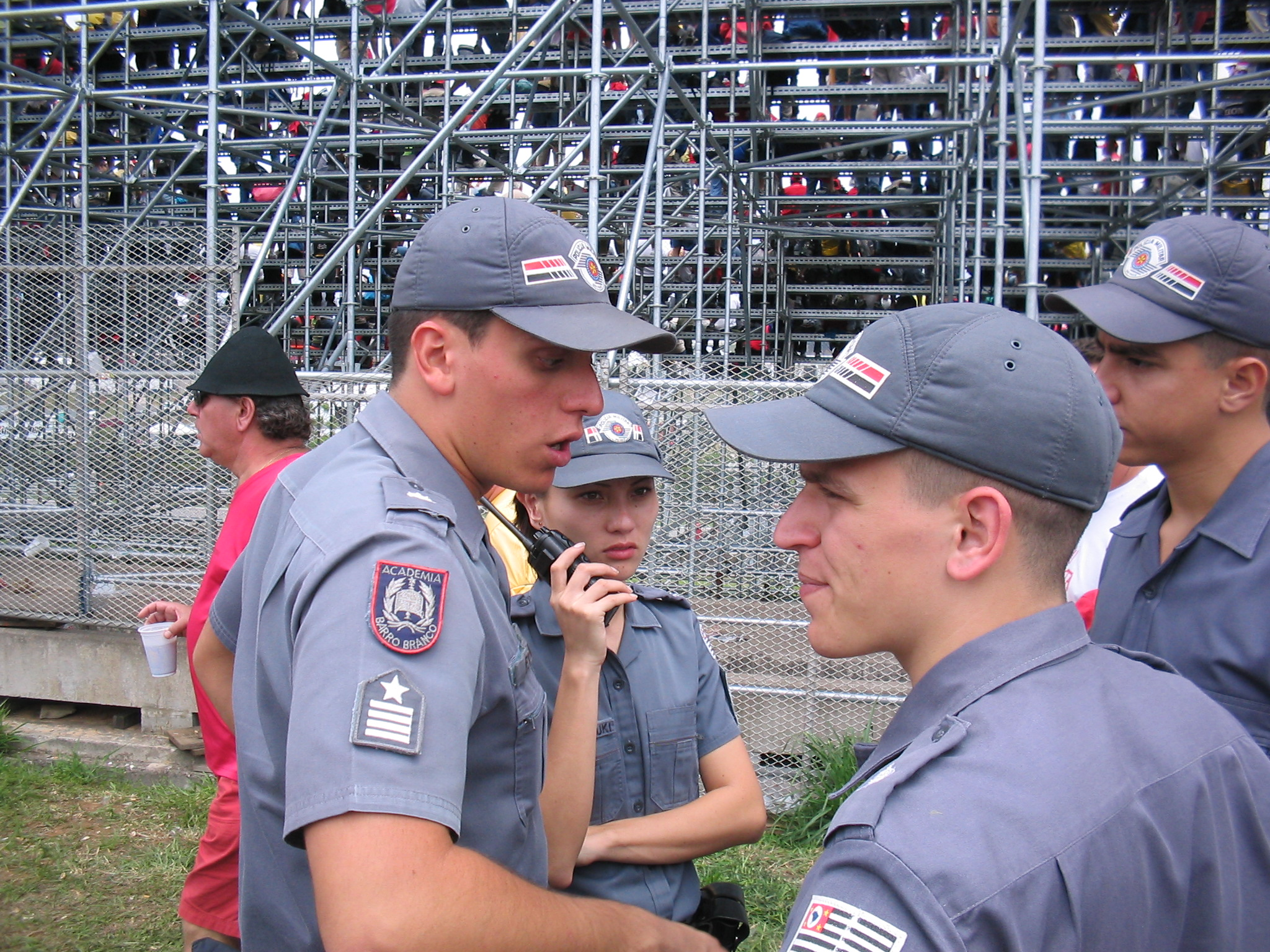
São Paulo's Military Police (Polícia Militar) is the main target of the attacks.

The waves of attacks were orchestrated by PCC leaders supposedly in jail, using said mobile phones, but it is arguable that the general chaos encouraged other criminals to take advantage of the situation.

The ministry of Justice, led by Márcio Thomaz Bastos, offered assistance by making available all federal security forces and the army, but São Paulo State Governor Cláudio Lembo said this is not necessary at the moment and that São Paulo can handle the situation without assistance.

May 15 was a very unusual day in São Paulo. This was the first work day after the attacks had been reported in the media, so the effects were now apparent as ever, with chaos marking the height of the attacks. On one hand, many people decided to stay home in fear of becoming a victim of violence. Also, one third of the public bus fleet stayed in the garages as they are a frequent target for attacks, being burned down and used to barricade streets and establishments. Consequently, the residential neighborhoods were ghost towns, whilst the avenues were choked with traffic because of the lack of public transportation. The compulsory carpool law was lifted for the day. Those who did go to work decided to go home early and the roads were congested long before peak hours. The ensuing traffic jams is the greatest of this year (195 km or 122 miles) and that fear was spread to the population mostly due to the massive coverage by the media, who may have exaggerated the situation. In addition, many rumors of attacks and riots are being created by civilians. The situation now is "under control."

== Timeline of the violence ==
=== Thursday, May 11 ===
- The intelligence service of the São Paulo police department managed to intercept phone calls between members of the PCC and became aware of plans for a major rebellion.
- As a response to such plans, the government announced the transfer of 765 members of the PCC to the high-security Presidente Venceslau Penitentiary, in order to dismantle the group's leadership.
- One of the PCC's leaders, Marcos Williams Herbas Camacho, nicknamed Marcola, asked for 60 televisions, so that he and other prisoners could follow the 2006 World Cup. The government ignored his request.

=== Friday, May 12 ===
- Marcola and other seven leaders of the PCC were taken to the headquarters of the Departamento Estadual de Investigações Criminais, São Paulo's criminal police, in order to be submitted for interrogation. Marcola refused to give any statements.
- Meanwhile, the PCC gave order to start rebellions in the entire state of São Paulo.
- At 8 PM, several attacks against police officers started; the 55th Police department was attacked by 15 cars and a police officer was killed near his house, in the eastern part of São Paulo.
- Four civil police officers, a prison guard, four civil guard members and a military serviceman were killed in addition to nine people injured in 19 actions before midnight.

=== Saturday, May 13 ===
- By the morning, the situation had escalated to a major rebellion in several prisons across the state. In the total, 24,472 prisoners in 24 prisons rebelled, taking 129 hostages. The police arrested 17 suspects of being involved in the violence.
- In a meeting with police officials, the state governor, Cláudio Lembo was informed of the scale of the rebellion. He decided to mobilize all available police officers in an attempt to quell the violence.
- In a press conference, Cláudio Lembo and Saulo Abreu, the Secretary for Public Safety, called the PCC's reaction to the transfer of prisoners "predictable".
- At the end of the day, the number of attacks had escalated to 69, 44 of them in the metropolitan area of São Paulo. 32 people had been killed, among them, 22 police officers, 5 prison guards, 1 civilian and 4 criminals. At the time, hundreds of hostages were still being held in several prisons.

=== Sunday, May 14 ===
- On May 14, the police reacted aggressively. Fifteen criminals were killed in 33 actions that were carried out until 8 PM. The number of imprisoned criminals climbed to 70.
- During the day, 47 more jails of the state of São Paulo received the order to start rebellions. Mutinies started in 71 of the 105 jails in the state.
- In the evening several buses were set on fire, mainly on the southern and eastern areas of the city. Following these attacks, several banks were robbed.
- At the end of the night, criminals attacked two depots of the traffic police with molotov cocktails.

=== July 14–17 ===
The city suffered new attacks and riots by the PCC two months later.

== See also ==
- Primeiro Comando da Capital
