= José William Vesentini =

Brazilian human geographer (born 1950)

- Born: Missing required parameter 1=month! , 1950; Presidente Bernardes, São Paulo, Brazil
- Education: Universidade de São Paulo
- Occupations: Geographer and professor

José William Vesentini (born in 1950 in Presidente Bernardes) is a Brazilian human geographer. He teaches geography and areas of political geography and geopolitics, and is regarded as a pioneer of critical geography.

== Life ==
Vesentini's grandparents were Italian anarchists who came to Brazil to escape fascism. He taught in the first and second grades for over ten years during the 1970s and participated in special educational programs such as a supplementary course in the Metalworkers Union of São Bernardo do Campo and Diadema (1974-1976), and the Centre for Educational Guidance (COE) (1973-1977), a private high school transformed into a cooperative run by teachers.

In 1984 he became a professor and researcher in the Department of Geography at the Faculty of Philosophy, Literature and Human Sciences at University of São Paulo (FFLCH). His work Brazil: Society and Space, published in 1984, was the first textbook to adopt the approach of critical geography.

Within academia, Vesentini is better known as William Vesentini; he has been livre-docente at the department since 2003. He has written over 30 books on geography and geopolitics.
