= Sebastián Marset =

Uruguayan drug lord (born 1991)

- Born: Sebastián Enrique Marset Cabrera; 10 April 1991 (age 35); Montevideo, Uruguay
- Other names: Luis Paulo Amorim Santos, Gabriel de Souza Beumer
- Occupations: drug trafficker, businessman, former footballer
- Spouse: Gianina García Troche
- Children: 4
- Convictions: Bolivia and Paraguay: drug trafficking; United States: money laundering

Sebastián Enrique Marset Cabrera (born 10 April 1991) is a former Uruguayan drug lord accused by authorities in several countries of leading an international cocaine trafficking and money laundering network known as the Primer Cartel Uruguayo (PCU). Considered one of the most wanted criminals in the Southern Cone for years, he was believed to have had links to groups such as the Insfrán Clan of Paraguay, the Primeiro Comando da Capital (PCC) of Brazil, and the Italian 'Ndrangheta. He was captured on 13 March 2026, in Santa Cruz de la Sierra, Bolivia, during a major police operation and immediately extradited to the United States by DEA agents to face federal charges.

== Early life ==
Marset was born in Montevideo and grew up in the Piedras Blancas neighborhood. His first links to drug trafficking date back to 2012, when he received an air shipment of hundreds of kilograms of marijuana from Paraguay, sent by Juan Domingo Viveros Cartes, uncle of former Paraguayan President Horacio Cartes. In 2013, he was arrested in Uruguay for another drug shipment, confessed his involvement, and was convicted. He served his sentence at the Libertad Penitentiary until his release in 2018. During his incarceration, he established key contacts with members of the Brazilian PCC and other transnational networks.

== Rise and international expansion ==
After his release from prison, Marset settled in Paraguay, where he created shell companies such as Total Cars to launder money. Between 2018 and 2022, he consolidated the PCU, a logistical structure that coordinated massive shipments of cocaine from Bolivia and Paraguay to European ports (mainly Belgium, the Netherlands, and Portugal). The network handled tons per operation and generated tens of millions of dollars.

He used multiple false identities and passports from different countries. In 2021, he was arrested in Dubai with a fake Paraguayan passport. While in detention, he applied for and obtained a Uruguayan passport issued in accordance with the regulations in force at the time. The episode triggered a political scandal in Uruguay, which led to the resignations of several high-ranking officials and the subsequent modification of the regulations that had allowed the procedure.

He maintained a public facade: he registered as a footballer for Deportivo Capiatá (Paraguay) and Leones de El Torno (Bolivia), where he managed the club, and presented himself as a music entrepreneur and event promoter.

== Accusations and connections ==
Marset is accused of being the mastermind behind the murder of Paraguayan prosecutor Marcelo Pecci, which occurred on 10 May 2022, in Cartagena, Colombia, during his honeymoon. He was implicated in Operation A Ultranza PY (Paraguay, 2022), which dismantled part of his network and linked the PCU to seizures of more than 16 tons of cocaine in Europe. In May 2025, the U.S. Department of Justice indicted him for conspiracy to launder money through the U.S. financial system. The DEA listed him among its most wanted fugitives, and the State Department offered a reward of up to US$2 million.

== Fugitive and failed operations ==
In 2022, Marset began hiding primarily in Santa Cruz de la Sierra, Bolivia, living in a mansion in the El Urubó area with his wife, Gianina García Troche, and their children. In July 2023, a Bolivian raid seized weapons, luxury vehicles, and exotic animals, but Marset escaped. His wife was arrested in Spain in 2024 and extradited to Paraguay for money laundering. In July 2025, close Marset associated Federico Ezequiel Santoro Vassallo would sentenced to 15 years in prison by a U.S. court after pleading guilty to money laundering.

== Capture and extradition to the United States ==
On 13 March 2026, in a major operation by the Special Force for the Fight Against Drug Trafficking (FELCN) and the Bolivian UTOP in the Las Palmas neighborhood of Santa Cruz, Marset was captured along with four other people (two Venezuelans, a Colombian, and a relative named Tatiana Marset Alba). The operation, coordinated with international intelligence and the DEA, began in the early morning without incident. Hours later, he departed Bolivia by DEA plane and began his extradition to the United States (with a stopover in Lima, Peru) to face charges of money laundering and drug trafficking. Bolivian President Rodrigo Paz described the arrest as a "historic event" and a "turning point" in the fight against organized crime. On 14 March 2026, DEA Administrator Terrance Cole confirmed the arrest of Marset, but noted that it was actually "today" when "DEA agents escorted Marset to the United States."

On March 16, 2026, Marset would make his first court appearance since being handed over to American authorities at a federal district court in Virginia. The same day, Bolivians announced the seizure of some $15 million in assets belonging to Marset, including 16 planes, five houses and firearms.

== See also ==
- Arrest of Roger Mariaca
