= Crime in Brazil =

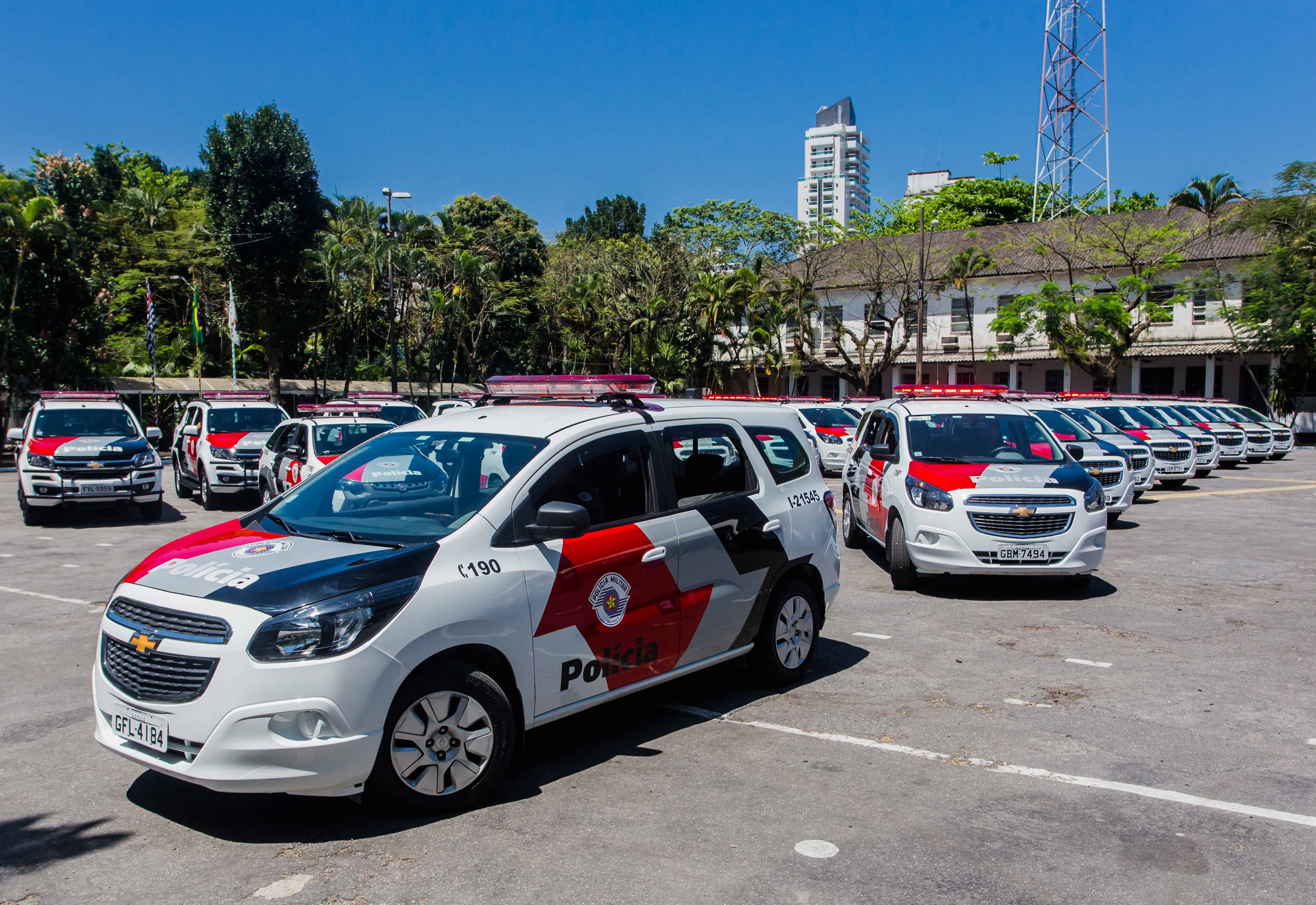
- Police cars of the Military Police of São Paulo State in 2017
- Homicide: 18.7 (2024)
- Assault: 106.1 (2023)
- Burglary: 97.9 (2024)
- Theft: 1045.1 (2024)
- Fraud: 728.7 (2024)
- Corruption: 1.2 (2024)
- Bribery: 0.6 (2024)
- Money laundering: 0.3 (2024)
- Rape: 38.6 (2023)
- reported annually per 100,000 inhabitants

Crime is a persistent issue that affects the population either directly or indirectly in Brazil. The country has above-average global levels of violent crime, with particularly high rates of gun violence and homicides. According to the United Nations Office on Drugs and Crime (UNODC), Brazil had an intentional homicide rate of 19.28 per 100,000 inhabitants in 2023, down from 20.08 in 2022 and 31.16 in 2017.

In 2025, Brazil recorded 34,086 homicides, down from 38,374 homicides reported in 2024. This decline continues a trend that began in 2020, with a 25% reduction in homicides since then. The homicide rate in Brazil for 2025 was 16 per 100,000 inhabitants, the lowest in over a decade.

== Homicides ==
1 million homicides were reported in Brazil between 1980 and 2010, attributable to rising inequality, more young men in the population, greater availability of firearms and increased drug use. In 1980, the homicide rate was 11.4 per 100,000 population, which more than doubled to 28.4 in 2002. In 2021, Brazil had a murder rate of 21.26 per 100,000 inhabitants, which was lower than in 2017. Another study had the 2017 murder rate at 32.4 per 100,000, with 64,357 homicides. In 2016, Brazil had a record of 61,819 murders (an average of 168 murders per day), giving a yearly homicide rate of 29.9 per 100,000 population. In 2019, the anti-violence organization Rio de Paz stated that only 8% of homicides in Brazil lead to criminal convictions.

=== By Brazilian states ===
List of the Brazilian state capitals by homicide rate (homicides per 100,000):

Capital/Region	1997	1998	1999	2000	2001	2002	2003	2004	2005	2006	2007	% change
Northern (state capitals)	31.9	39.5	31.3	34.2	32.1	34.2	34.4	31.8	35.6	34.9	33.0	▲ +3.7
Belém (PA)	24.5	29.1	15.1	25.9	27.0	31.8	34.7	29.6	44.7	33.9	34.2	▲ +39.7
Boa Vista (RR)	34.6	51.5	51.4	40.4	32.1	38.2	33.0	21.5	23.1	220	25.7	▼ −25.8
Macapá (AP)	46.6	51.0	64.1	46.2	44.3	44.0	44.1	38.5	38.0	35.8	32.3	▼ −30.8
Manaus (AM)	35.3	40.7	35.3	33.0	25.2	26.5	29.3	26.2	29.4	32.3	32.5	▼ −7.8
Palmas (TO)	70.0	12.7	19.7	21.8	26.5	20.5	21.5	21.3	13.0	13.6	12.8	▼ −82.5
Porto Velho (RO)	38.3	70.3	55.5	61.0	66.9	63.2	51.1	71.4	56.4	68.5	51.3	▲ +33.8
Rio Branco (AC)	36.6	38.4	17.0	36.4	39.0	44.8	37.9	30.9	23.9	36.3	30.1	▼ −17.8
Northeast (state capitals)	40.8	33.6	30.2	34.0	39.5	39.4	41.7	40.8	44.8	49.6	52.4	▲ +28.5
Aracaju (SE)	19.3	16.8	35.2	39.9	60.9	54.4	50.6	47.2	40.5	46.7	38.9	▲ +101.2
Fortaleza (CE)	27.0	20.3	25.2	28.2	27.9	31.8	29.5	28.5	34.0	35.0	40.3	▲ +49.5
João Pessoa (PB)	33.3	38.4	36.0	37.8	41.3	42.5	44.7	42.6	48.1	48.7	56.6	▲ +70.3
Maceió (AL)	38.4	33.3	30.9	45.1	59.3	61.3	61.2	64.5	68.6	98.0	97.4	▲ +153.5
Natal (RN)	18.1	16.2	9.6	10.4	15.6	13.9	23.0	13.2	18.5	20.5	28.3	▲ +56.4
Recife (PE)	105.3	114.0	99.3	97.5	97.2	90.5	91.4	91.8	88.2	90.7	87.5	▼ −16.9
Salvador (BA)	41.6	15.4	7.9	12.9	21.3	23.2	28.6	28.5	39.7	43.7	49.3	▲ +18.3
São Luís (MA)	22.2	16.5	12.8	16.6	27.4	21.4	30.8	32.6	30.0	31.4	38.4	▲ +73.1
Teresina (PI)	16.9	17.6	14.0	22.2	23.2	27.8	28.5	26.0	29.4	33.5	28.2	▲ +66.9
Southeast (state capitals)	56.0	58.0	59.8	58.9	58.0	55.0	54.5	47.5	36.5	34.5	27.8	▼ −50.3
Belo Horizonte (MG)	20.7	25.0	26.8	34.8	35.0	42.9	57.6	64.7	54.4	49.9	49.5	▲ +139.7
Rio de Janeiro (RJ)	65.8	62.6	53.5	56.6	55.5	62.8	56.1	52.8	41.9	46.4	35.7	▼ −45.8
São Paulo (SP)	56.7	61.1	69.1	64.8	63.5	52.6	52.4	39.8	28.3	23.2	17.4	▼ −69.4
Vitória (ES)	103.5	106.6	108.3	79.0	85.1	80.2	73.0	82.7	83.9	86.1	75.4	▼ −27.1
Southern (state capitals)	29.5	25.1	27.3	29.9	30.3	34.8	35.5	39.3	40.4	40.3	43.3	▲ +46.4
Curitiba (PR)	26.6	22.7	25.9	26.2	28.0	32.2	36.6	40.8	44.3	48.9	45.5	▲ +70.7
Florianópolis (SC)	9.4	9.3	8.9	10.2	17.0	24.7	27.1	28.9	24.4	19.4	19.5	▲ +106
Porto Alegre (RS)	37.2	31.4	32.9	39.2	36.5	40.5	36.4	40.3	40.1	35.5	47.3	▲ +27.3
Central-West (state capitals)	35.3	37.7	37.6	39.2	39.1	37.4	39.3	36.8	33.4	33.4	34.1	▼ −3.2
Brasília (DF)	35.6	37.4	36.7	37.5	36.9	34.7	39.1	36.5	31.9	32.3	33.5	▼ −5.9
Campo Grande (MS)	41.9	36.4	30.8	39.3	34.0	34.5	35.3	30.7	28.5	27.1	32.2	▼ −23.2
Cuiabá (MT)	55.3	76.0	68.5	69.5	76.9	52.0	49.8	45.5	44.4	40.7	38.8	▼ −29.9
Goiânia (GO)	22.1	22.6	30.1	28.6	29.4	38.1	37.4	37.4	34.6	36.4	34.6	▲ +56.6
Brazil (state capitals)	45.7	45.3	44.6	45.8	46.5	45.5	46.1	42.4	38.5	38.7	36.6	▼ −19.8

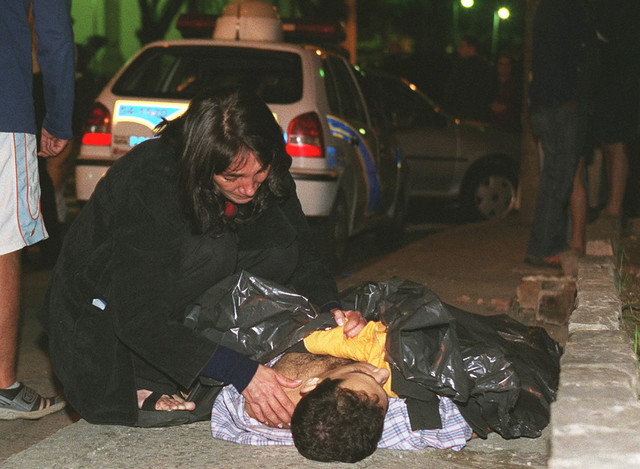
Murdered journalist in Rio de Janeiro in 2004

Murders increased nationwide during the late-2000s; on the other hand, the two largest cities saw a decrease of murders. In 2008, Rio de Janeiro registered the lowest murder rate in 18 years, while the murder rate in São Paulo fell to 10 per 100,000 from a rate of 35.7 per 100,000 a decade earlier. A notable example is the municipality of Diadema, where crime rates fell abruptly.

Total murders set new records in the three years from 2009 to 2011, surpassing the previous record set in 2003. Police records post significantly lower numbers than the health ministry.

7 out of the 20 most violent cities in the world are in Brazil, due to a rise in street violence. As of April 2018, the cities with highest homicide rates worldwide (in descending order) are Natal (4th highest), Fortaleza (7th highest), Belém (10th highest), Vitória da Conquista (11th highest), Maceió (14th highest), Aracaju (18th highest), and Feira de Santana (19th highest).

== Robbery ==
Carjacking is common, particularly in major cities. Local citizens and visitors alike are often targeted by criminals, especially during public festivals such as the Carnaval. Pickpocketing and bag snatching are also common. Thieves operate in outdoor markets, in hotels, and on public transport.

A trending crime known as arrastões ('dragnets') occur when many perpetrators act together, simultaneously mug pedestrians, sunbathers, shopping mall patrons, and/or vehicle occupants stuck in traffic. Arrastões and random robberies may occur during big events, football games, or during peak beach hours.

== Kidnapping ==
Express kidnappings, where people are abducted while withdrawing funds from ATMs, are common in major cities including Rio de Janeiro, São Paulo, Brasília, Curitiba, Porto Alegre, Salvador, and Recife.

== Corruption ==
Corruption in Brazil is a pervasive social problem. Brazil scored 38 on the 2016 Corruption Perceptions Index, tying with India and Bosnia and Herzegovina, being ranked 76th among 175 countries. Corruption was cited among many issues that provoked the 2013 protests in Brazil. Embezzlement and corruption have influenced Brazilian elections for decades; however, the electorate continues to vote, whether out of preference or lack of choice, for candidates who have been accused, and in some instances convicted, on charges of corruption.

== Domestic violence ==
Between 10 and 15 women are murdered each day in Brazil. A government sponsored study found that 41,532 women were murdered in Brazil between 1997 and 2007. In 2012, only 8% of all homicide victims were female.

== Crime dynamics ==
=== Prevention and drug war ===
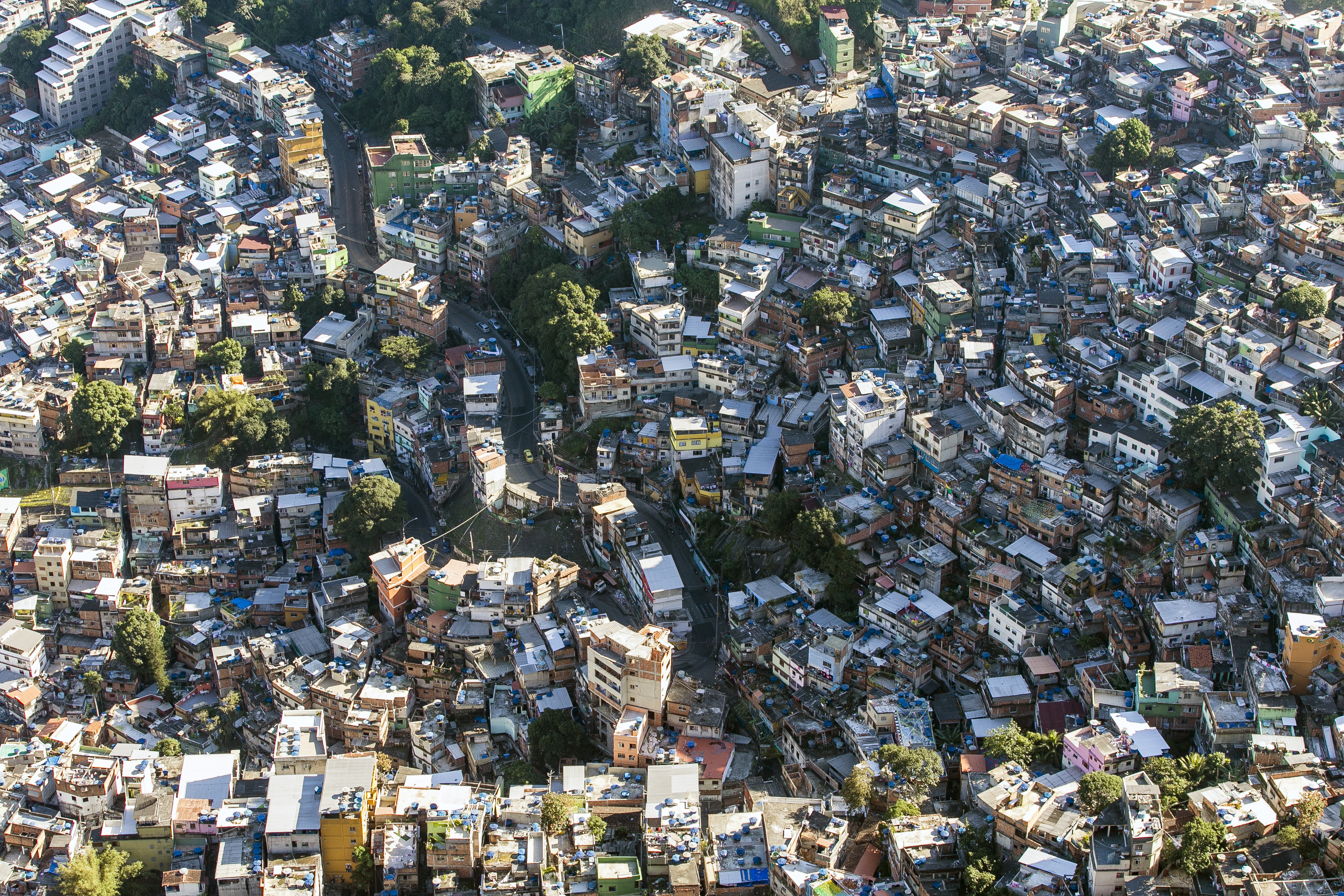
An overhead view of Rocinha, Rio de Janeiro, 2014

A program to combat gangs and gang-centered violence known as the Pacifying Police Unit (PPU) was introduced in the traditionally violent favelas of Rio de Janeiro in 2008 and 2009. PPU personnel are well-educated and trained in both human rights and modern police techniques; their aim is to supplant the community presence of gangs as central community figures. In 2013, 34 PPU units operated in 226 different communities, with a reach of 1.5 million citizens.

The PPU program symbolizes a new crime prevention paradigm that focuses on social inclusion and community development. However, in some areas the homicide rate was already dropping prior to the implementation of the program. Therefore, the drop in crime may be due to a general trend of decline in homicides as well.

According to data by the Public Security Institute (Portuguese: Instituto de Segurança Pública), between 2007 and 2013, the violent death rate in areas with PPUs dropped by 80% – a more pronounced reduction than in the rest of the municipality, which also experienced a drop in these indices over the period. The homicide rate caused by opposition to police intervention was the indicator of violence that showed the most significant reduction, of almost 90%, but also decreased other crimes against life and property.

In 2014, however, the violent lethality indicators rose again not only in the PPU areas, but in the entire municipality. Rio had not seen so many violent deaths since 2009, the first year of the PPU. Today the numbers are practically the same as in the pre-PPU period.

In the latest survey by the Cândido Mendes University Center for Security and Citizenship Studies (Cesec), carried out in 2014 with PPU officers, researchers had already found a complete abandonment of the "proximity" approach and the return to repressive policing. According to them, the "lack of command, control and logistics" is the cause of all the problems in the Pacifying Police Units, including the death of police officers in the communities.

As of 2015, Pacifying Police Units of Rio de Janeiro are no longer useful, according to specialists. After more than ten years of design, they are now beginning to undergo drastic changes, since police officers from different units also began to patrol the streets, in addition to the usual policing. The lack of formalization of the program and the establishment of evaluation indicators was also a problem, say the researchers. The PPUs have never had an internal and systematic evaluation.

The movement was expanded "hastily", in an "unbridled" way. Between 2010 and 2013, the number of PPUs almost tripled, jumping from 13 to 36. The exaggerated expansion also ended up overloading the Military Police, an institution that, according to a former Military Police Colonel, already needed (and still needs) structural reforms. "The solution is beyond the police. It seems a cliché, but the social part has been missing since the beginning of the project", evaluated the former Commander of the Military Police between 2007 and 2008.

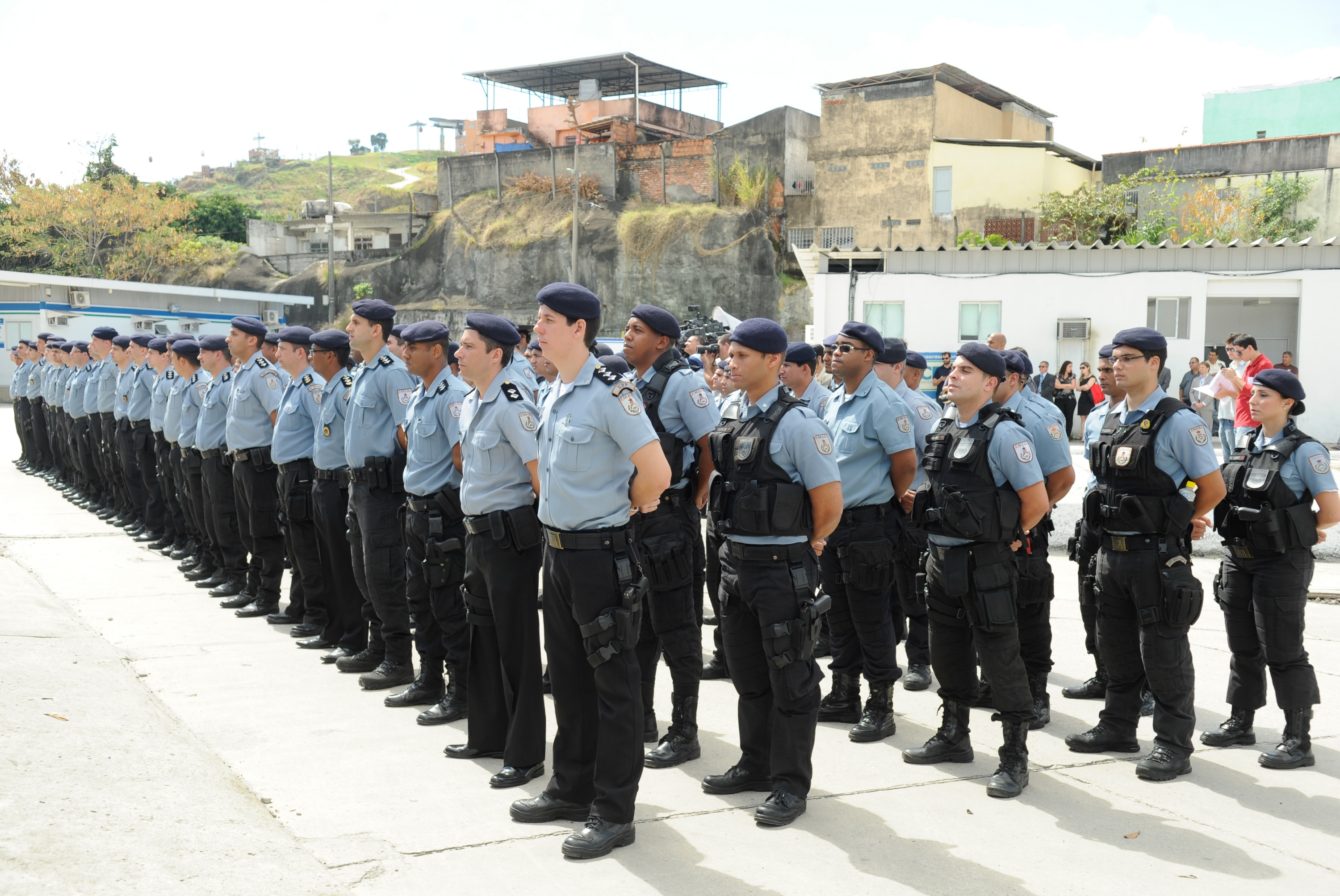
Change of Command Ceremony of 25 UPP Units, 2013

In the 7 years of the project, there were several allegations of corruption and abuse of force involving PPU soldiers. The most remembered among them is the torture and death of the bricklayer Amarildo de Souza.

The proposal, however, proved to be flawed due to the inexperience of these new military police officers with no apparent condition to work in former faction strongholds, as was the case in Rocinha and Complexo do Alemão. Burning containers, lack of restrooms and armor, accumulated garbage, broken air conditioning was just one of the proofs that the military police were not working under ideal conditions. And on at least eight bases the PMs would be working in an extreme situation. Former ISP Director Ana Paula Miranda also believes that "during all this time, an idea was made that the problems in Rio de Janeiro were over", "That was the first mistake. Excessive advertising not taking into account the flaws throughout the project".

Since the first PPU arrived, in the Santa Marta community, in Botafogo, in 2008, the reality of the residents has changed not only in relation to the actions of armed groups. Everything got more expensive: the electricity bill started to arrive and there was no way to practice these "thefts" in electricity. By 2015, the favela that had once a "model" PPU unit, saw the number of homicides spike, alongside the drug war.

In the past, the State of Rio de Janeiro had already carried out a similar attempt at occupation, and for the same reasons, in Ana Paula's opinion, the project did not succeed and, it seems, the lesson was not learned. "The strategy is very similar. There was a lack of perception that these problems would all happen later".

In April 2017, at Complexo do Alemão, a 19.6-foot-high (6.0 m) armored tower was installed, resistant to rifles and grenade explosions, to house PPU police from the Nova Brasília community.

As of May 2021, a new project was released by the then Governor Cláudio Castro and documents obtained by the media in September showed the discussion of the project for at least 2 months. Called Cidade Integrada (Integrated City), the new program for the occupation of communities by the Government of Rio de Janeiro, in a model of public security and urban and social interventions. It is not yet clear, however, how the police will act in this new project.

Jacarezinho, where there is strong influence from drug trafficking, and Muzema, controlled by the militia, are expected to be the first to receive the program, with its launch scheduled for late November or early December.

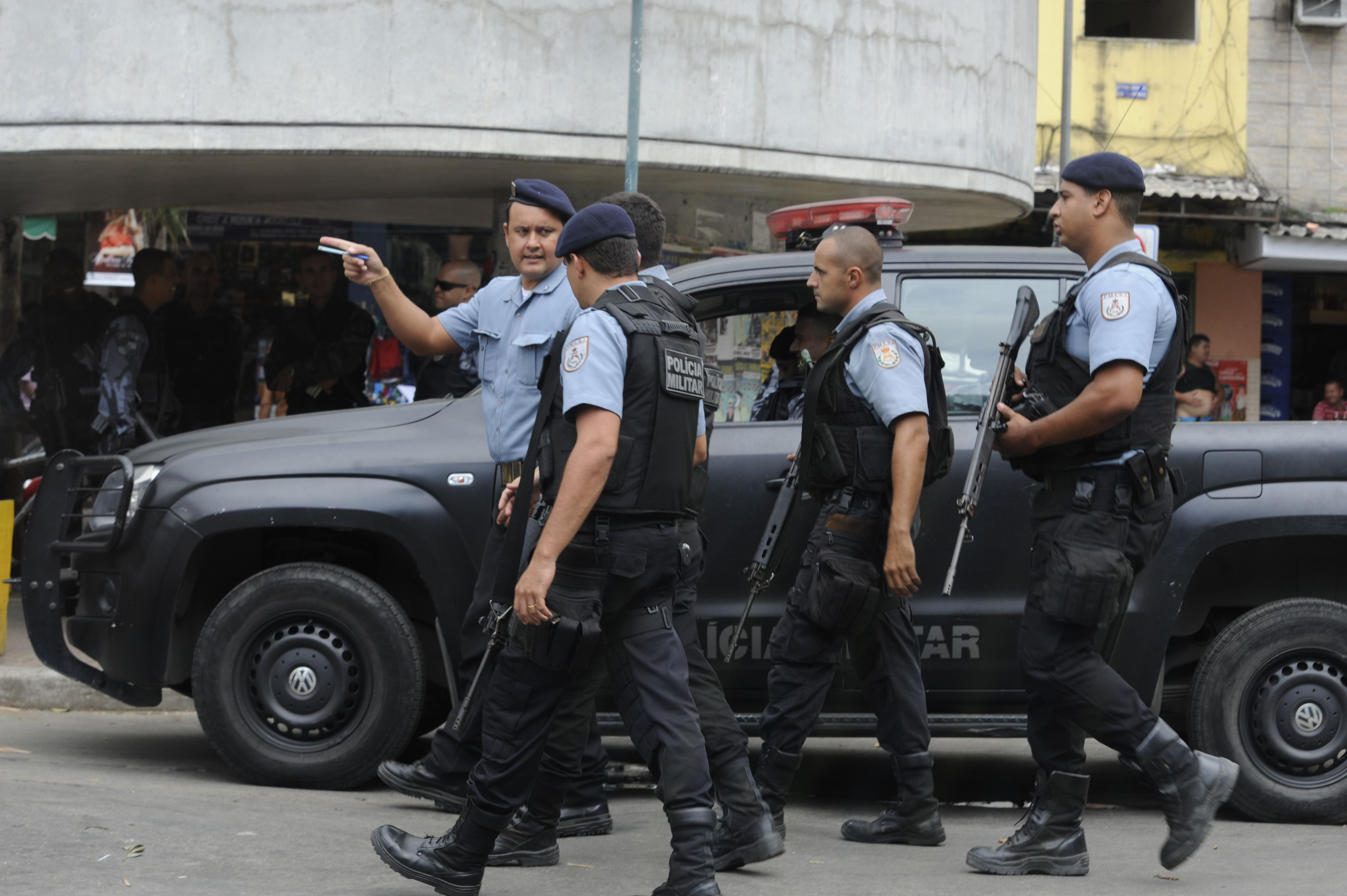
Police officers in the favela of Rocinha

=== Gangs ===
Gang violence has been directed at police, security officials and related facilities. Gangs have also attacked official buildings and set alight public buses. May 2006 São Paulo violence began on the night of 12 May 2006 in São Paulo. It was the worst outbreak of violence recorded in Brazilian history and was directed against security forces and some civilian targets. By 14 May, the attacks had spread to other Brazilian states including Paraná, Mato Grosso do Sul, Minas Gerais and Bahia. Another outbreak of violence took place in São Paulo in July 2006.

2016 saw a new string of deadly prison riots. The nature of these riots was a turf war between the Primeiro Comando da Capital and other gangs, with the PCC aggressively expanding its territory. In 2019, a prison riot between two gangs, Comando Vermelho and Comando Classe A, left 57 dead after hours of fighting.

Brazilian gang members have used children to commit crimes because their prison sentences are shorter. As of 2007, murder was the most common cause of death among youth in Brazil, with 40% of all murder victims aged between 15 and 25 years old.

In regard to inter-gang conflict, gangs typically challenge or demand an aggressive reaction to defend their reputations. If someone does not respond in this manner, they are socially isolated. The gangs in Brazil are very territorial and are focused on their illegal business. Theft and robbery bring in small amounts of money compared to narcotic and weapons sales; thus, it is less common for these gangs to get involved in petty crimes of theft or robbery.

The gangs in Rio de Janeiro are interested in harmony because they do not want any contact with the police. They will help others in the community with money and even protection, just to be sure that the police do not come around. Children and other members of the community see gang members and want to emulate this behavior. Gang members then become a substitute for family and are role models because they have respect and money.

It is most common for these gangs to be under a military command structure. Each Rio favela has one dono who controls the managers of a favela and the soldados in his territory. The latter protect the favela against other drug factions and the police. They are also responsible for taking over other favelas. The managers of a favela control the managers of the bocas (the places where drugs are sold in the favela). The managers of the bocas in turn control the drug dealers who sell the drugs in the area around a boca. There are children and women who wait at the entrances to a favela to signal to the others if the police or other gangs are about to enter. It is normal to join at about 10 years old, and by 12 years old to carry weapons. These gangs are attractive to the children and youth because they offer protection, recognition, and career options that those who join could not achieve on their own. Favelas are now often controlled by juveniles and young adults.

The concern here is of the strong ties that are between illegal business and politicians, police officers, the justice system, and the economy. Not all people are involved but all layers of society are affected because of corruption. Police are bribed to not disturb what these gangs are doing, and many of them are dealers themselves. Also, young children carry guns and may be nervous, aware of peer pressure, or on drugs, and can become careless. Brutality and homicide rates have skyrocketed in countries with younger gang members like this.

=== Drug trafficking ===
Drug trafficking makes up for an increasingly large portion of crime in Brazil. A total of 27% of all incarcerations in Brazil are the result of drug trafficking charges. Between 2007 and 2012, the number of drug related incarcerations has increased from 60,000 to 134,000—a 123% increase.

The primary drug trafficking jobs for children and the youth are:

- endoladores – drug packaging
- olheiro(a) and/or fogueteiro(a) – being a lookout for police or members of enemy gang
- Drug mule – carrying drugs inside their body, usually unwillingly
- vapor – drug salespersons
- gerente da boca – overseeing drug sales
- soldado(a) ('soldier') – maintaining protection while armed
- fiel – armed guards for the gerente geral
- gerente geral or dono – being the owner, leader or boss
- Aviões ('little airplanes') – delivering messages and drugs to customers. They are not described in the hierarchal organization, but they are very low/entry-level positions. In addition, those in this position have the most arrests.

Of the 325 incarcerated youth, 44% of males and 53% of females reported some involvement with drug trafficking. Selling and carrying drugs were the most common activities between both boys and girls. The most common drug was marijuana, followed by cocaine and crack cocaine. According to the study, 74% had used marijuana, 36% had snorted cocaine, and 21% had used crack.

The youth held low positions in the hierarchy and engaged in relatively low volumes of activity for short periods of time; however, 51% of the youth involved in trafficking reported it to be very easy to obtain a gun, while 58% involved in trafficking reported it to be very easy to obtain cocaine.

On 6 May 2021, at least 25 people were killed in a shootout between police and a drug-dealing gang.

=== Penalties ===
Criminal penalties for youths, responsible for a significant portion of street crime, usually involve internment in educational centers, with a maximum stay of three years. Youths are not punished under the penal code, but under the Brazilian Statute of the Child and Adolescent.

For adults, the consumption of drugs is nearly decriminalized, but activities in any way related to the sale of drugs are illegal. The distinction between drug consumers and suppliers is poorly defined and thus controversial. This ambiguity gives judges a high degree of discretion in sentencing, and leads to accusations of discriminatory or unequal court rulings. Drug consumers receive light penalties varying from mandatory self-education on the effects of drugs to community service. The minimum sentence for a drug supplying offense is 5 to 15 years in prison. Critics of the consumer/supplier distinction between offenses argue for a more complex categorization than only two categories, to allow for more lenient punishments for minor drugs violations. Former UN secretary general Kofi Annan and former president of Brazil Cardoso argue for stepping away from the "war" approach on drugs, saying the militant approach can be counterproductive. However, many others hold a hard-line preference for heavy penalization.

== See also ==
- Brazilian police militias
- Caixa 2
- Law enforcement in Brazil
- Social apartheid in Brazil
- Terrorism in Brazil
- List of assassinated Brazilian politicians
