= Pyrolytic coating =

Thin film coating applied to glass

Pyrolytic coating is a thin film coating applied at high temperatures and sprayed onto the glass surface during the float glass process.

== Advantages ==
- Relatively durable coating.
- Can be tempered after coating application.
- Can be used in single glazing applications.

== Applications ==
Pyrolytic coating can be used as a protective or decorative coating on equipment parts, energy-insulator on window glasses, anti-friction agent in moulding applications.

== See also ==
- Pyrolytic chromium carbide coating
