= Printed Circuit Corporation =

American circuit board manufacturer

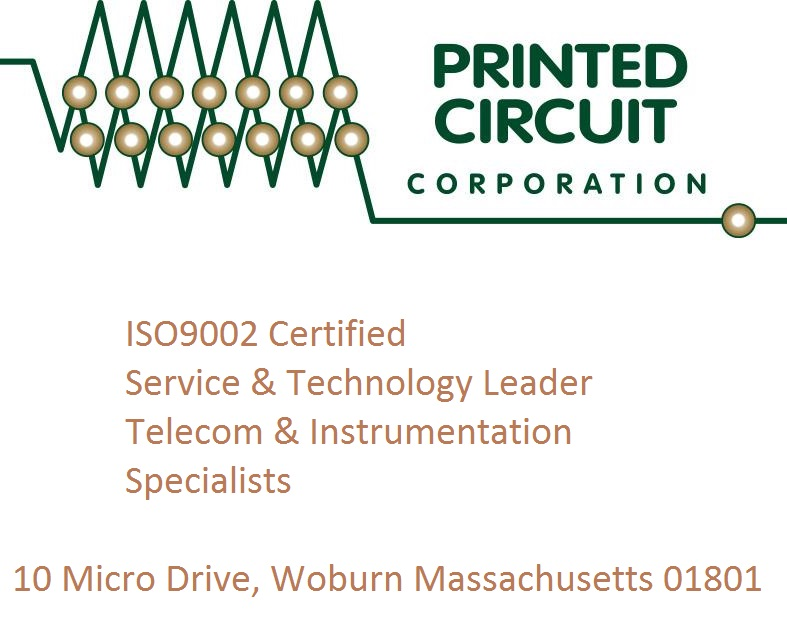
- Founded: 1961
- Founder: Peter Sarmanian (d. July 11, 2001)
- Headquarters: Woburn, Massachusetts, United States

Printed Circuit Corporation (PCC) was founded in 1961 and was a contract printed circuit board manufacturer located in Woburn, Massachusetts. (SIC Code 3672). PCC provided its products to companies in the electronics, instrumentation, medical, telecommunications, and automotive industries. The majority of the boards produced were multilayer (4, 6, 8, or 10-layer).

In 1995, the environmental advances made by the firm were highlighted in a joint study by The Massachusetts Toxics Use Reduction Institute in conjunction with the University of Massachusetts Lowell.

In 2001, PCC was featured on an ABC-TV business news show called Business Now. The show featured the technology that the company used and the management disciplines that allowed it to compete effectively in the world PWB market.

Peter Sarmanian was the founder and CEO of Printed Circuit Corporation. Sarmanian's contributions to the PWB industry as a whole have been recognized by the IPC on an annual basis.

== Company history ==
Peter Sarmanian started Printed Circuit Corporation in 1961 during the early days of the computer industry. Sarmanian was pursuing an undergraduate technical degree at Northeastern University after having returned from service in the Korean War. His first significant production contracts were to manufacture printed circuit boards for the technology innovators of the 1960s – early minicomputer companies like RCA Computer Systems, Digital Equipment Corporation, and Data General Corporation.

Sarmanian was a pioneer in the electro-chemical production of printed circuit boards. The new process offered far greater reliability for the printed circuit boards and far higher density (chips and circuitry per square inch) for packaging components.

When Sarmanian launched the company, most computer and electronics manufacturers were fabricating their own boards. Independent suppliers, however, became increasingly efficient and were proving a more cost-effective solution for a broad range of printed circuit board applications. Likewise, computer and electronics manufacturers became more comfortable using suppliers for key electronic components, including printed circuit boards. Reductions in time to market, engineering/prototyping costs, and manufacturing ramp-up costs were being demonstrated by these suppliers to win business. In 1979, 40% of all rigid printed circuit board fabrication was being outsourced to suppliers like PCC. By 1989, that figure was about 60%, and by 1995, 80%. By 2001, 98% of all printed circuit board production was going to external suppliers. Industry analysts placed total bookings for printed circuit board production worldwide at approximately $30 billion in 2000, with the US market comprising about a third of that dollar volume.

Sarmanian built a profitable company with approximately $30 million a year in revenue at its peak in 2000, and a 100,000-square-foot (9,300 m^{2}) fabrication plant on Route 128 outside of Boston. At the time, he had 240 employees working two full shifts a day, and sometimes, another half shift for limited production of new prototype boards.

Sarmanian died in July 2001 following a bout with cancer. The company filed for reorganization shortly thereafter, then was acquired by Manchester, NH–based fabricator Electropac in October 2002.

== Printed Circuit Corporation's business approach ==
PCC had traditionally operated in the mid-range segment, providing boards to New England–based minicomputer companies. Sarmanian bought state-of-the-art equipment to keep pace with the industry, but he always did it as a follower. At the beginning of the 1980s, Sarmanian saw that volumes in the low-end were beginning to explode and decided to diversify. By 1995, only 50% of PCC's revenues came from its traditional mid-range customers; the other 50% came from low-end consumer electronics manufacturers. By 1995 his company was a $20 million a year business. However, this low-end high-volume strategy got the company into financial trouble when the market for video game cartridges for the Atari and Intellivision systems collapsed.

By the early 1980s, offshore manufacturers had started low complexity, high volume fabrication. By the end of the decade, they dominated it. In this semi-automated, high volume process, the offshore producers were able to quote substantially lower prices due to cheap labor. By 1995, the consumer electronics manufacturers had moved virtually all their business to Asian fabricators. Because of this foray into the low-end, by 1995 PCC's profits had declined 90%. New management was brought in during 1996 and 1997 to help turn the company around.

New management shed the unprofitable low-end business to refocus on the mid- range, more technologically complex segment of the market. These changes were made in time to capture some explosive growth. Historically, the PCB market had grown about 6% a year, but from 1995 to 2000 it grew at 10%. By 2000, the company's sales had increased to $30 million. Laser drilling, better solder masking for finishing printed circuitry, and semi-automated systems for electrical testing of finished boards were the major improvements needed to get to industry parity.

PCC named Glen Kashgegian president and COO in 2000.

In June 2001, Printed Circuit Corp. acquired the circuit board fabrication business of CPC in Randolph, MA.

== The End of PCC ==
Amid the tech recession of 2001 to 2003, the company failed to adjust as customers migrated to lower cost products from China, and filed for reorganization in September 2002. The company then was acquired by Manchester, NH–based fabricator Electropac in October 2002. Ultimately, as the North American Printed Circuit market continued to shrink and consolidate, Electropac closed their business and sold certain assets to another competitor, located in Nashua NH, named Mass Design.

== Environmental Battles ==
In 1990, the company was fined $407,835 for allegedly violating state sewer regulations 60 times over two years and ignoring orders to stop. The penalty was the third-largest in the history of the Massachusetts Water Resources Authority at the time.
