= Personal Car Communicator =

Volvo car security technology

A Personal Car Communicator (PCC) is a system of protection in a key fob developed by Volvo.

The Personal Car Communicator was first introduced by the company in the S80 sedan for the 2007 model year. The personal car communicator uses a two-way radio communicator, allowing the vehicle owner to check such security items as the locking status of the vehicle. Most notable is the ability of a heartbeat monitor that checks if someone is left inside the car.

To use the Personal Car Communicator, one must press the "i" button on the fob. If close to the vehicle, it will most likely give feedback within a minute of pressing. If further away, it may take up to 5-10 minutes.

When the "i" button is pressed, it can tell one the status of their vehicle. If a solid green light appears, that means the vehicle is locked. If a solid yellow light appears, that means the vehicle is unlocked. If a solid red light appears, that means the vehicle's alarm has been triggered since the last time the car was locked. If two flashing red lights appear, that means the alarm has been triggered in the last 5 minutes. In some cases, if it is flashing, the heartbeat monitor may have detected something.
