= Marcelo Pecci =

Paraguayan prosecutor (1976–2022)

Marcelo Daniel Pecci Albertini (28 September 1976 – 10 May 2022) was a Paraguayan prosecutor. He prosecuted many high-profile criminal cases, involving Paraguayan and international drug cartels, as well as celebrities, including a 2020 case when Brazilian association football player Ronaldinho attempted to illegally enter Paraguay.

== Personal life ==
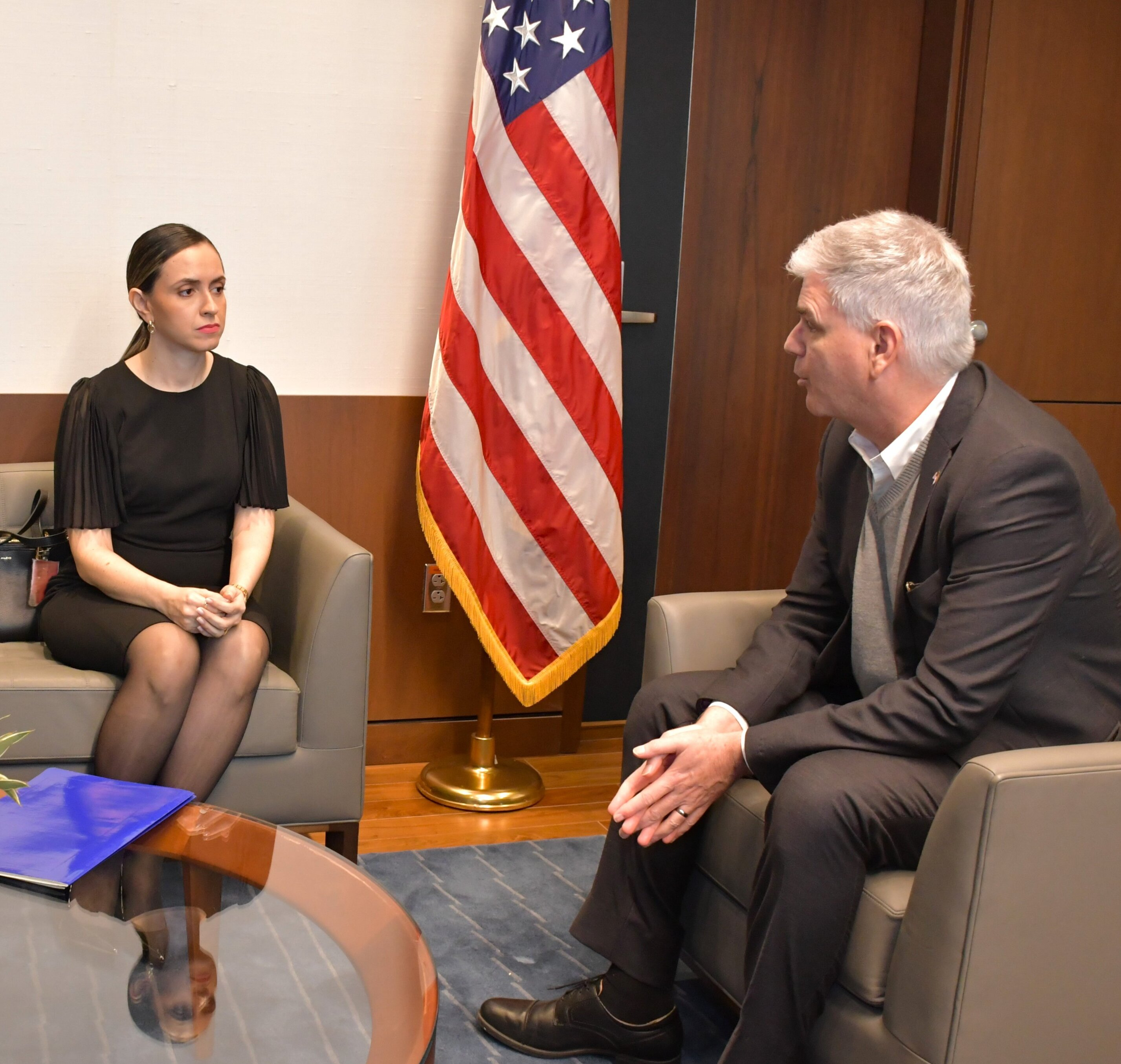
Pecci's widow, Claudia Aguilera, with U.S. Ambassador to Paraguay Marc Ostfield in May 2024

On 30 April 2022, Pecci married Paraguayan journalist Claudia Aguilera Quintana. On the day of his death, she had told him that she was pregnant. Their son, Marcelo Daniel was born on September 30, 2022 four months after Pecci's murder.

== Death ==
Pecci and his wife Claudia were honeymooning in Baru, a tourist island off Cartagena, Colombia, when they were approached by two men on 10 May 2022. The two men shot Pecci three times, once in the face and killing him instantly. Pecci was interred in the Recoleta Cemetery, Asuncion.

The judiciary requested the lifting of the parliamentary immunity of MP Erico Galeano, of the Colorado Party, because of his links with the criminal organisation responsible for the murder of the judge.

=== Reactions ===
Many prominent people reacted publicly to Pecci's death, including President of Paraguay Mario Abdo Benitez, who said on Twitter that "the cowardly murder of prosecutor Marcelo Pecci in Colombia (puts) all the Paraguayan nation in mourning. In the most energetic terms, we condemn this tragic event and reinforce our compromise of battle against organized crime. Our most sincere condolences (go) to his family members."
