= Pyrolytic chromium carbide coating =

Pyrolytic chromium carbide coating (PCC) is a technology for protection and reworking of rapidly wearing parts of manufacturing equipment working in extreme environmental conditions, using vacuum deposition technology. Coating mechanical parts can help with problems of corrosion, adhering, high-temperature and mechanical wear thus reducing unplanned repairs and loss of production.

The features of PCC coatings are:

- obtaining protective layers with high adhesion strength on parts and products made of various engineering materials including metal and non-metal materials withstanding deposition conditions (up to 500 °C, 0.1 Pa);
- applying coatings on internal and external surfaces of longs shafts, complex-geometry parts with dead holes, grooves and channels, providing uniform thickness and composition;
- coating finished surfaces with no through porosity at small thickness (3–5 micrometres)
- PCC coating process runs in vacuum at 450 to 500 °C.

== Fields of application ==
Protection of instruments and machinery parts surface exposed to simultaneous impact of corrosion, erosion, sealing, pickup, high temperature, abrasive and mechanical wear.
