= Presidente Bernardes, São Paulo =

Municipality in the state of São Paulo in Brazil

Presidente Bernardes
- Municipality
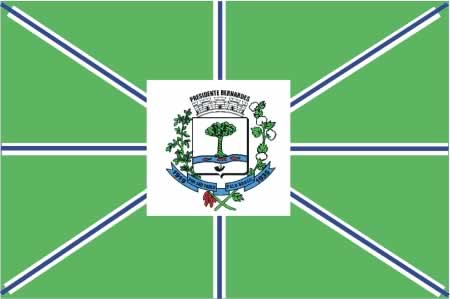
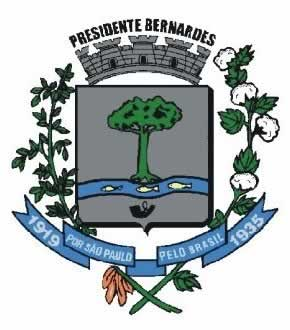
- Flag Coat of arms

- Location in São Paulo state

- Location in Brazil
- Coordinates: 22°0′22″S 51°33′11″W
- Country: Brazil
- Region: Southeast
- State: São Paulo
- Named for: Artur Bernardes

Area
  - Total: 749 km^{2} (289 sq mi)

Population (2020)
  - Total: 13,023
  - Density: 17.4/km^{2} (45.0/sq mi)
- Time zone: UTC−3 (BRT)

Presidente Bernardes is a municipality in the state of São Paulo in Brazil. The town was named after former president Artur Bernardes. The population is 13,023 (2020 est.) in an area of 749 km^{2}. The elevation is 429m.

== Demographics ==
Historical population (municipality)
Year	Population	%±
1940	22,687	—
1950	28,046	23.6%
1960	31,069	10.8%
1970	25,590	−17.6%
1980	15,784	−38.3%
1991	16,311	3.3%
2000	14,662	−10.1%
2010	13,570	−7.4%
2022	14,490	6.8%

== Media ==
In telecommunications, the city was served by Telecomunicações de São Paulo. In July 1998, this company was acquired by Telefónica, which adopted the Vivo brand in 2012. The company is currently an operator of cell phones, fixed lines, internet (fiber optics/4G) and television (satellite and cable).

== Religion ==
Christianity is present in the city as follows:

=== Catholic Church ===
The Catholic church in the municipality is part of the Roman Catholic Diocese of Presidente Prudente.

=== Protestant Church ===
The most diverse evangelical beliefs are present in the city, mainly Pentecostal, including the Assemblies of God in Brazil (the largest evangelical church in the country), Christian Congregation in Brazil, among others. These denominations are growing more and more throughout Brazil.

== See also ==
- List of municipalities in São Paulo
