= Presidente Venceslau =

- Municipality
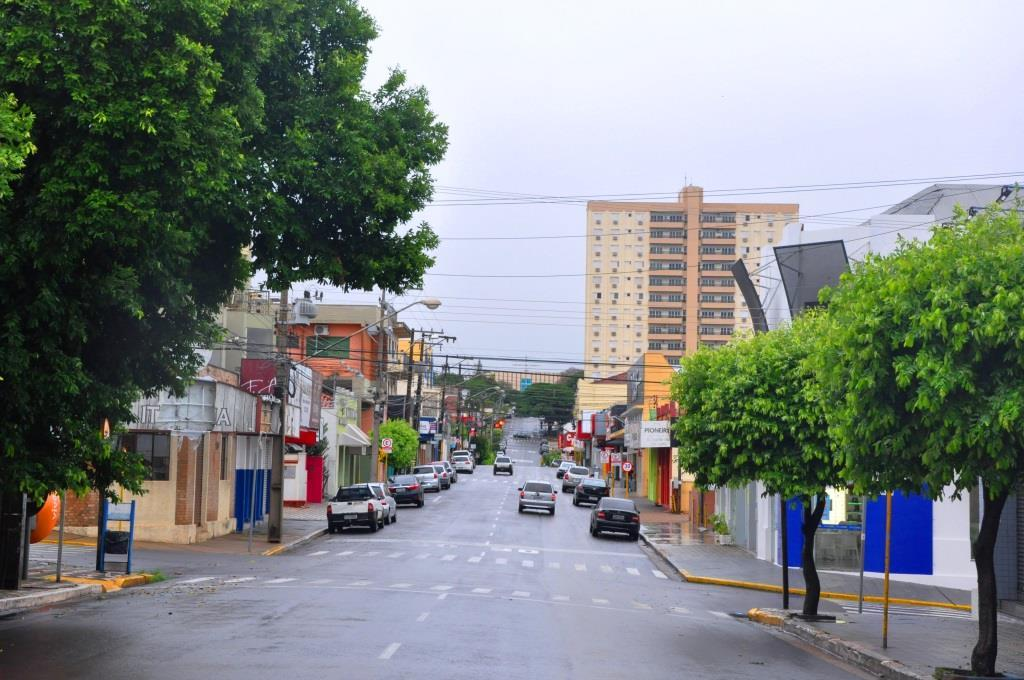
- View of Presidente Venceslau

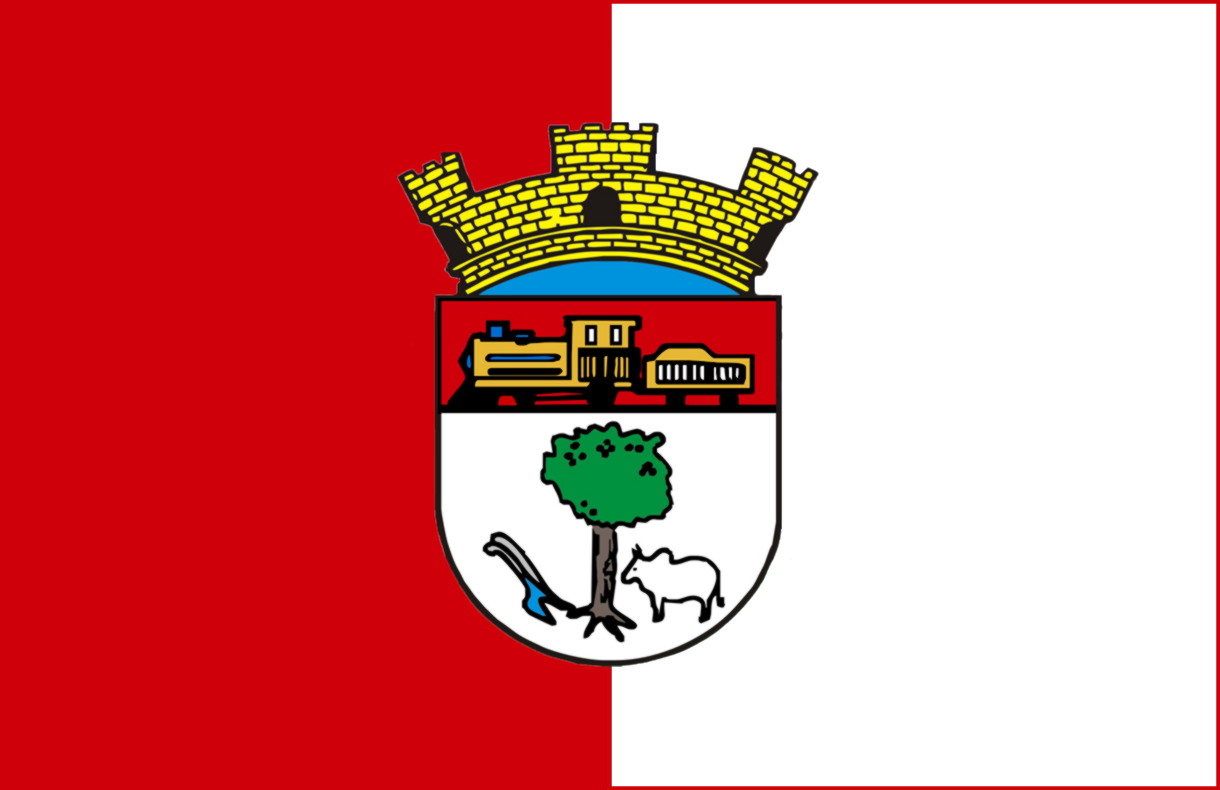
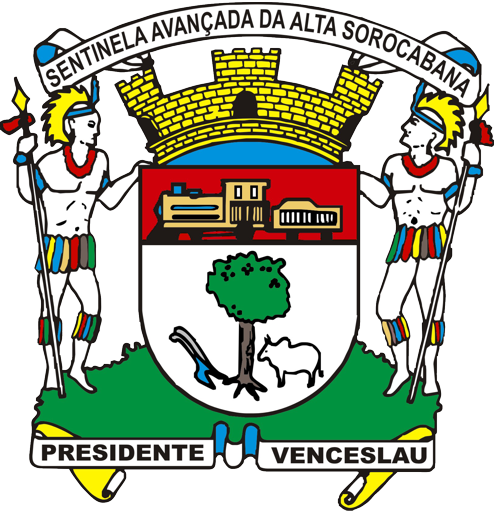
- Flag Coat of arms

- Location in São Paulo state

- Location in Brazil
- Coordinates: 21°52′34″S 51°50′38″W
- Country: Brazil
- Region: Southeast
- State: São Paulo

Area
  - Total: 755 km^{2} (292 sq mi)

Population (2020)
  - Total: 39,583
  - Density: 52.4/km^{2} (136/sq mi)
- Time zone: UTC−3 (BRT)

Presidente Venceslau is a municipality in the state of São Paulo in Brazil. The population is 39,583 (2020 est.) in an area of 755 km^{2}. The elevation is 422 m. The municipality was named after Venceslau Brás, former president of Brazil.

== Geography ==
The municipality contains part of the 7,720 hectares (19,100 acres) Rio do Peixe State Park, created in 2002.

== Demographics ==
Historical population (municipality)
Year	Population	%±
1940	23,168	—
1950	30,506	31.7%
1960	21,551	−29.4%
1970	25,976	20.5%
1980	30,160	16.1%
1991	36,120	19.8%
2000	37,347	3.4%
2010	37,910	1.5%
2022	35,201	−7.1%

== Media ==
In telecommunications, the city was served by Telecomunicações de São Paulo. In July 1998, this company was acquired by Telefónica, which adopted the Vivo brand in 2012. The company is currently an operator of cell phones, fixed lines, internet (fiber optics/4G) and television (satellite and cable).

== Religion ==
Christianity is present in the city as follows:

=== Catholic Church ===
The Catholic church in the municipality is part of the Roman Catholic Diocese of Presidente Prudente.

=== Protestant Church ===
The most diverse evangelical beliefs are present in the city, mainly Pentecostal, including the Assemblies of God in Brazil (the largest evangelical church in the country), Christian Congregation in Brazil, among others. These denominations are growing more and more throughout Brazil.

== See also ==
- List of municipalities in São Paulo
