= Carandiru =

Carandiru may refer to:

- Carandiru (film), 2003 Brazilian film
  - Estação Carandiru, the 1999 novel the above film is based on
- Carandiru (São Paulo Metro), station on Line 1 (Blue) of the São Paulo Metro
- Carandiru Penitentiary, former prison in São Paulo, Brazil
  - Carandiru massacre, a 1992 slaying of 111 prisoners by military police

== See also ==
- Candiru (disambiguation)
