= Carandiru massacre =

1992 military police killing of prisoners in Brazil

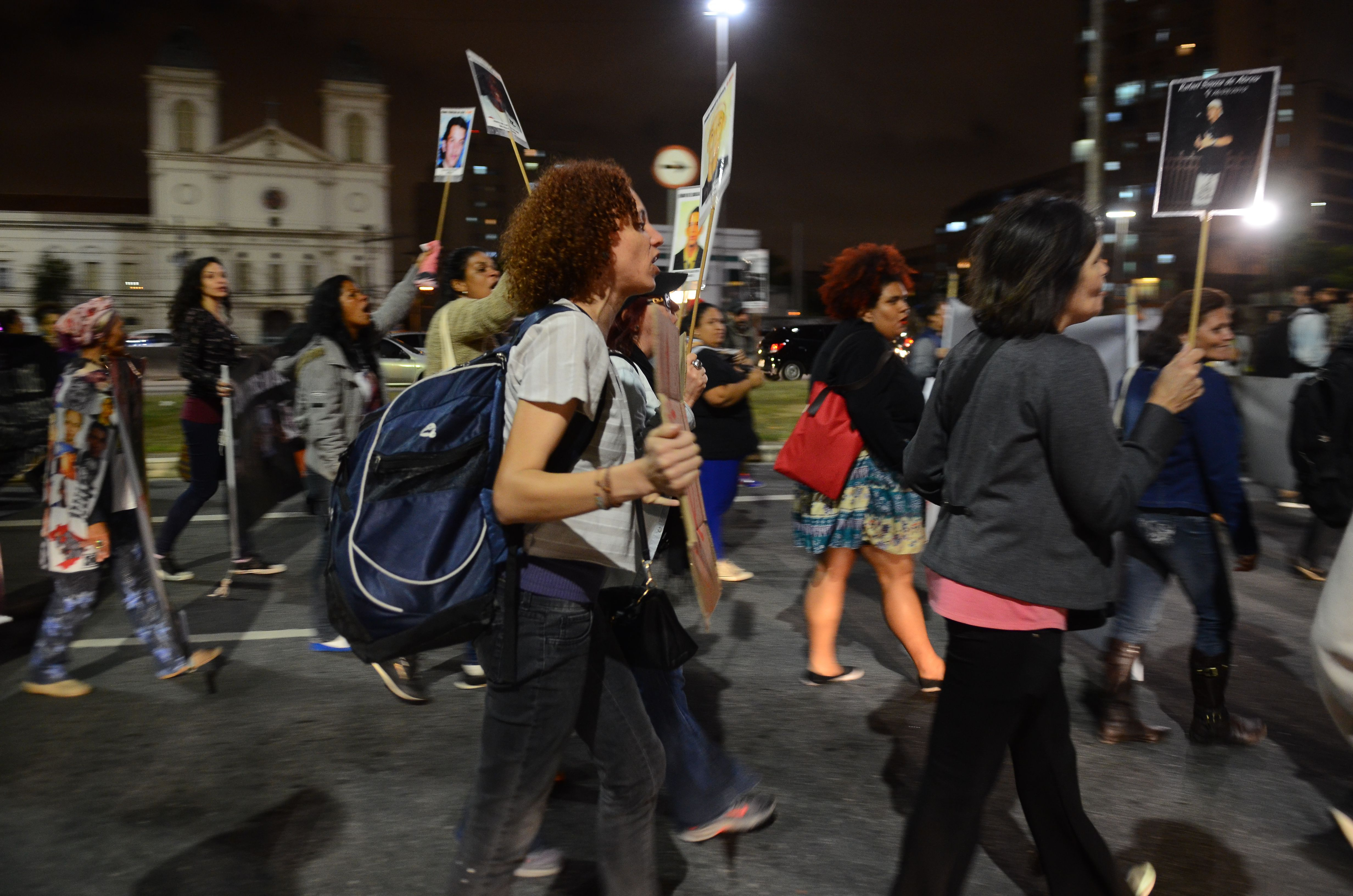
- Act in memoriam of 111 prisoners dead in the incident
- Location: Carandiru Penitentiary, São Paulo, Brazil
- Date: 2 October 1992; 34 years ago
- Deaths: 111
- Injuries: 37
- Victim: Prisoners
- Perpetrator: São Paulo State Military Police
- Motive: Prison riot

The Carandiru massacre (Portuguese: Massacre do Carandiru, pronounced [maˈsakɾi du kaɾɐ̃dʒiˈɾu]) occurred on 2 October 1992, in Carandiru Penitentiary in São Paulo, Brazil, when São Paulo's military police stormed the penitentiary following a prison riot. The massacre, which left 111 prisoners dead, is considered by many people to be a major human rights violation.

== Incident ==
The incident was started by a prisoner revolt. At around 13:30 BRT (16:30 GMT), prison director José Ismael Pedrosa was warned that a fight had started between two groups in cell block 9 after a game of football. The groups were led by the inmates Luiz Tavares de Azevedo, known as "Coelho" ("Rabbit"), and Antonio Luiz Nascimento, known as "Barba" ("Beard"). The fight then escalated into a prison riot that lasted three hours. Prisoners were reportedly attacking each other with knives and pipes. The conflict consisted of 2,069 prisoners against 15 guards, resulting in the guards quickly losing control of the prisoners.

Around 14:15 BRT (17:15 GMT), prison director Pedrosa informed the local military police about the uprising. Colonel Ubiratan Guimarães of the PMESP mobilized the riot police battalions, and after a phone call with the Secretary of Public Security, Pedro Franco de Campos, gave the order for an incursion of 341 policemen into the prison complex. The prison director attempted to negotiate with the prisoners using a megaphone, but was pushed aside by the storming military police forces.

The deaths took place in the first four floors of cell block 9. In the first two floors, an incursion by ROTA policemen led to 15 deaths in the first floor and 78 deaths in the second floor. In the third floor, a COE incursion led to 8 deaths, and in the fourth, a GATE incursion led to 10 deaths.

ROTA officers who took part in the 2nd floor massacre supposedly defended their actions by stating that riot police units were unable to advance due to rebellious inmates allegedly using firearms and attempting to infect the policemen with HIV using bodily fluids. In a 2013 testimony, former ROTA Colonel Valter Alves Mendonça described coming across a decapitated body, having fired his weapon after feeling hits to his ballistic shield, and that prisoners armed with blades got into hand-to-hand combat with his unit. He also described ROTA as a "priesthood" by the end of his testimony.

Many of the inmates had not yet been tried or convicted. By the end of the day, 111 prisoners were dead; and 37 more were injured. A 2022 Deutsche Welle article states that 3,500 bullets were fired within the span of 20 minutes, whilst a 1993 Amnesty report states that of some 5,000 bullets that were fired, 515 were found in dead prisoners' bodies. Bodies were found with hands behind their heads, suggesting defensive positions. No policemen were injured.

== Aftermath ==
The country was in major shock from the massacre. The case was brought before the inter-American Commission by The Center for Justice and International Law (CEJIL), the Teotônio Vilela Commission for Human Rights, and Human Rights Watch, and in 2000, eight years after the massacre, they condemned Brazil for it. In 2013, hundreds of people attended a multi-faith vigil in São Paulo in memoriam of those killed in the massacre. Relatives of those killed and human rights activists have both demanded and appealed for justice. The vigil and pleas for justice led to several trials for the officers involved in the massacre that same year. In 2001, the commanding officer of the operation, Colonel Ubiratan Guimarães, was initially sentenced to 632 years in prison for his mishandling of the rebellion and the subsequent massacre, but was allowed to serve his sentence in liberty. In 2002, he was elected a state deputy for São Paulo as a member of the Brazilian Labour Party with more than 50,000 votes, running with the campaign number 14.111 in reference to the 111 deaths. He acquired privileged forum as a result of his election. On 16 February 2006, a Brazilian court voided Guimarães' conviction because of mistrial claims; the court accepted his argument that he was only "following orders". He was murdered in September 2006, found dead in his apartment after being shot in the abdomen. Although not entirely certain, his death was likely the result of his role in the massacre.

Another direct result of the riot and the handling of the riot was the unification of prisoners. One of Brazil's most notorious gangs, the Primeiro Comando da Capital (PCC), is said to have formed in 1993 as a response to the event. The surviving gang members joined forces with other prisoners to provide protection against the police. The group is believed to be responsible for the death of José Ismael Pedrosa, the director of the prison at the time.

After years of national and international pressure, the prison was demolished on 8 December 2002, the former complex having been turned into a park. The massacre also gained international attention, with The New York Times, publishing one article titled "111 Killed When Police Storm Brazilian Prison During Inmate Riot" the same year as the massacre. The massacre also received attention from the BBC with several articles in the last several years dealing with the vigils and the trials. The massacre has also sparked ongoing discussions, both in Brazil and internationally about Brazil's prison system. In 2017, The New York Times published an article captioned "Brazil’s Deadly Prison System". Human rights groups such as Human Rights Watch have also documented statistics of police violence and acquittals in Brazil.

== Trial ==
In April 2013, 23 policemen involved in the massacre were sentenced to 156 years in prison each for the killing of 13 inmates. In August 2013, another 25 policemen involved in the massacre were sentenced to 624 years each for the deaths of 52 inmates. In April 2014, 15 additional policemen were sentenced to 48 years. Although the UN urged Brazil to bring justice to those most affected by the slaughter in September 2016, the court declared the trial on Carandiru massacre null. The court judged that the massacre was an act of self-defense and that there was a lack of evidence to link the individual officers to the individual killings. Consequently, the prosecutor is initiating an appeal and the process remains ongoing. None of the officers convicted have served their sentences. Since the massacre, Brazil's federal government has passed new legislation to reform the prison system, all of which have, as of 2017, yet to be enforced.

== In popular culture ==
=== Music ===
- The massacre is the subject of the song "Manifest" by Brazilian heavy metal band Sepultura from Chaos A.D. (1993).
- It is mentioned by the group Racionais MC's in their song "Diário de um Detento" from the album "Sobrevivendo No Inferno", and also in the song "19 Rebellions" by the British group Asian Dub Foundation.
- It inspired the song "Haiti" by Caetano Veloso with Gilberto Gil, protesting racial discrimination and social inequality, on their 1993 album Tropicália 2.
- "Roleta Macabra" by Facção Central from "O Espetáculo do Circo dos Horrores" (2006)
- "Aonde o Filho Chora e a Mãe Não Vê" by Facção Central from "O Espetáculo do Circo dos Horrores" (2006)
- "O Retorno ACDC A Prisão" by Sabotage from "Uma Luz que Nunca Irá se Apagar" (2001)
- "Homenagem Póstuma" by Facção Central from "O Espetáculo do Circo dos Horrores" (2006)
- "Mandando Bronca" by Pavilhão 9 from Cadeia Nacional (1997)

=== Movies ===
- In the movie Elite Squad: The Enemy Within, the incident was referenced when denying BOPE's colonel's request to allow prison inmates access to the enemy faction's prison block.
- Carandiru by Héctor Babenco (2003)
- Prisioneiro da Grade de Ferro - autorretratos by Paulo Sacramento (2003)

=== Books ===
- This event was documented in the book Estação Carandiru by Dráuzio Varella (1999)
- Uma Porta para a Vida by Celso Bueno de Godoy Junior
- Carandiru: o Caldeirão do diabo by Celso Bueno de Godoy Junior
- Diário de um Detento by former inmate Jocenir
- O outro lado do muro - Ladrões, humildes, vacilões e bandidões nas prisões paulistas by Silvio Cavalcante and Osvaldo Valente (1997)
- Pavilhão 9 - O Massacre do Carandiru by Elói Pietá and Justino Pereira
- Vidas do Carandiru - Histórias Reais by Humberto Rodrigues (2003)

=== Television ===
- Carandiru, Outras Histórias by Rede Globo (2006)

== See also ==
- List of massacres in Brazil
