= Sharing This Walk =

Book by Karina Biondi

Sharing This Walk: An Ethnography of Prison Life and the PCC in Brazil
- Author: Karina Biondi
- Original title: Junto e Misturado: Uma Etnografia do PCC
- Translator: John F. Collins
- Language: Portuguese
- Genre: Non-fiction
- Publisher: University of North Carolina Press
- Publication place: Brazil
- Pages: 248
- ISBN: 978-1-4696-3030-4 (Hardcover)

Sharing This Walk: An Ethnography of Prison Life and the PCC in Brazil is a book written by anthropologist Karina Biondi, edited and translated by John F. Collins, and published by the University of North Carolina Press in 2016. This book delves into the intricacies of the Brazilian prison gang Premeiro Comando da Capital (PCC), or First Command of the Capital. Biondi's extensive ethnographic analysis of the group challenges the traditional definitions of organized crime and hierarchy through the analysis of the politics and history of the PCC.

This is Biondi's first full-length book; her prior research also focuses on the PCC.

== Synopsis ==
This book describes years of research conducted by Karina Biondi within and outside of many of Sao Paulo's prisons. After conducting her in person interviews and through examining her personal experiences with PCC members, Biondi argues that the typical portrayals of the PCC are incorrect and that the organization is very complex. She primarily focuses on the PCC in terms of their political actions as well as their lack of hierarchy which is touched upon in four different chapters. In Chapter 1, Biondi gives a brief history of the PCC and the various myths that surround the origin of the founding of the organization. Her historical story begins with the description of the 1992 Carandiru prison massacre which left 111 inmates dead. This massacre sparked a wave of prison riots and within these organized revolts, the PCC emerged as an influential organization. The true origin of the PCC is debated, but overall Biondi concludes that understanding the uniting purpose of prison mistreatment is a central element to be able to understand the PCC and its control in today's prisons. Chapter 2 focuses on the PCC's emphasis on pedagogy and politics within the prison walls. In this section, Biondi stresses the necessity for both prisoners within and visitors to a PCC-controlled to learn their appropriate roles and how which actions are deemed appropriate. This emphasis on teaching the correct actions leads to a greater adherence to the PCC's standards. Biondi stresses that this obedience, while prevalent, is not uniform across all prison's due to the command structure of the group.

The main ideas and focuses of Chapters 3 and four overlap because they both focus on the politics and categorization of the PCC as a whole. Biondi goes into detail about the various positions that each member of the PCC could hold and their importance within an organization that is not categorized by a strict hierarchy. Biondi counters traditional thoughts on group hierarchical structures and argues that within the PCC there is an idea that each member, or "Brother", singularly speaks for the group. That being said, within the organization there are a few that are considered to lead, called "Towers", statements and initiatives, called "salves", but these leaders do not think of themselves as giving orders but instead as speaking for the collective. The lack of hierarchy, Biondi argues is what has allowed the PCC to gain and hold onto their power. She describes their political actions as "transcendent" of both typical power structures as well as the usual need for territory.

== Critical reception ==
Critical reviews of Sharing this Walk are primarily positive. Eraldo S. Santos, a PhD candidate from the University of Paris, shared his review of the book through the London School of Economics and Political Science. In his review, Santos describes this book as "more relevant than ever" and that this book "invites the reader to see prison life in a different, more critical light". Alongside his praises of the book, Santos does critique Biondi on her decision to focus primarily on the idea of "equality" instead of framing the discourse around "exclusion" versus "inclusion". The lack of a different and traditional theoretical frame was also touched upon by Francesca Cerbini in an issue of Current Anthropology. Cerbini critiques Biondi's little use of the existing anthropological theoretical frameworks within her analysis, but also describes this book as "one of the most insightful works on the 'inner' Brazilian society".
