= Miguelópolis =

- Municipality
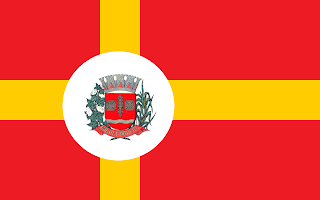
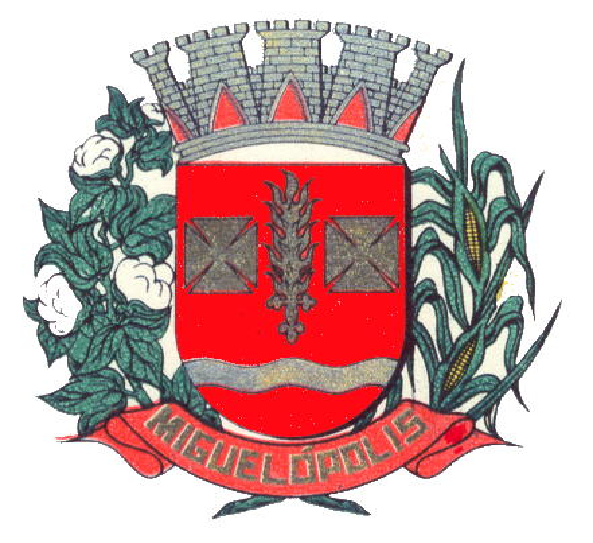
- Flag Coat of arms

- Location in São Paulo state

- Location in Brazil
- Coordinates: 20°10′46″S 48°1′55″W
- Country: Brazil
- Region: Southeast
- State: São Paulo

Area
  - Total: 821 km^{2} (317 sq mi)

Population (2020)
  - Total: 22,355
  - Density: 27.2/km^{2} (70.5/sq mi)
- Time zone: UTC−3 (BRT)

Miguelópolis is a municipality in the state of São Paulo in Brazil. The population is 22,355 (2020 est.) in an area of 821 km^{2}. The elevation is 510 m.

== History ==
The municipality was created by state law in 1944.

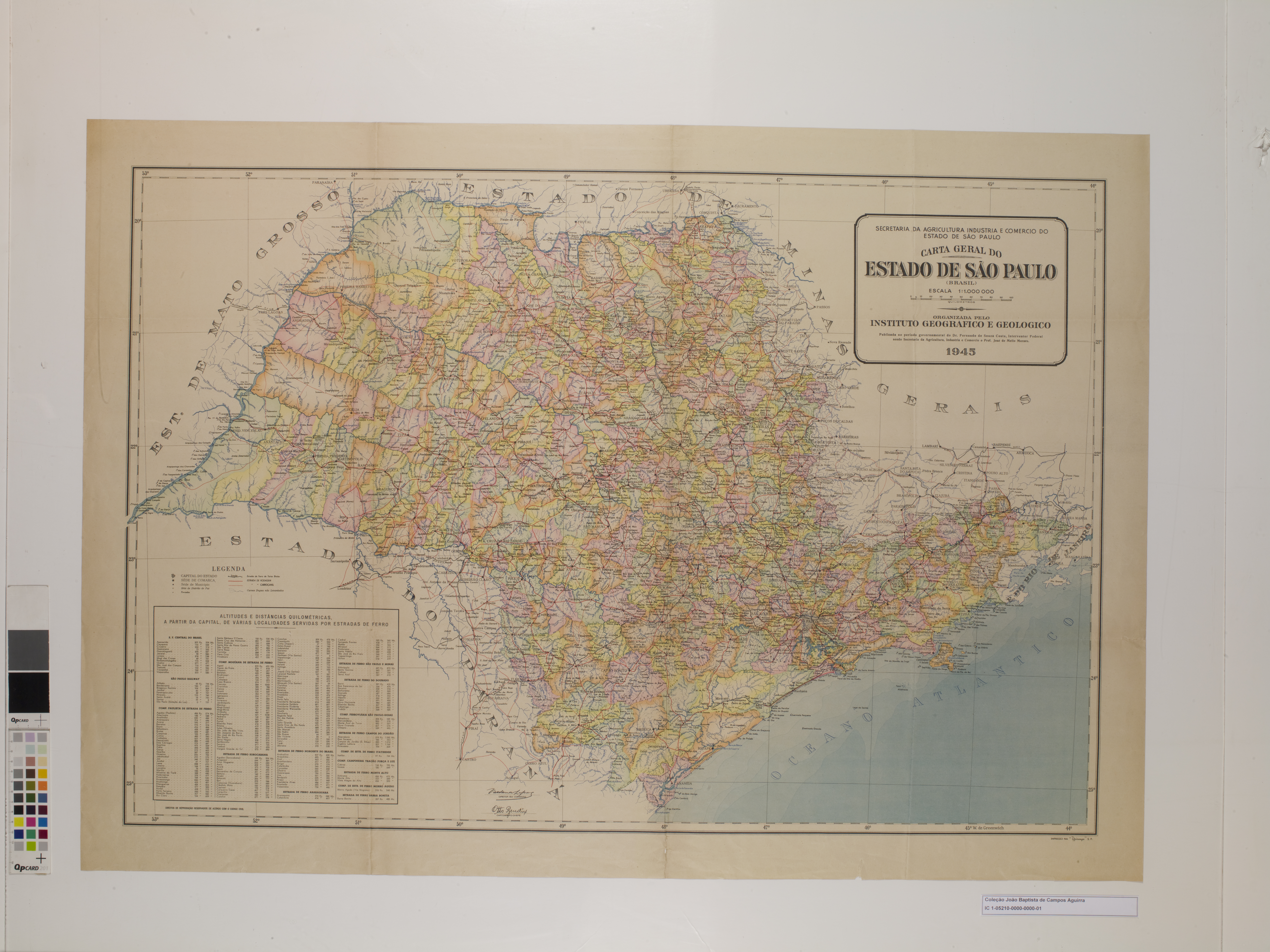
Map of the state of São Paulo (1944).

== Religion ==
Christianity is present in the city as follows:

=== Catholic Church ===
The Catholic church in the municipality is part of the Roman Catholic Diocese of Barretos.

=== Protestant Church ===
The most diverse evangelical beliefs are present in the city, mainly Pentecostal, including the Assemblies of God in Brazil (the largest evangelical church in the country), Christian Congregation in Brazil, among others. These denominations are growing more and more throughout Brazil.

== Notable residents ==
- Luana Barbosa dos Reis (1981–2016).

== See also ==
- List of municipalities in São Paulo
