= Killing of Luana Barbosa dos Reis =

2016 incident of police brutality in Brazil

On 8 April 2016, Luana Barbosa dos Reis (12 November 1981 – 13 April 2016), a gay Afro-Brazilian woman, was fatally injured after being assaulted by police officers in Ribeirão Preto, São Paulo, dying five days later at a local hospital. Following her death, human rights groups raised concerns that she had been a victim of police brutality and a victim of racism, homophobia and sexism. In 2017, three officers were cleared of wrongdoing in relation to her death.

== Personal life ==
Luana Barbosa dos Reis
- Born: November 12, 1981; Miguelópolis, São Paulo, Brazil
- Died: April 13, 2016 (aged 34); São Paulo

Reis was born on 12 November 1981 in Miguelópolis, São Paulo, to Eurípedes and Luis dos Reis. Luis was shot dead two days after Reis' birth, though the family did not learn about his murder until his body was discovered at the Cementerio de Perus, north of São Paulo, 40 days later. Reis had one sister, named Roseli.

As an adult, Reis served a custodial prison sentence for weapons possession and robbery. After her release in 2009, she continued her studies while working as a cleaner, waitress, and salesperson.

== Death ==
On 8 April 2016 at around 19:00, Reis left her home in the Jardim Paiva neighbourhood of Riberão Preto with her 14-year-old son when military police officers approached her at the corner of her street in order to search her. According to Reis' sister, Reis requested a female officer complete the search; she was refused a search entirely when this request was denied, and was then assaulted by the officers.

Lieutenant Colonel Francisco Mango Neto of the Military Police denied that Reis had been assaulted and stated that she had been arrested under suspicion of driving a stolen motorcycle, with officers acting in self-defence when Reis "challenged and assaulted" them. A witness gave a different account, describing Reis as being "brutally assaulted" by at least six police officers.

Reis died on 13 April 2016, five days after being assaulted, of brain ischemia as a result of a traumatic brain injury at the Hospital das Clínicas.

== Investigation ==
The Order of Attorneys of Brazil suspended the officers involved in Reis' death pending the conclusion of its investigation, after Eduardo Silveira Martins, the coordinator of the OAB's Commission on Black and Anti-Discrimination Affairs, raised concerns that the officers could influence the investigation.

On 3 February 2017, the Military Justice of the State of São Paulo closed the investigation against three police officers, issuing a statement reporting that the Public Prosecutor's Office had ruled that there was no evidence of a military crime having taken place. Robinete Le Fosse, the prosecutor, had requested the closure of the investigation citing "the total absence of criminal material".

== Response ==
A protest demonstration by Reis' family members and human rights activists took place on 23 April 2016 outside the Pedro II Theatre in Riberão Preto against lesbophobia, racism and the impunity of the attackers.

UN Women and the United Nations High Commissioner for Human Rights issued a statement on 4 May 2016 calling for an "impartial investigation" into Reis' death, describing concerns that she had experienced "sexism, racism, and lesbophobia" in the events leading up to her death.

Julio César Fernandes Neves, the ombudsman, requested that the Attorney General's Office appoint a prosecutor to follow up on investigations. He also asked the inspector of the Military Police of the State of São Paulo, Colonel Levi Anastácio Félix, about witness reports filed with the Ministry of the Interior alleging that Reis had been hospitalised after receiving "blows" by officers Douglas Luiz de Paula, Fabio Donizetti Pultz, and André Donizetti Camilo "during an apprehension".

On 2 May 2016, at a service to commemorate victims of torture under the military dictatorship at the Centre for Internal Defence Operations, a former torture centre in Rio de Janeiro, Reis was also memorialised.

Rildo Marques de Oliveira, the president of the São Paulo Council for the Defence of Human Rights, accused officers of committing an "abuse of power" in their approach to Reis.
