= Carandiru Penitentiary =

- Casa de Detenção de São Paulo
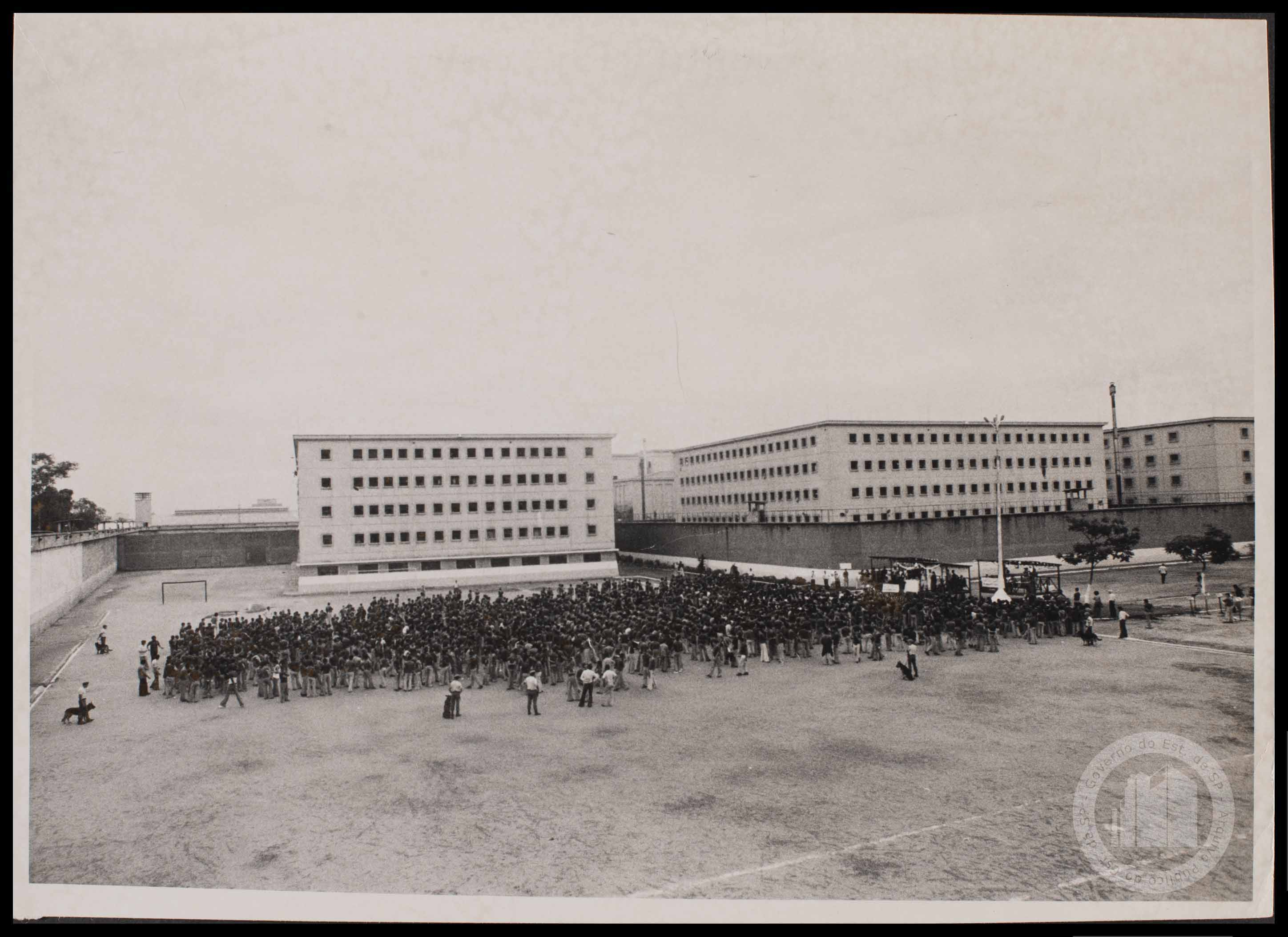
- The prison in the 1970s
- Interactive map of the Carandiru Penitentiary area

General information
- Status: Demolished
- Type: Prison
- Location: São Paulo, Brazil
- Coordinates: 23°30′30″S 46°37′25″W
- Completed: 1920
- Demolished: 2002

Design and construction
- Architect: Samuel das Neves

Carandiru Penitentiary, officially São Paulo House of Detention (Portuguese: Casa de Detenção de São Paulo) was a penitentiary located in the North Zone of São Paulo, Brazil. It was inaugurated on April 21, 1920 and was built by the engineer-architect Samuel das Neves.

The name Casa de Detenção (House of Detention) was given by federal interventor Ademar Pereira de Barros who, on December 5, 1938, by state decree 9,789, abolished the Cadeia Pública (Public Jail) and the Presídio Político da Capital (Political Prison of the Capital). This decree provided for the separation of first-time offenders from repeat offenders and the separation of prisoners based on the nature of their crime.

It once housed more than eight thousand prisoners, and was considered the largest prison in Latin America at the time. It was the site of the Carandiru massacre on October 2, 1992. It was deactivated and partially demolished in 2002, during the government of Geraldo Alckmin, making way for the Parque da Juventude. In 2019, the remaining buildings and structures of the Penitentiary Complex (the remaining pavilions, the Penitentiary gate, the remaining structures of the prison walls and the prison-hostel building) were listed by the São Paulo Municipal Government, considering that the preservation of the complex is fundamental to Brazil's prison history. According to architect Anna Beatriz Ayroza Galvão, a teacher at Escola da Cidade and former superintendent of IPHAN, we should not "erase the memory of pain". "If that were the case, all the concentration camps would have been destroyed; it is important to leave the marks of this pain so that atrocities like this one are not repeated in our history", she explained.

== History ==
=== 1920s-1940s ===
The penitentiary complex began in the 1920s with the creation of the Penitenciária do Estado (State Penitentiary) under the care of Ramos de Azevedo. The São Paulo State Penitentiary, located in the North Zone of the capital, was inaugurated on April 21, 1920, at a time when ideas of resocializing prisoners were gaining strength. Inspired by the architectural model of the Fresnes Prison in France, the construction was seen as an innovation for the time, being considered an example of efficiency and modernity in the first years of its operation. The penitentiary represented an effort by the government to create a prison environment that promoted the recovery of inmates, in line with international trends of humanizing the prison system.

For two decades, from 1920 to 1940 - the year in which it reached its maximum designed capacity of 1,200 inmates - the prison, then called Instituto de Regeneração Regeneration Institute, was considered a standard of excellence in the Americas, attracting the visits of countless politicians, law students, Italian legal authorities and even personalities such as Claude Lévi-Strauss, who came to São Paulo to visit it. In 1936, Stefan Zweig wrote in his book, Encounters and Destinies "that the exemplary cleanliness and hygiene turned the prison into a factory of work. It was the prisoners who baked the bread, prepared the medicines, provided services in the clinic and hospital, grew vegetables, washed the clothes, painted and drew pictures and took classes."

=== 1950s-1990s ===
In 1956, the penitentiary underwent a major transformation and was reclassified as a Detention Center, a change that involved expanding its capacity. Initially designed to house a limited number of inmates, its capacity was doubled to hold up to 3,250 inmates. However, with population growth and rising crime rates over the decades, overcrowding quickly became a problem, culminating in the formation of what would later become known as the Carandiru Penitentiary Complex. By the late 1990s, Carandiru had become the largest prison in Latin America, with a prison population that exceeded 8,000 inmates, far beyond its designed capacity. The precarious living conditions within the complex and the overcrowding contributed to increased tension and violence, which culminated in a major tragedy.

==== 1992 Massacre ====
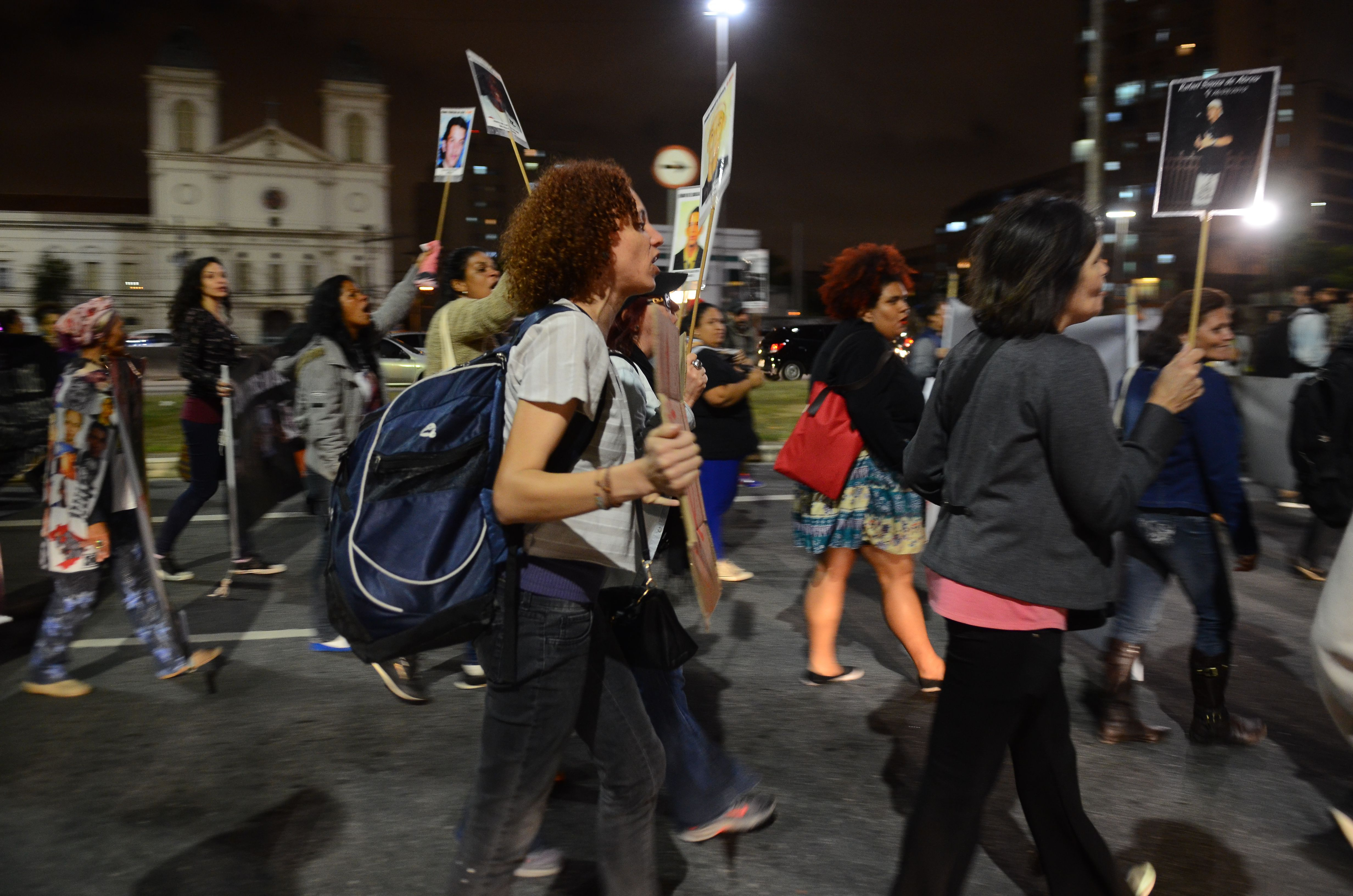
Act in memory of those killed in the massacre (2016)

On October 2, 1992, a riot took over the prison, leading to the intervention of the Military Police of São Paulo State. The result was the so-called "Carandiru Massacre", in which 111 inmates were killed, an event that shocked the country and brought to light the structural flaws and abuses committed within the prison system. The song "Diário de um detento", by the rap group Racionais MC's, describes the lives of the inmates and, especially, the episode known as the "Carandiru Massacre". In 2000, the group 509-E was created inside the prison. The group recorded two albums inside the prison, selling a lot of copies for the Brazilian rap market. According to many inmates, the official death toll during the invasion of the PMSP is lower than the real number - which would be at least 250 inmates. The commander of the operation, Colonel Ubiratan Guimarães, faced a jury trial in 2001 and was sentenced to six centuries in prison, but appealed, claiming he had acted in strict compliance with his duty, and was acquitted in February 2006 (he was murdered seven months later, in September). The police operation had its trial scheduled by the Court of Justice of São Paulo for January 28, 2013, and among the defendants were 28 of the more than one hundred police officers accused.

After being postponed twice, the first of four trials of police officers accused of the Carandiru massacre began in April 2013. That month, 23 police officers involved in the massacre were sentenced to 156 years in prison each for the murder of 13 inmates. In August 2013, another 25 police officers involved in the massacre were sentenced to 624 years each for the deaths of 52 inmates. In April 2014, 15 other police officers accused of killing eight inmates and attempting to murder two others were found guilty. Each of the defendants was sentenced to 48 years in prison, 12 years for each of the four deaths, and acquitted of the other four, since these victims died with a sharp weapon. They were also acquitted of the attempted murder charges. The decision provided for the sentence to be served in a closed regime, but allowed the defendants the right to appeal while free, as they had responded to the trial up until that point.

Although the UN urged Brazil to bring justice to those most affected by the massacre in September 2016, the court declared the Carandiru massacre trial null and void. The court ruled that the massacre was an act of self-defense and that there was a lack of evidence linking the individual police officers to the murders. The prosecutor subsequently filed an appeal, and the case remains ongoing. None of the convicted police officers served their sentences. Since the massacre, the Brazilian federal government has passed new legislation to reform the prison system, which has not yet been implemented.

=== Deactivation in the 2000s ===
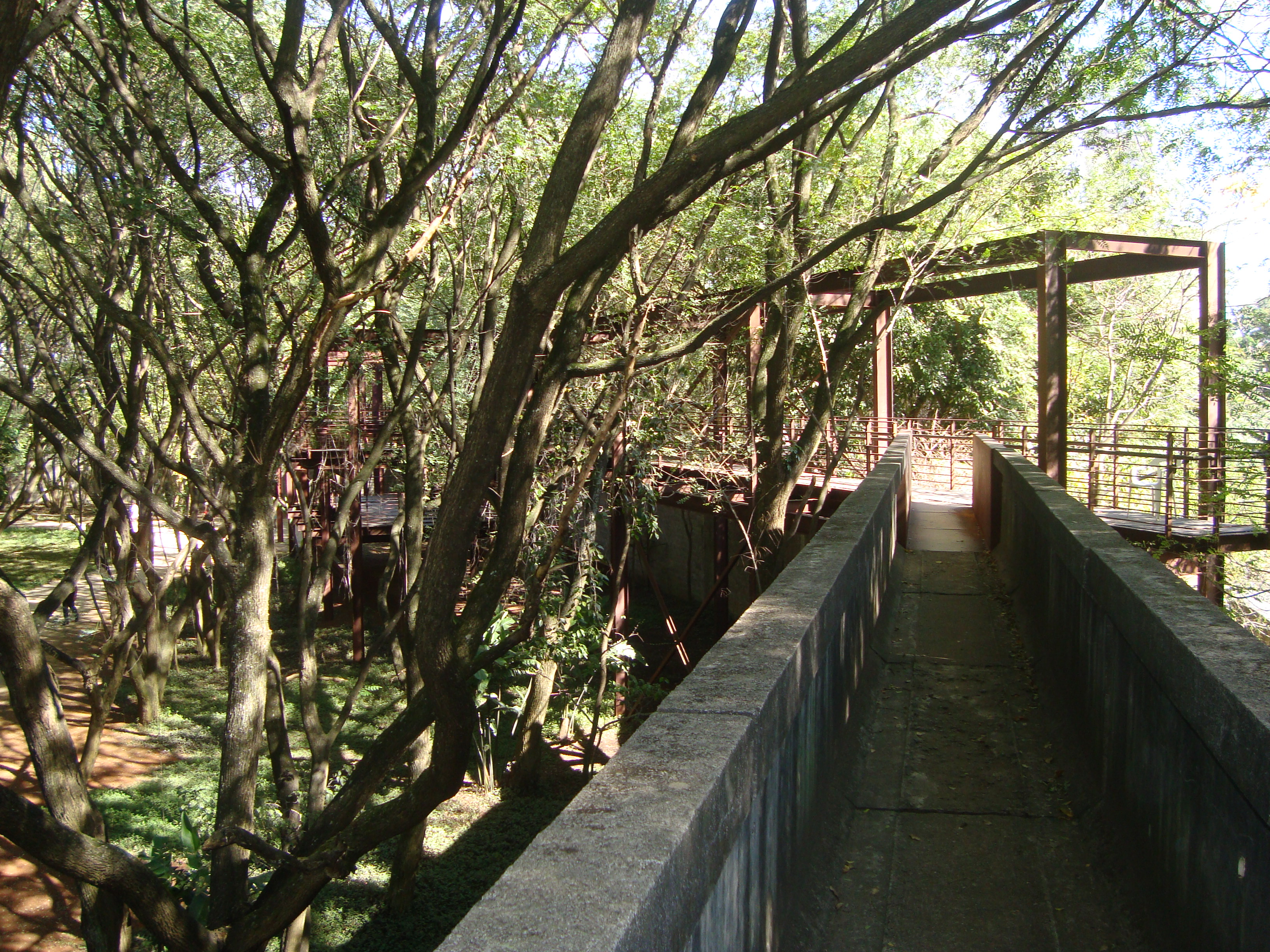
Remains of the penitentiary wall transformed into walkways in Parque da Juventude

The partial demolition of the complex began on December 8, 2002, when pavilions 6, 8, and 9 were demolished manually, symbolically marking the end of an era for the São Paulo prison system. The following year, in 2003, the site underwent a revitalization process and gained a new function, being transformed into the Parque da Juventude, a leisure and public gathering area that occupies 240 thousand square meters.

In addition to the Biblioteca de São Paulo (BSP), the park has sports and cultural facilities, including the Parque da Juventude State Technical School, which offers regular courses in nursing, computer science, music, and singing. The space has become a symbol of renewal and transformation, occupying a place of memory and reflection on the past, while also offering opportunities for learning and development for the community.

== In popular culture ==
=== Television ===
The third season of the American television series Prison Break was inspired by the São Paulo Detention Center and the San Pedro Penitentiary in Bolivia. In the series, the penitentiary is called Sona (Sona Federal Penitentiary).

The location also became known for a controversial and rare edition of the Brazilian variety program Domingo Legal, where the medium Socorro Leite and then-presenter Gugu Liberato visited the area, which has since been deactivated, during the month of May 2002. This episode was marked by the psychic's screams of fear and the sensationalist tone of the reports, leading the latter to prevent the broadcast of this event in any media. Currently, only part of Socorro's visit is available on YouTube.

=== Literature ===
- Estação Carandiru by Dráuzio Varella
- Diário de um Detento by Jocenir
- Vidas do Carandiru - Histórias Reais by Humberto Rodrigues
- Às Cegas by Luís Alberto Mendes
- Sobrevivente André du Rap, do Massacre do Carandiru by André du Rap
- Código de Cela, o mistério das prisões by Guilherme S. Rodrigues
- Memórias de um Sobrevivente by Luís Alberto Mendes
- Cela Forte mulher by Antônio Carlos Prado
- Pavilhão 9, Paixão e morte no Carandiru by Hosmany Ramos
- Carandirú: o Caldeirão do diabo by Celso Bueno de Godoy
- Uma porta para a vida by Celso Bueno de Godoy

=== Cinema ===
- O Prisioneiro da Grade de Ferro (Autorretratos), by Paulo Sacramento (2003). Documentary made by the prisoners themselves, one year before the deactivation of the Carandiru Detention Center.
- Carandiru, film by Hector Babenco (2003)
