= Candiru =

Candiru may refer to:

- Candiru (fish), a number of fish species known by this common name
- Candiru phlebovirus, a virus
- Candiru, an Israeli spyware company

== See also ==
- Carandiru (disambiguation)
