= Rondas Ostensivas Tobias de Aguiar =

São Paulo police tactical unit

Tobias de Aguiar Ostensive Patrols
- Rondas Ostensivas Tobias de Aguiar
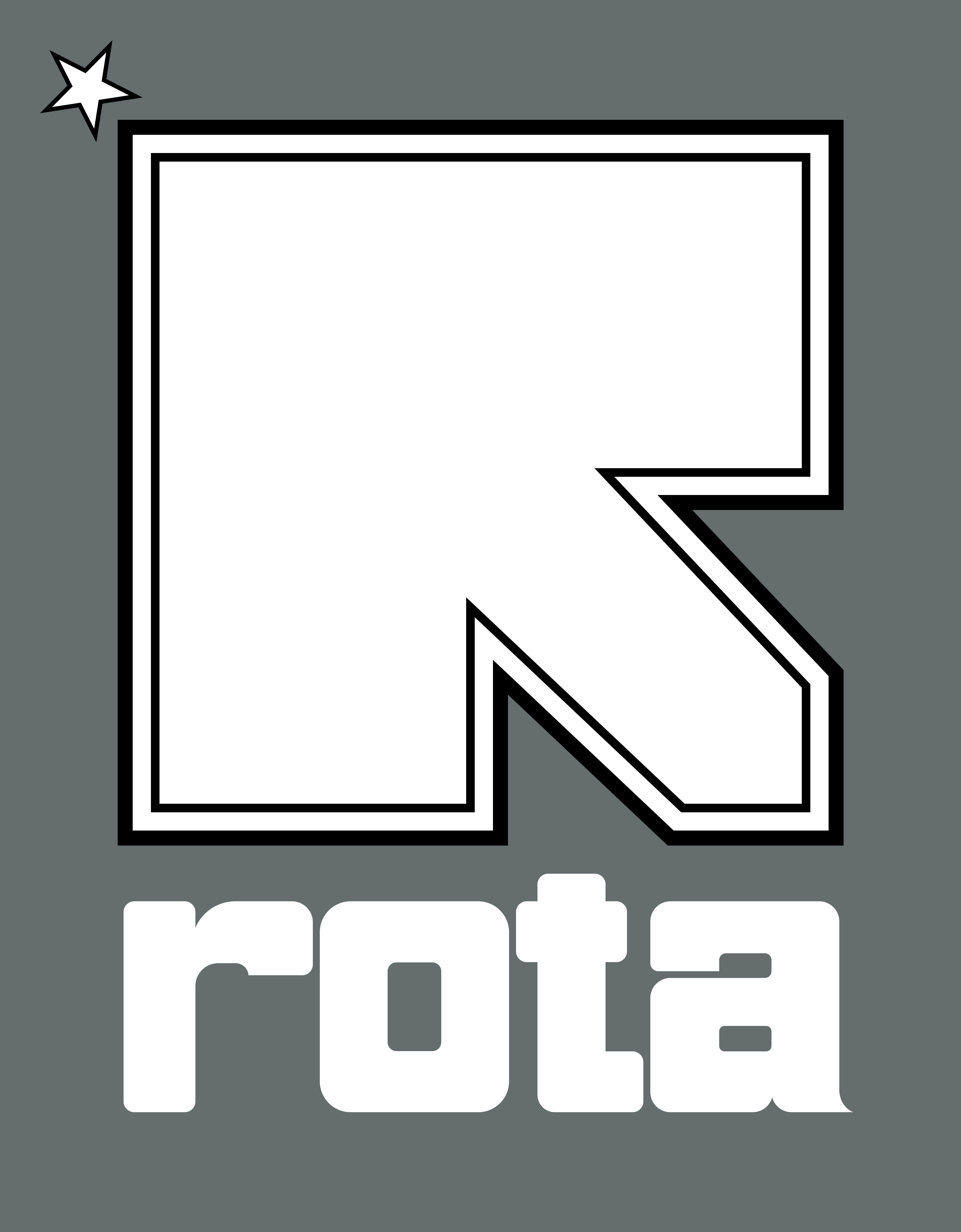
- Founded: 15 October 1970; 55 years ago
- Country: Brazil
- Allegiance: Riot Control Police Command
- Type: Police Tactical Unit
- Role: Law enforcement High-risk patrols Quick reaction force
- Size: Circa 500 policemen, 100 vehicles
- Part of: São Paulo Military Police
- Headquarters: Avenida Tiradentes, 440; Luz; São Paulo, Brazil
- Nicknames: ROTA; Black Berets (Boinas Negras)
- Patron: Tobias de Aguiar
- Motto: Dignity Above All (Dignidade Acima de Tudo)
- Colors: Grey; Black; Yellow

Commanders
- Commander-in-Chief: Governor Tarcísio de Freitas
- Secretary of Public Security: João Camilo Pires de Campos
- Military Police Commander: Fernando Alencar Medeiros
- Commander of ROTA: José Augusto Coutinho

Insignia
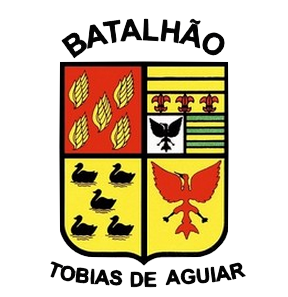
- Coat of Arms

The 1st Riot Police Battalion of the São Paulo Military Police, also known as Rondas Ostensivas Tobias de Aguiar (Portuguese for Tobias de Aguiar Ostensive Patrols) is a tactical police unit, mostly known by its acronym ROTA (also Portuguese for route). Focusing on flexibility and quick reaction, its responsibilities include heavily armed motorized patrols, as well as deployment in the event of civil unrest to restore public order and counter-insurgency operations.

== History ==
After the abdication of Dom Pedro I in April 1831, a period of institutional instability known as the Regency ensued in Brazil. The need for a trained force at the provincial level to ensure public order led to the creation of the Permanent Municipal Guard in 30 August 1831, which was essentially a military force but organized, equipped and paid by the provinces. This would be the starting point for what would later become the Brazilian military police. In the province of São Paulo, the Municipal Guard Corps was created by Brigadier Tobias de Aguiar, then Governor of the province, in 15 December 1831.

In the 1st of December 1891 a new barracks was built for the Public Force at Tiradentes Avenue, in the Luz neighborhood, in the city of São Paulo. This building, designed by Ramos de Azevedo, hosted the 1st and 2nd Military Corps, who would later become 1st and 2nd Military Police Battalions.

The 1st Riot Police Battalion "Tobias de Aguiar" traces its origins to the 1st Caçador Battalion of São Paulo's Public Force, a battalion known for having participated in several historical conflicts such as the Naval Revolt, Federalist Revolution and Canudos War, as well as the São Paulo Revolt of 1924 and Constitutionalist Revolution.

In the 1st of December 1951, by a state decree, the battalion's name was changed from "1st Caçador Battalion" to "Tobias de Aguiar Battalion", in honor of the founder of the São Paulo Municipal Guard.

In 1970, in response to a wave of bank robberies carried out by communist guerrillas in São Paulo against the military government, the 2nd Security Company of the Tobias de Aguiar Battalion was selected for "ostensive motorized patrols" in the state. Eventually this company formed the "Ronda Bancária" (Bank Patrol Unit), responsible for providing a heavily armed patrol to quell bank robberies and other violent actions carried out by guerrillas and terrorist groups. From this, the Rondas Ostensivas Tobias de Aguiar battalion was created on 15 October 1970, being tasked with motorized patrols as well as counter-insurgency and providing a quick reaction force to other police units.

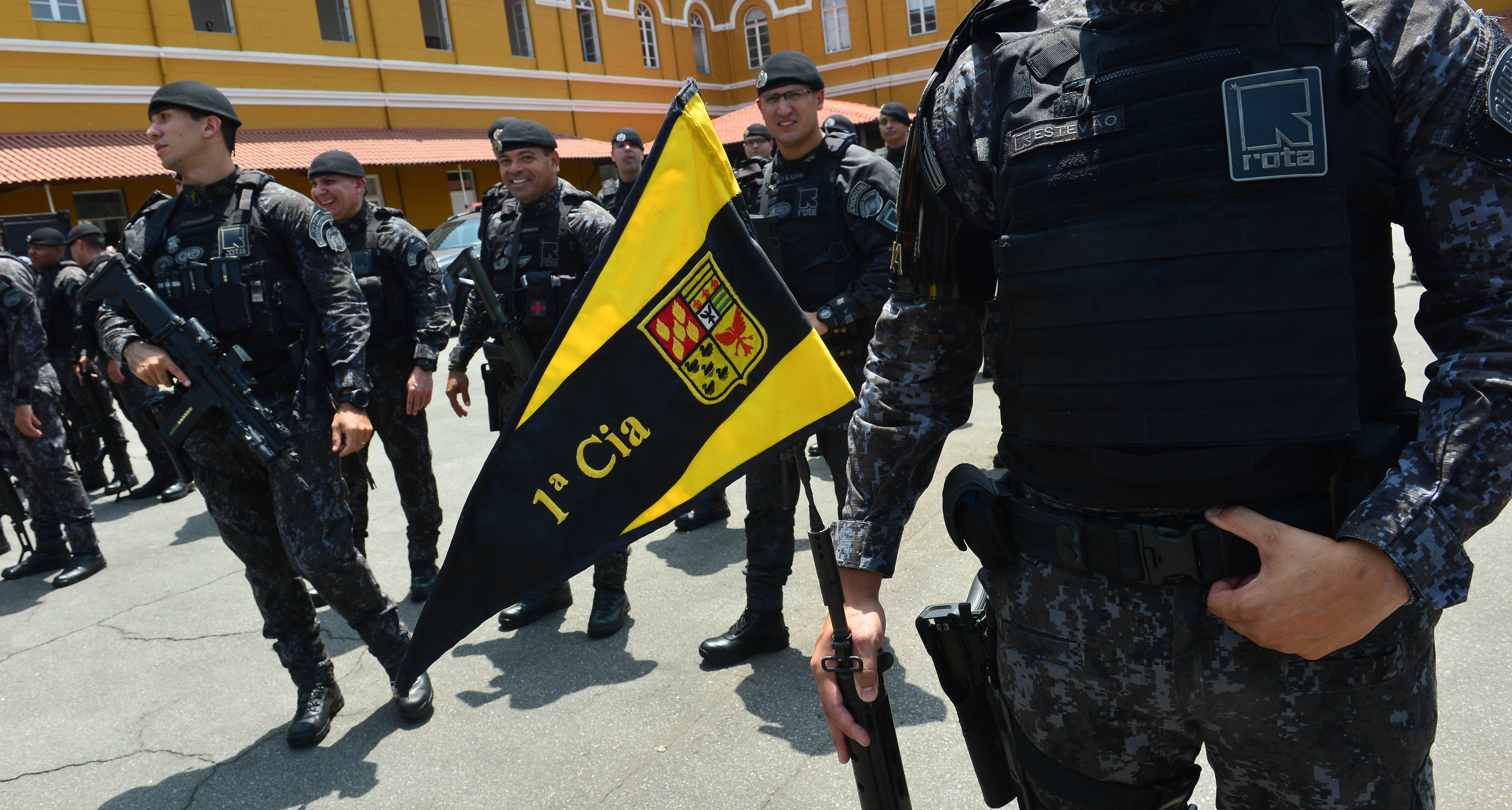
ROTA policemen in a 2023 ceremony.

Over the years, the battalion has been a target of criticism in Brazil due to their alleged use of excessive force and non-compliance with the law.

ROTA had a primary role in the killing of 111 inmates that followed the 1992 Carandiru prison riot. In a 2013 testimony, one of the officers involved in the action described the battalion as a "priesthood".

According to a 2019 UOL news piece, police data indicated ROTA as responsible for the killing of 1222 suspects in the period comprising January 2000 to March 2019, with 27 of the battalion's policemen being murdered during the same period. Of the 27, 26 were murdered whilst off-duty, in attacks that were deemed as reprisals by criminal organizations (such as the PCC).

In 2020, a São Paulo Military Police ombudsman appointed the unit as responsible for the increase in police killings in 2019 compared to 2018, claiming that, as an elite unit, ROTA was "influenced by the common sense thought that a good criminal is a dead criminal", and that they were "also influenced by the conservative discourse that permeates the state and the country".

In May 2021, ROTA was among the first PMESP units to be equipped with Axon Body 3 cameras.

== Training ==
Being expected to maneuver quickly in intense traffic and tight streets in SUV vehicles, all ROTA police officers must go through three levels of driving training.

- The first level starts with a theoretical lesson on their vehicles, including explanations on damages to car parts, cooling, brakes and ideal pressure for tyres. Then, the class heads to a circuit in Piracicaba for a road practice which includes weaving through cones at short and medium distances and emergency braking. This level also seeks to get students accustomed to using a '9 and 3' steering wheel hand position for the best control. Instructors will also turn on sirens and talk loudly to attempt to distract students during training.
- The second level teaches evasive maneuvers, including maneuvers whilst reversing, as well as turning at high speeds in conditions such as rain or off-road.
- The third level combines exercises from the first two levels and functions as a general road test.

Every ROTA member who wishes to be a driver needs to perform well during training and then "intern" for a time, only being definitely selected for the spot if he's approved by his squad and commanders. Drivers are accountable for their squad's cruisers, having the responsibility to perform general maintenance, including checking on motor oil, brake fluids, tyres, and keeping the vehicles clean.

ROTA officers are especially trained for actions centered around their vehicles, such as running rifle drills that involve firing and maneuvering in pairs after dismounting their cruisers.

== Vehicles ==
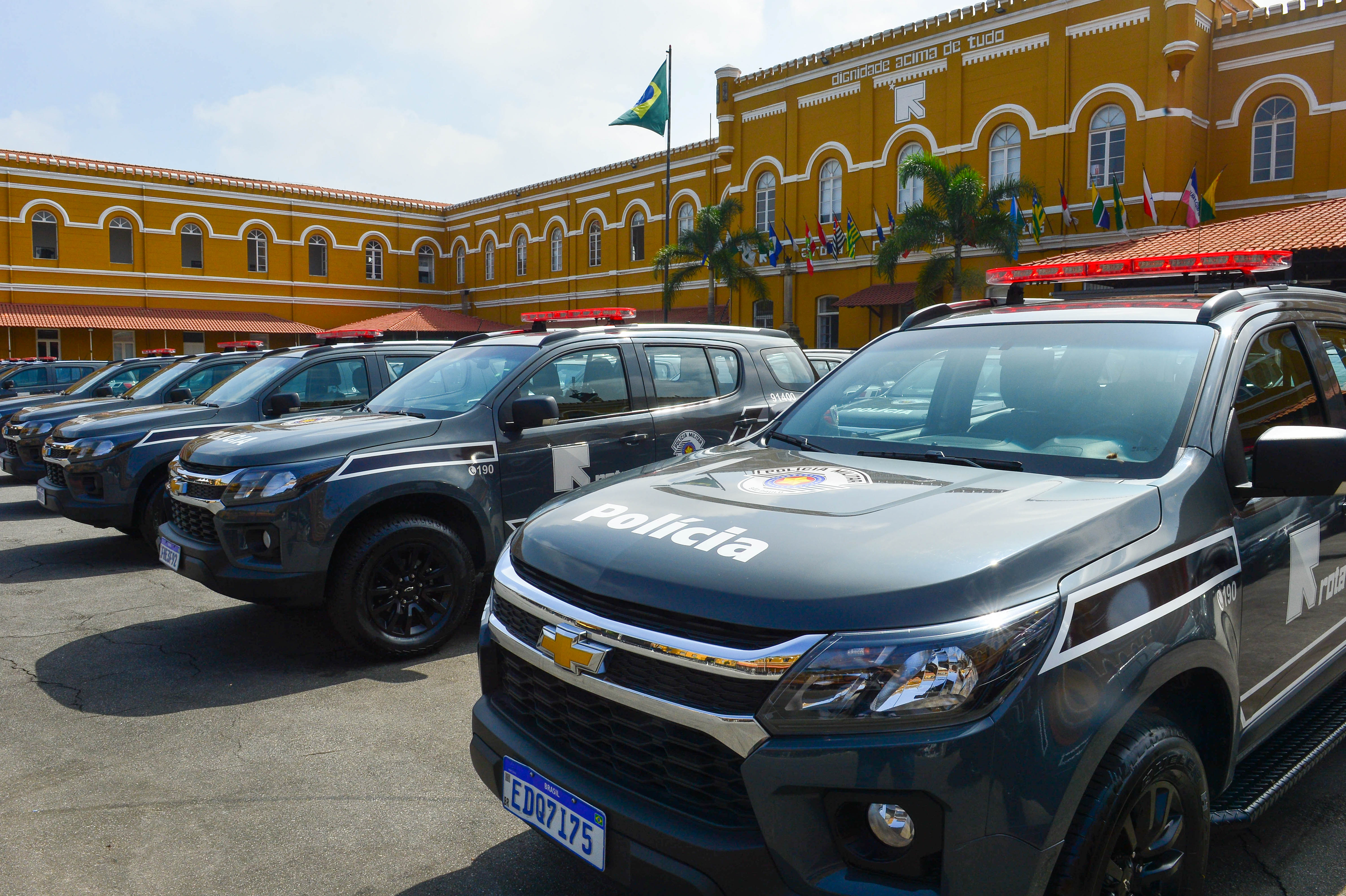
Parked ROTA Trailblazers.

Since the 1970s, ROTA has used the following vehicles:

- 1970s - 1990s - (United States) (Brazil) Chevrolet Veraneio
- 1990s - 2000s - (United States) (Brazil) Chevrolet Veraneio Custom D-20
- 2000s - 2010s - (United States) (Brazil) Chevrolet Blazer
- 2010s - (Japan) (Argentina) Toyota SW4
- 2014s - (United States) (Brazil) Chevrolet TrailBlazer

The Trailblazers were introduced from the mid-2010s due to the SW4 cruisers being considered prone to tipping over in sharp turns. Currently, the battalion uses SW4s and Trailblazers. The SW4s have four-cylinder gasoline engines and manual transmission, whilst the Trailblazers have four-cylinder turbodiesel engines and automatic transmissions.

== See also ==
- Comandos e Operações Especiais - PMESP's special operations tactical unit
- Grupo de Ações Táticas Especiais - PMESP's hostage rescue tactical unit
