= Military Police of São Paulo State =

Military law enforcement in Brazil

Military Police of Sao Paulo State Polícia Militar do Estado de São Paulo
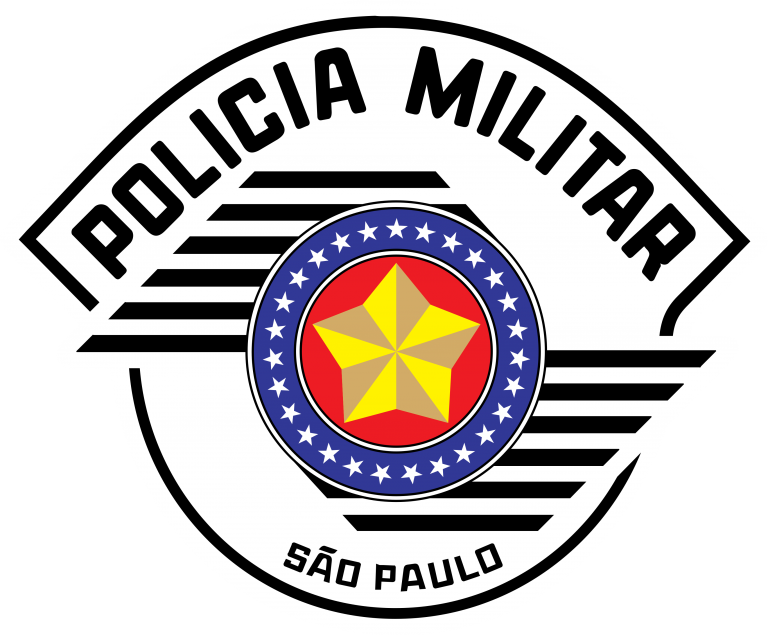

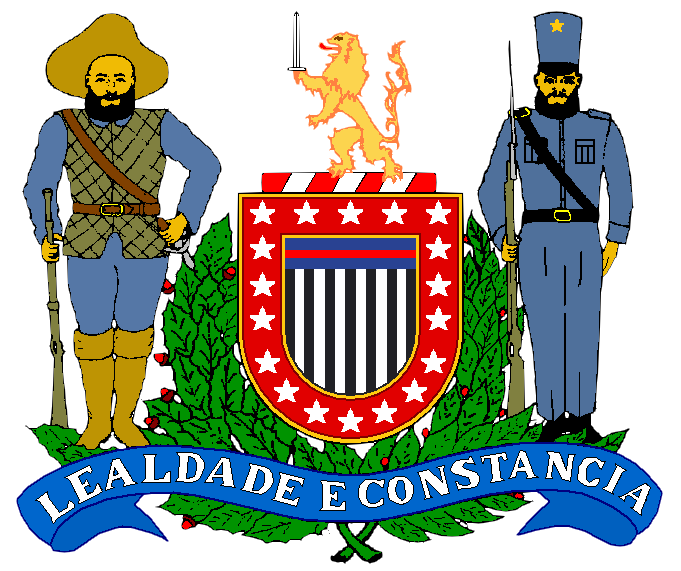
- Abbreviation: PMESP
- Motto: Lealdade e Constância; Loyalty and Constancy

Agency overview
- Formed: December 15, 1831

Jurisdictional structure
- Operations jurisdiction: São Paulo, Brazil
- Map of police jurisdiction.
- Area: 248,209.426 km^{2} (95,834.195 sq mi)
- Population: 41,055,734 (2006)
- Constituting instrument: Article 42 of Constitution of Brazil
- General nature: Gendarmerie

Operational structure
- Headquarters: São Paulo

Website
- www.policiamilitar.sp.gov.br/inicial.asp

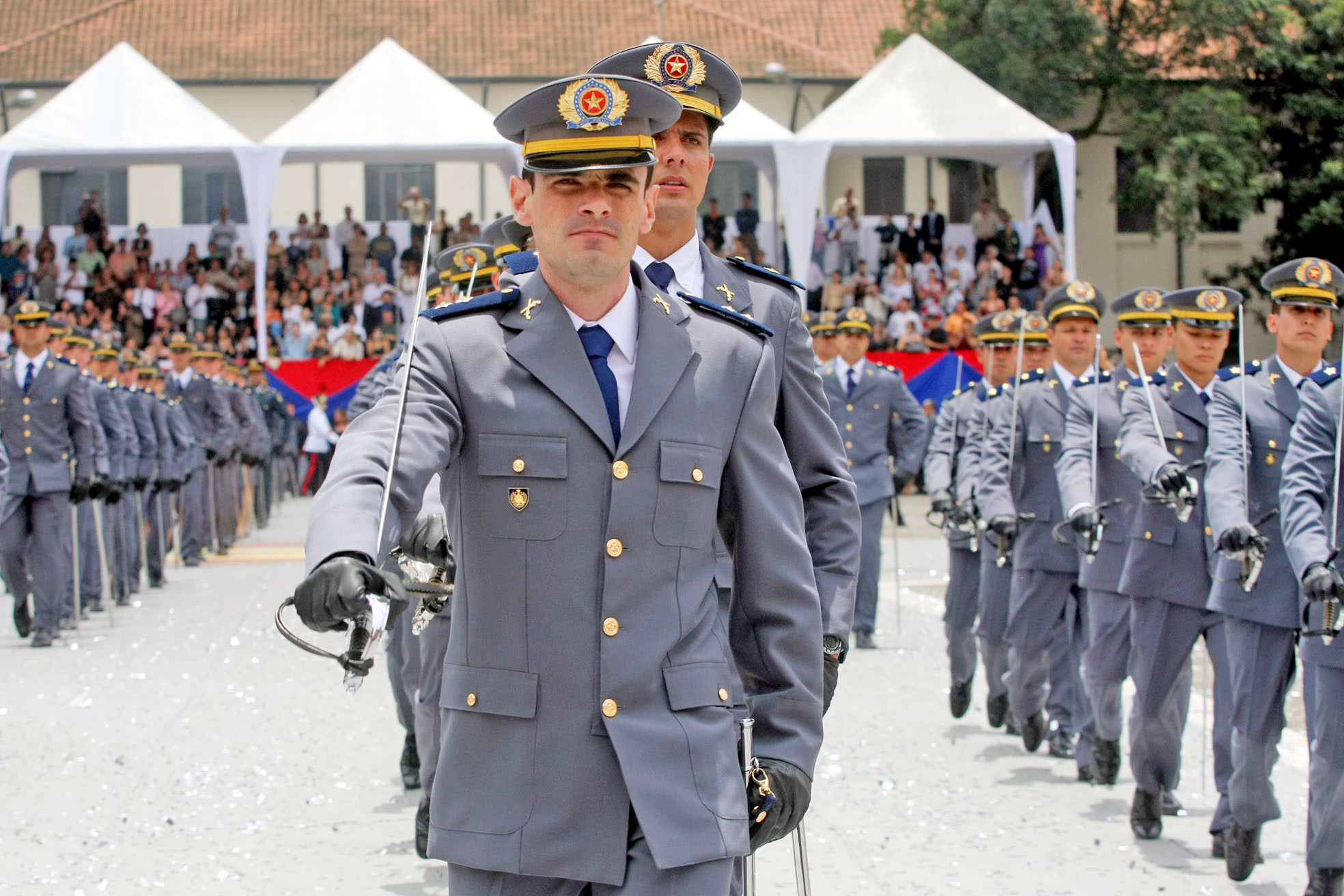
Graduation of Lieutenants at the Barro Branco Military Academy, of the Military Police of the São Paulo State.

The São Paulo State Military Police (Portuguese: Polícia Militar do Estado de São Paulo, PMESP) is a military law enforcement agency of the state of São Paulo, Brazil. It is the largest state police force in Brazil. According to São Paulo state law, the authorized strength of the Military Police is 93,802 personnel. However, the actual number of active personnel is approximately 80,000, in several battalions throughout the state as well as within the Greater São Paulo region which itself comprises 40 cities and towns.

It should not be confused with the military police of the Brazilian Armed Forces. In Brazil, State Military Police Officers are considered military personnel by the Brazilian constitution, however, they perform police duties among civilian populations. In certain cases, they can also act as reserve forces for the Brazilian Army.

Under the United Nations, in cooperation with the Brazilian Army, the Military Police of São Paulo State has served in Angola, Mozambique, Timor-Leste, Sudan, and Haiti.

== Mission and organization ==
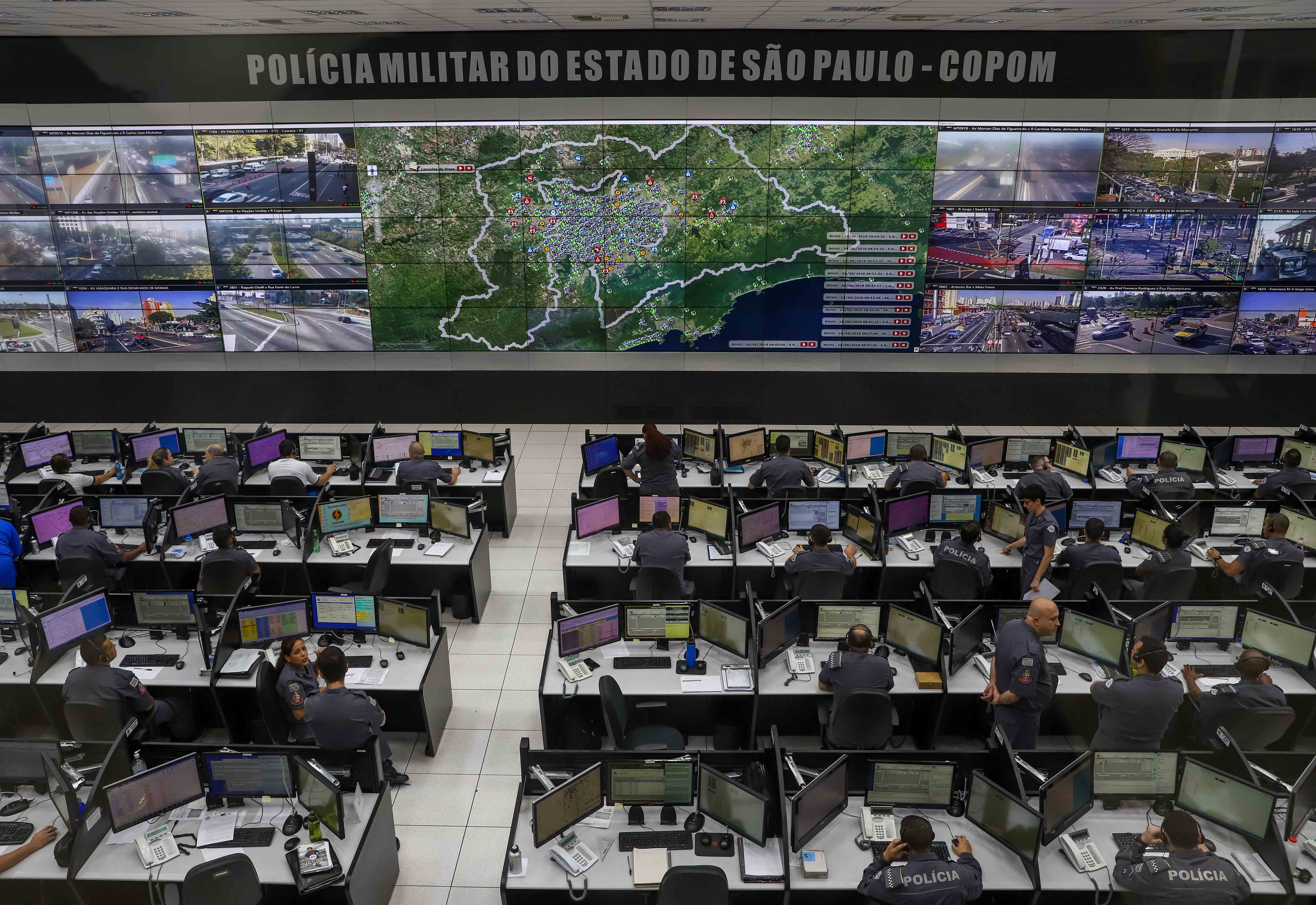
The Military Police Operations Center (COPOM), PMESP's TOC in São Paulo.

Its primary function is to perform the patrolling of public places such as city streets, state highways and forests in the entire state and also authority escorting, intelligence and reconnaissance (P2) and crime prevention duties. São Paulo Firefighters belongs to PMESP and are equally structured as a state police organization.

The PMESP is further divided into specialized units as follows:

- Police Cavalry Regiment "July 9th" is one of the most traditional Units of the Military Police of São Paulo State. Actually, it dates from the origins of the militia in the State, because when the Permanent Municipal Guard was created, on December 15, 1831, by the Brigadier Rafael Tobias de Aguiar, thirty men were designated for making up a "Cavalry Section". Nowadays, the Regiment "July 9th" is a special organ of execution, under the Command of Conflict Policing, aiming at preserving the public order in the whole state territory, in Rural and Urban Special Actions, as well as controlling tumults. Helping with the activities of Social and Cultural Communication, by means of the Fanfare Band, of the Horseback Riding School, of the Carrousel, of the Center of Horse therapy, of the Equestrian Sport and, mainly, of the Preventive Ostensible Policing with horses.
- 1°BPChq ROTA – Nowadays it is subordinated to the Shock Policing Command, having, as its main mission, the control of civil commotions and urban contra-guerrilla. Furthermore, the Unit executes the ostensible motorized patrolling denominated " ROTA " (Ostensive Patrols Tobias de Aguiar), seeking for the prevention and the repression of criminality in support to the Battalions of Area, saturating the areas of larger criminal rates. The ROTA is a tactical force that makes versatility, flexibility and strong reaction capacity possible. It's a reserve troop of the General Command of the Military Police of São Paulo State.
- 2°BPChq Anchieta – The 2nd Battalion of Shock Troops has the following missions: Control of Civil Commotions; Policing in Sports Areas; Policing during Artistic and cultural Events; ROCAM (Ostensible Patrol with Motorcycles).
- 3°BPChq Humaitá – Policing by foot and with vehicles, inspecting prisons, vehicles carrying valuable things, parades, military and funereal honors.
- 4°BPChq Operações Especiais –
  - Commandos and Special Operations - Operations in high-complexity environments such as rural, forest, mountain and cavernous areas, as well as favelas and combat diving; escorting of valuable armaments.
  - Group of Special Tactical Actions – occurrences with hostages and bomb disposal.
- 5°BPChq Canil;- K-9 Unit
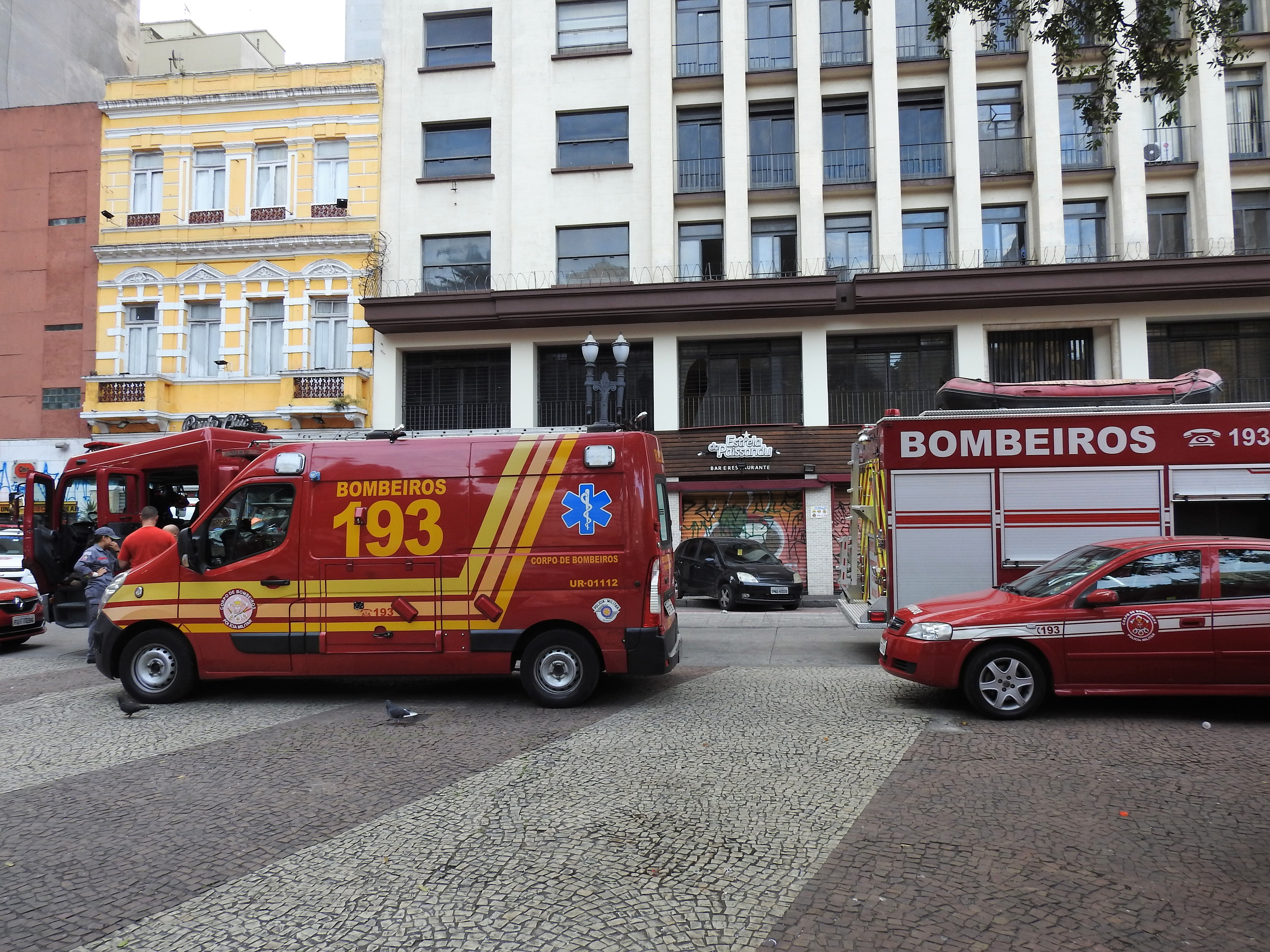
- PMESP Fire Brigade vehicles attending a fire
  Fire Brigade of PMESP – The creation of the Fire Brigade in São Paulo is dated March 10, 1880, as consequence of the disastrous fire on February 15 of that year, which destroyed the library and the file of the College of Law located then in the San Francisco Convent, at a traditional square in São Paulo City. Thus, in an incipient way, a long and difficult path had begun and it was by the spirit of sacrifice, by courage, by heroism and by the will of helping other people, examples of dedication and professionalism that crown the history of this Centennial Corporation, whose most important objective is to preserve life, property and the environment.
- São Paulo Highway Patrol – Traffic Highway Policing is executed on state highways to instruct the users to follow the traffic rules and regulations based on international standards highway security. It consists of the execution of inspection services, patrolling and traffic control, comprehending the following activities: policing in traffic lights, attending traffic occurrences, policing in special events, solemnities, escorting during dignitaries' visits, popular celebrations, sports competitions on streets, instructing students, escorting vehicles and drivers. The Highway Policing is managed for 5 battalions distributed alongside São Paulo Stadual Highways.
- GRPAe João Negrão – The Military Police of São Paulo State, the pioneer of the aviation in Brazil during the first decade of the last century, has contributed with important services to the society of São Paulo State and to the rest of the country in the use of its aircraft until the thirties, when it was extinct. With the evolution and development of the City of São Paulo, the largest and most important metropolis of South America, an increase and rising of the criminality has occurred, and the use of high technology in order to provide safety to society is necessary. Thus, the Military Police incorporated an agile, efficient and effective equipment for combating criminality: the helicopter "Eagle Uno", which had the mission to support the PM in all its activities. The date was August 15, 1984, and Aerial Radiopatrol Grouping was officially created. Their mandate is to uphold criminal law and enforce peace and order in the 247,000 km^{2} (95408 sq mi) of state territory, as well as to provide security to the state Governor and his family as well as state government buildings. They have at their disposal several helicopters such as the Helibras HB-350 Esquilo under the Águia (eagle) codename.

== History ==
Mounted Police officers in São Paulo, Brazil.

The police force was founded by Brigadier General Rafael Tobias de Aguiar on December 15, 1831, originally as the São Paulo Municipal Imperial Guard. The MPSP of today was raised in 1935 as a result of its involvement in the Constitutionalist Revolution of 1932.

The police has been accused of police brutality, including in the death of Luana Barbosa dos Reis in 2016. Three officers were ultimately cleared of wrongdoing in 2017.

== Weapons ==
Model	Origin	Type	Status
Taurus RT827S	Brazil	Revolver	Retired
Taurus PT24/7 PRO LS	Brazil	Semi-automatic pistol	Retired
Taurus PT101	Brazil	Semi-automatic pistol	Retired
Taurus PT640	Brazil	Semi-automatic pistol	Unknown
Glock 22	Austria	Semi-automatic pistol	Current
Remington 870	United States	Shotgun	Current
Pump CBC 12	Brazil	Shotgun	Current
Benelli M4	Italy	Shotgun	Current
Heckler & Koch MP5	Germany	Submachine gun	Current
Taurus SAF	Brazil	Submachine gun	Current
Taurus MT12	Brazil	Submachine gun	Current
B&T APC40 PRO	Switzerland	Submachine gun	Current
Colt M4A1	United States	Assault rifle	Current
Colt M16A2	United States	Assault rifle	Current
IMBEL IA2	Brazil	Assault rifle	Current
FN FAL	Belgium	Assault rifle	Current
FN SCAR	Belgium	Assault rifle	Current
SSG M1	Austria	Sniper rifle	Current
FN Model 30-11	Belgium	Sniper rifle	Current
IMBEL AGLC	Brazil	Sniper rifle	Current
AR10A4 Super SASS	United States	Sniper rifle	Current
Barrett M82	United States	Sniper rifle	Current
HK PSG1	Germany	Sniper rifle	Current
IWI Negev	Israel	Machine gun	Current

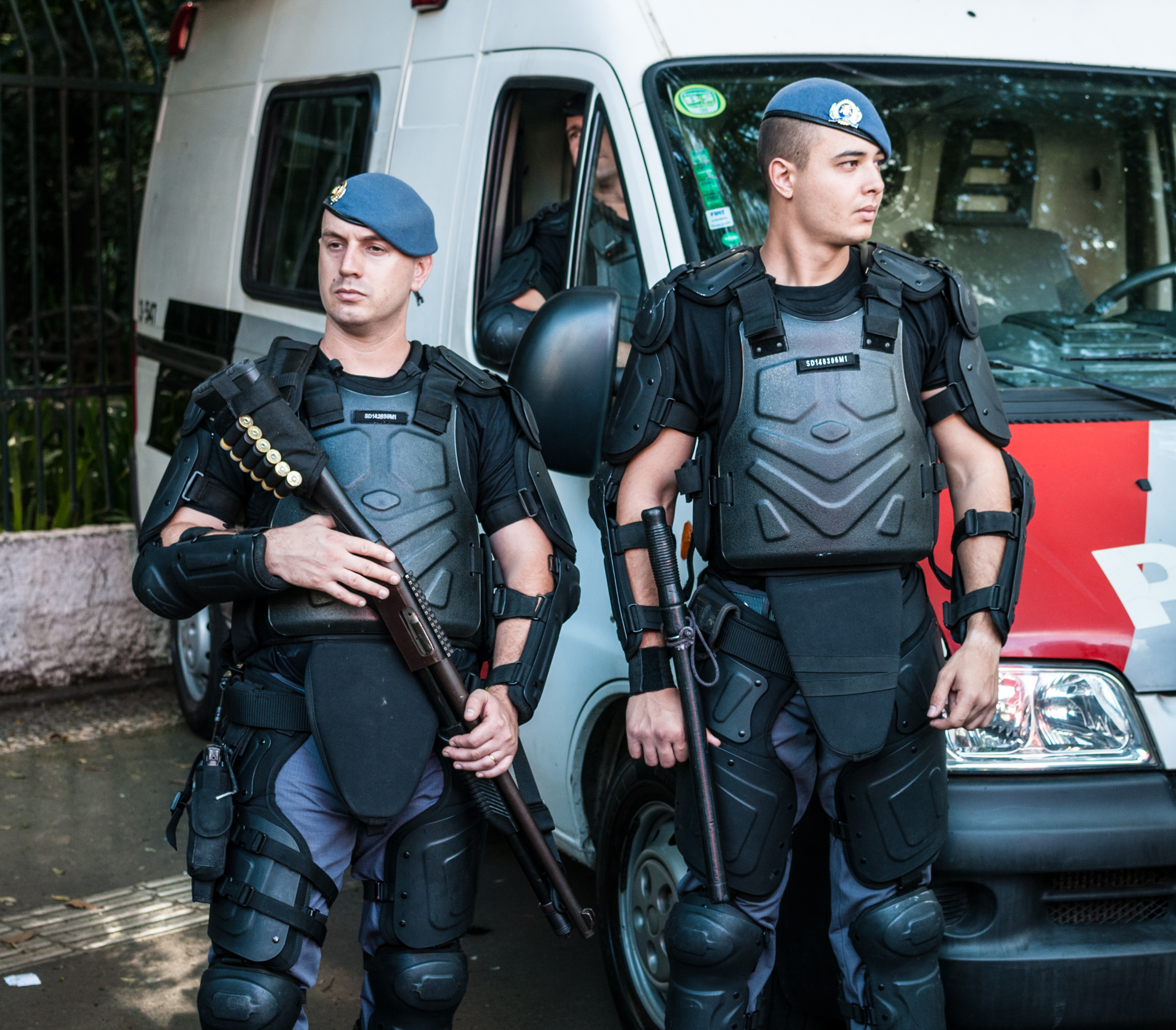
São Paulo Police officers in riot gear .

== Vehicles inventory ==
Model	Type	Notes	Photo
Chevrolet Corsa	Patrol car		
Chevrolet Classic	Patrol car		
Chevrolet Spin	Patrol car		
Chevrolet Prisma	Patrol car/Road Traffic		
Volkswagen Gol	Patrol car		
Blazer	Response car		
TrailBlazer	Response car		
Fiat Palio Weekend	Patrol car	Vehicle standard	
Hilux SW4	Response car		
Mitsubishi L200	Response car		
Volkswagen SpaceFox	Patrol car		
Volkswagen Parati	Patrol car		
Volkswagen Kombi	Police van		
Volkswagen Truck	Police truck		

== Notable officers ==
Conte Lopes, now a political representative, was a commanding officer (ranked as captain) behind the famous ROTA units in the 1970s and 1980s.

Cel. Ubiratan Guimarães, the commanding officer of the police operation resulting in the Carandiru massacre, was a high-ranked officer in the PMESP ranks (ranked as colonel).

== See also ==
- Museum of the Military Police of the State of São Paulo
- Rondas Ostensivas Tobias de Aguiar - 1st Shock Police Battalion, PMESP's elite ostensive patrol unit
- Comandos e Operações Especiais - 1st, 2nd and 3rd Companies of the 4th Shock Police Battalion, PMESP's counter-terrorism unit
- Grupo de Ações Táticas Especiais - 4th, 5th and 6th Companies of the 4th Shock Police Battalion, PMESP's hostage rescue unit
- Bandeirante Militia
