= Estação Carandiru =

1999 novel-memoir by Drauzio Varella

Carandiru Station
- Author: Drauzio Varella
- Original title: Estação Carandiru
- Cover artist: Hélio de Almeida
- Language: Portuguese
- Subject: Human and Social Sciences, Sociology
- Set in: Carandiru Penitentiary
- Publisher: Companhia das Letras
- Publication date: 1999
- Publication place: Brazil
- Media type: Print (paperback)
- Pages: 297 (first edition)
- Awards: Prêmio Jabuti for Non-fiction Book of the Year (2000)
- ISBN: 978-8-571-64897-5

Estação Carandiru ("Carandiru Station") is a 1999 novel-memoir by Brazilian physician and AIDS specialist Drauzio Varella. The story is based on Varella's time as a physician volunteering at Carandiru Penitentiary in São Paulo from 1989 up to the 1992 massacre which left 111 inmates dead, but is made up of fictionalized incidents and characters.

With more than 500,000 copies sold, Estação Carandiru is one of the all-time best-sellers in Brazil and was adapted into the 2003 film Carandiru directed by Héctor Babenco. Varella is portrayed by Luiz Carlos Vasconcelos in the film. The book won the Brazilian literary award Prêmio Jabuti in 2000.

The book, first in a trilogy, was followed by Carcereiros ("Jailers") in 2012 which chronicles prison life based on testimony of prison officials. Prisioneiras ("[Female] Prisoners"), about the women's prison in São Paulo, will end the trilogy.
