= Drauzio Varella =

Brazilian physician and writer (born 1943)

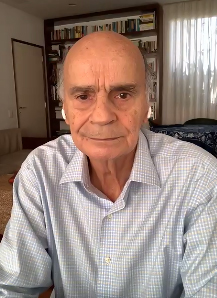
- Born: Antônio Drauzio Varella; May 3, 1943 (age 83); São Paulo, São Paulo, Brazil
- Education: University of São Paulo
- Occupations: Physician, writer, science communicator
- Years active: 1970–present
- Known for: Literary and popular science writing
- Medical career
- Field: Oncology, immunology
- Institutions: Instituto de Assistência Médica ao Servidor Público Estadual
- Research: Cancer and AIDS
- Notable works: Estação Carandiru
- Awards: Prêmio Jabuti (2000)
- Website: drauziovarella.uol.com.br

Antônio Drauzio Varella (Portuguese: [ˈdɾawzju vaˈɾɛlɐ]; born May 3, 1943, in São Paulo, Brazil) is a Brazilian physician, scientist, writer, and medical science communicator. Varella has often commented publicly on issues such as prison conditions, social welfare, government, literature, medicine, and skepticism, and has frequently debunked pseudoscientific medical claims. Varella received the 2000 Prêmio Jabuti for his book Estação Carandiru.

== Early life and education ==
Varella was born in the Brás district of São Paulo to a family of Portuguese and Spanish descent and studied medicine at the University of São Paulo. While an undergraduate, he co-founded test preparation school Sistema Objetivo, where he taught chemistry for several years. The institution was later expanded into Universidade Paulista.

== Career ==
After his 1967 graduation, Varella specialized in infectious disease, studying under Vicente Amato Neto at the University of São Paulo and at the Hospital do Servidor Público de São Paulo. This work led him to develop an interest in immunology. Varella interned at MD Anderson in 1978, and has worked at Hospital do Câncer, specializing in oncology.

He is a professor at Universidade Paulista and has taught at other institutions in Brazil and abroad, such as the Memorial Sloan Kettering Cancer Center, Cleveland Clinic, Karolinska Institute, Hiroshima University and the National Cancer Center of Japan. Varella has often studied AIDS, specifically the treatment of Kaposi's sarcoma.

Varella has had an active role in prevention and educational campaigns about AIDS, and was the first one to host a radio program on the subject. From 1989 to 2001, he worked as an unpaid volunteer physician in Carandiru Penitentiary, working to alleviate an AIDS epidemic among inmates. He wrote the best-seller book Estação Carandiru chronicling this experience; it was later adapted into the film Carandiru, by Hector Babenco. The book has been described as a quasi-ethnographical study of the prison.

As the chairman of a cancer research institute at Universidade Paulista, Varella has headed a research program on the utility of medicinal plants native to the Amazon rainforest in the treatment neoplasm and antibiotic-resistant bacteria. This research is supported by the São Paulo Research Support Foundation.

== Writing ==
Varella is active in furthering the public understanding of science, particularly regarding medical topics. He has been a columnist for Brazilian newspapers such as Folha de S. Paulo and Zero Hora and was invited by the Globo TV Network to host a series of programs on the human body, the brain, first aid, smoking,pregnancy, obesity and others, which were exhibited at the Fantástico show on Sundays. He is also the producer and host of a TV talk show on medicine and health, which is broadcast on several TV channels.

For his work as a writer, Varella received several prizes and awards, among them the Prêmio Jabuti from the Brazilian Book Chamber, the International Book Fair of Bologna, Bologna, Italy, and The International Book Biennal of Rio de Janeiro (2001).

He has also written fiction for adults and children and has often been a vocal supporter of scientific skepticism.

On 12 November 2026, Varella was elected to occupy the Chair number 32 at the Brazilian Academy of Letters, in succession to Zuenir Ventura.

== Controversy ==
In 2020, Varella was criticized after being featured in a documentary aired on Fantástico reporting on the life of trans women incarcerated in male prisons, in which he hugged an inmate who been convicted for the rape and murder of a 9-year-old child. He later apologized, stating that he did not know what crime she had committed, and that he avoids learning this information to prevent bias when treating patients.

== Personal life ==
Varella has been married to actress Regina Braga since 1981, and has fathered two daughters. He is an atheist.

== Works ==
- Carcereiros (2012)
- Prisioneiras
- AIDS Hoje. In 3 volumes, in collaboration with Antonio Fernando Varella and Narciso Escaleira.
- Estação Carandiru (1999), Companhia das Letras.
- Macacos, Publifolha ("Folha Explica" series)
- Nas ruas do Brás. Companhia das Letrinhas (children's book)
- De braços para o alto. Companhia das Letrinhas (children's book)
- Florestas do Rio Negro. With Alexandre Adalardo de Oliveira and Douglas C. Daly
- Maré - Vida na Favela
- Casa das Palavras, with Paola Berenstein, Ivaldo Bertazzo and Pedro Seiblitz (images).
- Por um fio. Companhia das Letras, 2004.
