= Grupo de Ações Táticas Especiais =

São Paulo police tactical unit

Special Tactical Actions Group
- Grupo de Ações Táticas Especiais
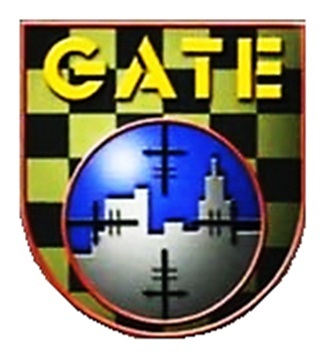
- Founded: 4 August 1988; 38 years ago
- Country: Brazil
- Allegiance: Shock Police Command
- Type: Police tactical unit
- Part of: São Paulo Military Police
- Headquarters: São Paulo, Brazil
- Nickname: GATE

The Grupo de Ações Táticas Especiais (Portuguese for Special Tactical Actions Group), mostly known by its acronym GATE, is a tier two police tactical unit of the Military Police of São Paulo State (PMESP) in Brazil. It is made up of the 4th, 5th and 6th Companies of the 4th Shock Police Battalion.

== Missions ==
The unit's missions primarily involve anti-irregular forces, apprehension of armed and dangerous criminals, counterinsurgency in jungle and urban terrains, defusing and disposal of bombs and unexploded ordnances, executive protection, high-risk tactical law enforcement situations, hostage rescue crisis management, operating in difficult to access terrains, protecting high-level meeting areas, providing security in areas at risk of terrorism, special reconnaissance in difficult to access and dangerous areas, support crowd control and riot control, and tactical urban counterterrorism.

== History ==
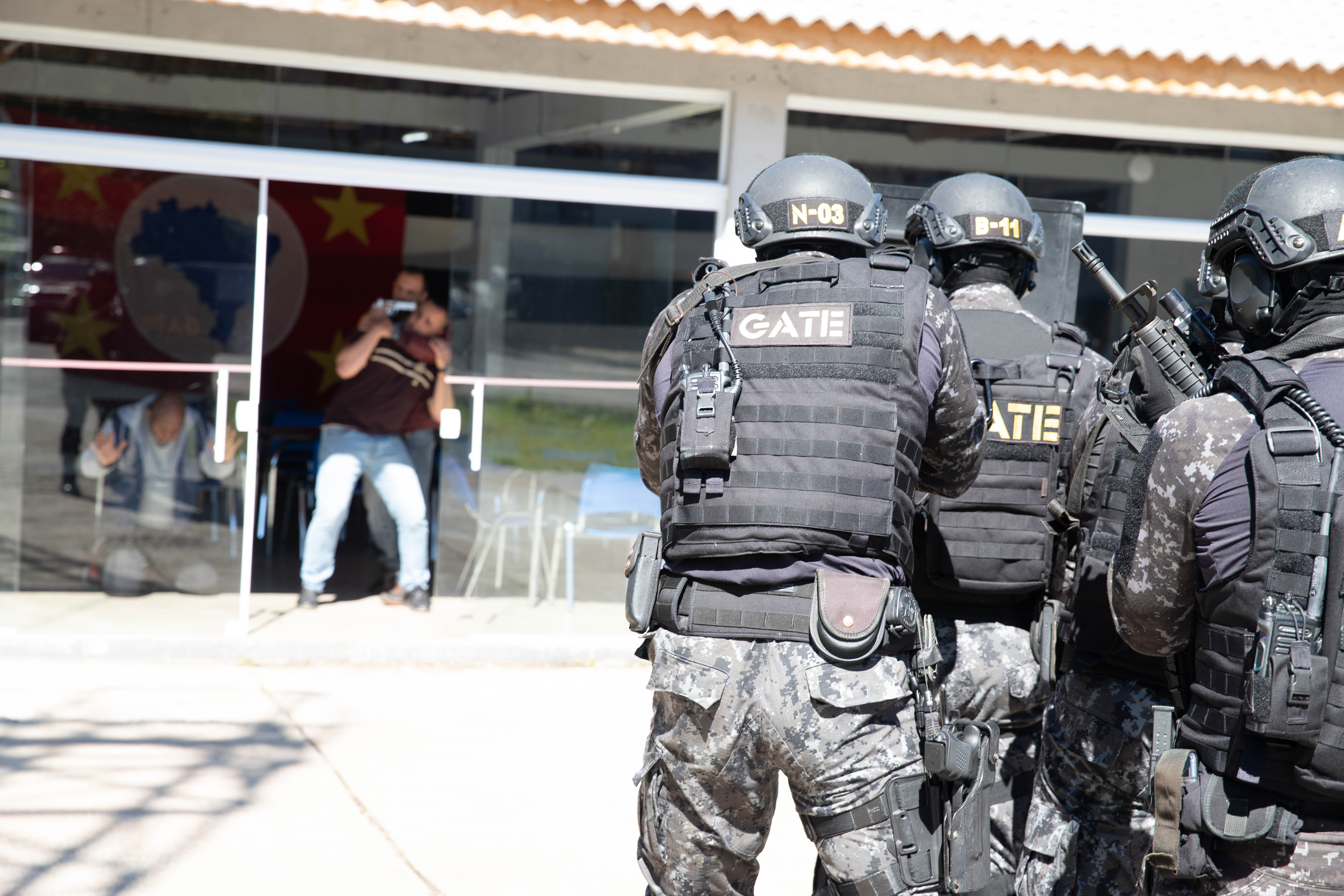
GATE officers in a 2019 training exercise.

GATE was created following a case on 18 February 1987, when former Instituto Tecnológico de Aeronáutica (ITA) students held a three-month old baby, Tabata, hostage for eight hours in Mogi das Cruzes. At around 6 p.m., the suspects were killed after a shootout and Tabata was rescued, sustaining knife wounds in the process. The case convinced the Military Police of the need to create a specially trained team for hostage rescue operations. The unit was declared operational on 4 August 1988.

GATE is subordinate to the 4th Shock Police Battalion, which in turn is subordinate to the Shock Police Command (CPChq). It was initially made up of former members of Rondas Ostensivas Tobias de Aguiar (ROTA). At the unit level it is commanded by a Major and is operationally divided into negotiation teams as well as a bomb squad, snipers teams, and tactical teams.

GATE's attributions are high-complexity law enforcement situations such as anti-irregular forces, apprehension of armed and dangerous criminals, bomb disposal, counterinsurgency in jungle and urban terrains, executive protection, hostage rescue crisis management, protecting high-level meeting areas, and tactical urban counterterrorism.

== Doctrine ==
GATE modeled its operational performance after American police Special Weapons and Tactics (SWAT) groups. Later complemented its doctrine after Europeans police tactical unit groups like, German Federal Police GSG 9 and the French National Gendarmerie Intervention Group (GIGN).

=== Selection ===
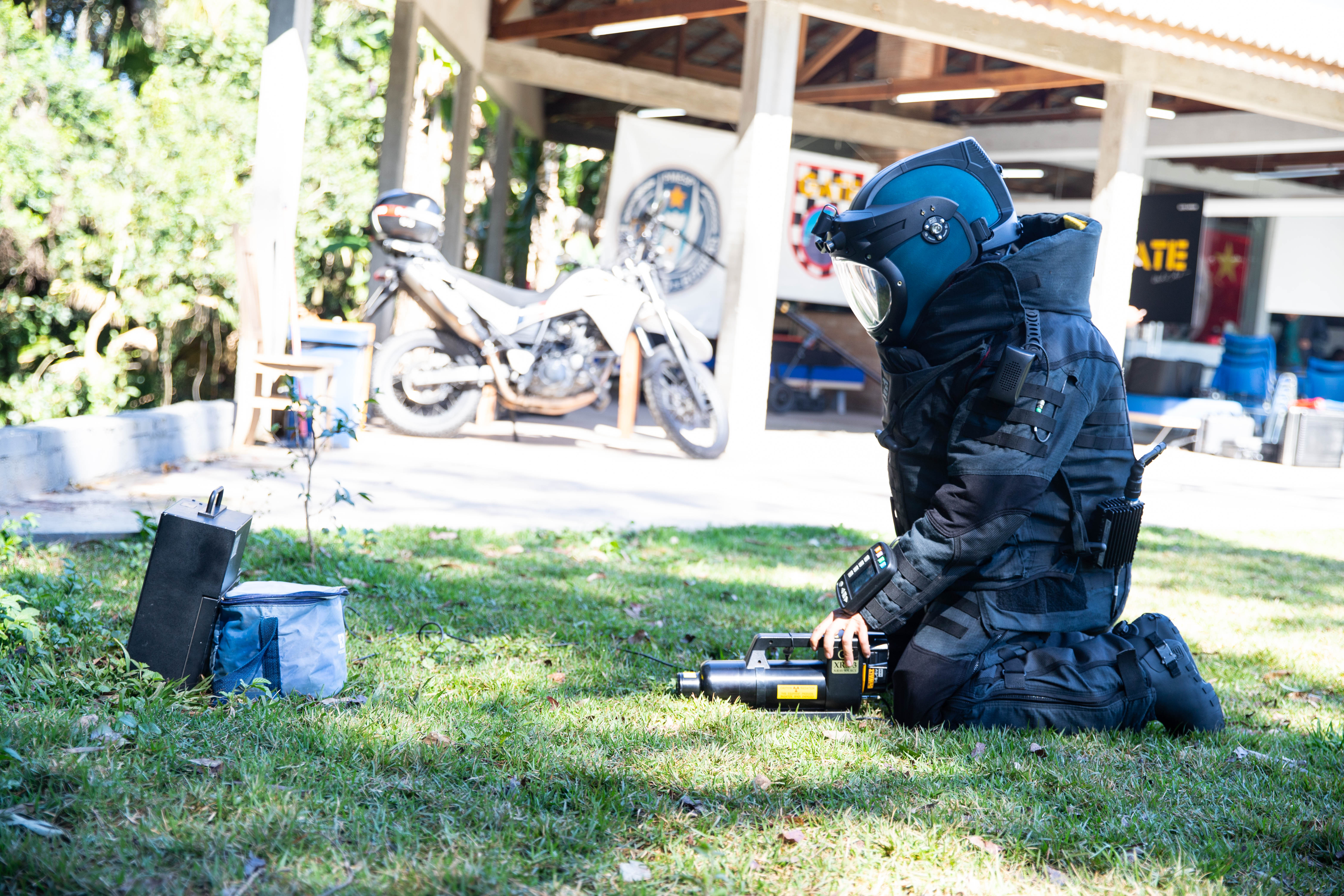
Bomb disposal training.

Currently, enrollment in GATE is given upon completion of the course of Special Tactical Actions, lasting 6 weeks.

== See also ==
- Rondas Ostensivas Tobias de Aguiar - PMESP's elite ostensive patrols unit
- Comandos e Operações Especiais - PMESP's special operations unit
