= Comandos e Operações Especiais =

São Paulo police tactical unit

The 1st, 2nd and 3rd Companies of the 4th Shock Police Battalion of the São Paulo State Military Police make up the Commandos and Special Operations unit, responsible for operating in high-risk and high-complexity environments that require specialized training and equipment. Originally intended to operate in rural, jungle and mountainous areas, the nature of areas such as São Paulo's coast led to the unit's attributions being later extended to include operations in complex urban environments (such as favelas), mangroves and diving.

The unit, along with GATE (comprising the 4th, 5th and 6th Companies of the 4th Shock Police Battalion and responsible for hostage rescue operations and Counter-terrorism), make up PMESP's Special Operations battalion, akin to a SWAT division.

== See also ==
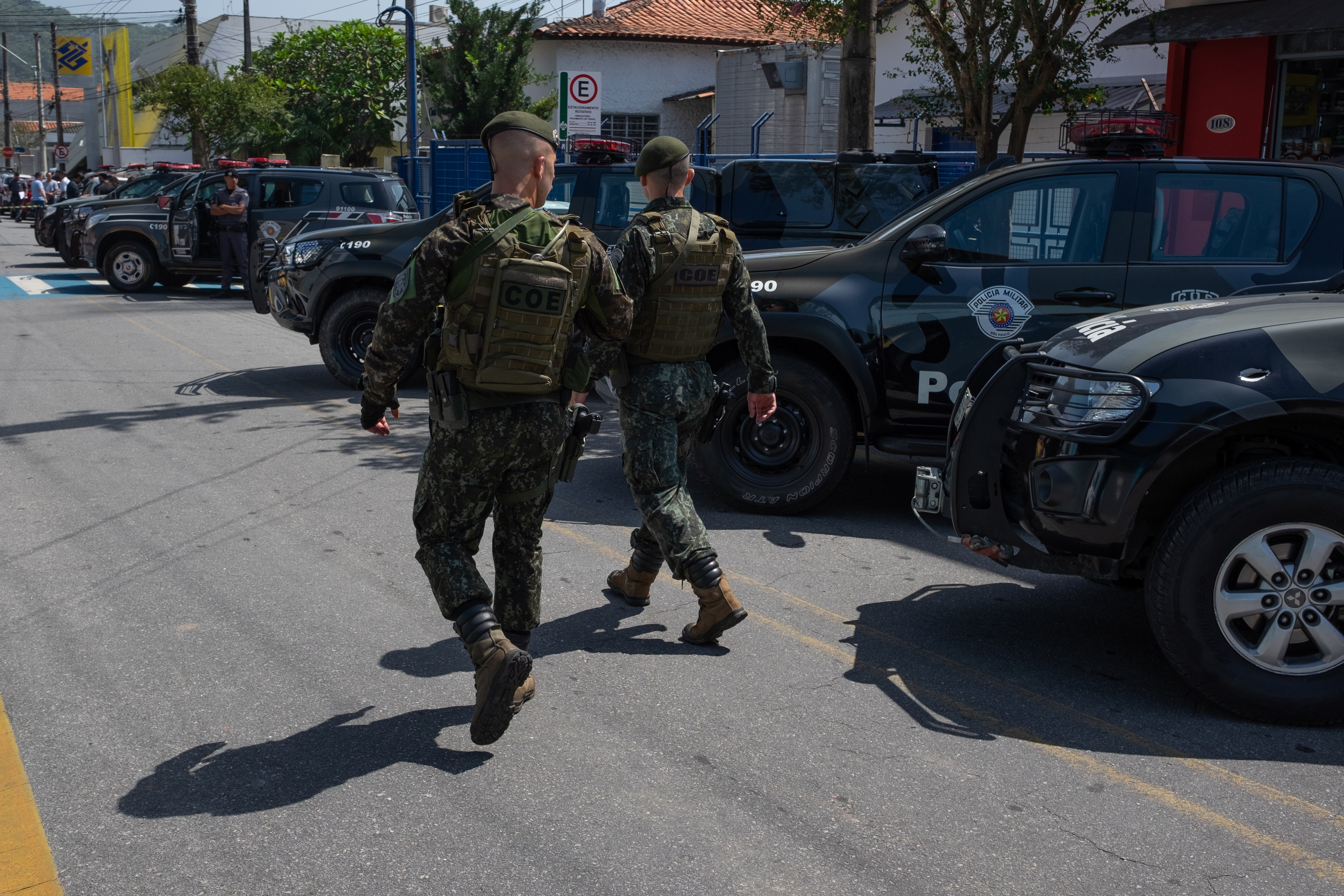
COE officers responding to a bank robbery attempt in Guararema.

- Rondas Ostensivas Tobias de Aguiar - PMESP's elite ostensive patrols unit
- Grupo de Ações Táticas Especiais - PMESP's hostage rescue tactical unit
