= Ubiratan Guimarães =

Brazilian police officer (1943–2006)

Colonel Ubiratan Guimarães
- Born: April 19, 1943; São Paulo, Brazil
- Died: September 9, 2006 (aged 63); São Paulo, Brazil
- Cause of death: Shot in abdomen
- Other name: Colonel Ubiratan
- Occupations: Police officer, politician
- Employer: São Paulo Military Police
- Known for: Carandiru massacre, state representative of São Paulo
- Political party: PSD

Ubiratan Guimarães, known as Colonel Ubiratan (April 19, 1943 – September 9, 2006) was a colonel in the São Paulo Military Police and Brazilian politician. He was the commanding officer responsible for the Carandiru massacre. Guimarães was killed under unclear circumstances in his São Paulo apartment in 2006.

== Colonel ==
Guimarães joined the state military police at the age 18 and rose to the rank of colonel, the top hierarchy in the São Paulo Military Police. As a colonel in the military police, where he stayed for 34 years, he commanded the Polícia Militar do Estado de São Paulo and São Paulo metropolitan police. In the 1970s, during the military dictatorship of Brazil, he fought guerrillas in the Vale do Ribeira, São Paulo.

== 1992 Carandiru massacre ==
Guimarães was the high-ranking police officer commanding the São Paulo military police in the infamous Carandiru prison massacre. He repeated that he had a "clear conscience" and always defended the operation, saying the order to invade the cellblock was meant to save lives as he feared that a fire set by inmates could spread. Guimarães was originally charged with 111 counts of murder in June 2001, but the number was later reduced to 102 as there was no evidence police had killed the nine prisoners found stabbed to death. He was initially sentenced to 632 years in prison (six years each for the victims and 20 years for five attempted murders) for his mishandling of the rebellion and subsequent massacre. On 16 February 2006 the conviction was voided by a São Paulo court by 20 votes to two because of mistrial claims; the court accepted his argument that he was only following orders. Human rights groups around the world, such as Amnesty International, denounced the reversal. Primeiro Comando da Capital (PCC), one of Brazil's most notorious gangs, is said to have been formed as a response to the event.

== Political life ==
Guimarães entered politics after the massacre, when his name had become known to the general public. He was twice sworn in as a substitute state representative by center-right Brazilian Social Democratic Party: in January 1997 to April 1998 and from January to March 1999. In 2002 he was re-elected (with number 14 111) state representative for São Paulo with 56,155 votes.

As a Member of Parliament, the retired colonel made public safety his main banner. Guimarães was against the disarming of the population and in favor of stricter rules for detainees, such as the ending of conjugal visits and furloughs.

== Death ==
On Saturday night September 9, 2006 Guimarães was killed by a shot in his abdomen from a .38 caliber weapon. At around 22:30 the following day he was found in his São Paulo apartment in the neighborhood Jardins. The corpse showed no signs of struggle, and the door was left ajar. The body was lying on its back, covered only by a towel.

The governor of São Paulo, Cláudio Lembo (PFL), ruled out the possible involvement of organized crime in the murder.

His body was buried on the afternoon of September 11 in the Horto Florestal cemetery in northern São Paulo. The procession was scheduled to end in the chapel, but this was canceled due to the sheer number of people who followed the ceremony.

The phrase "aqui se faz, aqui se paga" (what goes around, comes around) was sprayed in pichação (a local form of graffiti) on the building where he lived — a reference to the Carandiru massacre.

== See also ==
- List of unsolved murders (2000–present)
