= Military ranks of Brazil =

The military ranks of Brazil are the military insignia used by the Brazilian Armed Forces. The insignia and ranks of the Brazilian military are defined by Act no. 6880 of December 9, 1980.

Air Force ranks date from 1941, when the Brazilian Air Force was organized as a merger of the Navy's Aeronaval Force and the Army's Aviation Service.

== Commissioned officer ranks ==
The rank insignia of commissioned officers.

The shoulder epaulette pads from Navy and Air Force indicate both rank and specialty branch. The air force examples below are shown without branch designation marks on the epaulettes, with the exception of the ranks of Marshal of the Air Force and Air Chief Marshal, which can only be occupied by aviators. Army shoulder pads do not represent branch, as this is indicated elsewhere in the uniform like on the cuff and sleeves of the dress and everyday uniforms.

The Military Police alongside the Military Firefighters Corps are classed as an auxiliary and reserve forces of the Army and thus carry insignia similar to that service. Another important point to mention is that police forces are subordinate to the governors of their respective states. As a result, the structure of their insignias follows that of the Brazilian Army. However, each state has its own legislation, regulations regarding insignias, uniforms, historical uniforms, and teaching academies for both NCOs and COs.

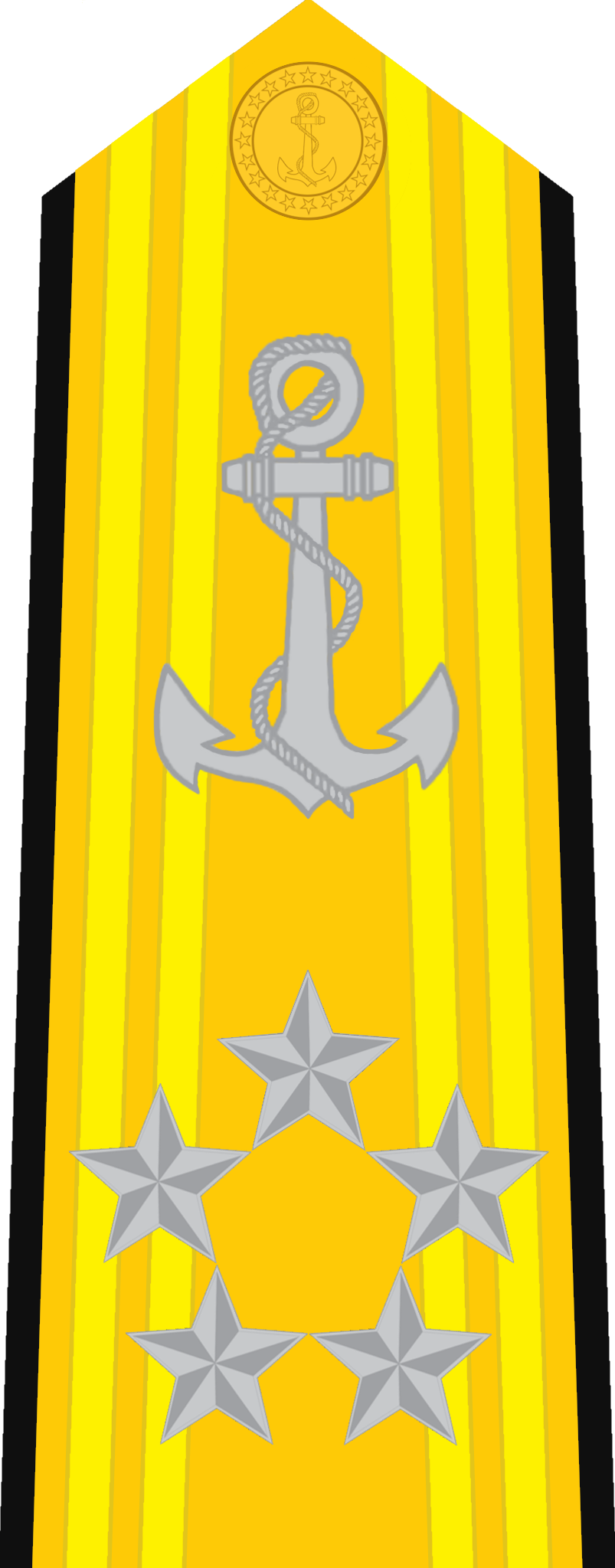
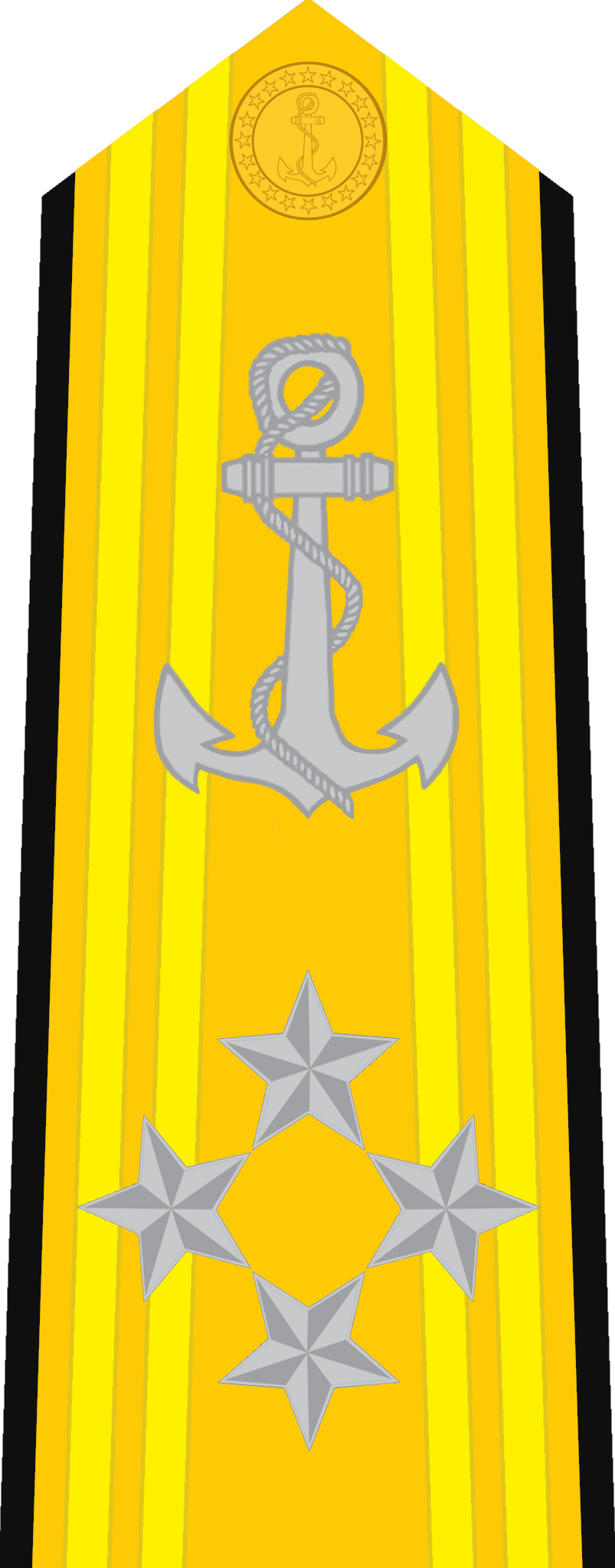
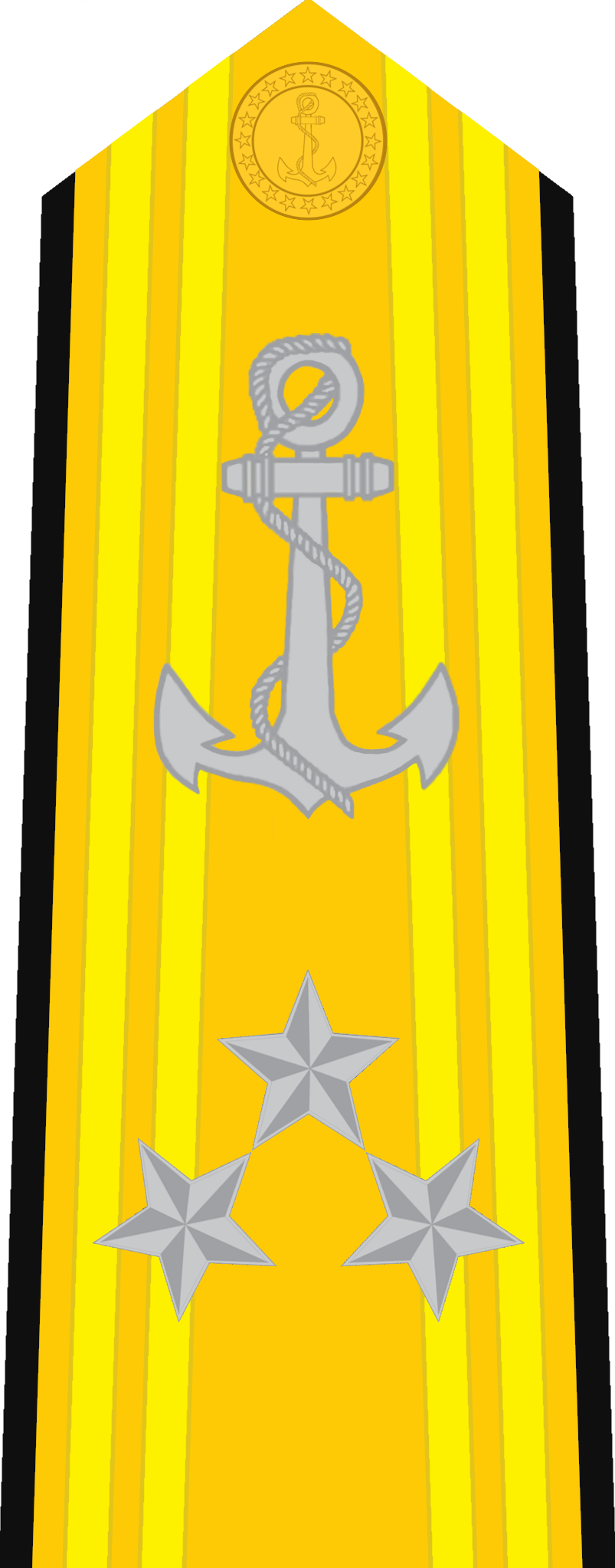
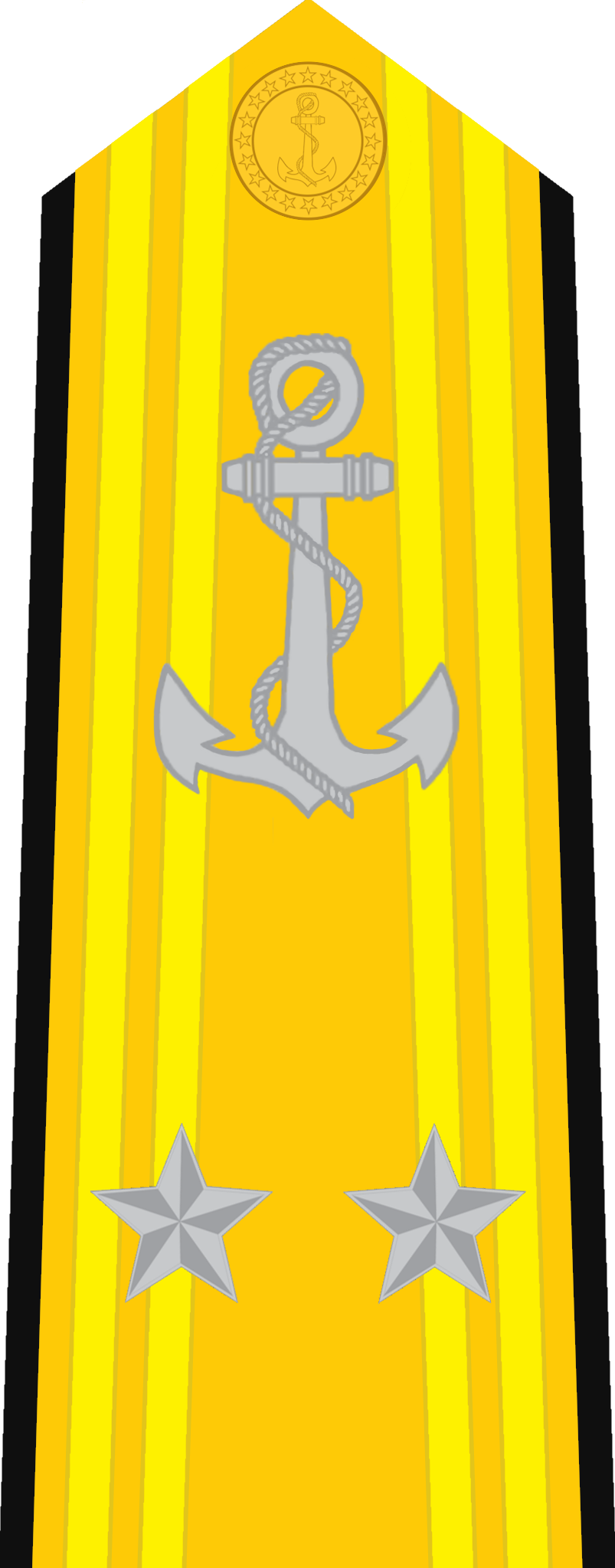
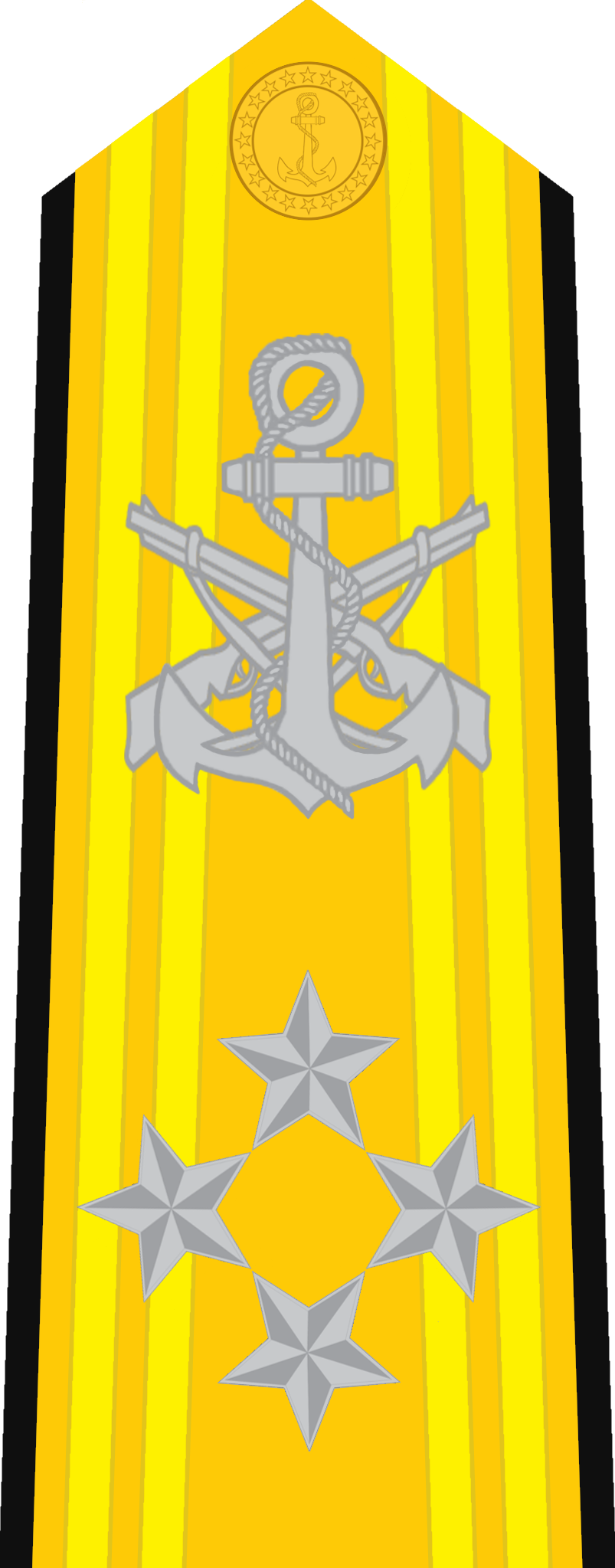
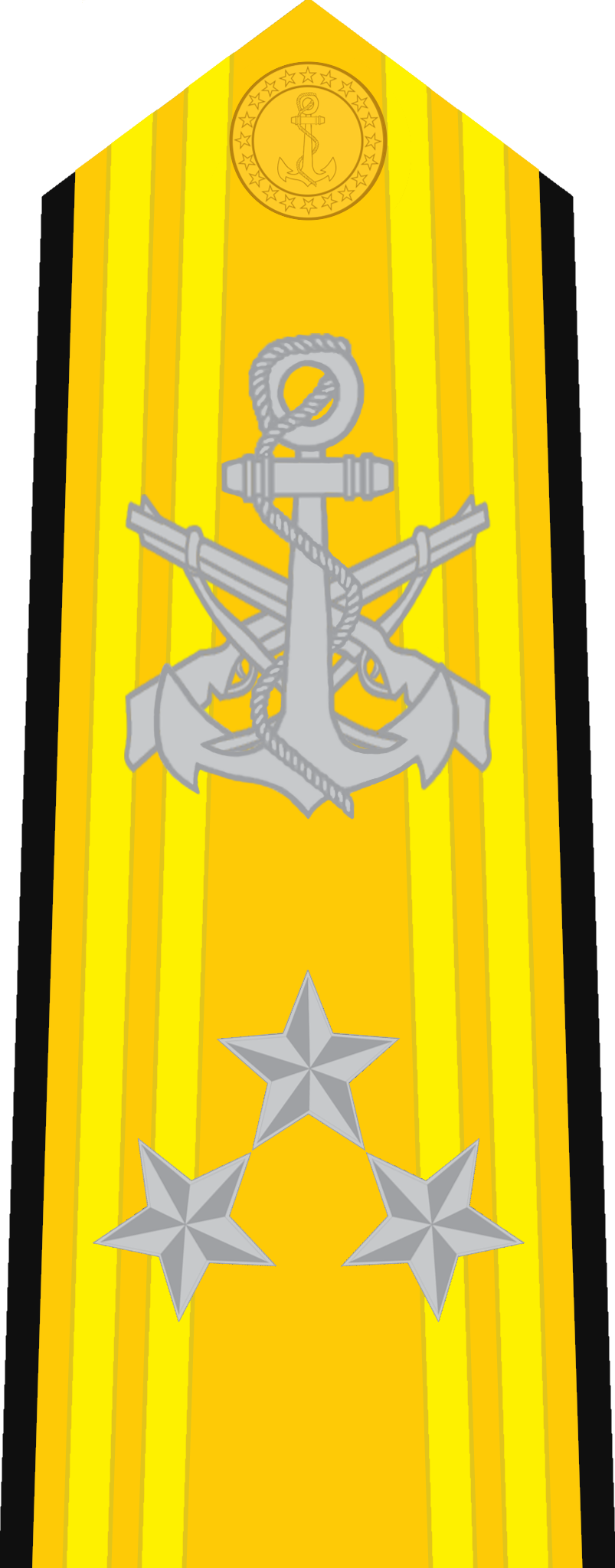
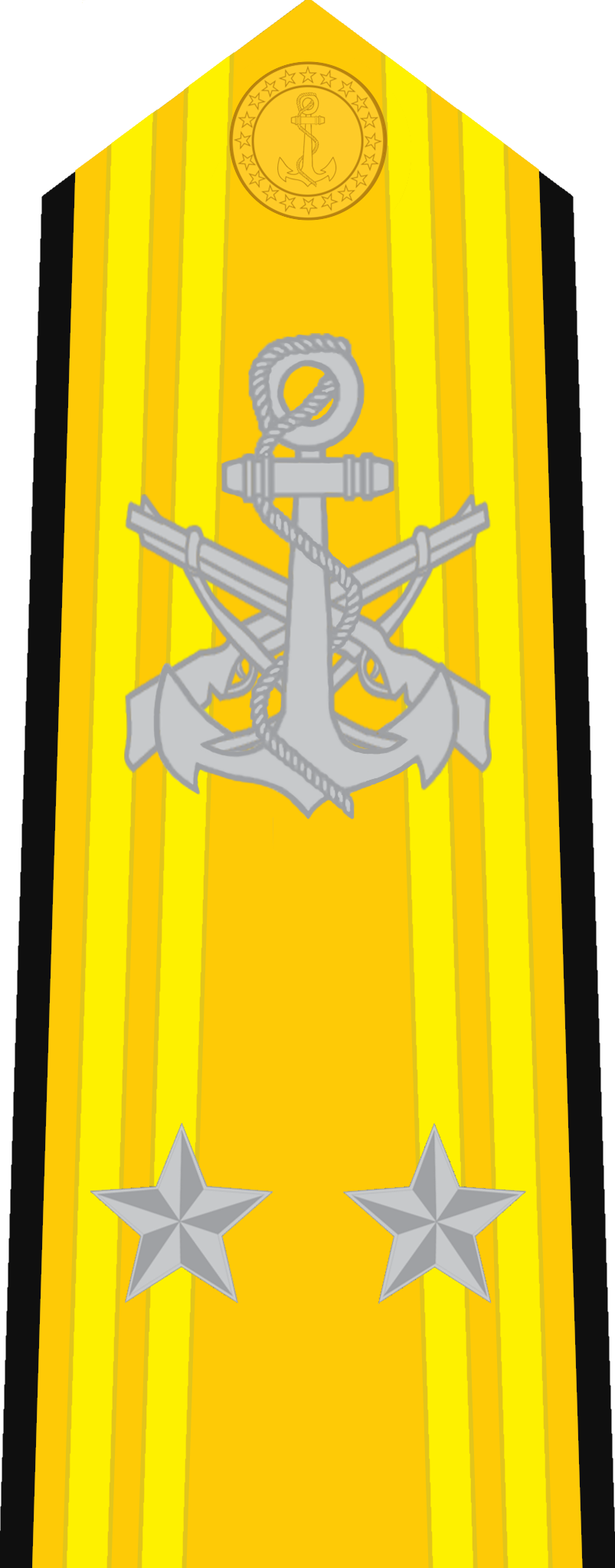
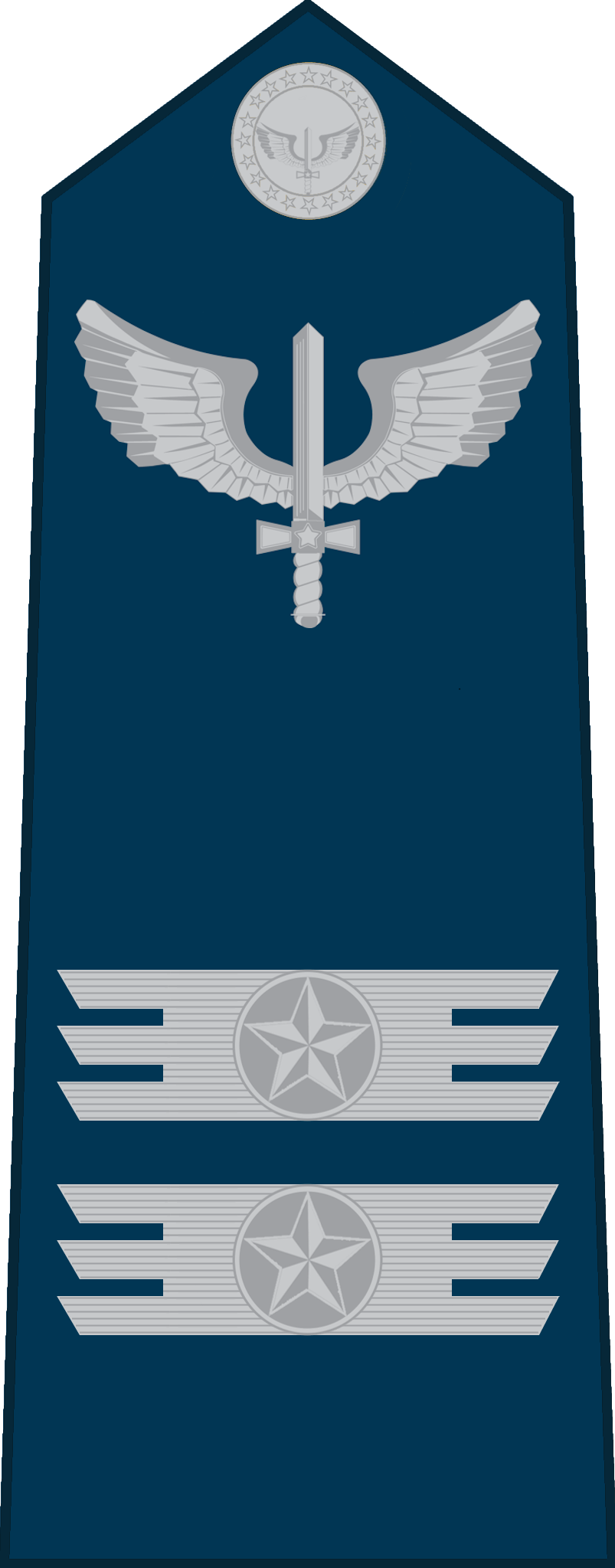
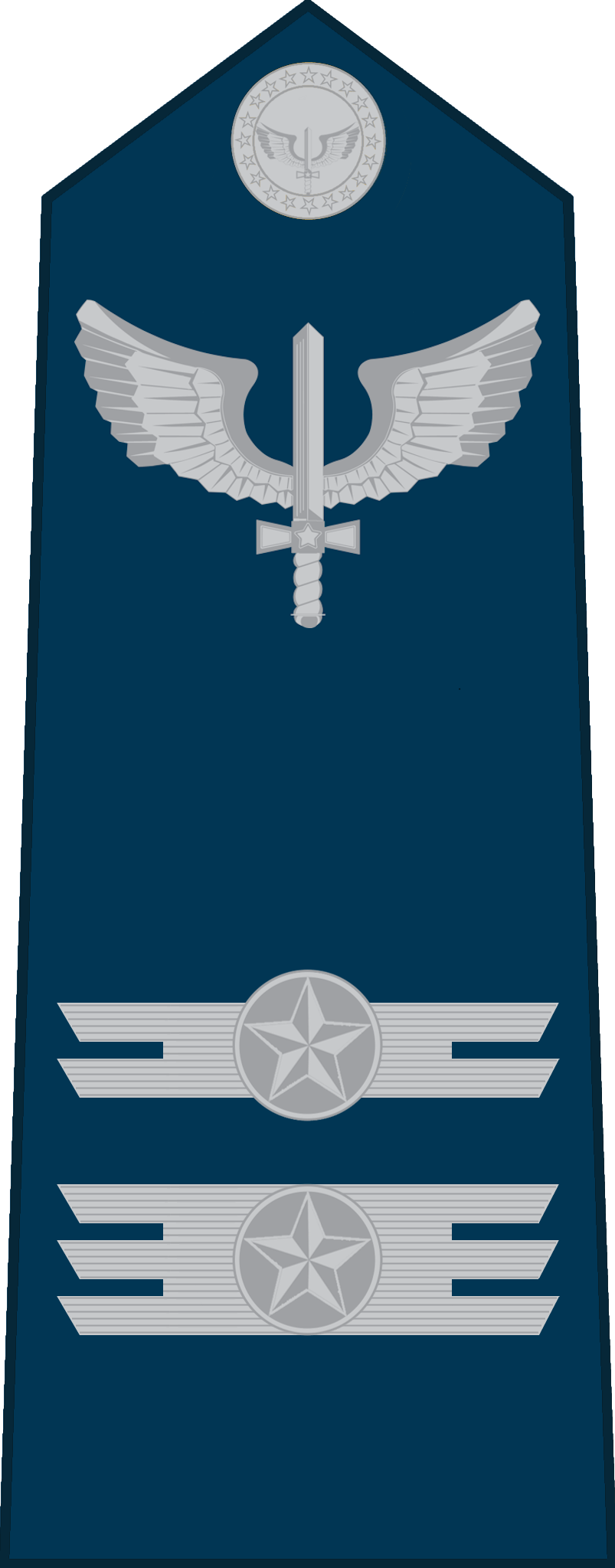
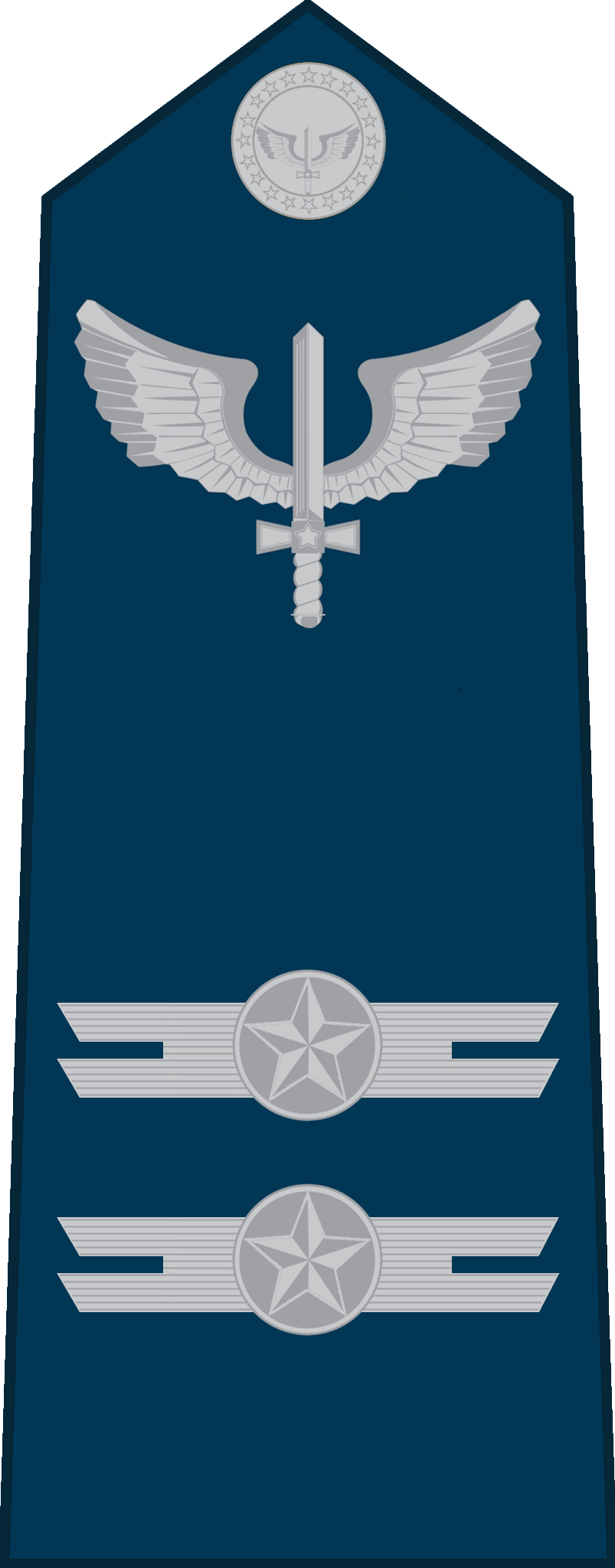
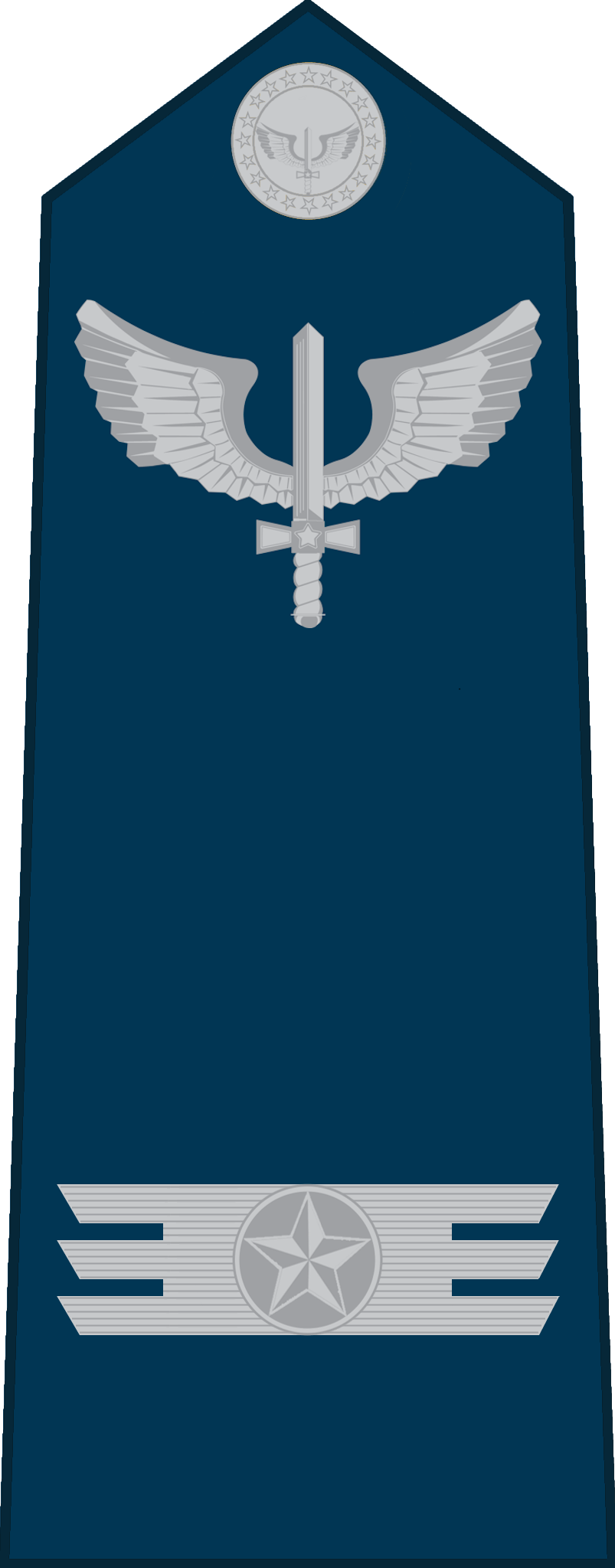
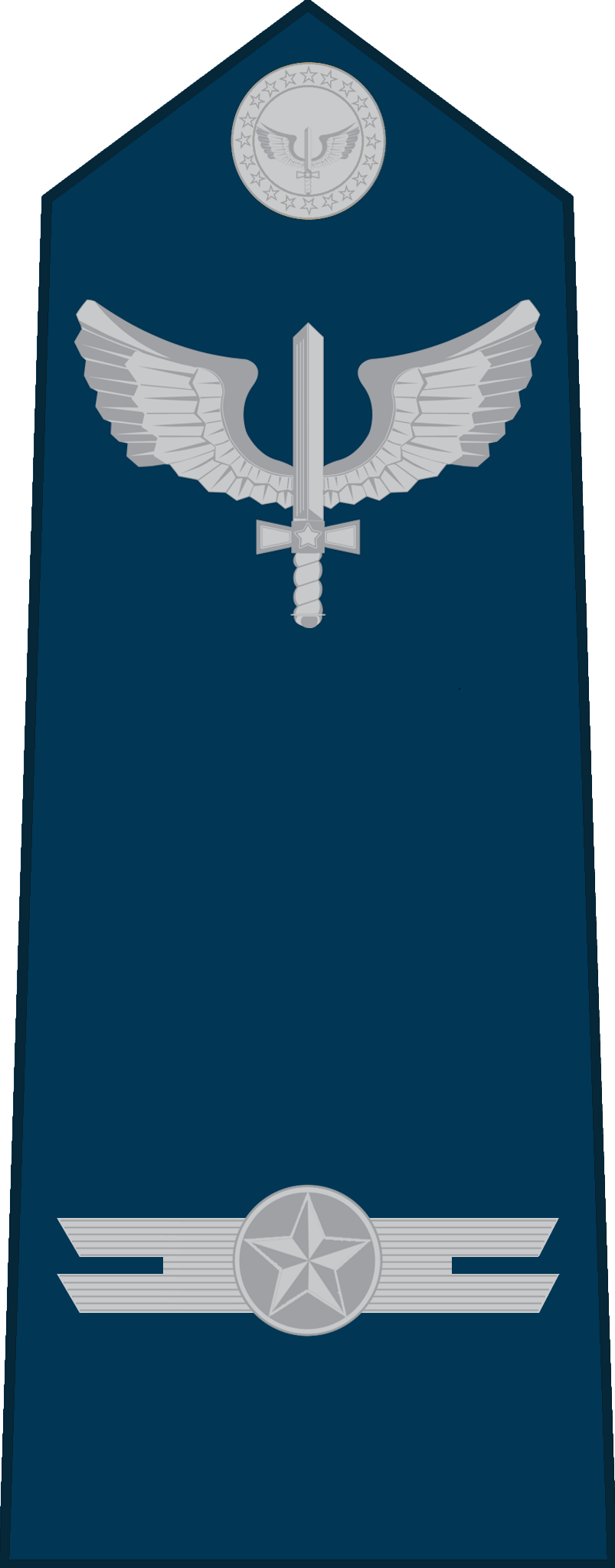
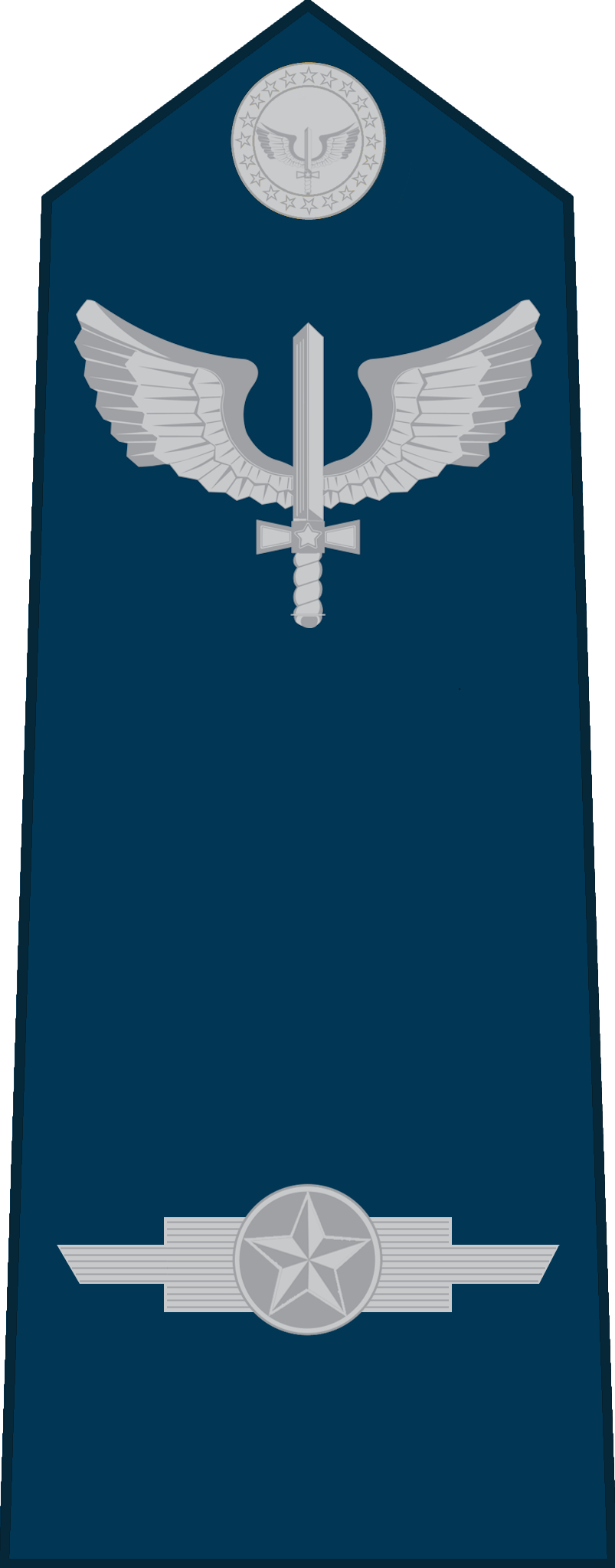
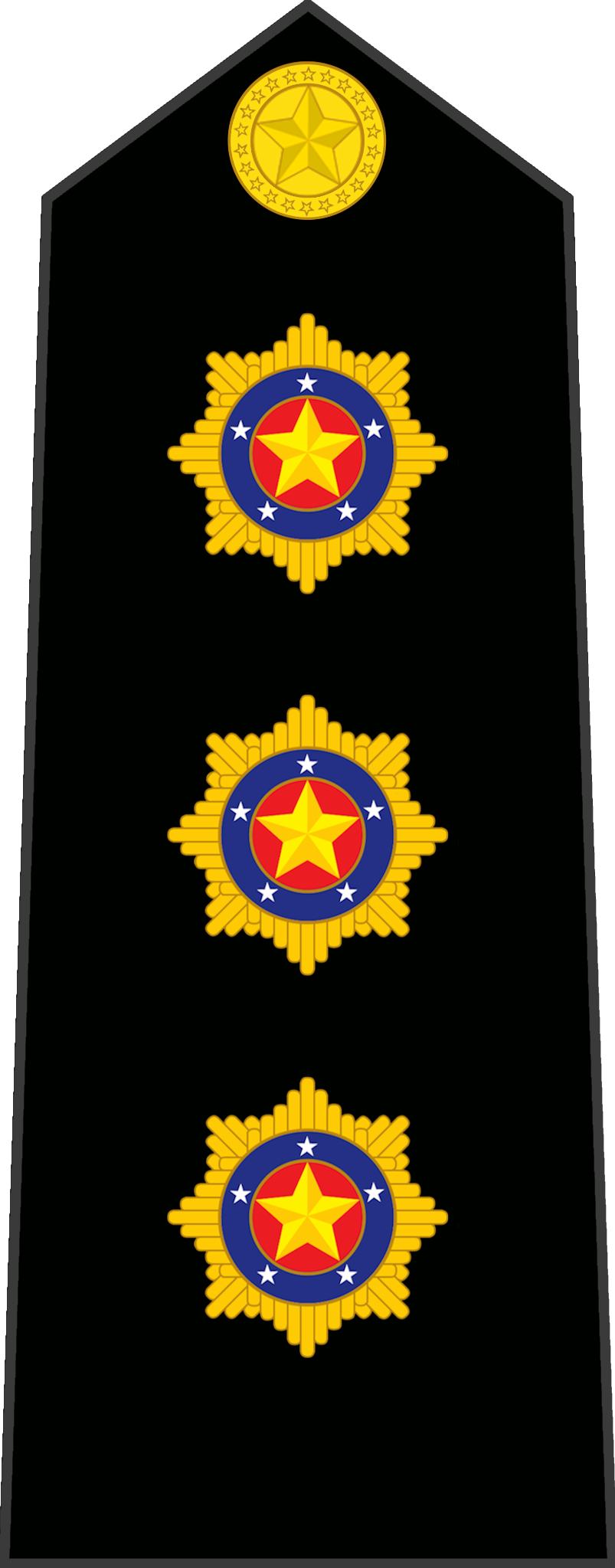
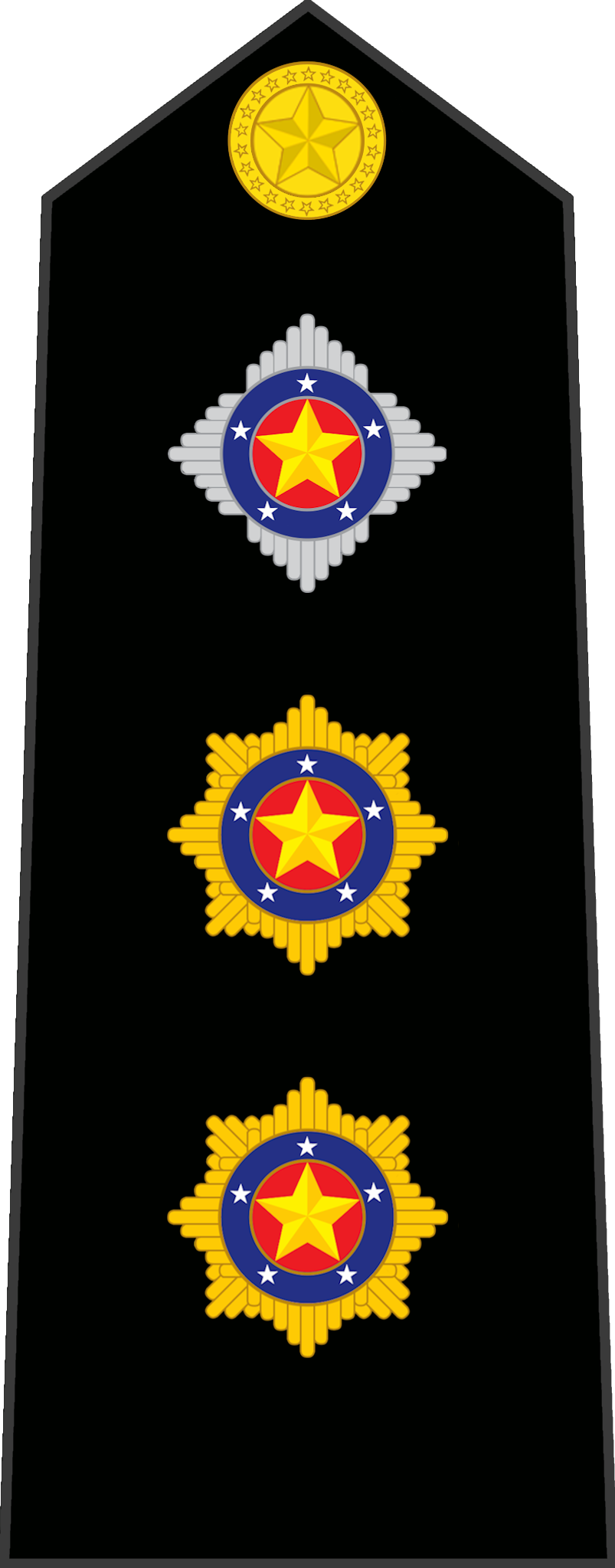
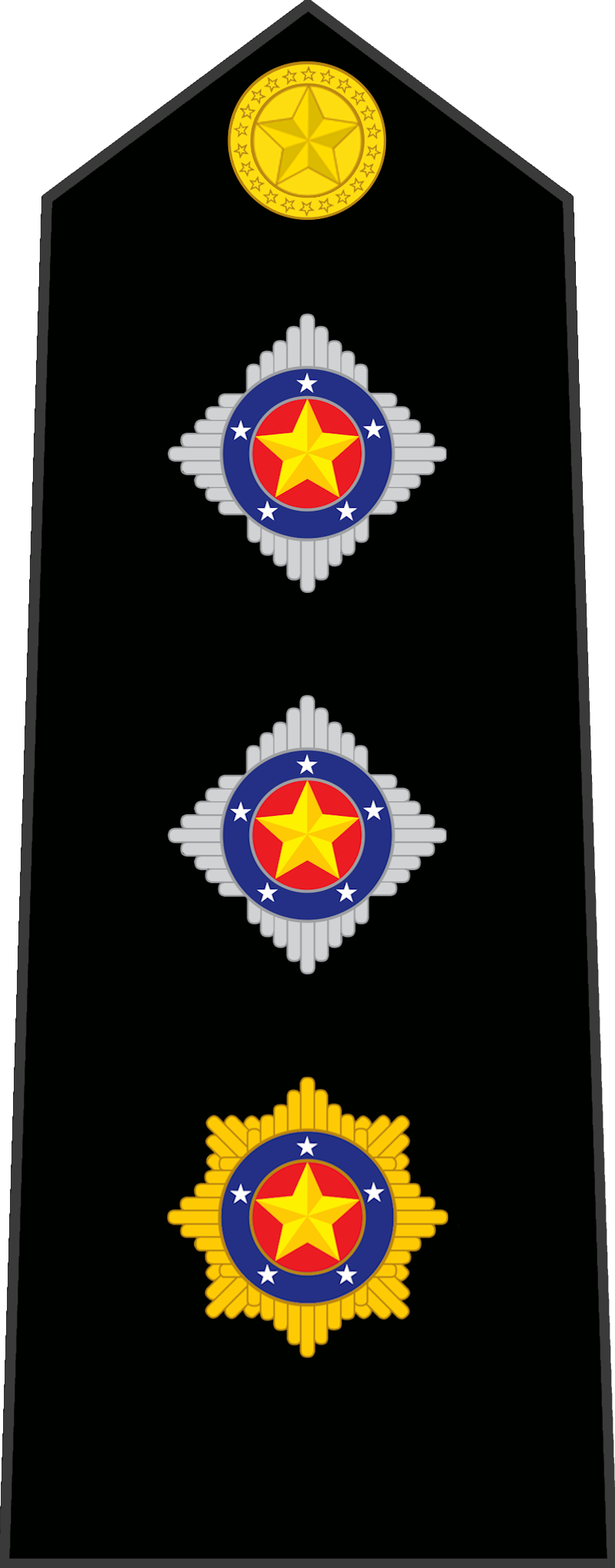
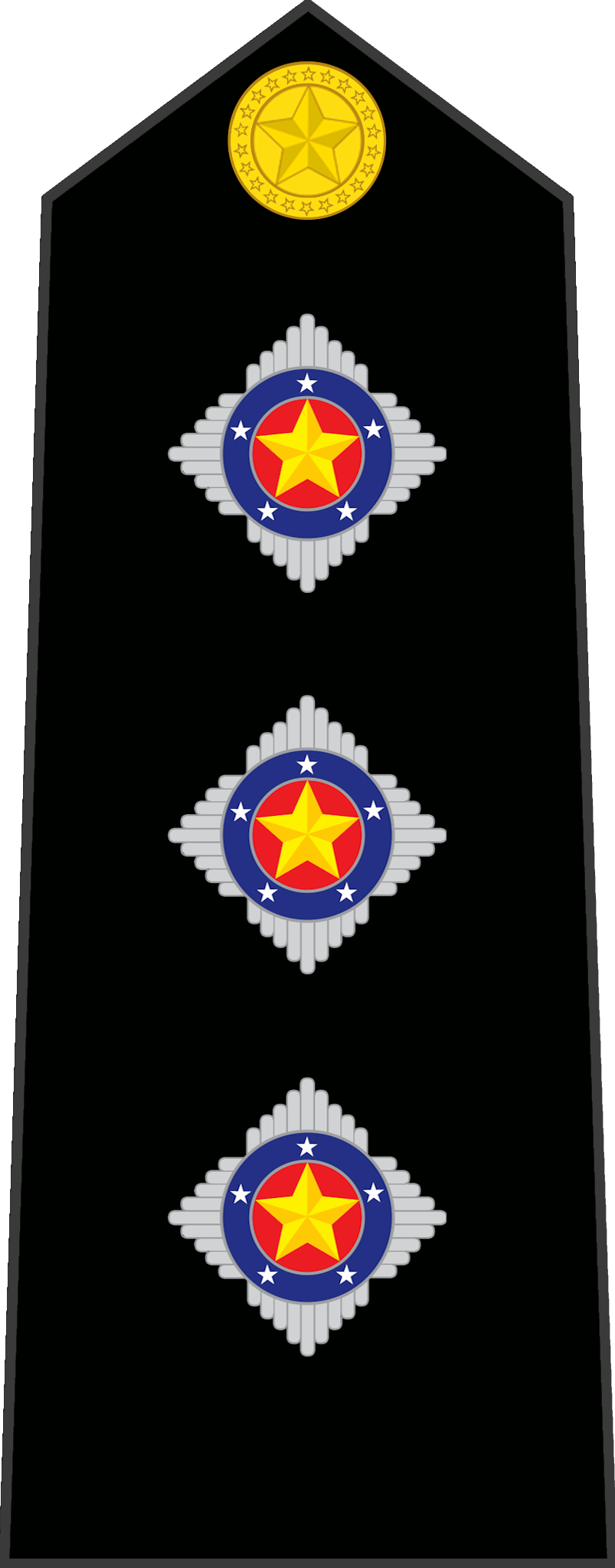
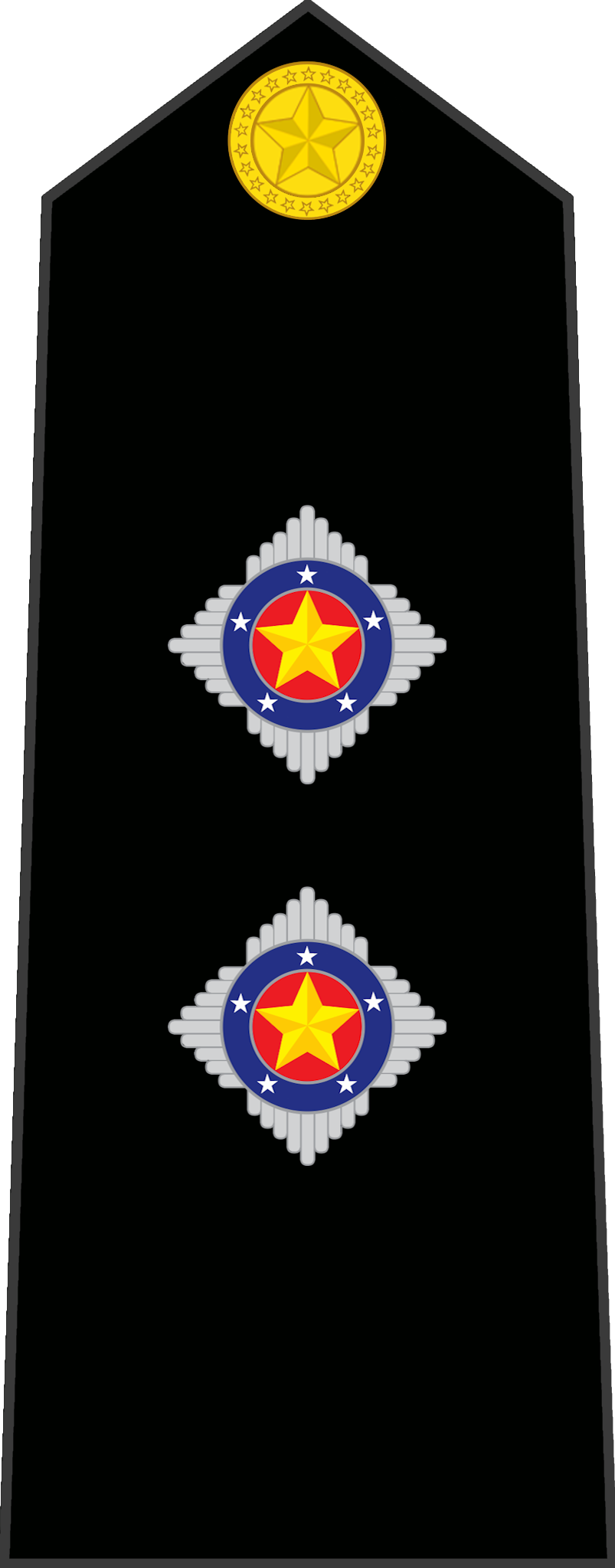
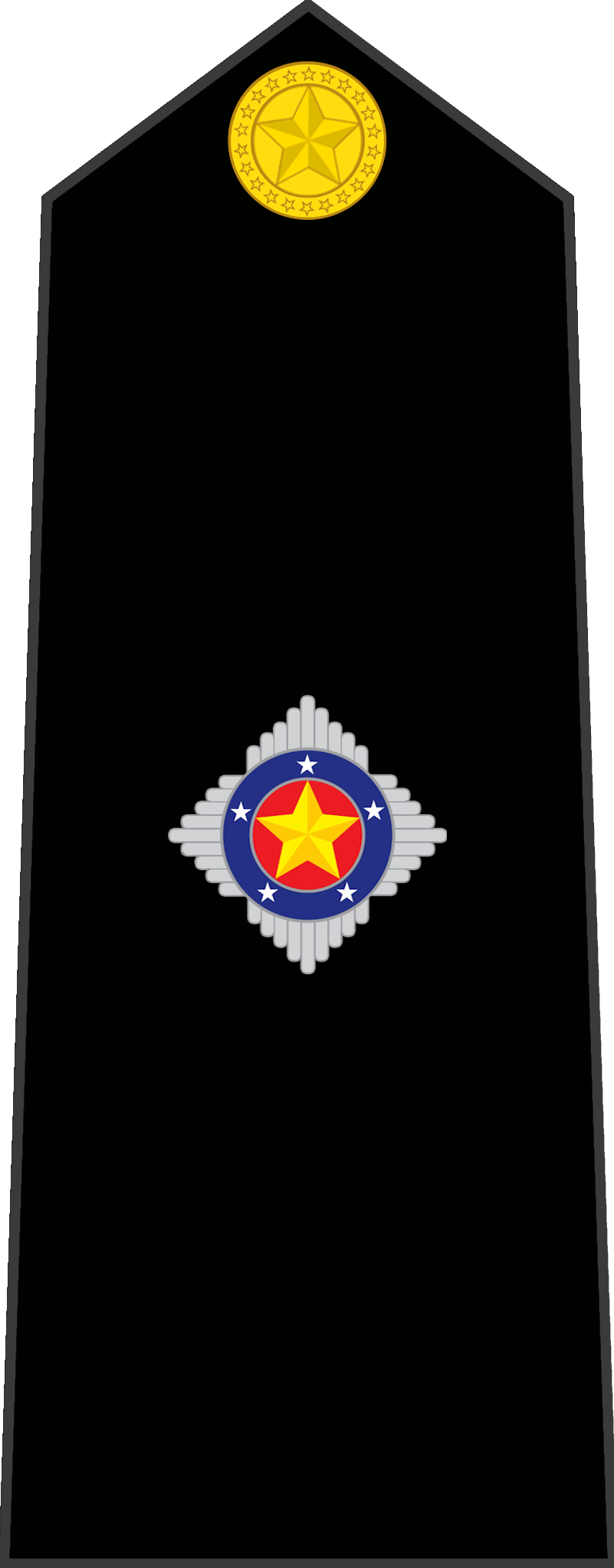
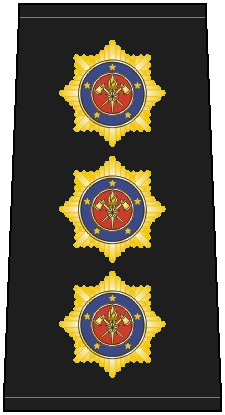
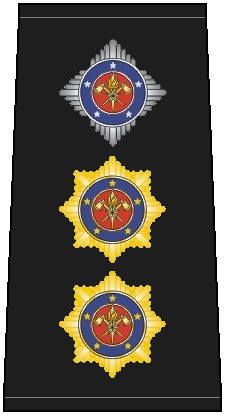
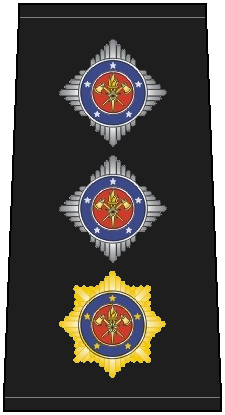
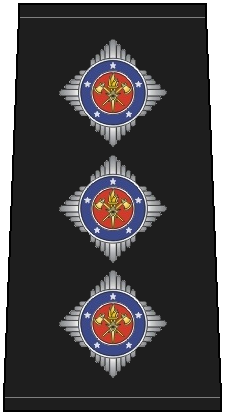
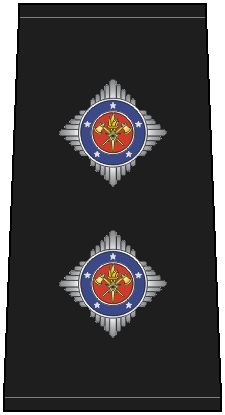
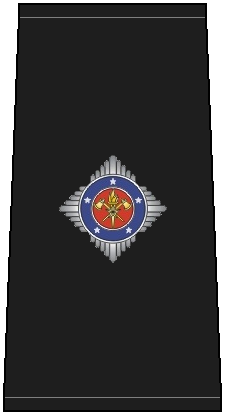
Rank group	General / flag officers				Senior officers			Junior officers
Brazilian Army
Brazilian Army	Marechal	General de exército	General de divisão	General de brigada	Coronel	Tenente-coronel	Major	Capitão	Primeiro tenente	Segundo tenente
Brazilian Navy
Brazilian Navy	Almirante	Almirante de esquadra	Vice-almirante	Contra-almirante	Capitão de mar e guerra	Capitão de fragata	Capitão de corveta	Capitão-tenente	Primeiro-tenente	Segundo-tenente
Brazilian Marine Corps
Brazilian Marine Corps		Almirante-de-esquadra fuzileiro naval	Vice-almirante fuzileiro naval	Contra-almirante fuzileiro naval	Capitão-de-mar-e-guerra fuzileiro naval	Capitão-de-fragata fuzileiro naval	Capitão-de-corveta fuzileiro naval	Capitão-tenente fuzileiro naval	Primeiro-tenente fuzileiro naval	Segundo-tenente fuzileiro naval
Brazilian Air Force
Brazilian Air Force	Marechal-do-ar	Tenente-brigadeiro do Ar	Major-brigadeiro	Brigadeiro	Coronel	Tenente-coronel	Major	Capitão	Primeiro-tenente	Segundo-tenente
Brazilian Military Police
Brazilian Military Police					Coronel	Tenente-coronel	Major	Capitão	Primeiro tenente	Segundo tenente
(Brazil) Military Firefighters Corps
(Brazil) Military Firefighters Corps					Coronel	Tenente-coronel	Major	Capitão	Primeiro tenente	Segundo tenente
Rank group	General / flag officers				Senior officers			Junior officers

=== Police force and firefighter corps commanders and chiefs ===
The highest commander of the police force is the governor. Since it serves as an auxiliary force to the army, the highest rank attainable is that of colonel. However, there are special ranks designated for military commanders within the police. These positions are appointed by each governor and are exclusively assigned to senior officers, most of whom are colonels.

The design of insignias may vary from state to state, and in some states, certain positions may or may not include a distinction in rank design. The representations shown are generalized artistic illustrations and may not reflect the exact insignias used in each state.

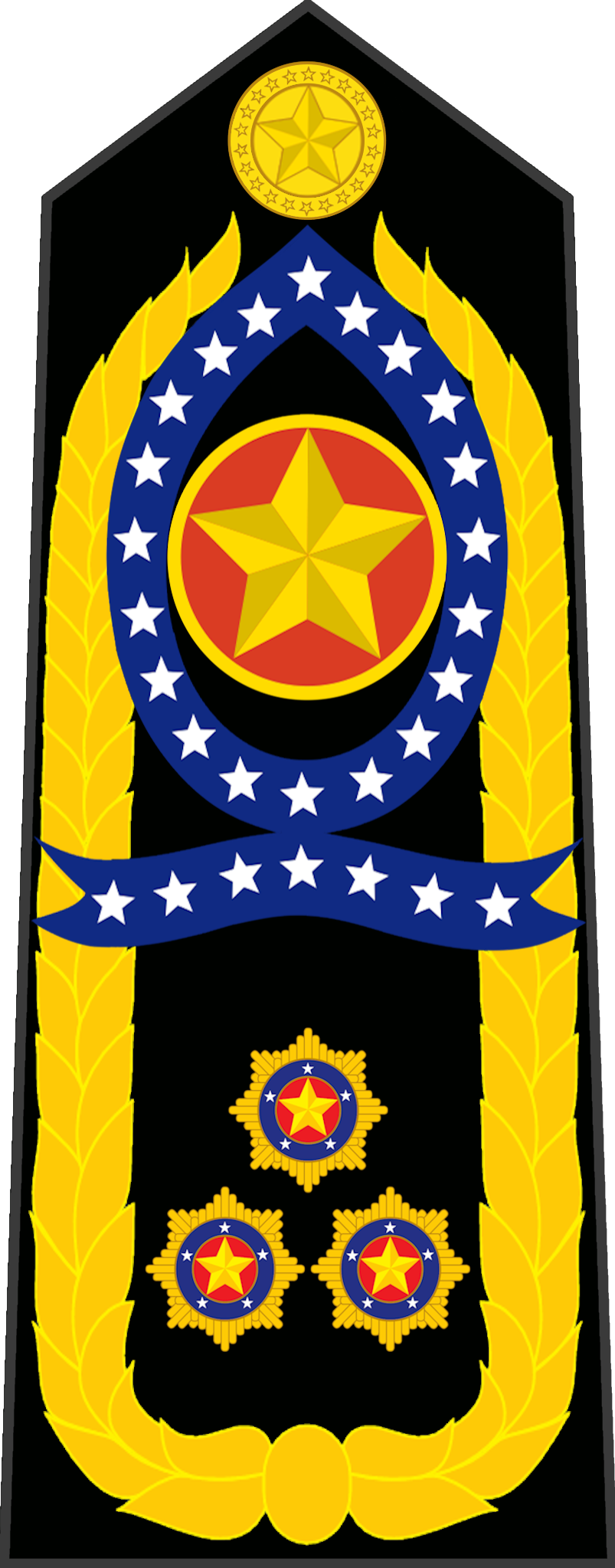
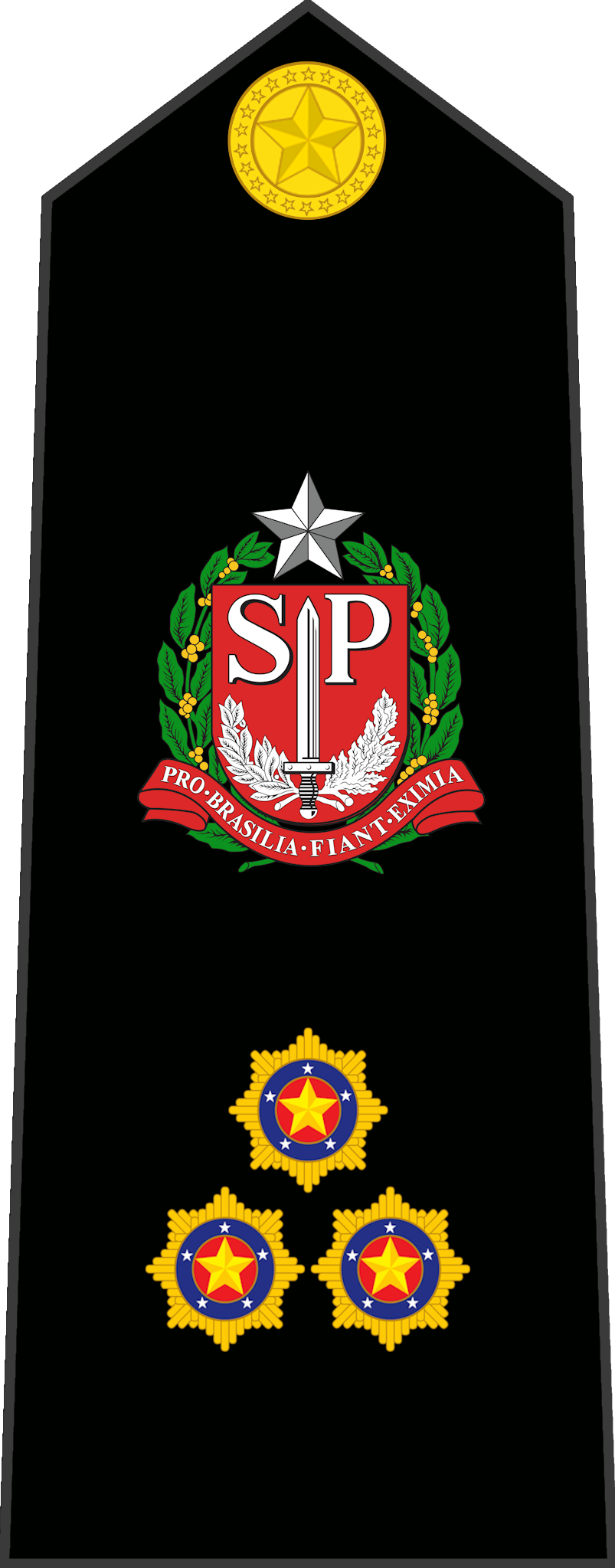
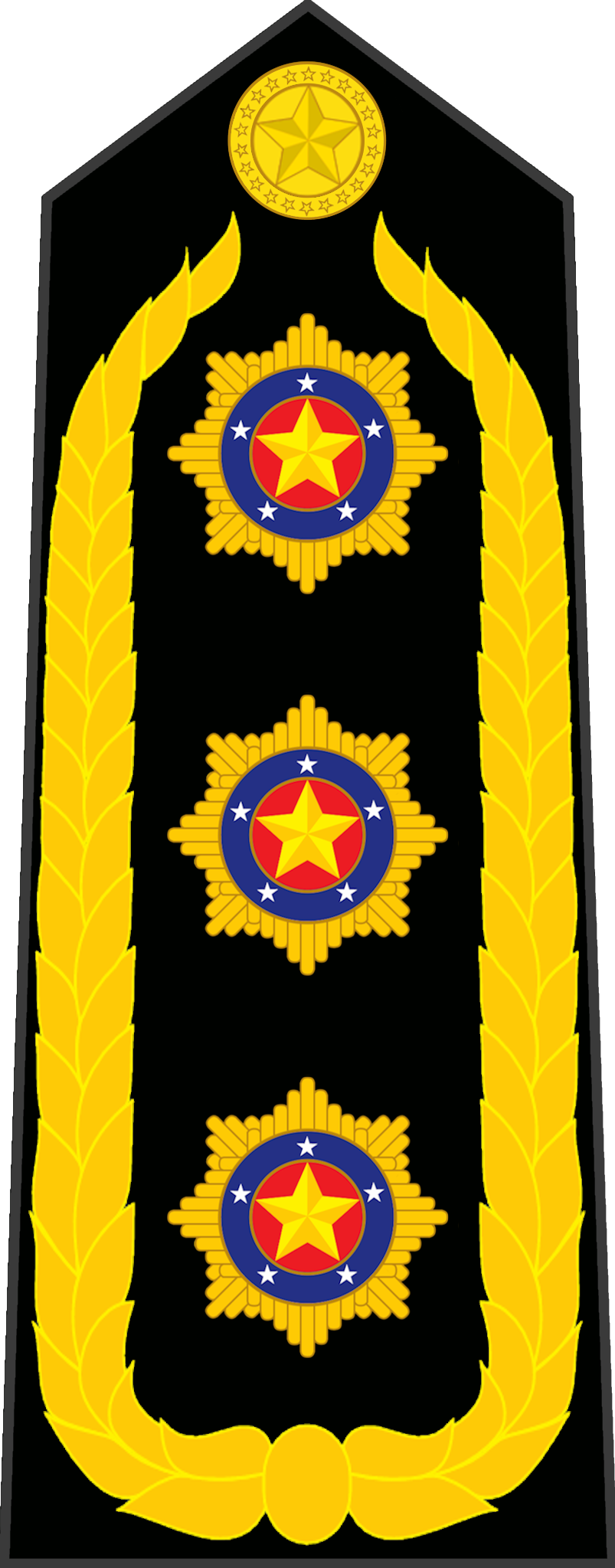
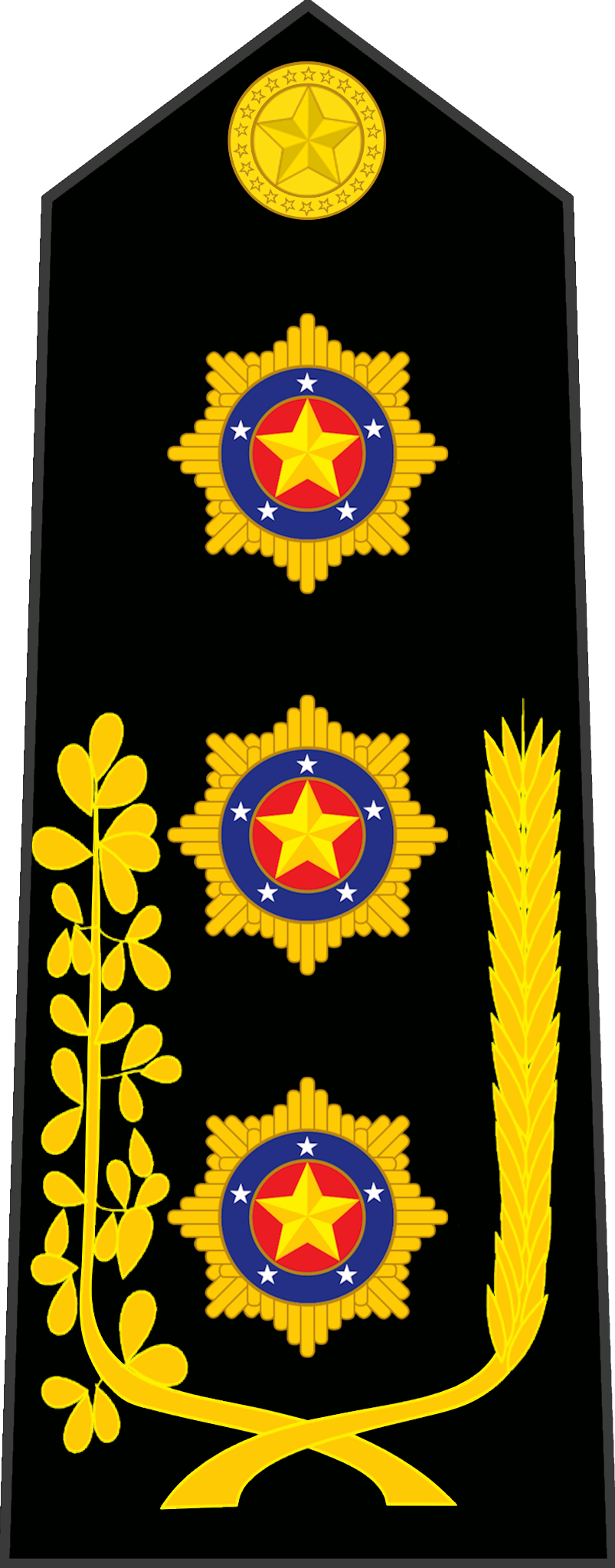
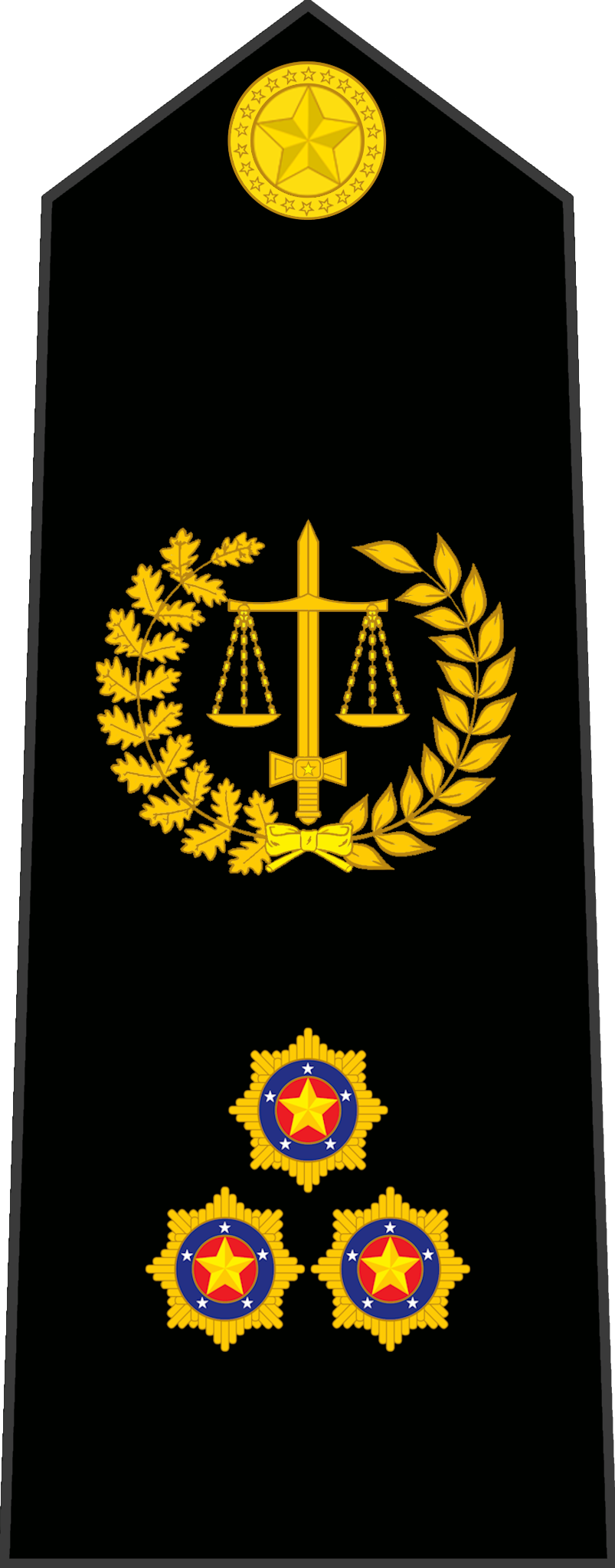
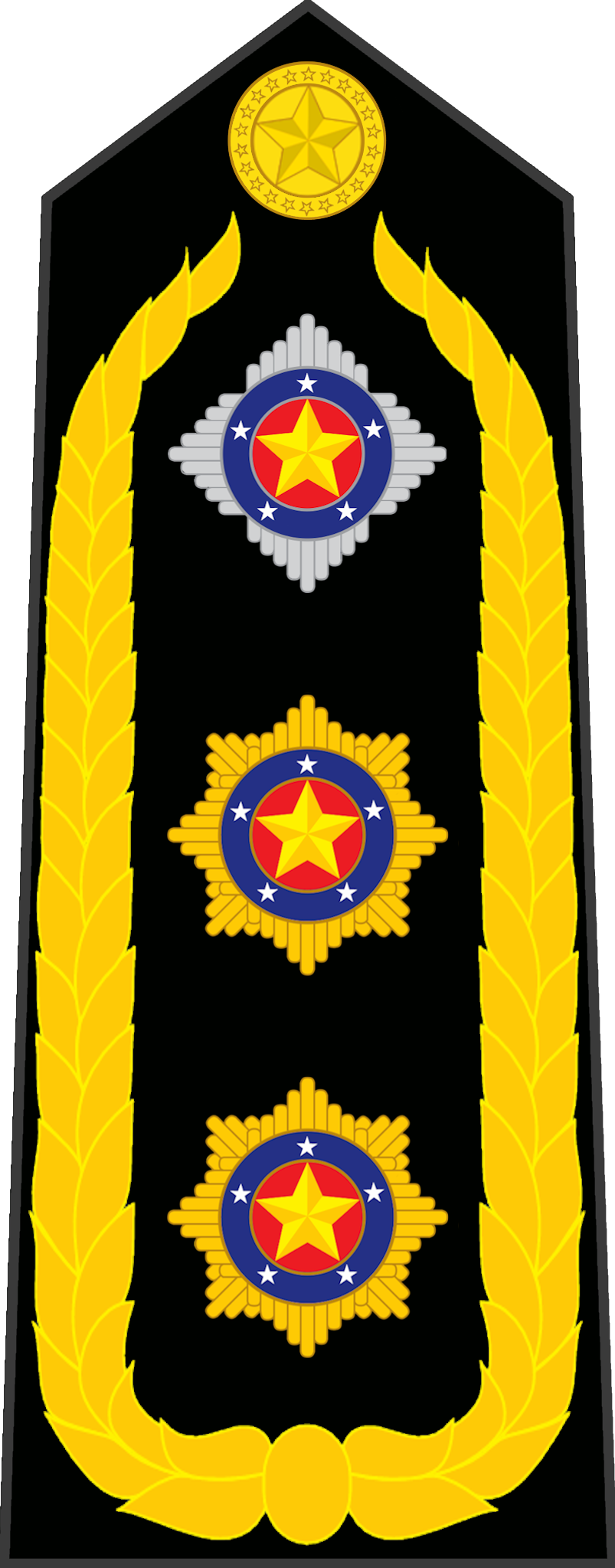
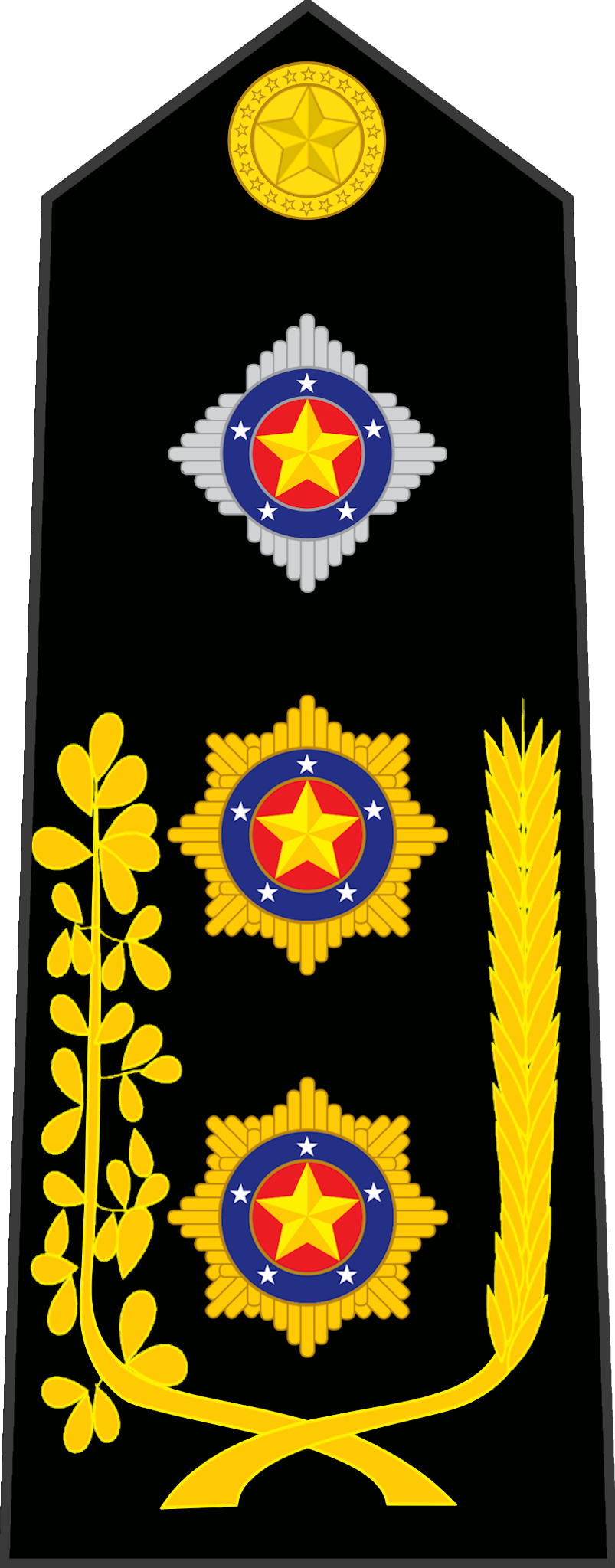
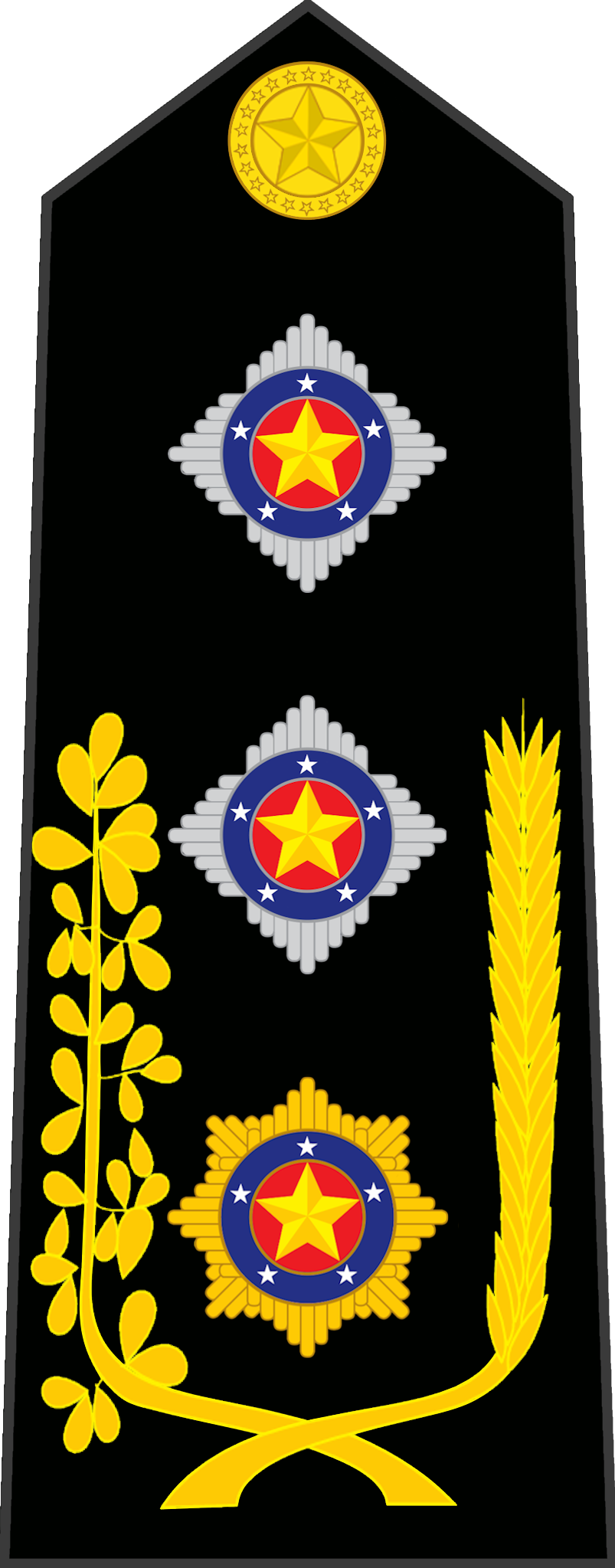
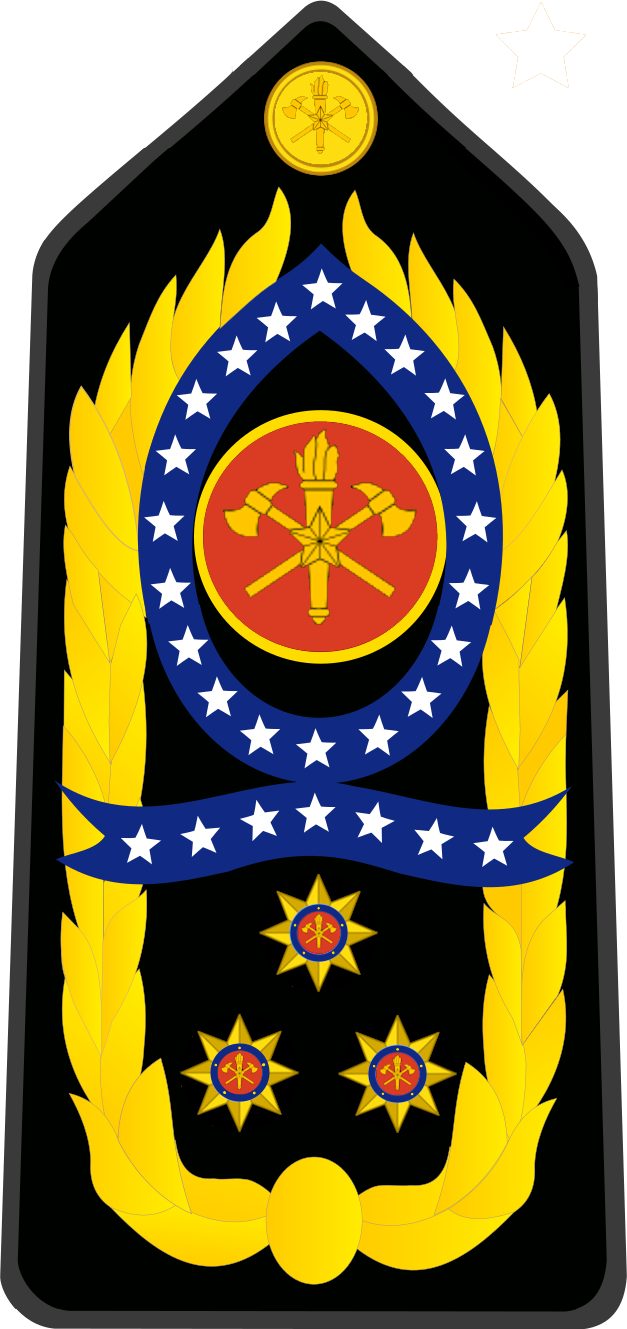
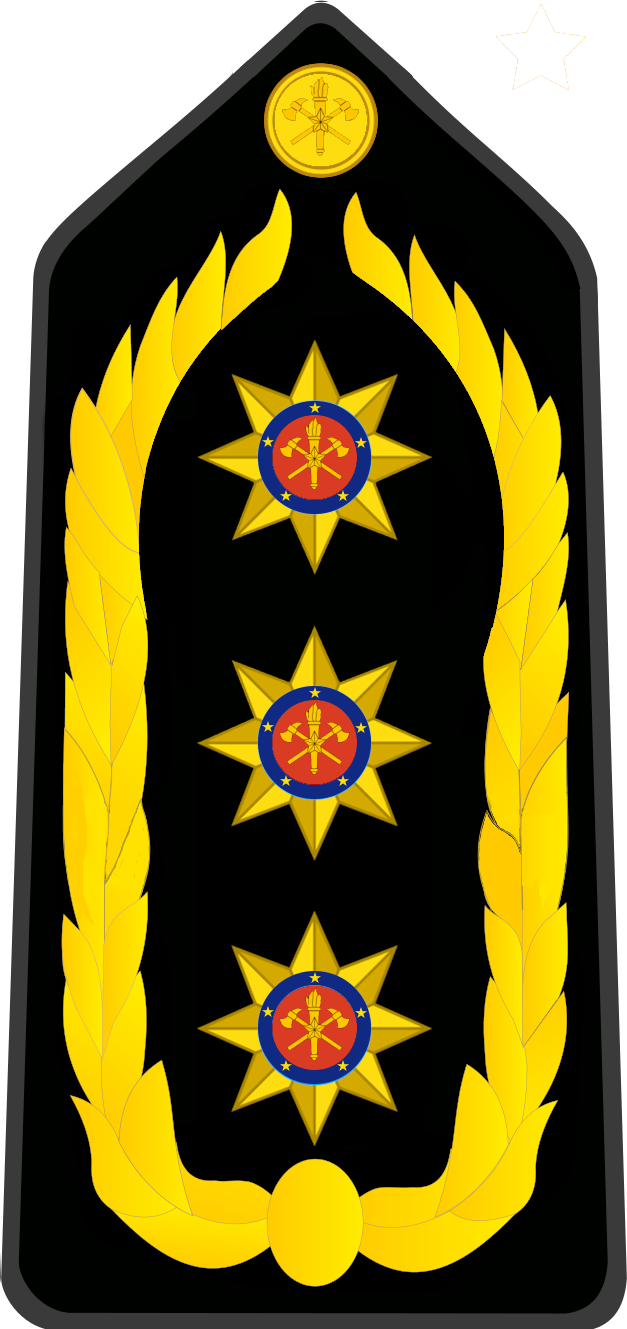
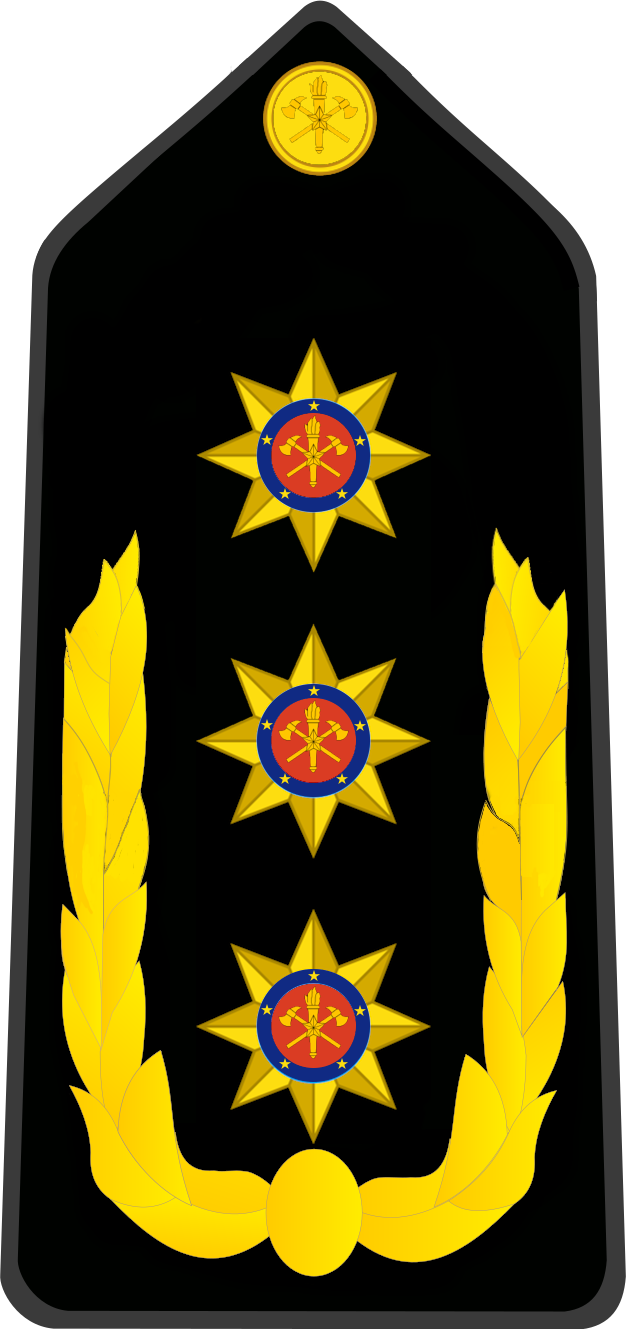
Rank	Colonel					Lieutenant colonel	Major
Brazilian Military Police
Brazilian Military Police	Comandante geral	Governor military cabinet chief (SP)	Deputy general commander	Chief of Staff	Colonel in the role of military court judge	Governor military cabinet chief/ Interim	Governor military cabinet chief
(Brazil) Military Firefighters Corps
(Brazil) Military Firefighters Corps	Comandante Geral		Deputy general commander	Chief of Staff

Note: The insignias in the table were artistically created based on real models from various Brazilian states. They serve illustrative purposes and may include minor inaccuracies or design differences compared to official state insignias.

=== Rank flags ===
Rank	General / Flag Officers	Senior Officers
Brazilian Army		
Brazilian Navy		
Brazilian Air Force		

=== Student officers ===
Each branch of the Brazilian Armed Forces has its own institutions for training commissioned officers (COs) and non-commissioned officers (NCOs). The academies responsible for officer training in each branch are:

- Army: Agulhas Negras Military Academy (AMAN), Military Institute of Engineering (IME), Reserve Officers' Training Centers (NPOR/CPOR), Army School of Health and Complementary Training (ESFCEx/EsFCEx) (Which also houses the Military Chaplains School for the Army), and the Army School of Physical Education (EsEFEx).
- Navy: Naval School (EN) and Admiral Wandenkolk Training Center (CIAW).
- Air Force: Brazilian Air Force Academy (AFA) and Air Force Reserve Officers' Preparatory Centers (CPORAER).

For police forces, each state has its own academies; however, the most famous is the Barro Branco Police Academy (APMBB) in the state of São Paulo.

Note: It is worth noting that most police and firefighter academies in Brazil last 3 years, with the Barro Branco Police Academy being one of the only ones that lasts 4 years.

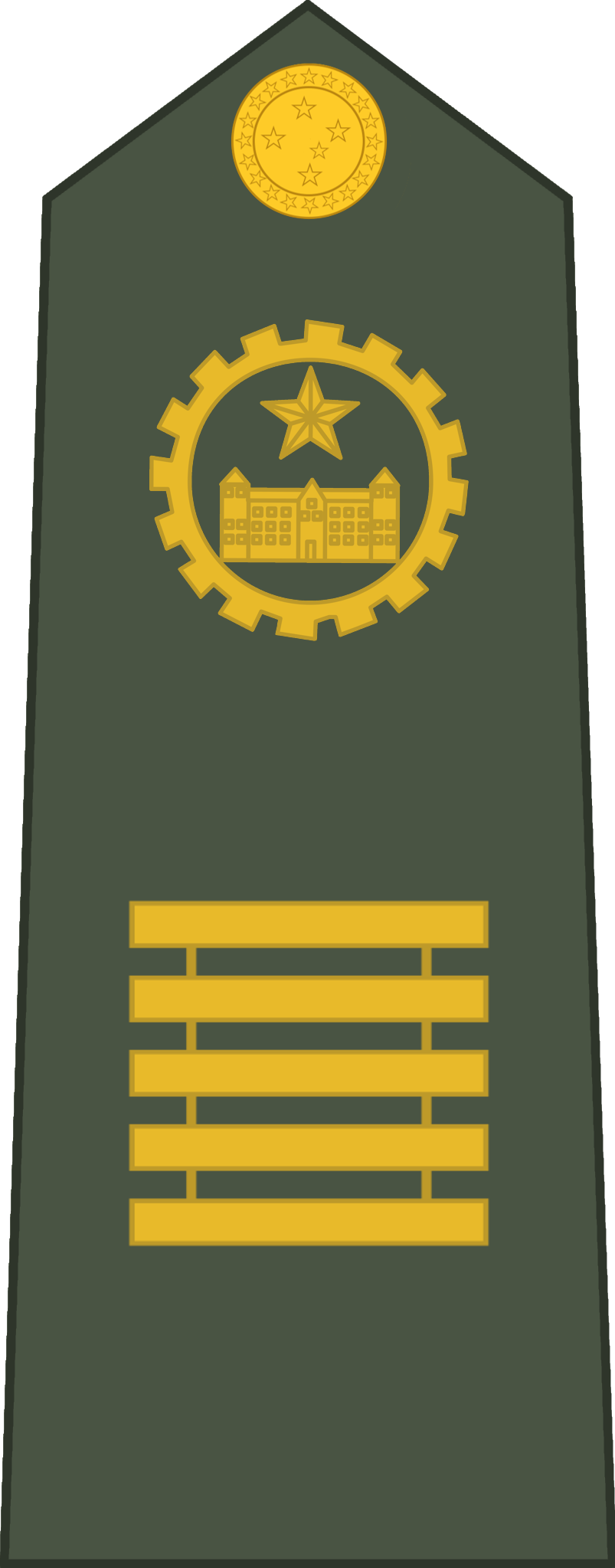
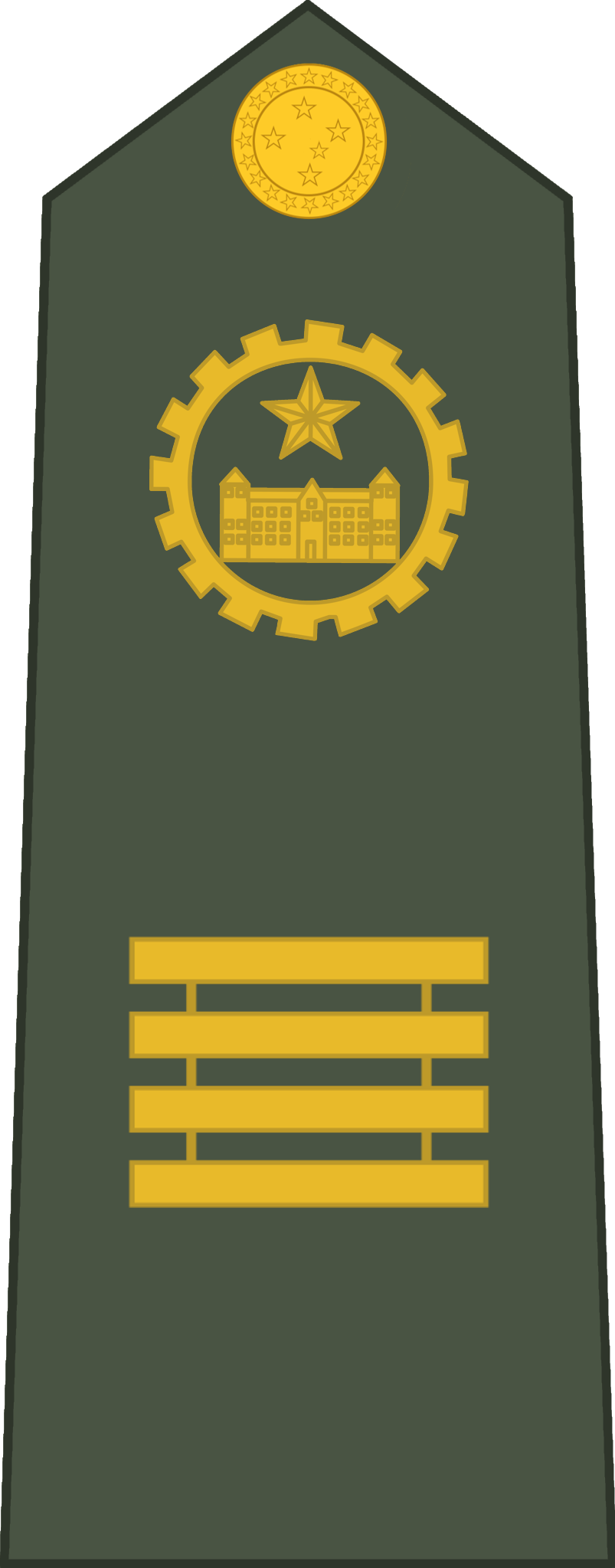
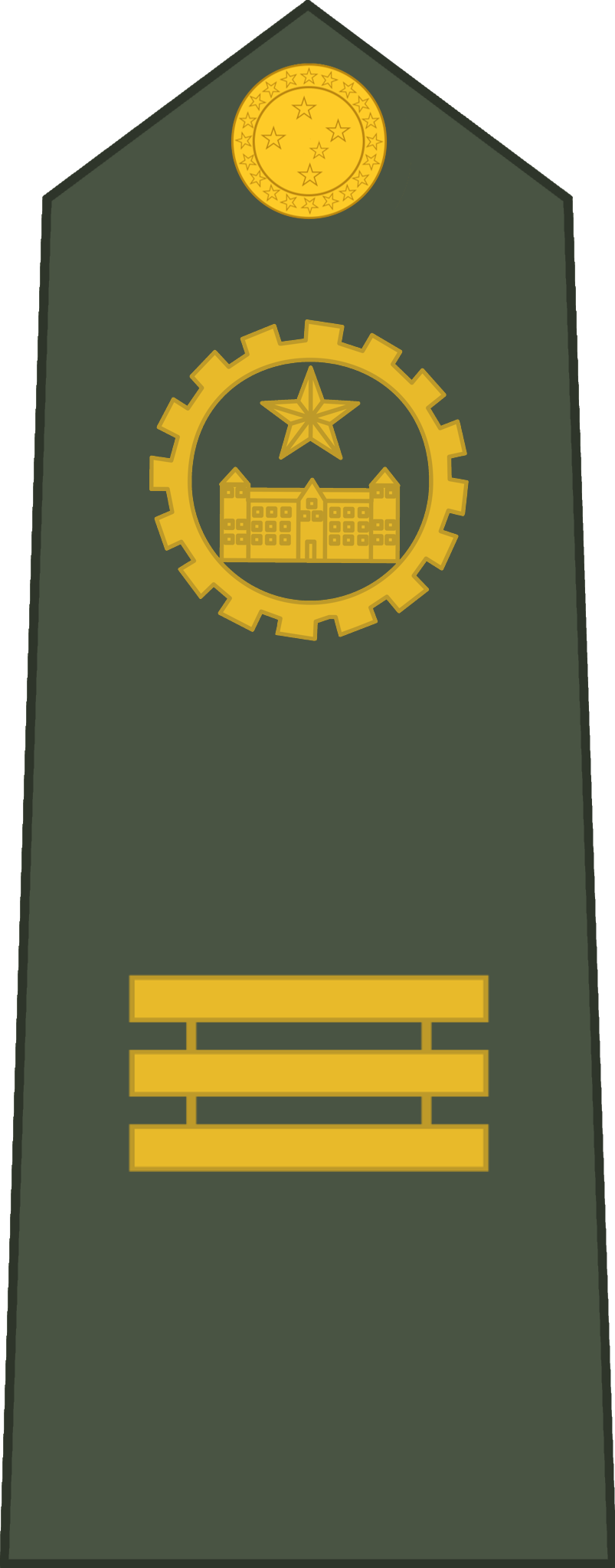
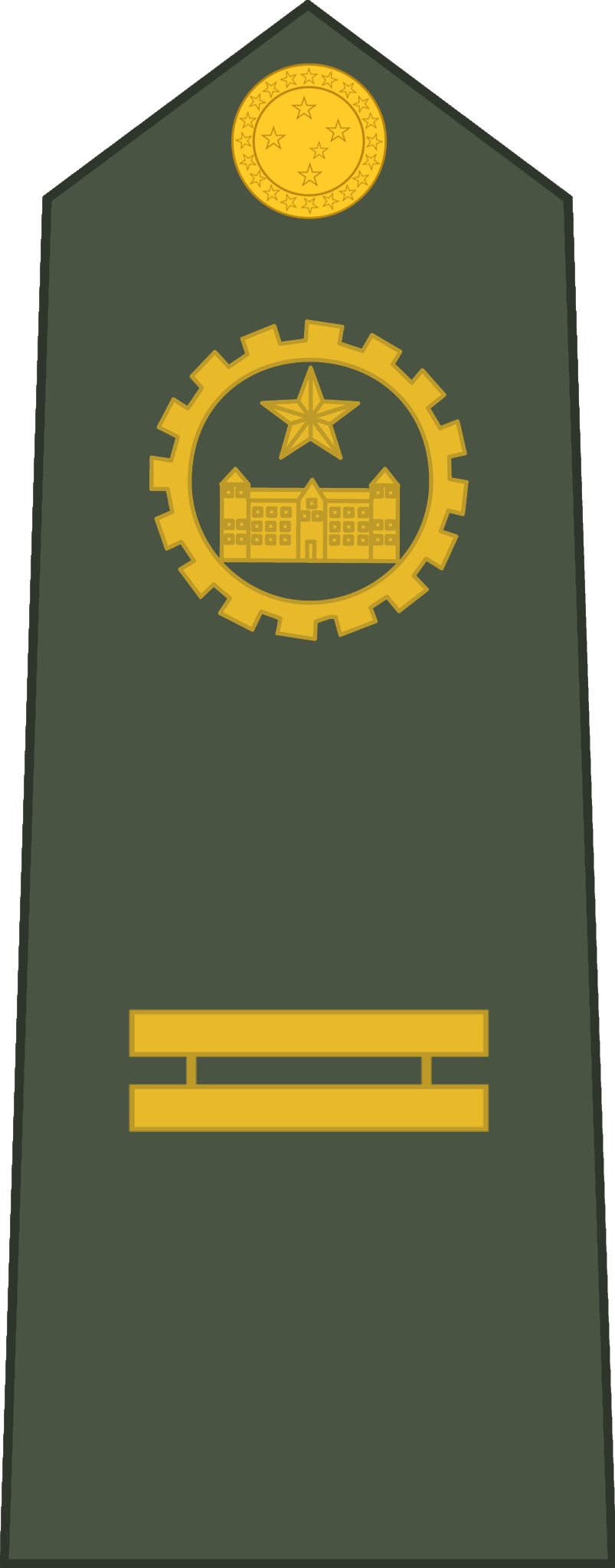
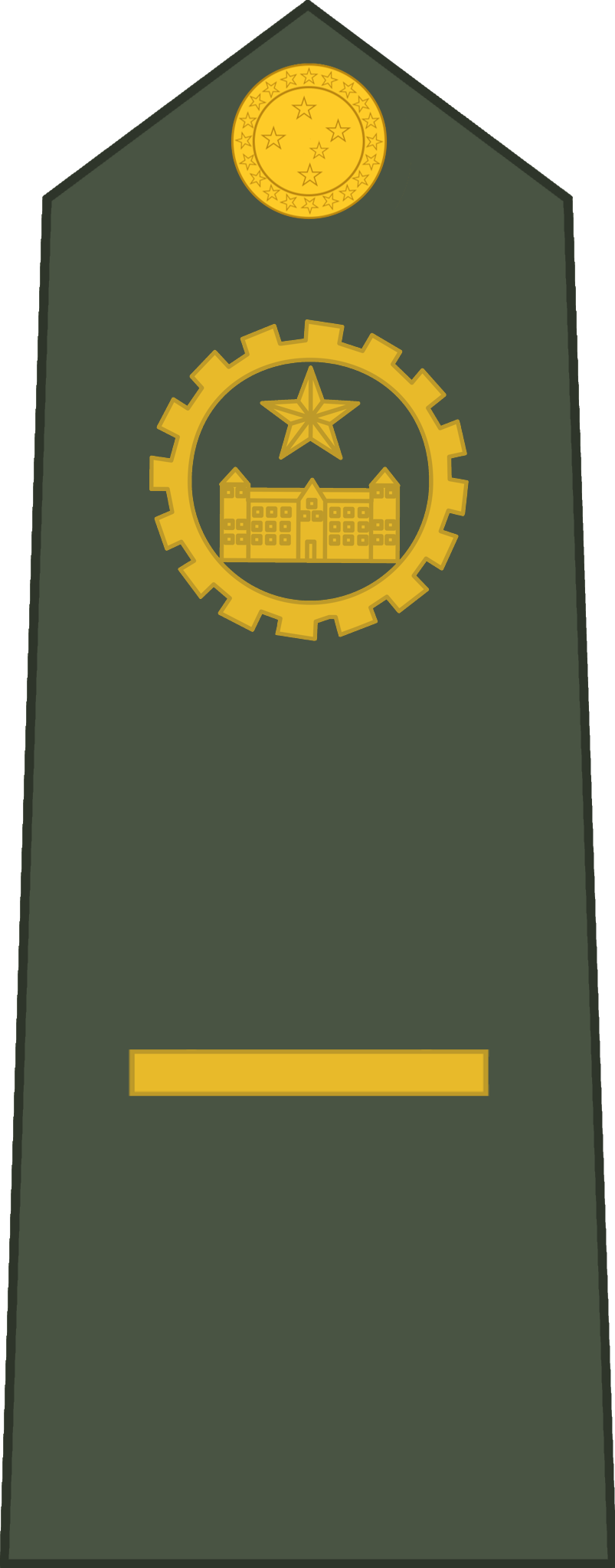
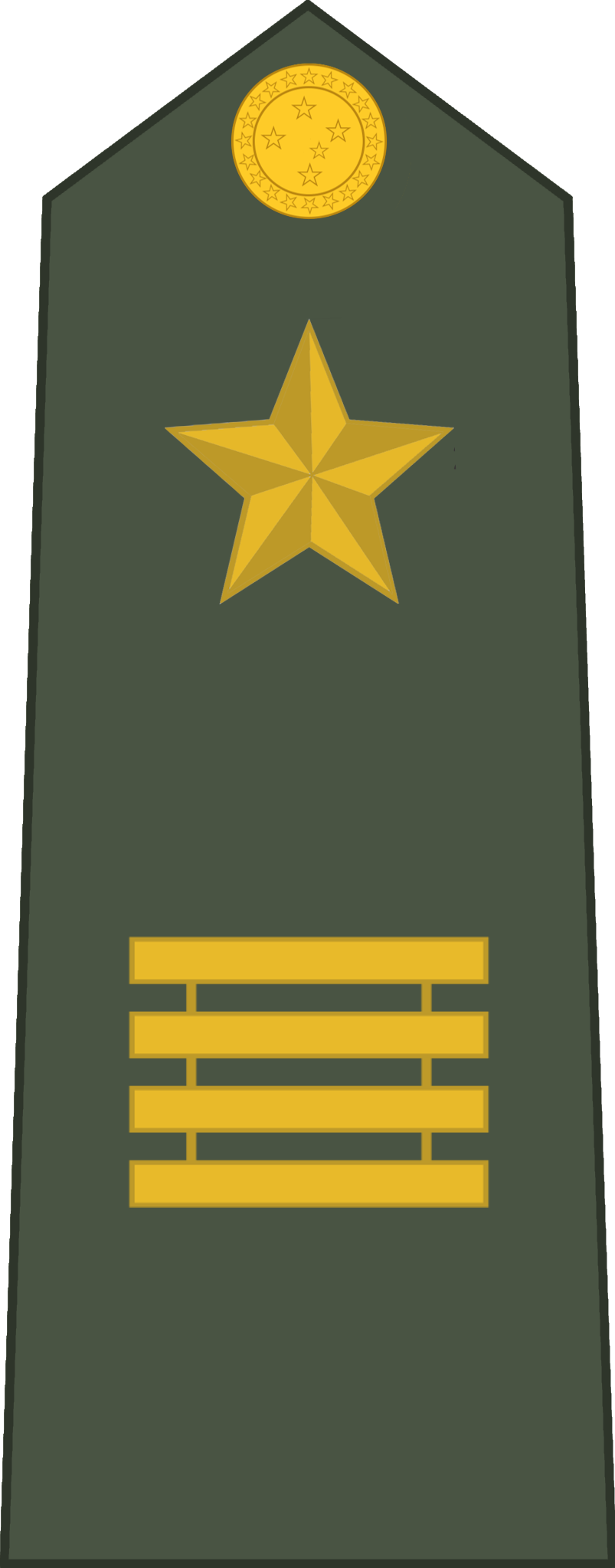
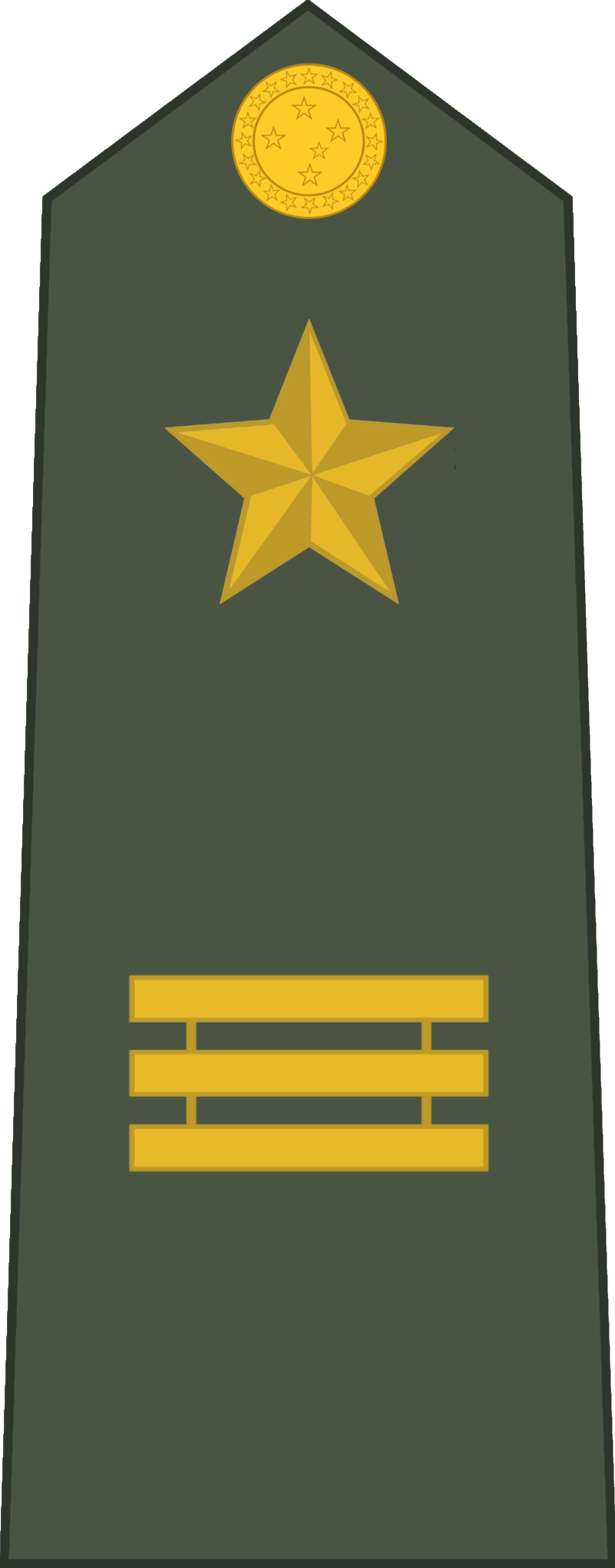
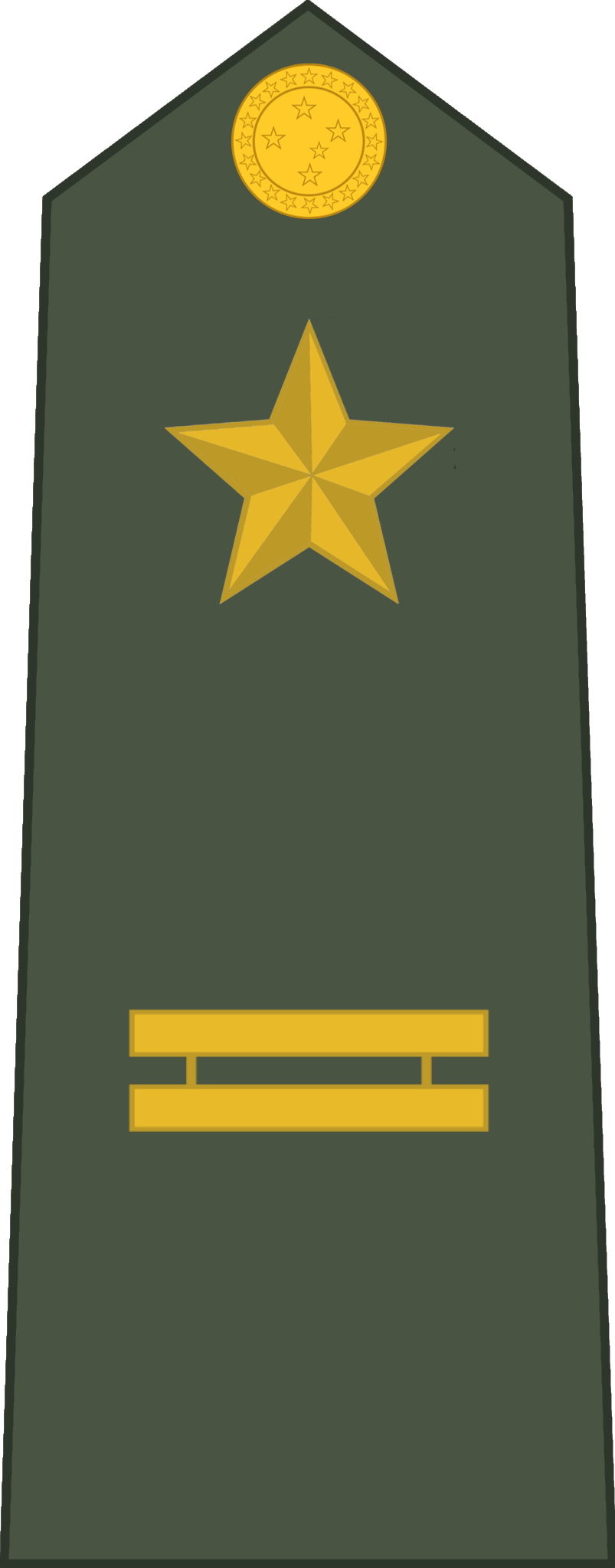
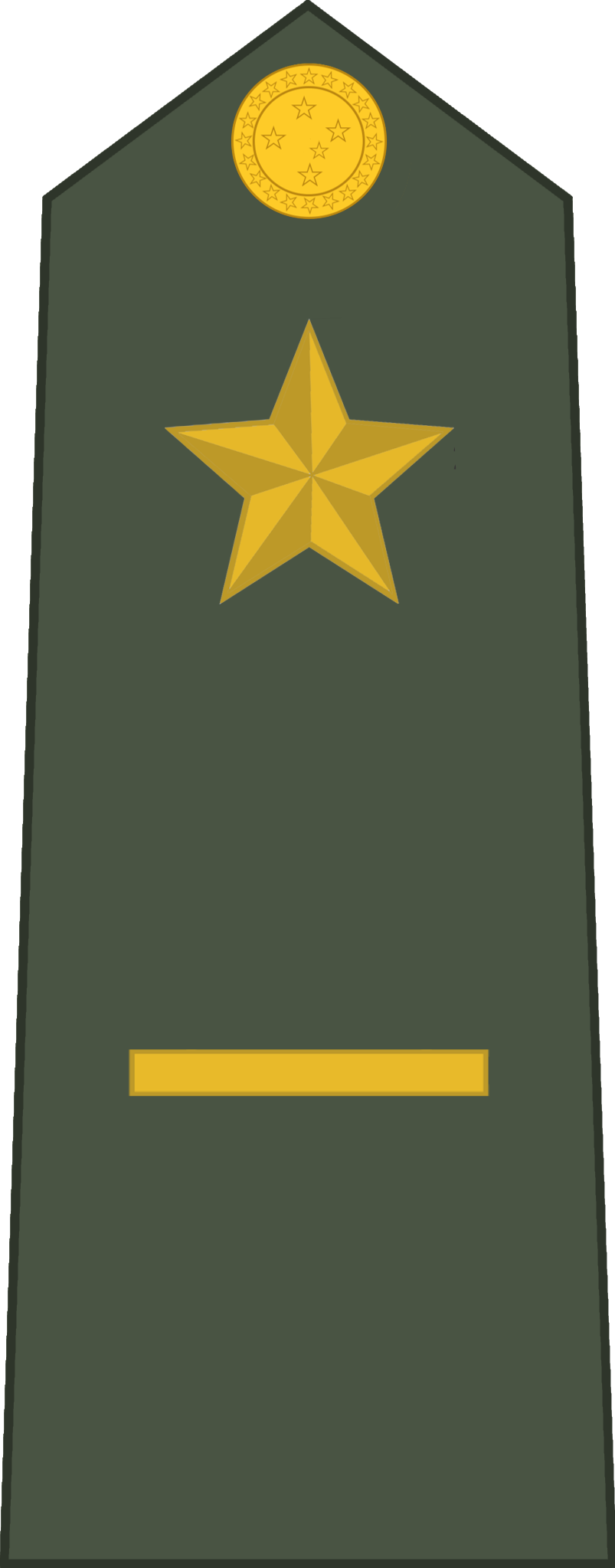
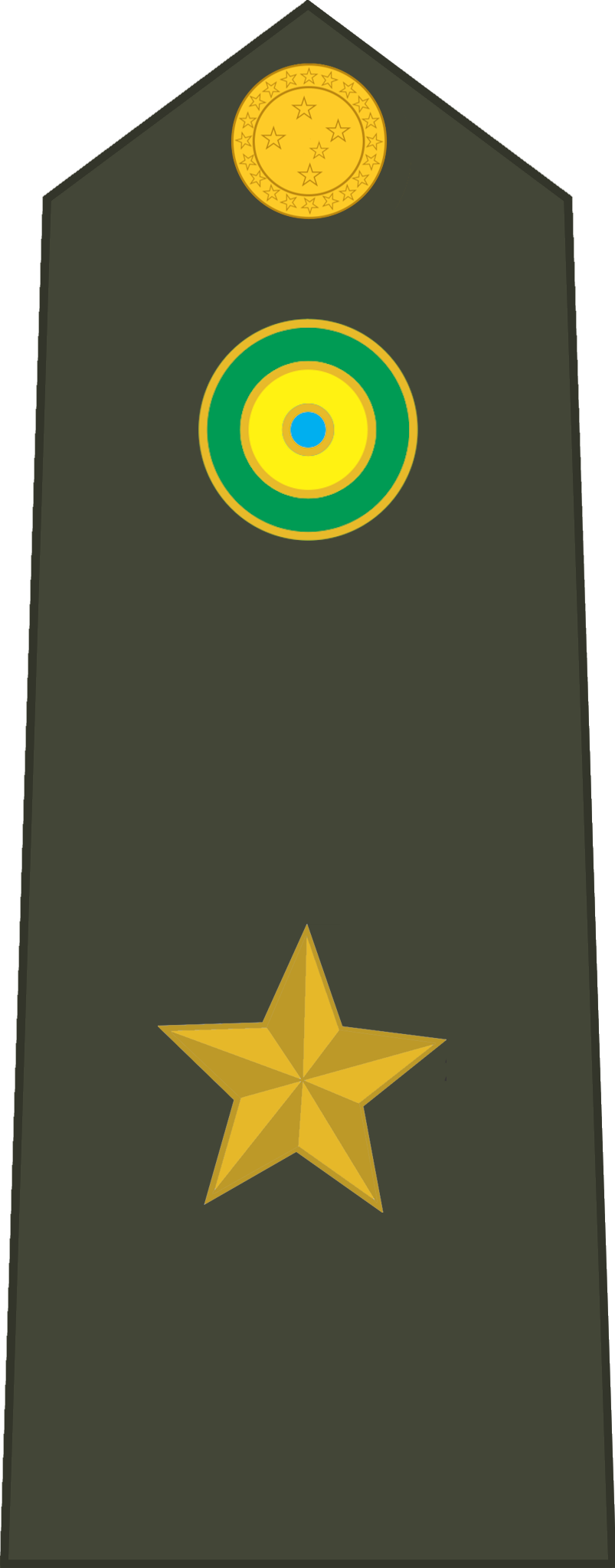
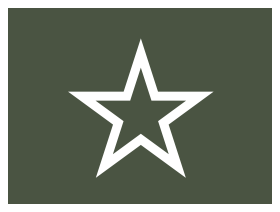
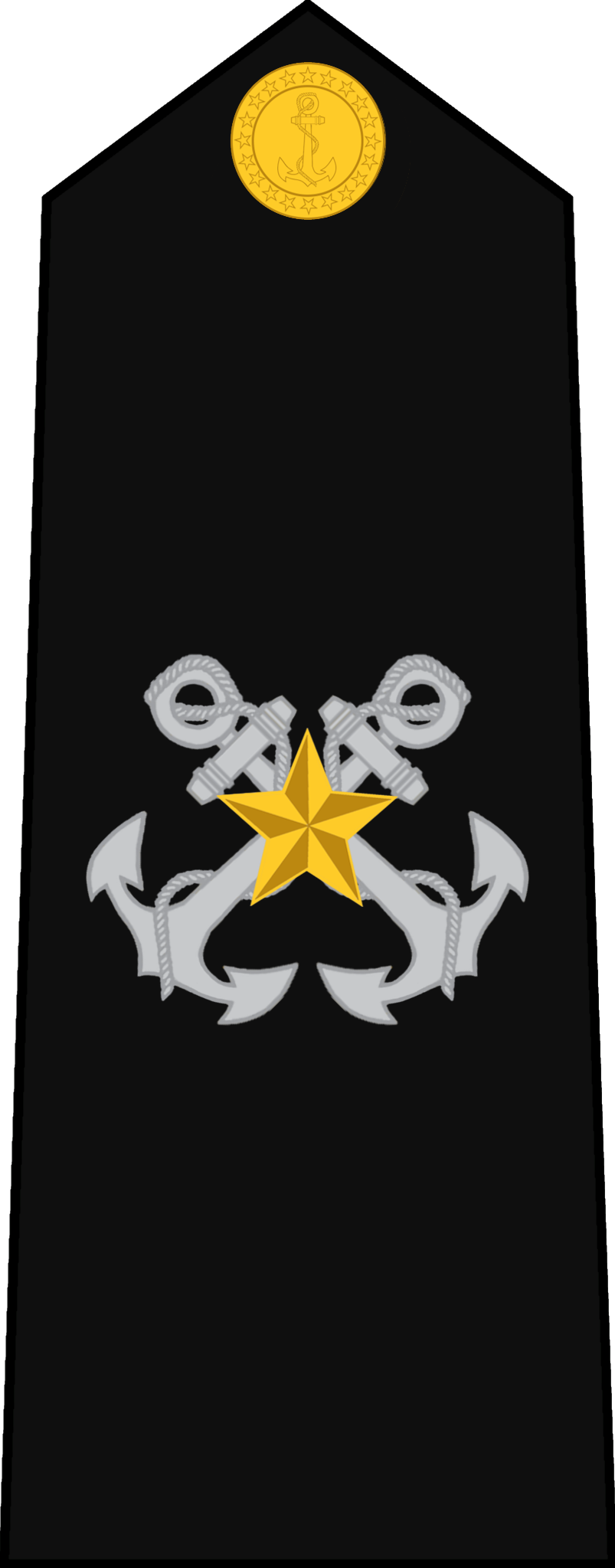
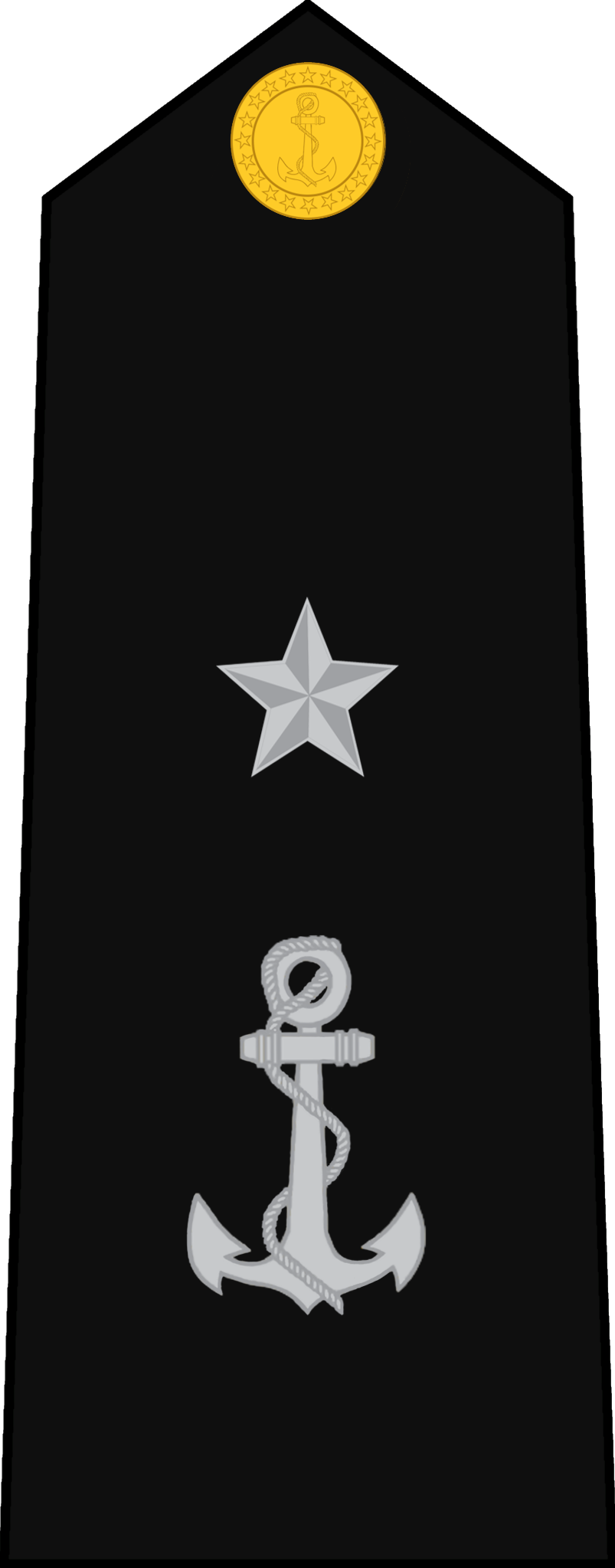
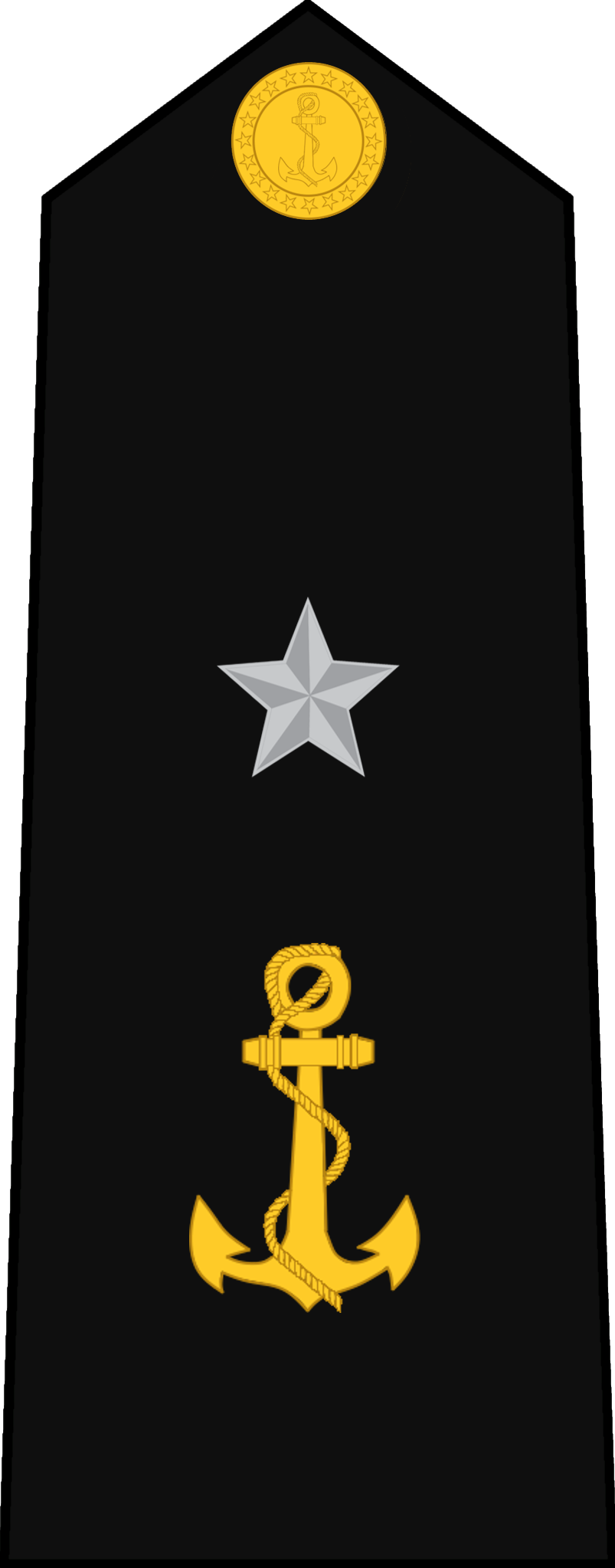
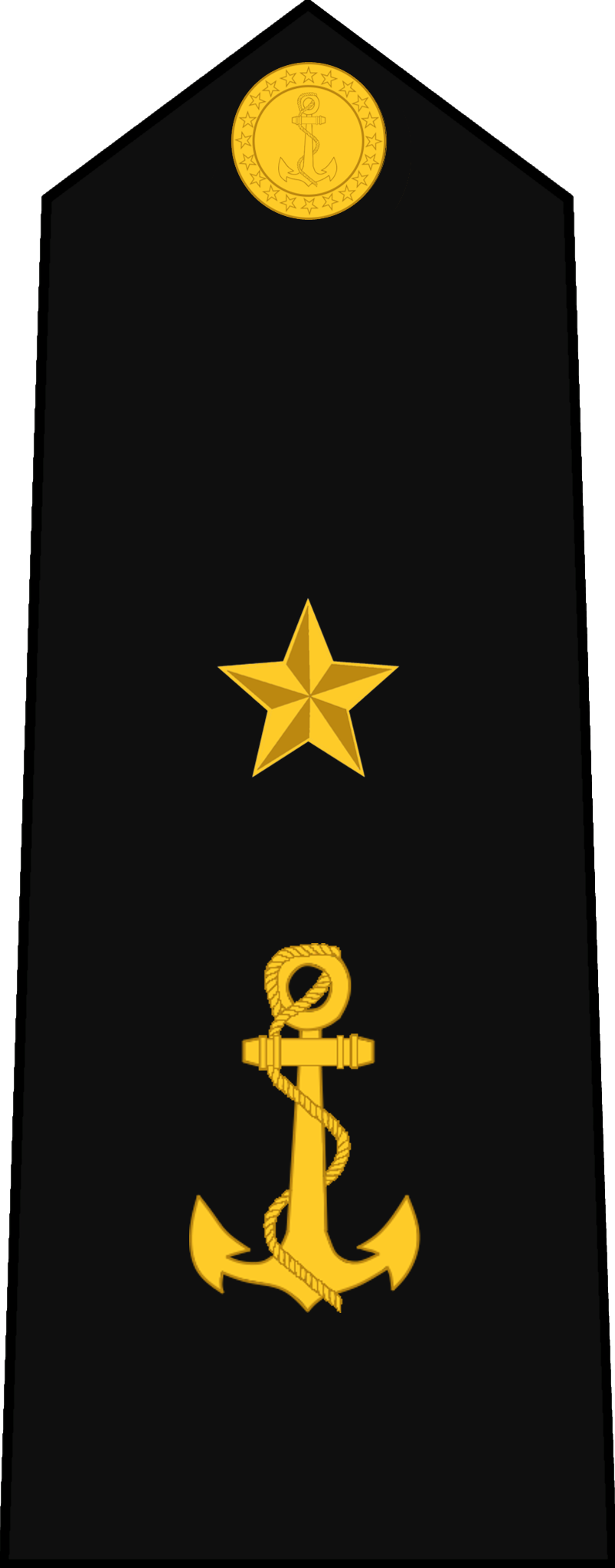
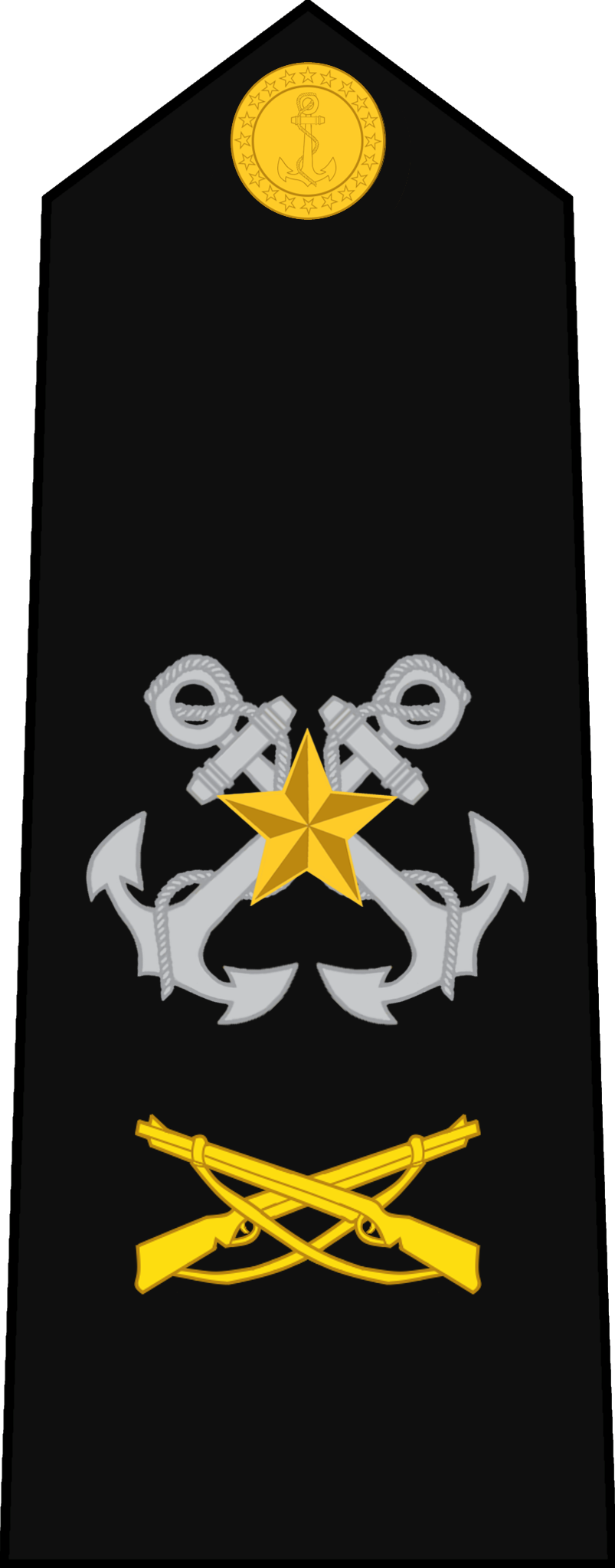
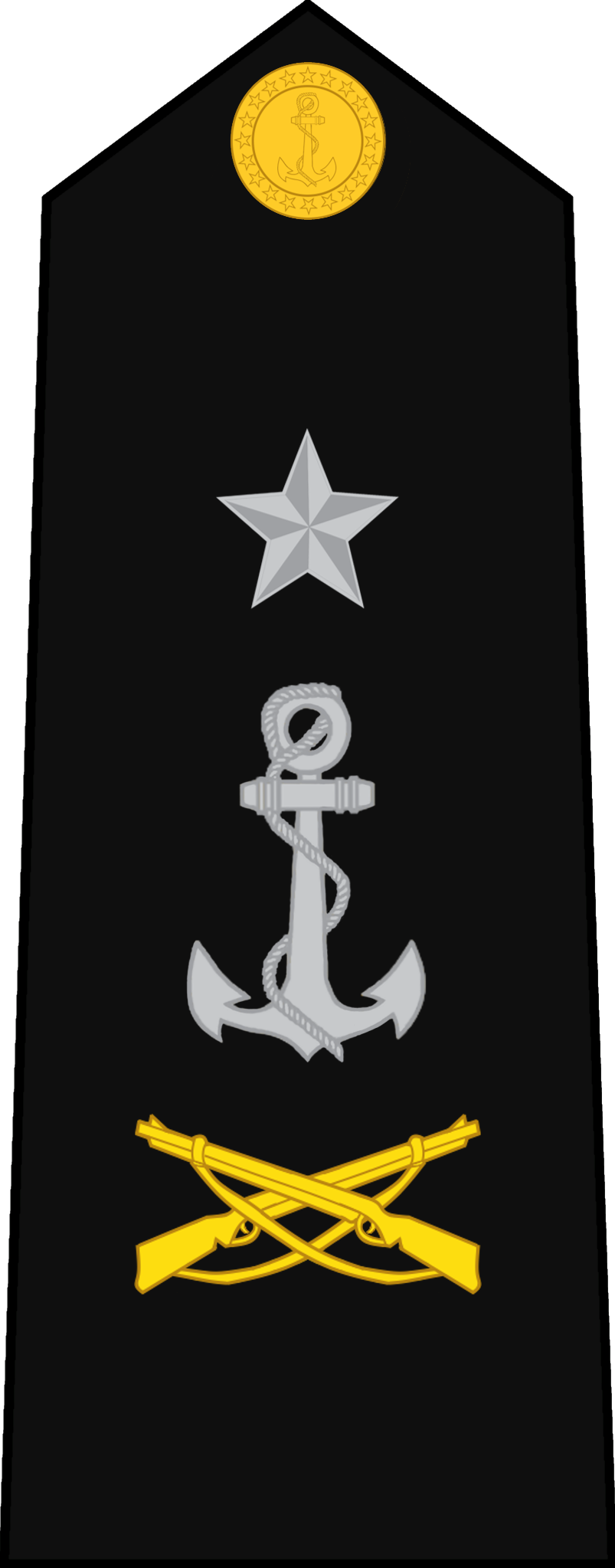
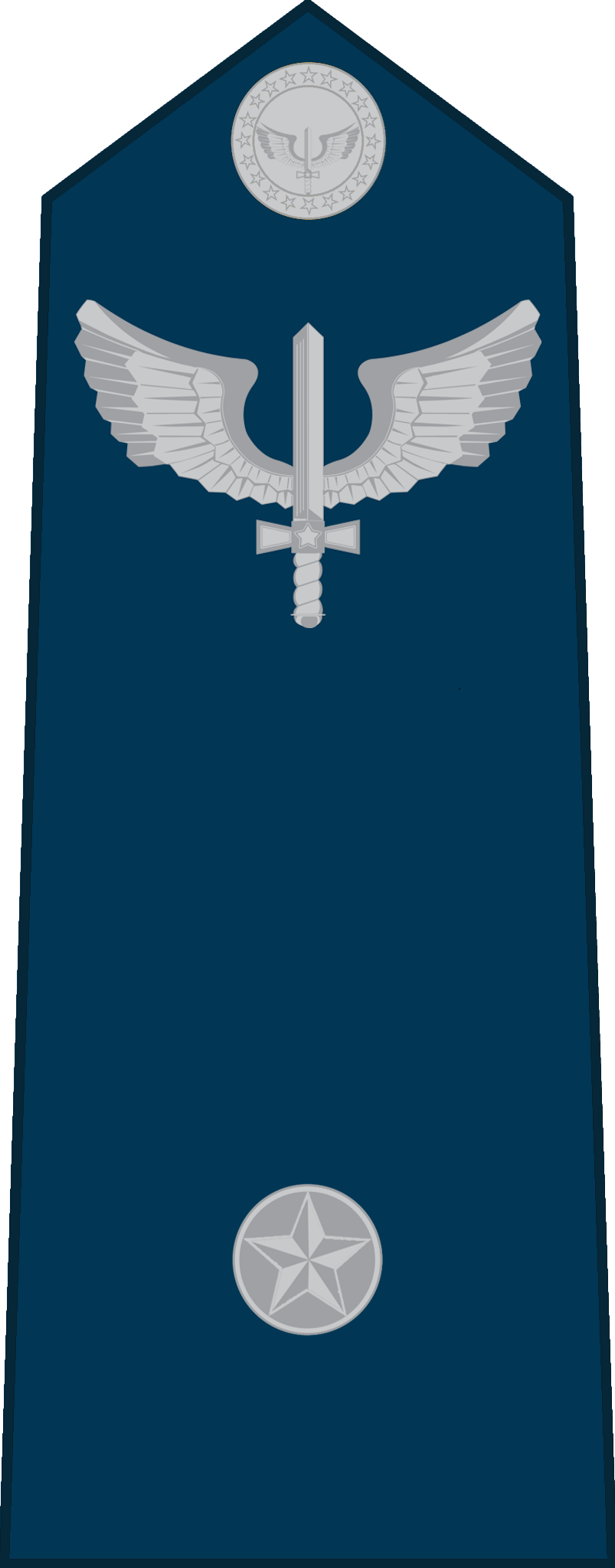
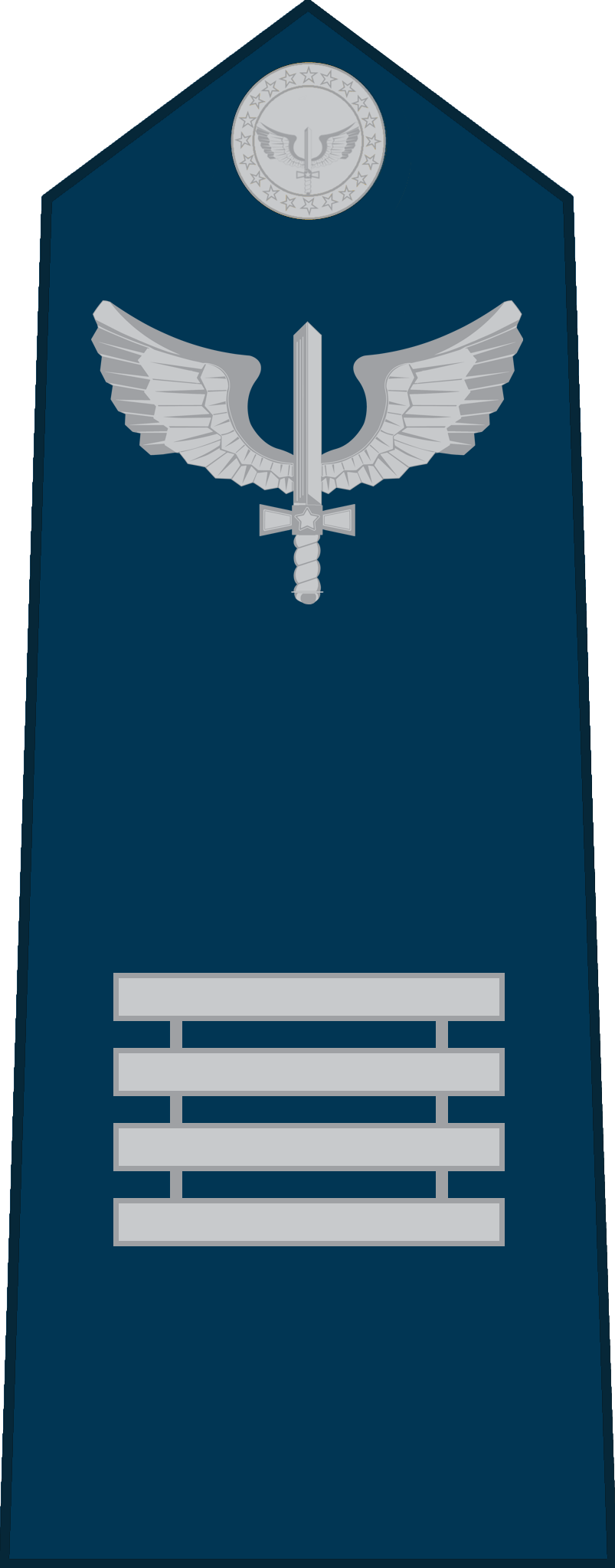
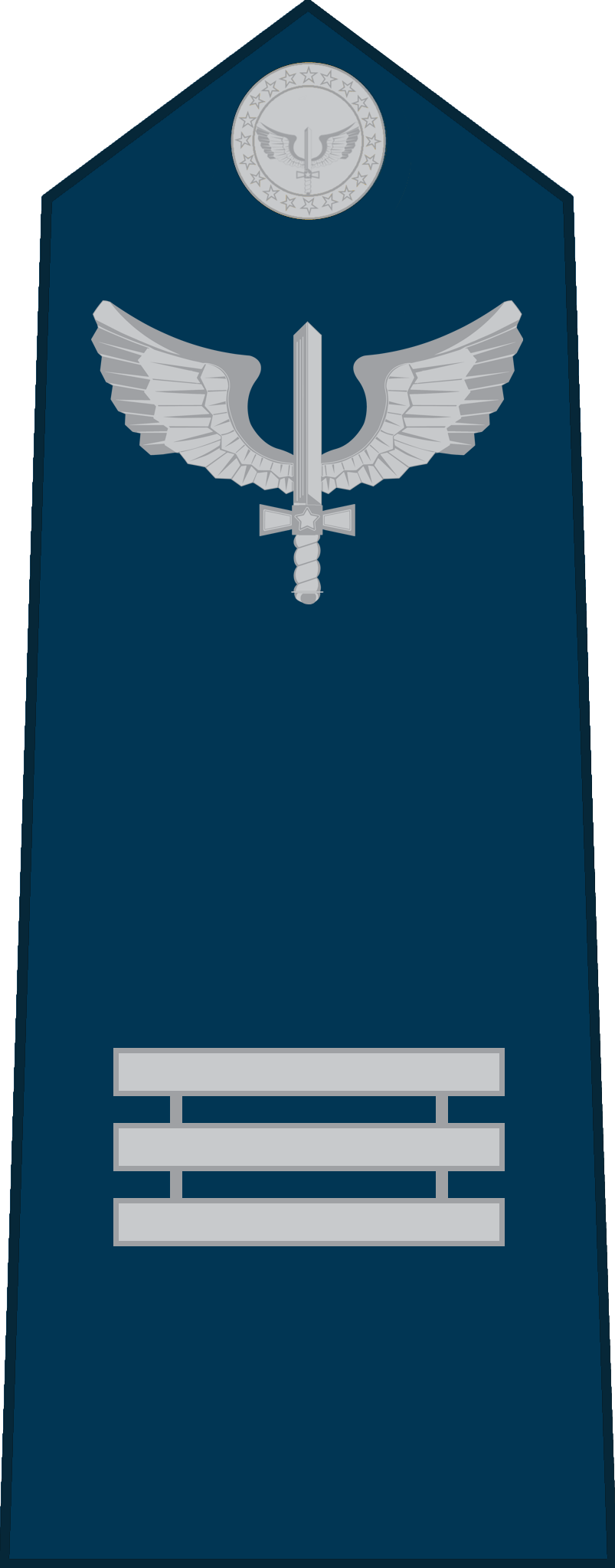
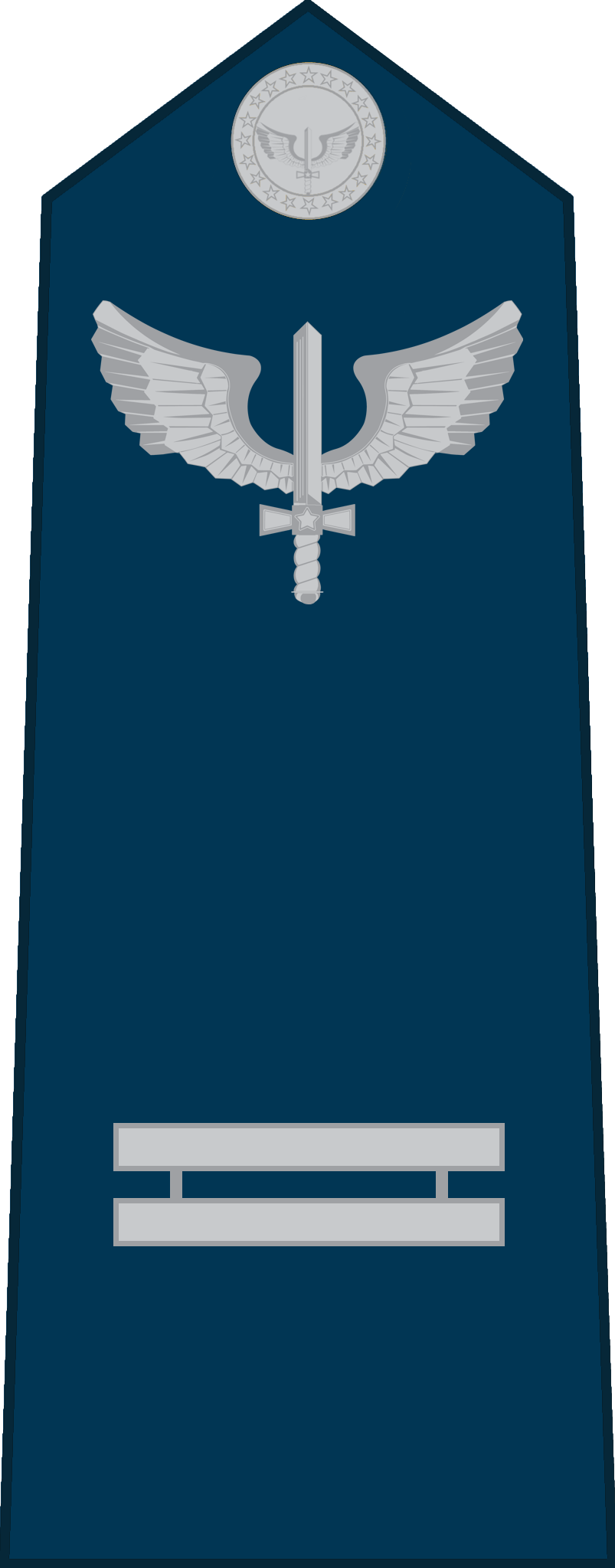
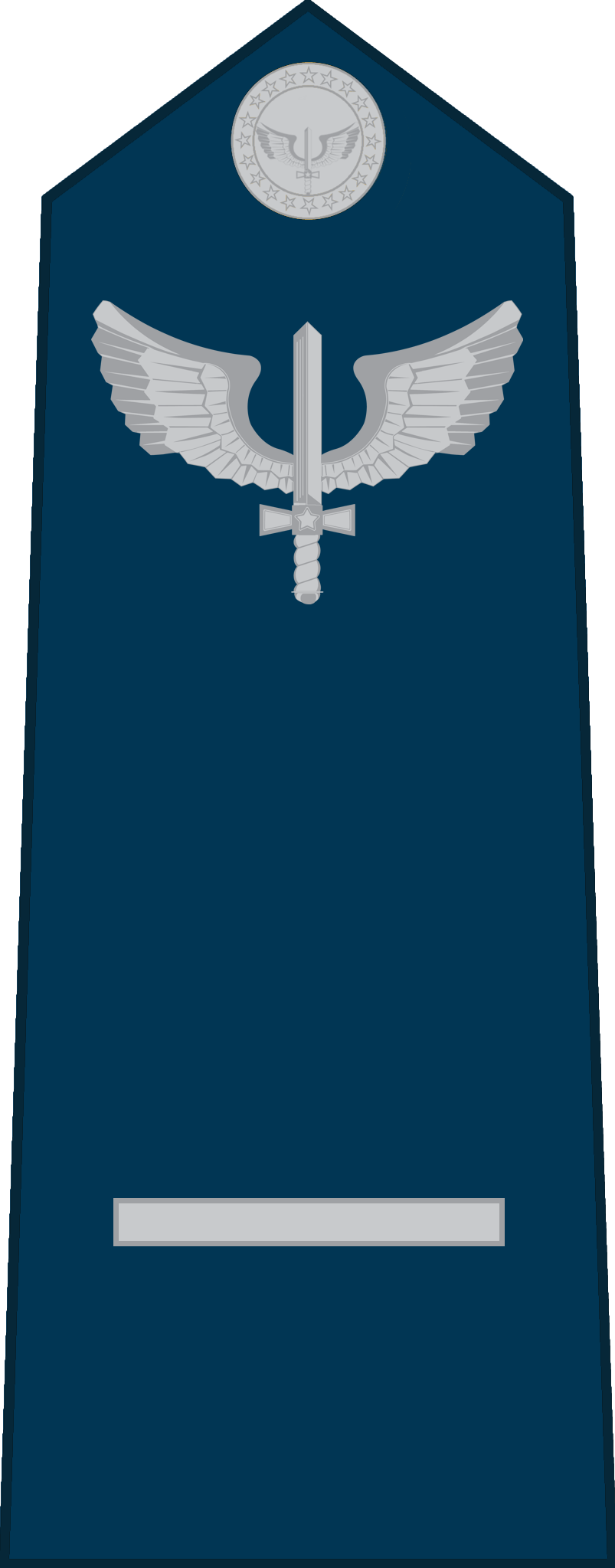
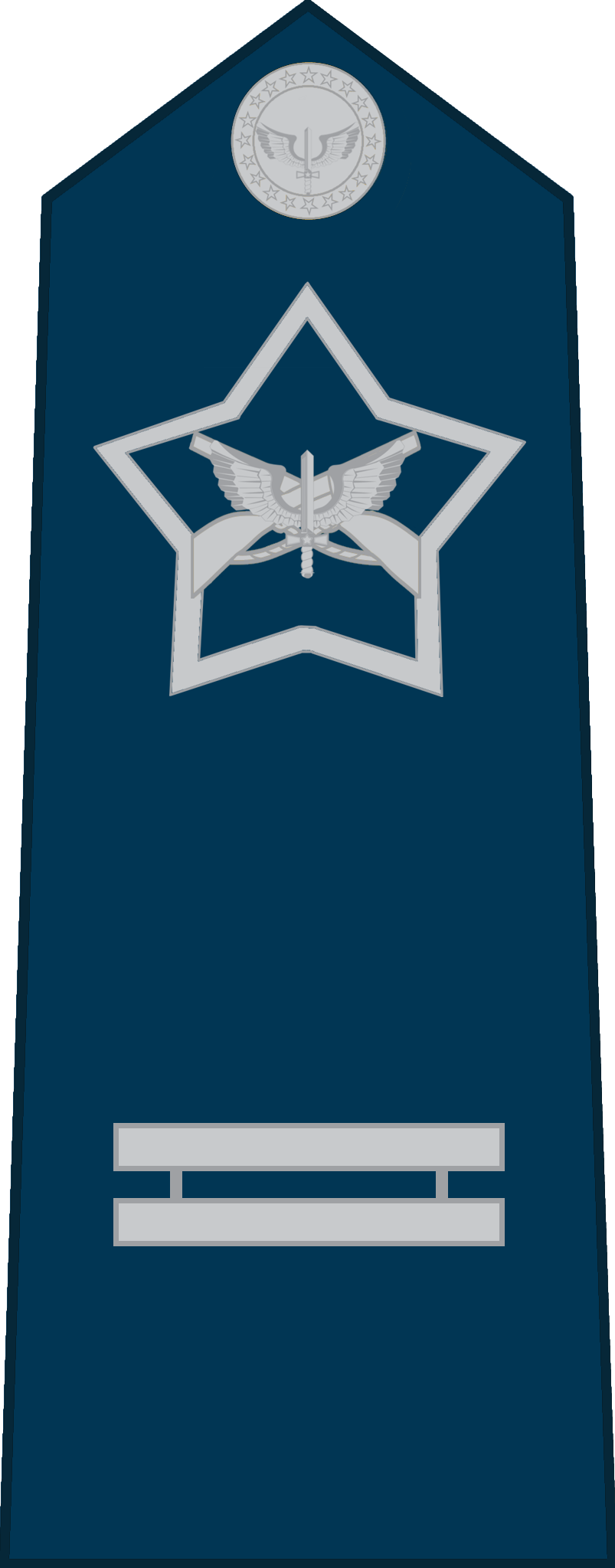
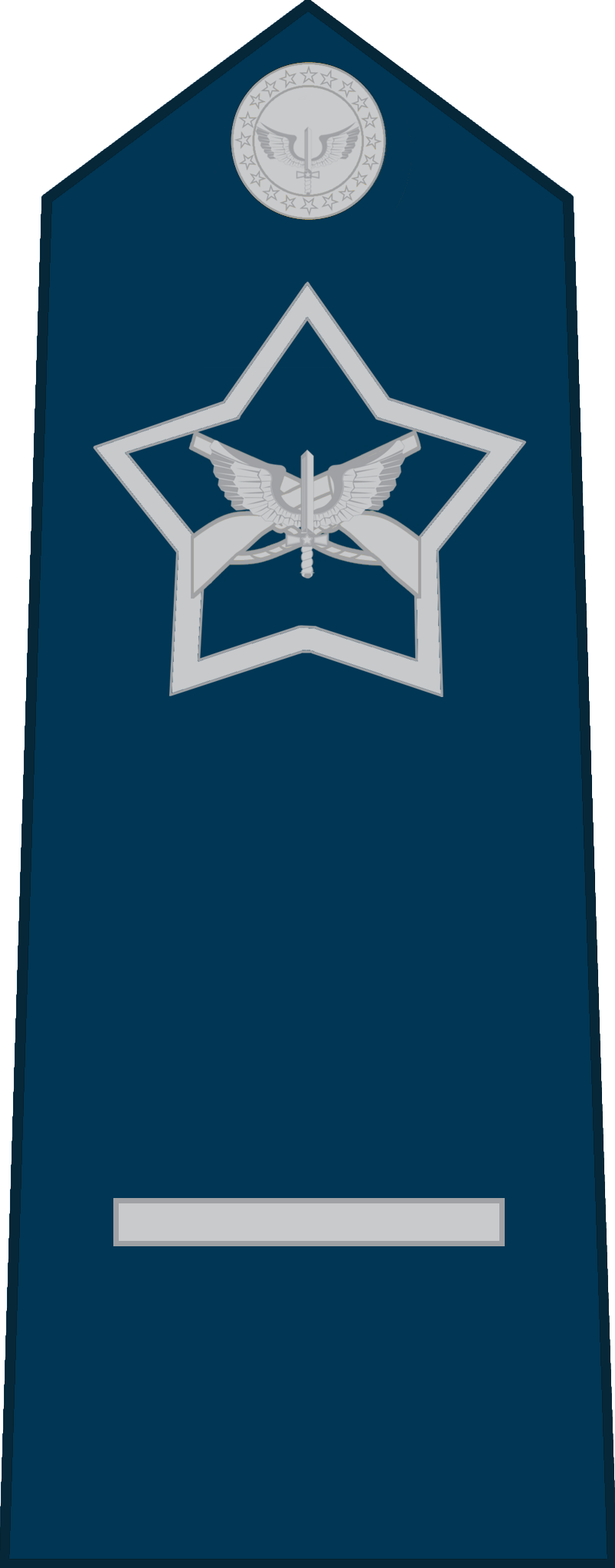
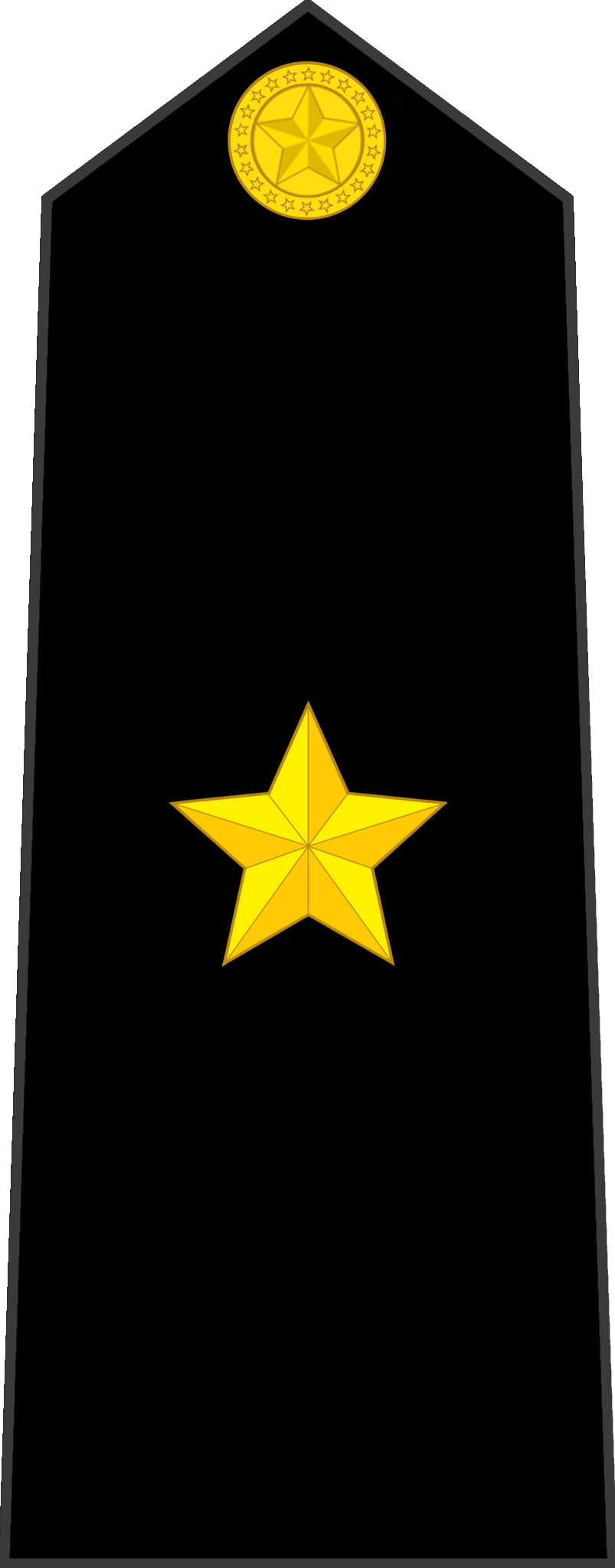
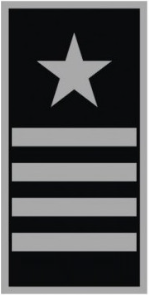
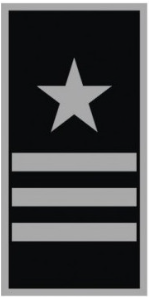
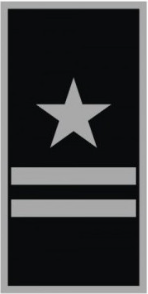
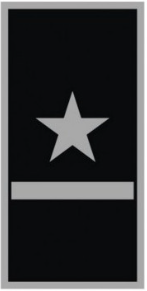
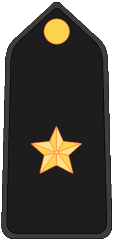
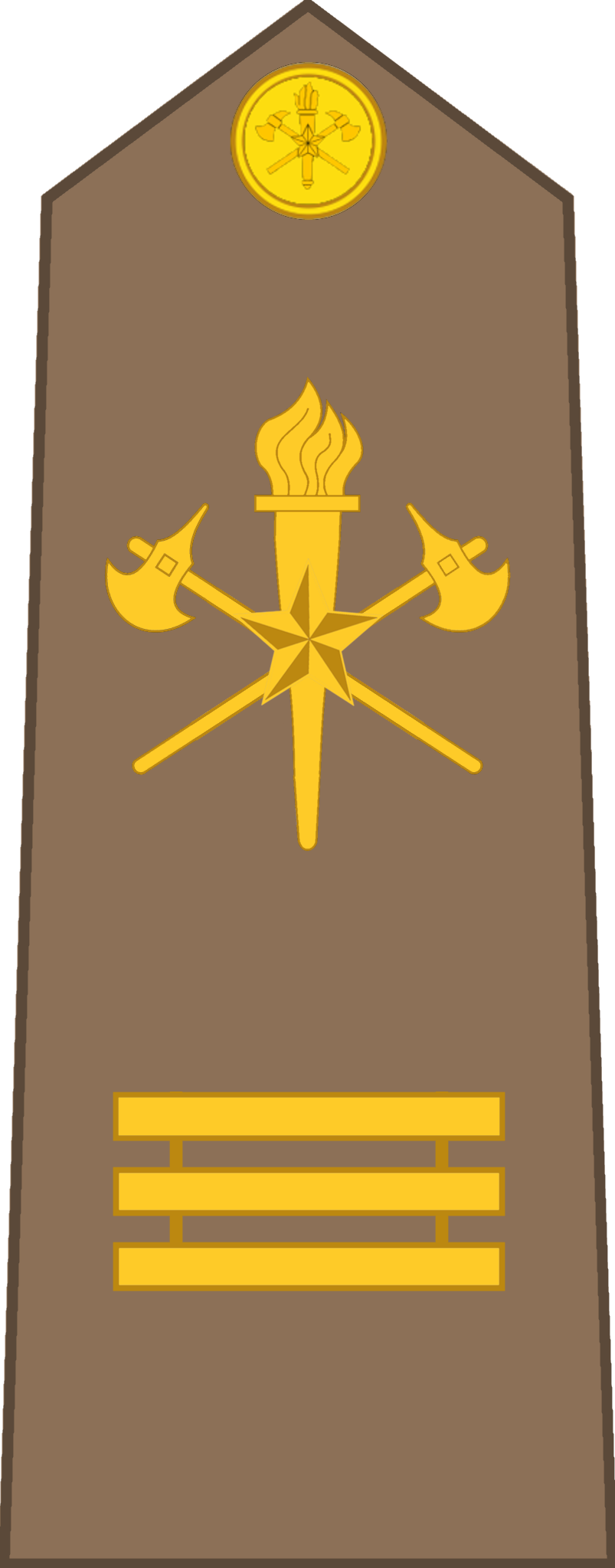
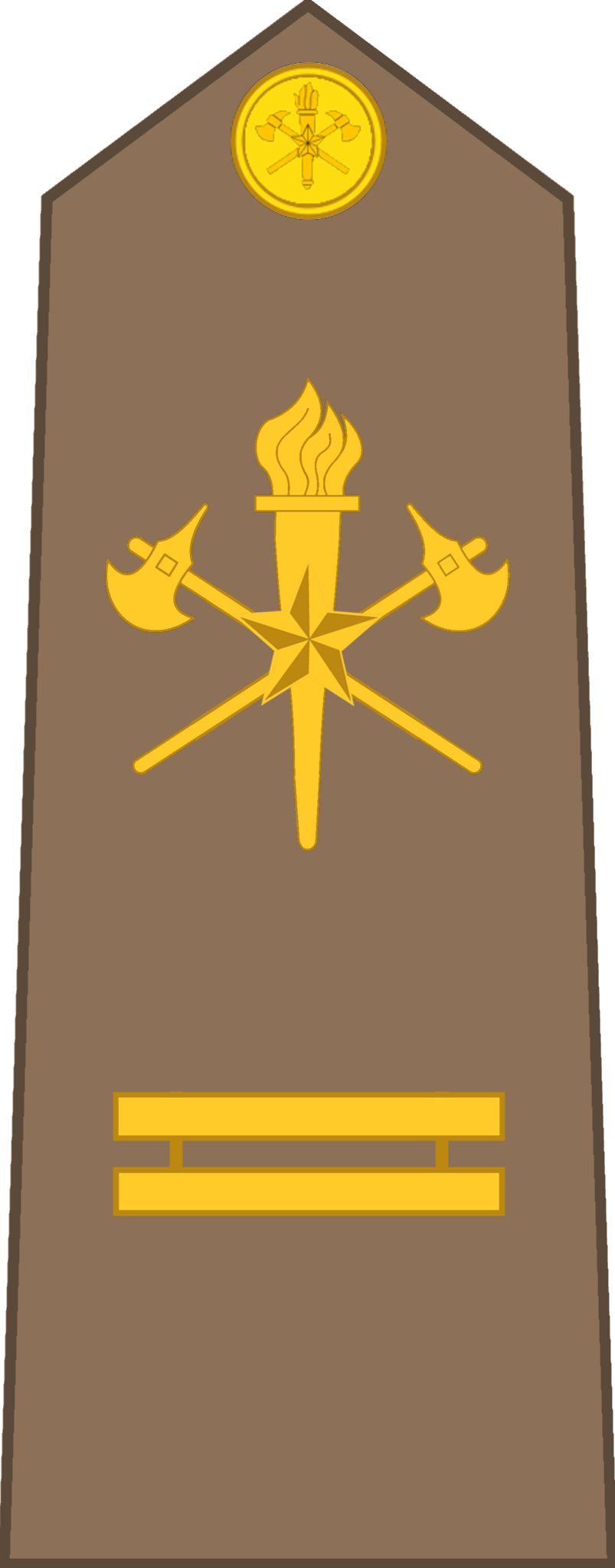
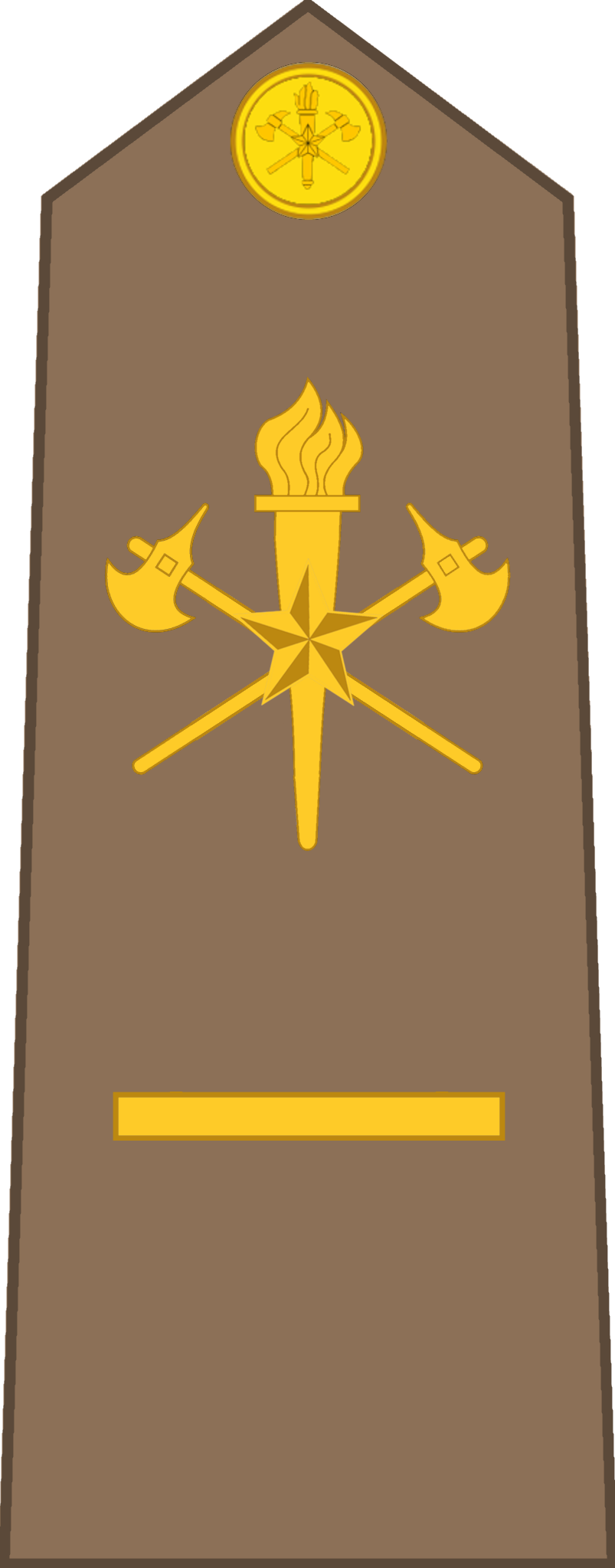
Rank group	Special Student Grade	Junior officer	Student officer/Cadets
Rank group	Special Student Grade	Junior officer	5th year		4th year	3rd year	2nd year	1st year
IME		Aspirante a Oficial
IME		Aspirante a Oficial	Aluno do 5° ano de ativa	Aluno do 5° ano da reserva	Aluno do 4° ano	Aluno do 3° ano	Aluno do 2° ano	Aluno do 1° ano
AMAN		Aspirante a Oficial
AMAN		Aspirante a Oficial			Cadete do 4° ano	Cadete do 3° ano	Cadete do 2° ano	Cadete do 1° ano
CPOR		Aspirante a Oficial
CPOR		Aspirante a Oficial			Aluno CPOR
EsFCEx
EsFCEx	Primeiro-Tenente Aluno (Sleeve)
EN							Aspirante do 2° ano	Aspirante do 1° ano
EN		Guarda-Marinha			Aspirante do 4° ano	Aspirante do 3° ano	Aspirante do 2° ano	Aspirante do 1° ano
EN		Guarda-Marinha (Marines)			Aspirante do 4° ano (Marines)	Aspirante do 3° ano (Marines)	Aspirante do 2° ano	Aspirante do 1° ano
Rank group	Special Student Grade	Junior officer	Student officer/Cadets
Rank group	Special Student Grade	Junior officer	5th year		4th year	3rd year	2nd year	1st year
AFA		Aspirante
AFA		Aspirante			Cadete 4° ano	Cadete 3° ano	Cadete 2° ano	Cadete 1° ano
CPORaer		Aspirante
CPORaer		Aspirante					Aluno 2° periodo	Aluno 1° periodo
Brazilian Military Police
Brazilian Military Police		Aspirante a oficial			Aluno-oficial 4° ano (APMBB)	Aluno-oficial 3° ano (APMBB)	Aluno-oficial 2° ano (APMBB)	Aluno-oficial 1° ano (APMBB)
(Brazil) Military Firefighters Corps
(Brazil) Military Firefighters Corps		Aspirante				Aluno-oficial 3° ano	Aluno-oficial 2° ano	Aluno-oficial 1° ano
Rank group	Special Student Grade	Junior officer	5th year		4th year	3rd year	2nd year	1st year
Rank group	Special Student Grade	Junior officer	Student officer/Cadets

==== Preparatory school ====
The Brazilian system includes a preparatory stage before entering the military academy. Known as preparatory schools, students who graduate from these institutions are guaranteed access to their respective academies, as follows:

- Army: Brazilian Army Preparatory School of Cadets (EsPCEx) (1 year) provides a guaranteed place at AMAN.
- Navy: Naval College (CN) (3 years, combined with high school) provides a place at EN.
- Air Force: Preparatory School for Air Cadets (EPCAr) (3 years, combined with high school) provides a place at AFA.

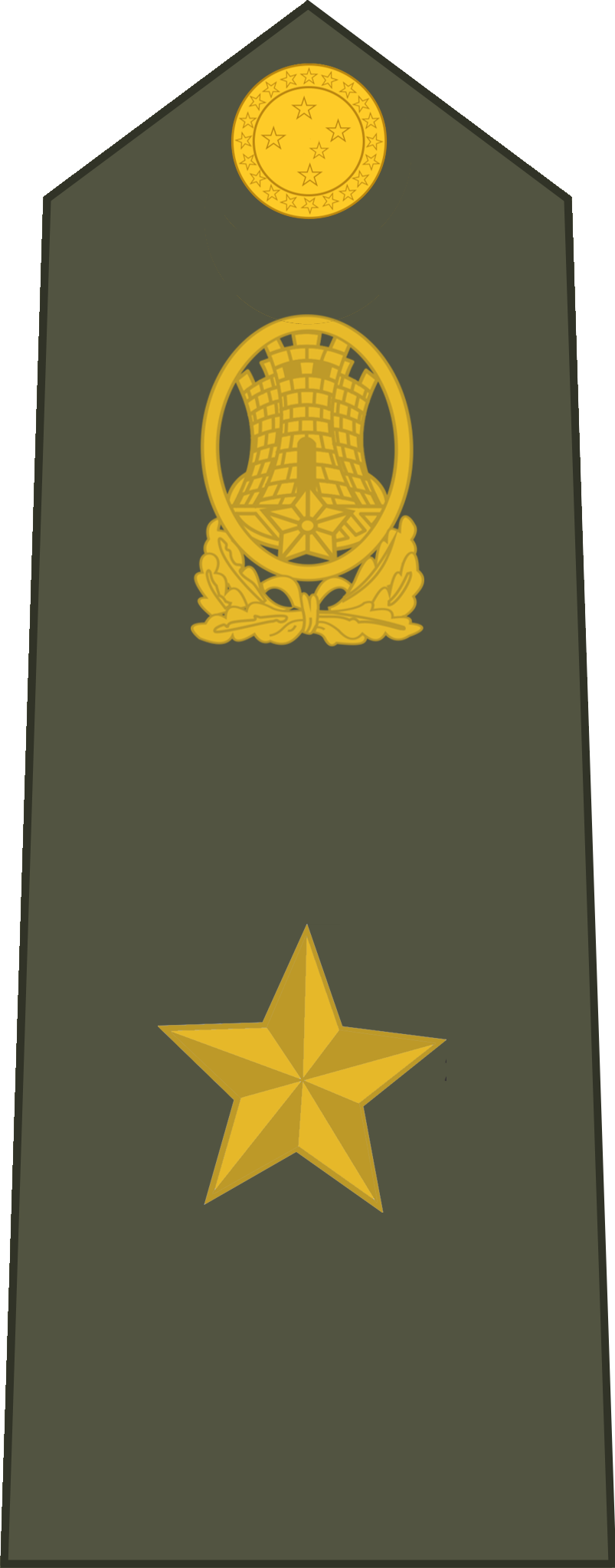
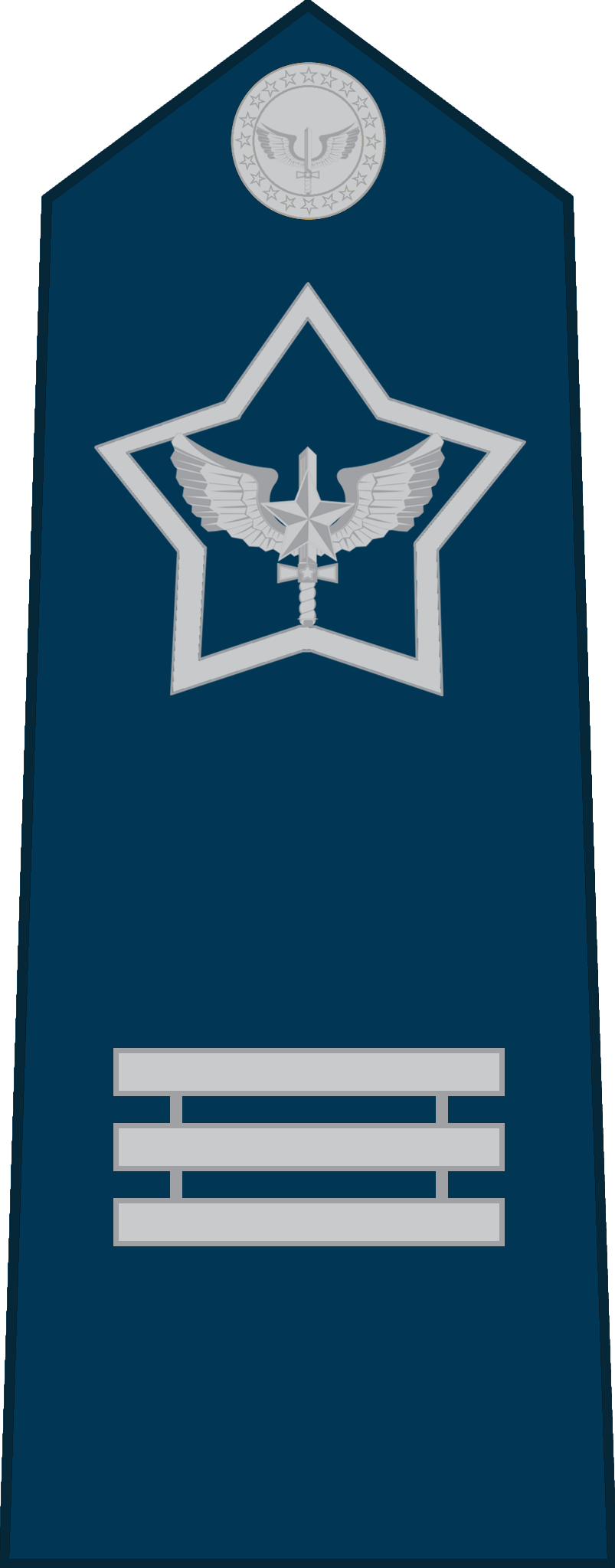
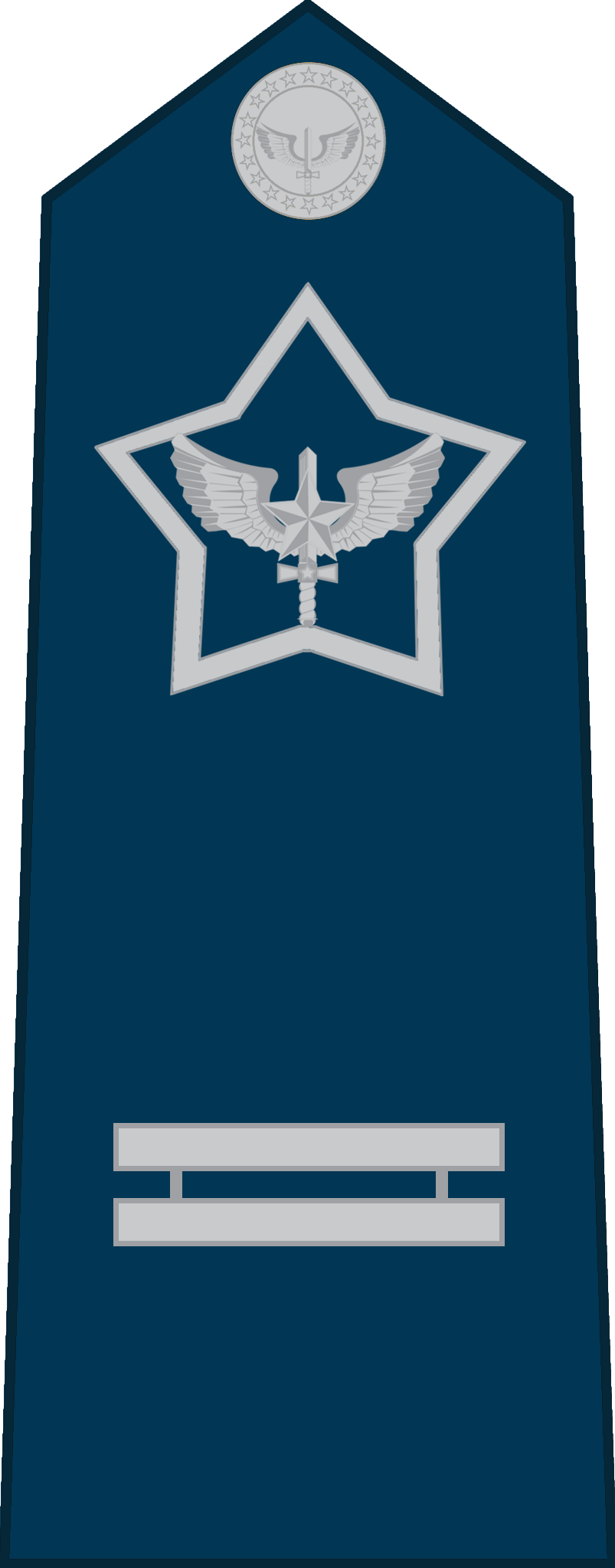
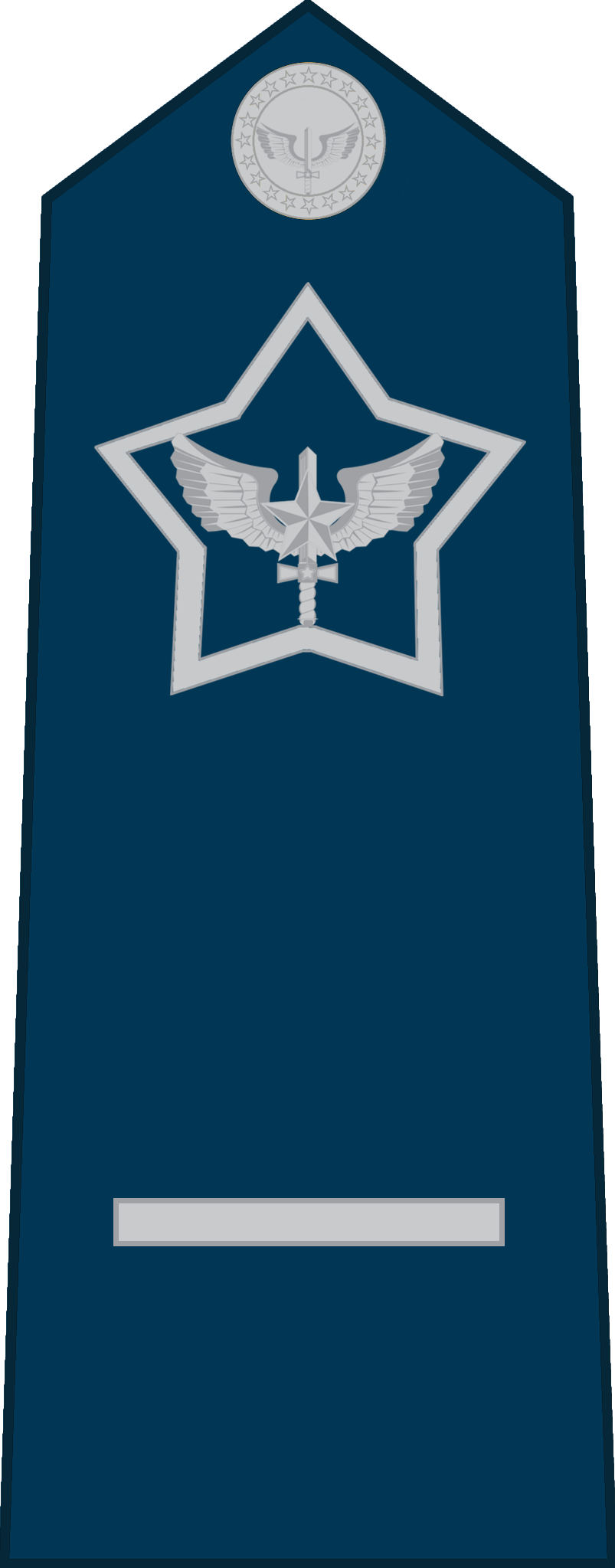
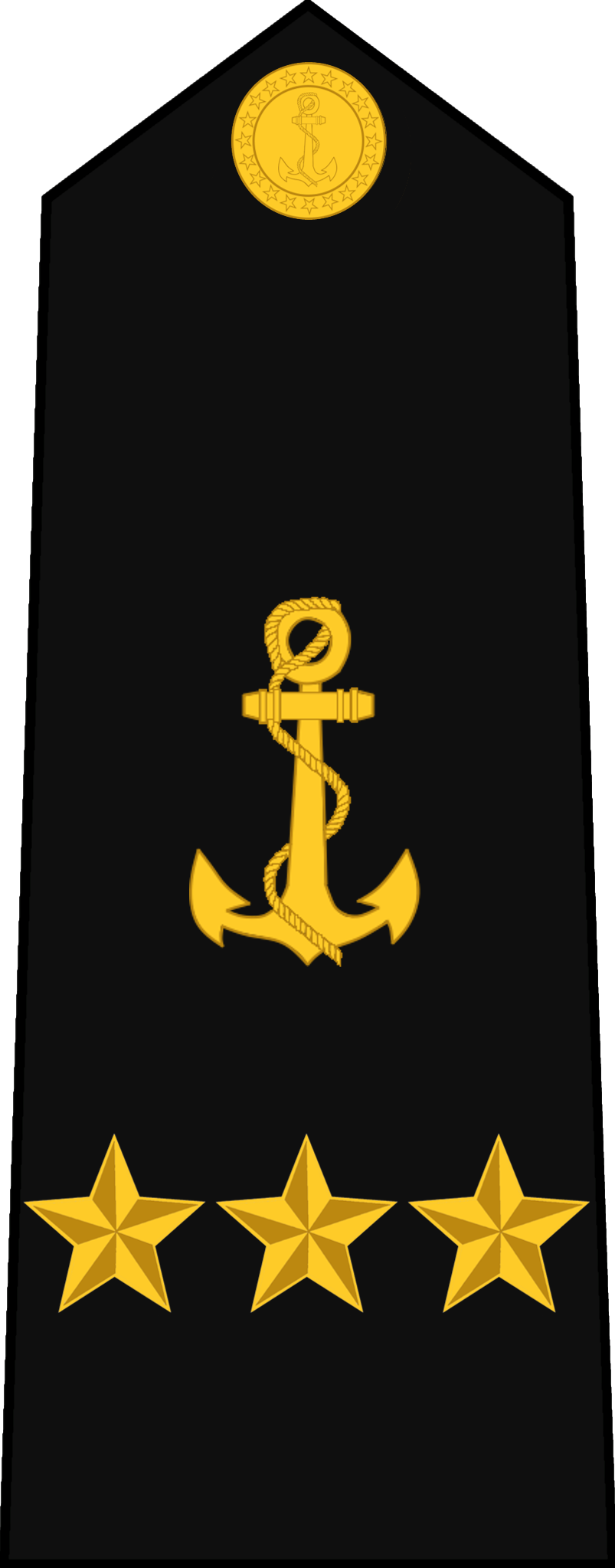
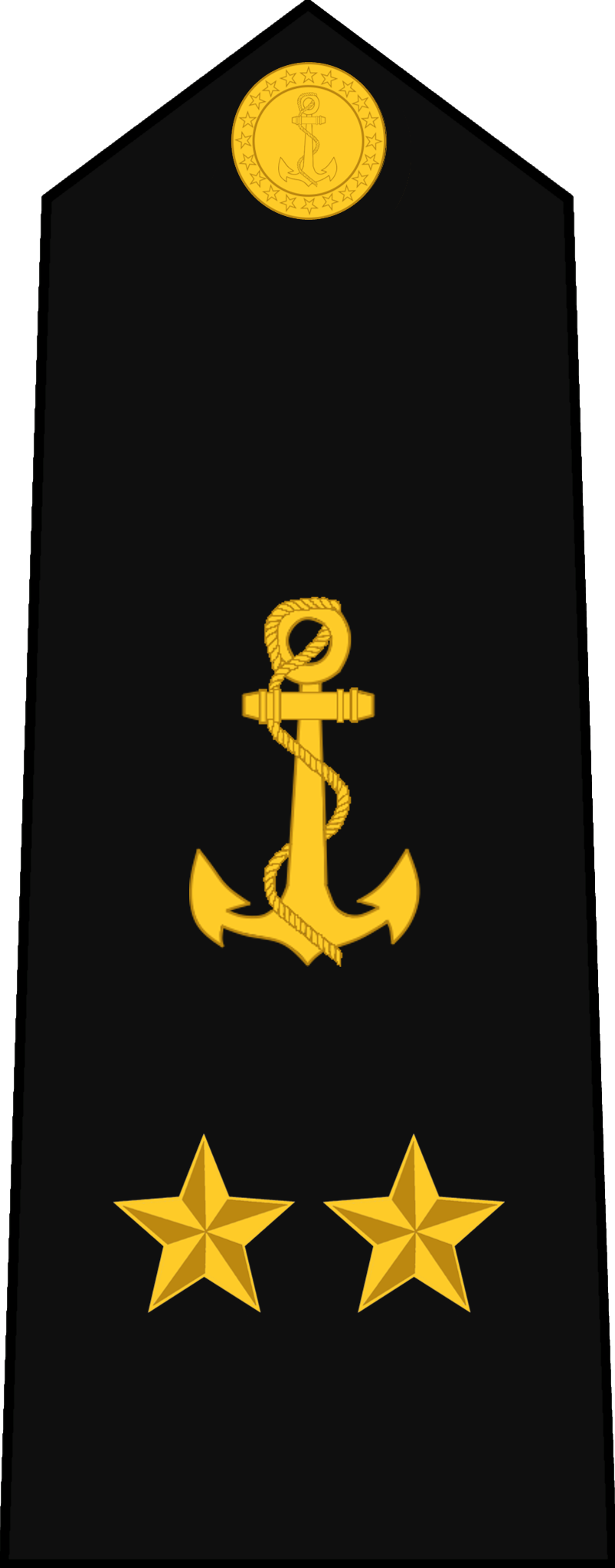
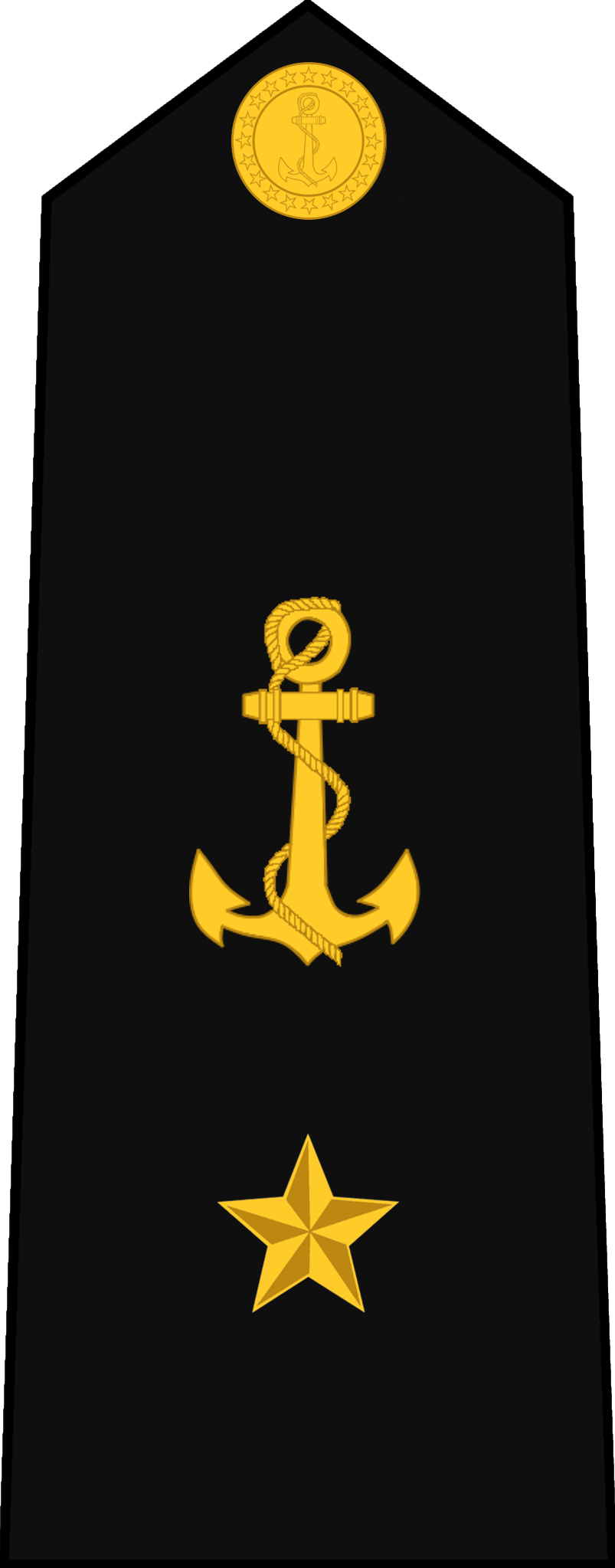
Rank group	Cadets (preparatory schools)
EsPCEx
EsPCEx	Aluno EsPCEx
EPCAr
EPCAr	Aluno EPCAR 3°Ano	Aluno EPCAR 2°Ano	Aluno EPCAR 1°Ano
CN
CN	Aluno CN 3° Ano	Aluno CN 2° Ano	Aluno CN 1° Ano

== Non-commissioned Officers ==
The rank insignia of non-commissioned officers and enlisted personnel.

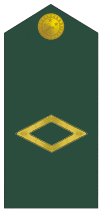
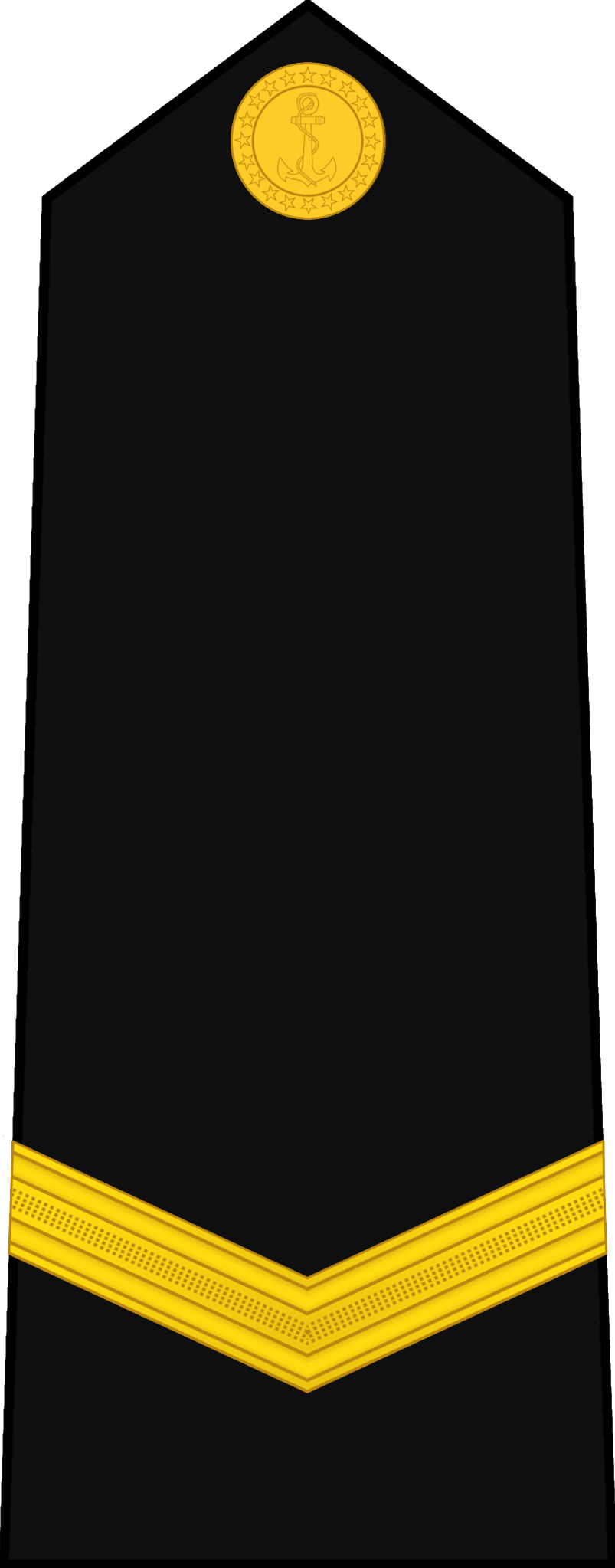
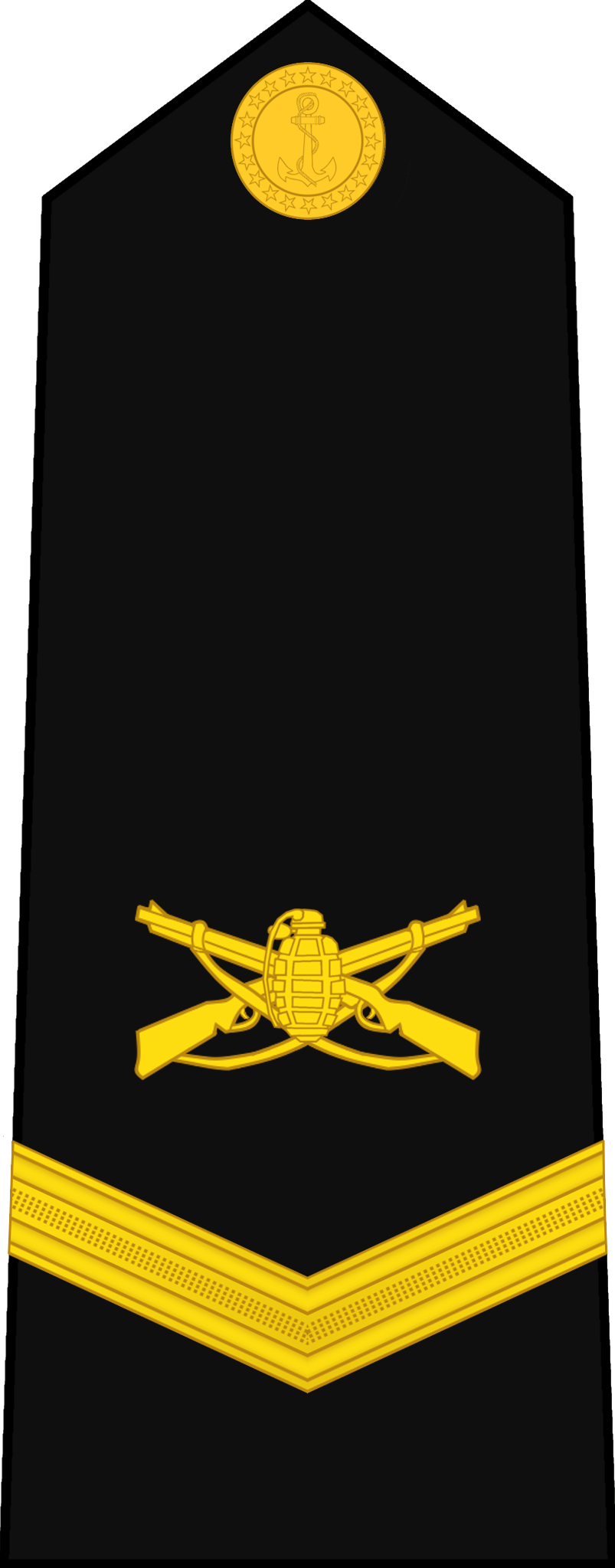
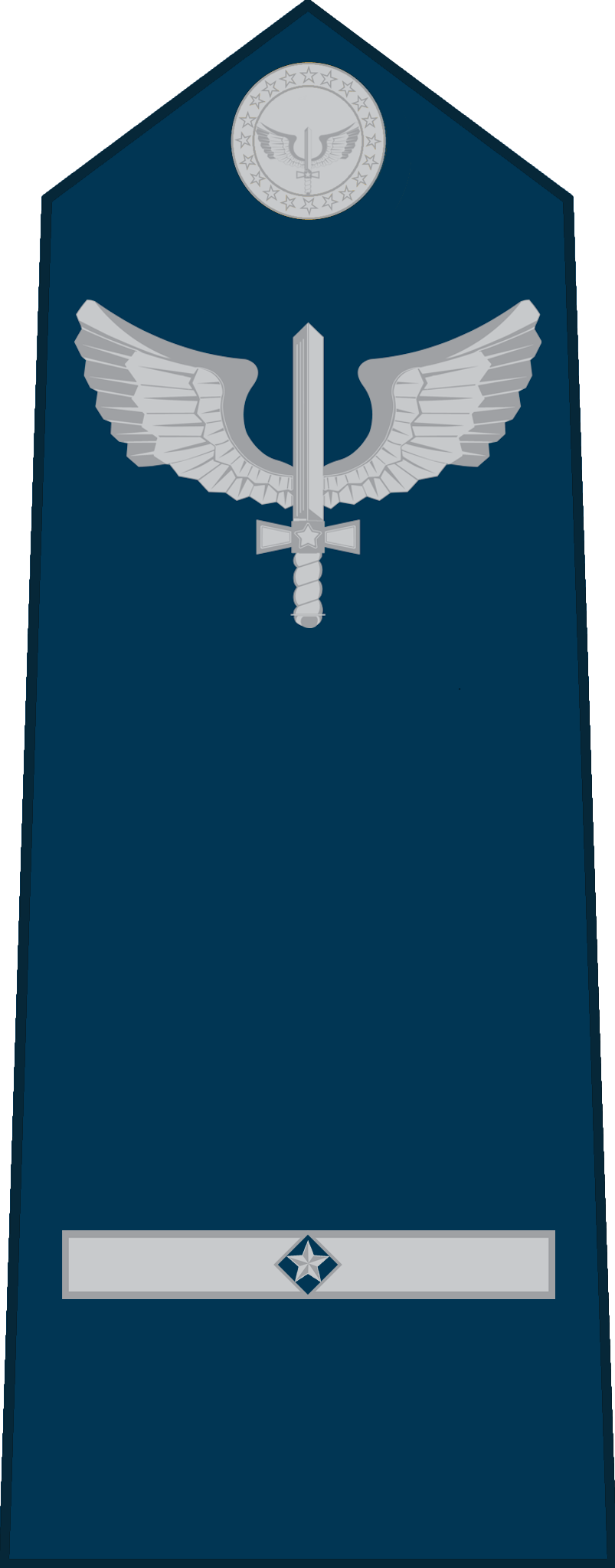
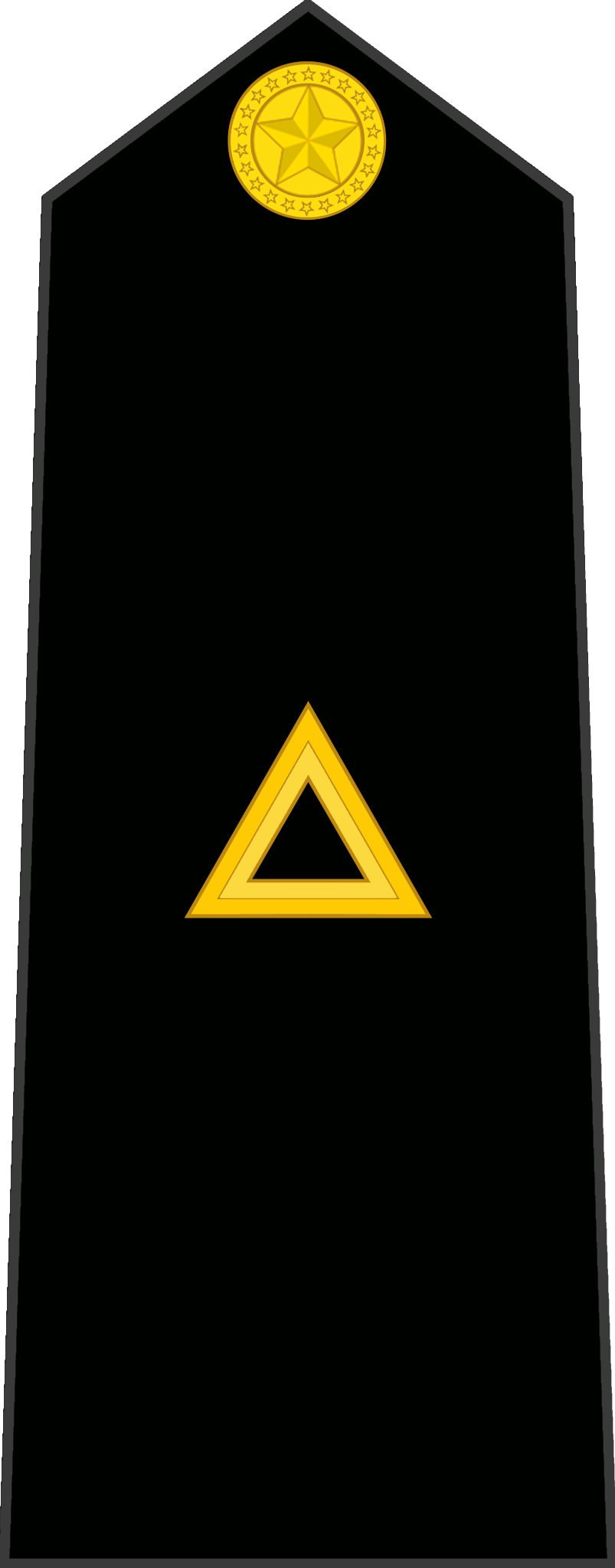
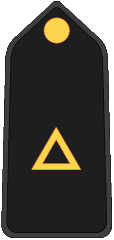
Rank group	Senior NCOs				Junior NCOs		Enlisted
Brazilian Army
Brazilian Army	Subtenente	Primeiro-sargento	Segundo-sargento	Terceiro-sargento	Taifeiro-mor	Cabo	Taifeiro primeira classe		Taifeiro segunda classe	Soldado
Brazilian Navy
Brazilian Navy	Suboficial	Primeiro-sargento	Segundo-sargento	Terceiro-sargento	Cabo		Marinheiro
Brazilian Marine Corps
Brazilian Marine Corps	Suboficial fuzileiro naval	Primeiro-sargento fuzileiro naval	Segundo-sargento fuzileiro naval	Terceiro-sargento fuzileiro naval	Cabo fuzileiro naval		Soldado fuzileiro naval
Brazilian Air Force
Brazilian Air Force	Suboficial	Primeiro-Sargento	Segundo-Sargento	Terceiro-Sargento	Cabo	Taifeiro-mor	Soldado	Taifeiro primeira classe	Soldado segunda classe	Taifeiro segunda classe
Brazilian Military Police
Brazilian Military Police	Subtenente	Primeiro-sargento	Segundo-sargento	Terceiro-sargento	Cabo		Soldado primeira classe		Soldado segunda classe
(Brazil) Military Firefighters Corps
(Brazil) Military Firefighters Corps	Subtenente	Primeiro-sargento	Segundo-sargento	Terceiro-sargento	Cabo		Bombeiro primeira classe		Bombeiro segunda classe
Rank group	Senior NCOs				Junior NCOs		Enlisted

=== Students non-commissioned officers ===
Future NCOs are not classified as Cadets but rather as Students (Portuguese: Aluno). Additionally, the term "Student" is followed by the rank for which they are being trained. For example, for corporals: Student-Corporal; and for sergeants: Student-Sergeant.

The academies responsible for NCO training in each branch are:

- Army: ESA (The course lasts for two years, and graduates are commissioned as Third Sergeants)
- Navy: EAM and CIAA (It lasts 2 months to be a Sergeant, but you must have completed the Apprentice (11 months) and Corporal (4 Months) courses beforehand to be eligible).
- Air Force: EEAR (The course lasts for two years, and graduates are commissioned as Third Sergeants).

For police forces, each state has its own academies. In São Paulo State, the Escola Superior de Sargentos (ESSgt) can be translated as Sergeants' Advanced School or Higher School for Sergeants.

It is worth mentioning that there are other courses for training sergeants and corporals, as well as advanced training courses. One of these courses is the CFST (Temporary Sergeant Training Course), which allows the NCO to remain in an active military career for a maximum of 8 years.

Students who graduate from sergeant courses can attain the positions of Sub-lieutenant (in the army or police) or Sub-officer (in Navy, Air Force and Marines). However, depending on the NCO's performance and additional courses completed, they may rise to the rank of Captain.

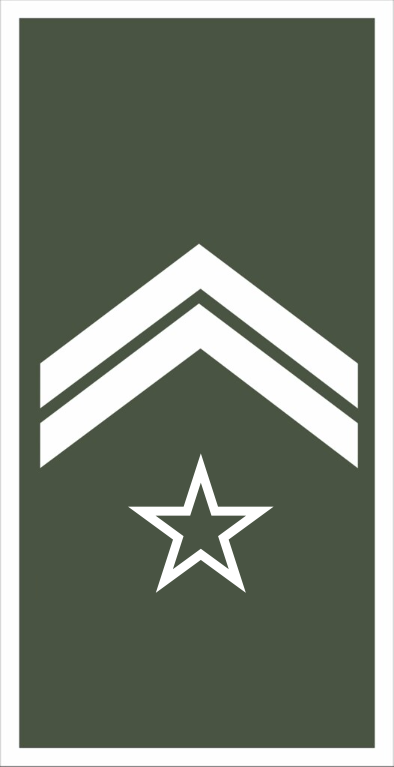
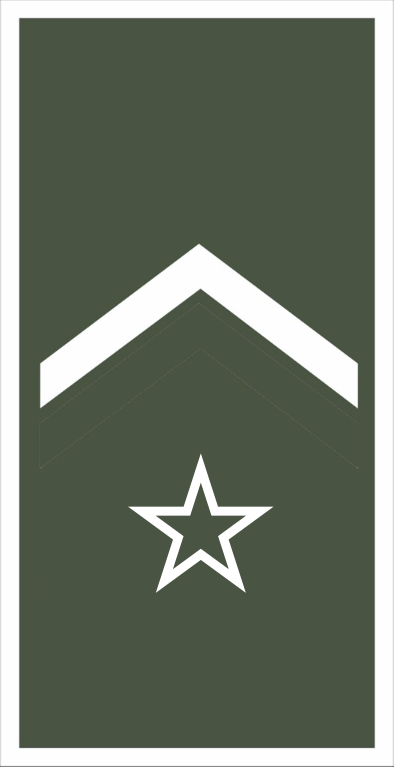
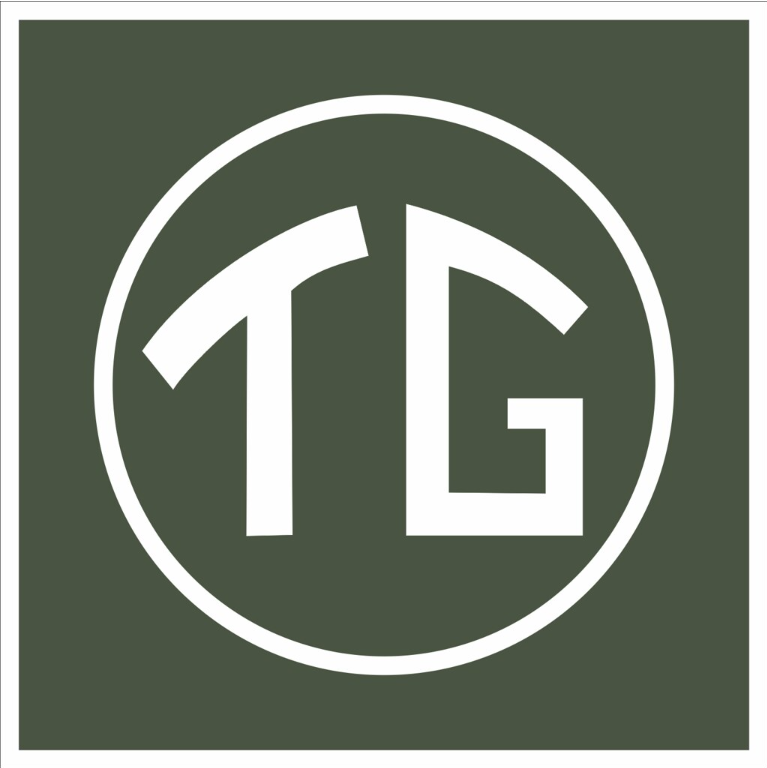
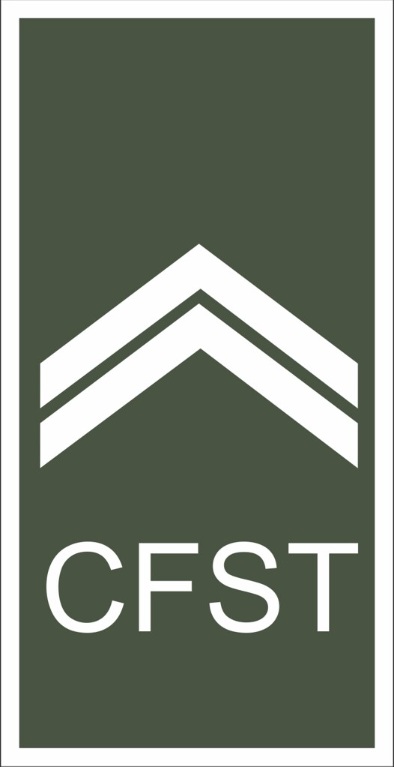
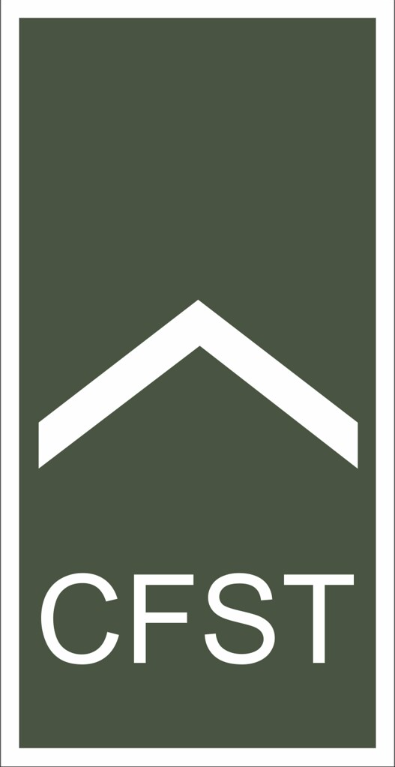
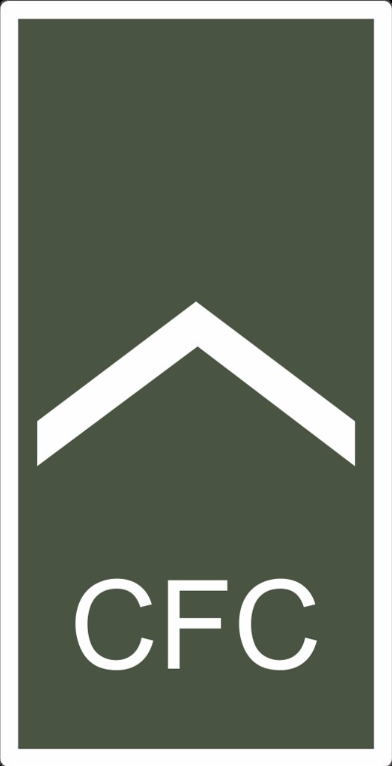
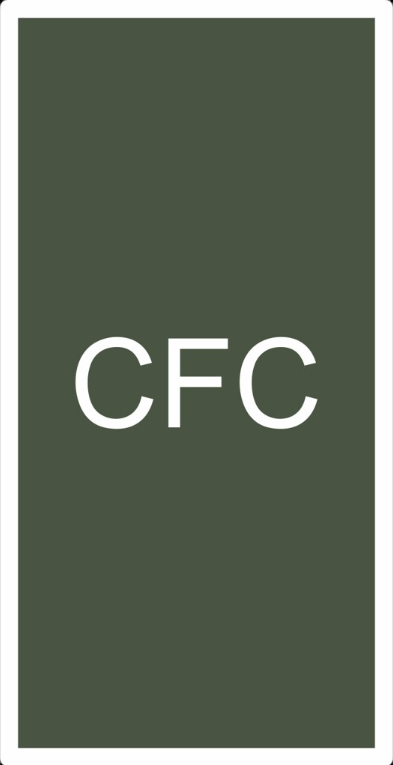
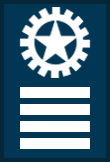
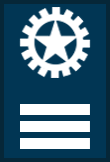
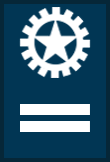
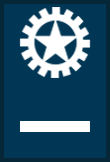
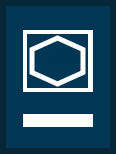
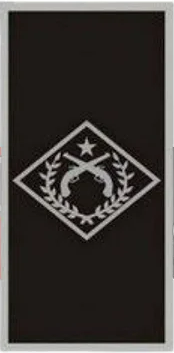
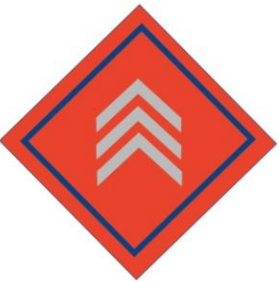
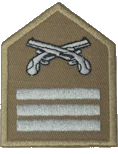
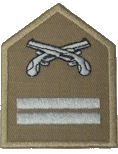
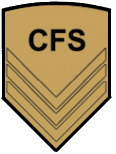
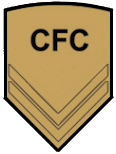
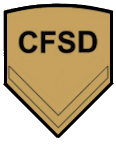
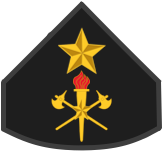
Rank group	Sargeants candidates				Corporal candidates		Soldier candidates
Brazilian Army
Brazilian Army	Aluno-Sargento (ESA) 2°Ano		Aluno-Sargento (ESA) 1°Ano				Atirador (Tiro de Guerra)
Brazilian Army	Aluno-Sargento (CFST)		Aluno-Sargento (CFST)		Aluno-Cabo (CFC)	Aluno-Cabo (CFC)
Brazilian Air Force
Brazilian Air Force	Aluno 4° Período (EEAR)	Aluno 3° Período (EEAR)	Aluno 2° Período (EEAR)	Aluno 1° Período (EEAR)			Aluno-Taifeiro
Brazilian Military Police
Brazilian Military Police	Aluno-Sargento (Essgt) (SP)	Aluno-Sargento (ES)	Aluno-Sargento (SC)		Aluno-Cabo (SC)
Military Firefighters Corps
Military Firefighters Corps	Aluno-Sargento (PB)				Aluno-Cabo (PB)		Aluno-Soldado (PB)	Aluno-Soldado (PR)

== Generalissimo ==
On January 15, 1890, Deodoro da Fonseca was acclaimed by the troops as "Generalíssimo Comandante das Forças de Terra e Mar" (Generalissimo Commandant of the Forces of Land and Sea), thus becoming the only "six-star general officer" in Brazil.

== See also ==
- Military ranks of the Empire of Brazil
- Military ranks of Portugal
