= Corpo de Bombeiros =

Corpo de Bombeiros may refer to:

Brazil

- Firefighters Corps of Acre State
- Firefighters Corps of Paraná State
- Military Firefighters Corps

China

- Fire Services Bureau (Macau)
