= Special Operations Battalion (PMAC) =

Batalhão de Operações Policiais Especiais
- Patch & Beret Badge
- Common name: BOPE
- Motto: Faca na Caveira; Knife in the Skull / Victory Over Death

Agency overview
- Formed: 1990

Jurisdictional structure
- Operations jurisdiction: Acre, Brazil
- Location of the State of Acre in Brazil
- Governing body: Military Police of Acre State

Operational structure
- Agency executive: Lieutenant Colonel Wilman René Gonçalves Alonso, Commander
- Parent agency: Military Police of Rio de Janeiro State

Battalion of Special Police Operations (Portuguese: Batalhão de Operações Especiais - BOPE) is a special operations force of the Military Police of the State of Acre (PMAC), directly subordinated to the General Command.

== History ==
Decree 155 of March 28, 1990, published in the D.O.E. 5,260 / 90, provides for the creation and structuring of the 1st Military Police Battalion, “Battalion José Plácido de Castro”; this structure included the Special Operations companies - (Portuguese: Companhia de Operações Especiais - COE). Created since then, the COE, only in 1996, starts to function, being provisionally installed in the Headquarters of the General Command, as an Independent companies.

In 1998, it was subordinated to the 1st Military Police Battalion, settling on its premises. In 1999, the COE was transferred to its own facilities. With the publication of Law No. 2001 of March 31, 2008, which reorganizes the Basic Structure of the Military Police, regulated by Ordinance No. 425 / DRHM, dated August 5, 2010, COE becomes a Special Operations Battalion - BOPE, Unit directly subordinated to the Operational Policing Command - CPO I.

Since its creation, BOPE, according to the PMAC Restructuring Ordinance, will be employed in special and extraordinary missions of ostensive police and for the preservation of public order within the limits of the state territory.

The organizational structure of BOPE comprises the following Subunits:

- Special Operations companies - COE,
- Riot Control companies
- Dog Policing companies.

== Duties ==
The BOPE of the Military Police of Acre, is the specialized unit of the State to intervene in critical events involving hostage rescue, rural operations, shock operations and other specific missions.

In addition to being the creator, diffuser and maintainer of all operational doctrine of the local military police, it is the troop created and maintained to provide operational support to the other PMAC Units, being, therefore, the last one in the escalation of force to the convenience of employment by the High Command Rank of the Corporation.

== Ranks and insignia ==
Title	Insignia
Colonel	
Lieutenant Colonel	
Major	
Captain	
First Lieutenant	
Second Lieutenant	
Sub-Lieutenant	
First Sergeant	
Second Sergeant	
Third Sergeant	
Corporal	
Private "A Class"	

== See also ==
- Acre State
- Military Police of Brazil
- Military Firefighters Corps (Brazil)
- Brazilian Federal Police
- Federal Highway Police
- Brazilian Civil Police
- Brazilian Armed Forces
- Military Police
- Gendarmerie
- Military Police of Rio de Janeiro State
- Pacifying Police Unit
- GATE and ROTA (São Paulo Military Police)
- National Force of Public Safety (Brazilian federal special response unit)
- List of police tactical units
