= Military Police of Acre State =

Auxiliary police of the Brazilian state of Acre

Military Police of Acre State Polícia Militar do Estado do Acre
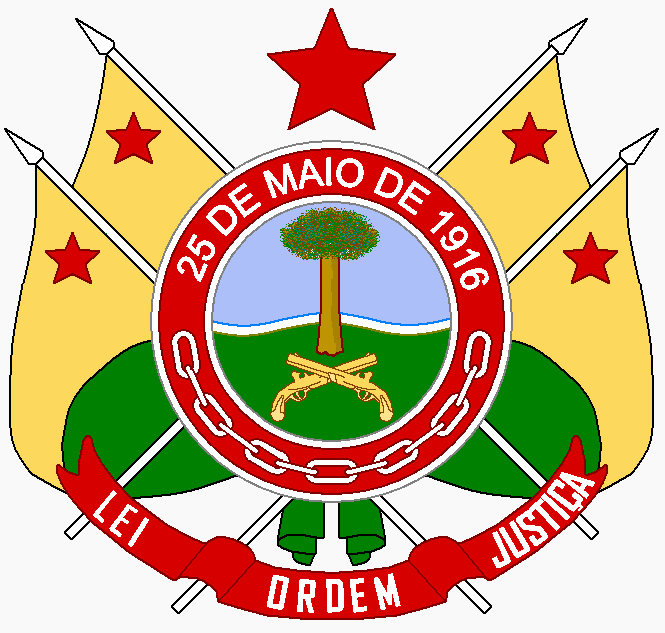
- Abbreviation: PMAC

Agency overview
- Formed: May 25, 1916

Jurisdictional structure
- Operations jurisdiction: Acre, Brazil
- Map of police jurisdiction.
- Constituting instrument: Article 42 of Constitution of Brazil
- General nature: Gendarmerie

Operational structure
- Headquarters: Rio Branco

The Military Police of Acre State (Portuguese: Polícia Militar do Estado do Acre – PMAC) are the preventive police force of the state of Acre. In Brazil, Military Police are reserve and ancillary forces of the Brazilian Army, and part of the System of Public Security and Brazilian Social Protection. Its members are called "State Military" personnel.

== Organization ==
The Military Police of Acre State is formed by battalions, companies, and platoons. The battalions (Portuguese: Batalhão de Polícia Militar – BPM) and independent companies (Portuguese: Companhia Independente de Polícia Militar – CIPM) are organized into Regional Commands (Portuguese: Comandos Regionais de Polícia Militar – CRPM). These Commands are in major urban centers, and their battalions and companies are distributed according to population density in cities.

== History ==
The official history is that from 1904 to 1916, public security in the Acrean Territory was exercised by the Brazilian Army. On May 25, 1916, the Federal Government, through Decree No. 12.077, created the Regional Companies, with the objective of maintaining public order in each Department, including the then newly created Alto / Tarauacá. Regional Companies are considered to be the embryo that gave rise to today's Military Police.

The 1964 coup solved the problem, according to the ideas of the national security ideology, seeking the creation of an auxiliary military force, trained to respond to the guerrilla acts unleashed by organizations that challenged, through the armed struggle, the dictatorship then established.

The Military Police replaced, say, the "Public Forces" and the "Civil Guards", those in popular confrontations and those in preventive policing, under the direct control of the Army.

This is how Decree-Law 667, of July 2, 1969, assigned to the Ministry of the Army the control and coordination of the Military Police through the Army's General Staff throughout the national territory, by the armies and military commands of areas in the respective jurisdictions (sic) by the military regions in the national territories, the position of inspector general of the Military Police being performed by a brigadier general, in active service.

Due to lack of structure, the PMAC only came to be concretely installed on March 31, 1974. It is worth mentioning that for the purpose of commemorating his birthday, Law No. 812 of December 5, 1984, established the date of May 25, 1916, as the initial mark of PMAC.

== Mission and organization ==
The PMAC's primary mission is to deter and control crime throughout the state, often by patrolling streets or public facilities in cities, such as schools. However, it is also responsible for monitoring the open lands, forests, rivers, and highways of the Acre, and will even carry out reconnaissance missions, referred to as P2.

The constitutional attributions of the Military Police of Acre State are provided for in § 5 of Article 144 of the Constitution, "the military police responsible for the ostensive policing and the maintenance of public order". In addition:

- In the fight against organized crime, through operations to catch criminals or seizure of weapons, drugs or contraband.
- Providing direct services to the population, helping to transport patients, the orientation of people in difficulty, the intervention of domestic disputes, the routing of the poor to the agencies responsible for sanitation problems, housing
- In specialized policing in tourist areas, stadiums, major events and festivals.
- The supervision and control of the vehicle fleet in integrated actions with other public agencies.
- The preservation of flora, fauna and the environment through specialized battalion.
- In the security service forums of Justice in municipalities throughout the state.
- In support of court officers in repossession cases and other court orders with risk.
- The security of the executive authorities, the legislature and the judiciary.
- Security of witnesses and people under threat.
- In support of public, state and municipal agencies in activities such actions with the population of street and dealing with children and adolescents at social risk.

== Special Units ==
- Special Operations Battalion (PMAC) (Portuguese: Batalhão de Operações Especiais – BOPE)
- Riot Control companies
- Battalion of Environmental Police (Portuguese: Batalhão de Polícia Ambiental – BPA)
- Transit Battalion – (Portuguese: Batalhão de Polícia de Trânsito – BPTRAN)

== Administrative Commands ==
- Teaching and Instruction Dept – Diretoria de Ensino e Instrução
- Human Resources Dept. – Diretoria de Pessoal
- Computer Science Dept. – Diretoria de Informática
- Intelligence Dept. – Diretoria de Inteligência
- Social Promotion Dept. – Diretoria de Promoção Social
- Logistic Support Dept. – Diretoria de Apoio Logístico
- Financial Dept. – Diretoria de Finanças
- Internal affairs (law enforcement) – Corregedoria de Polícia

An internal organization which investigates Police Excesses.

== Ranks and insignia ==
Officers

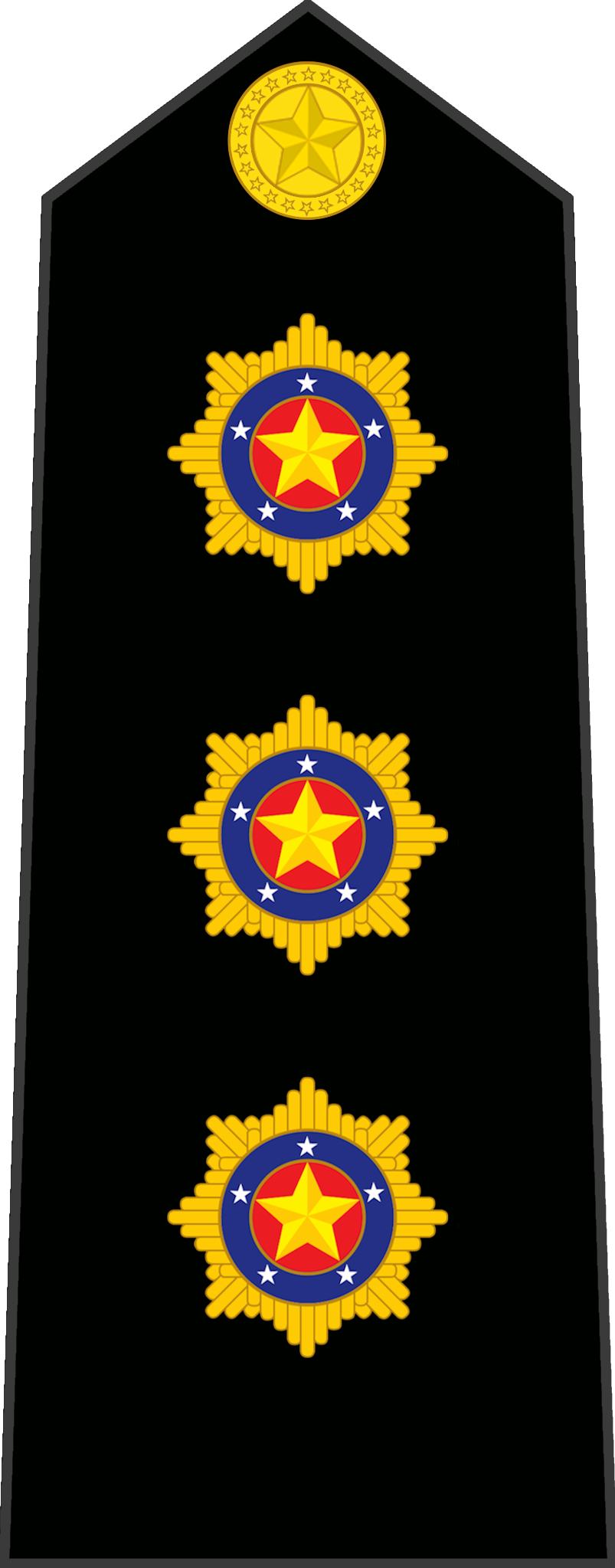
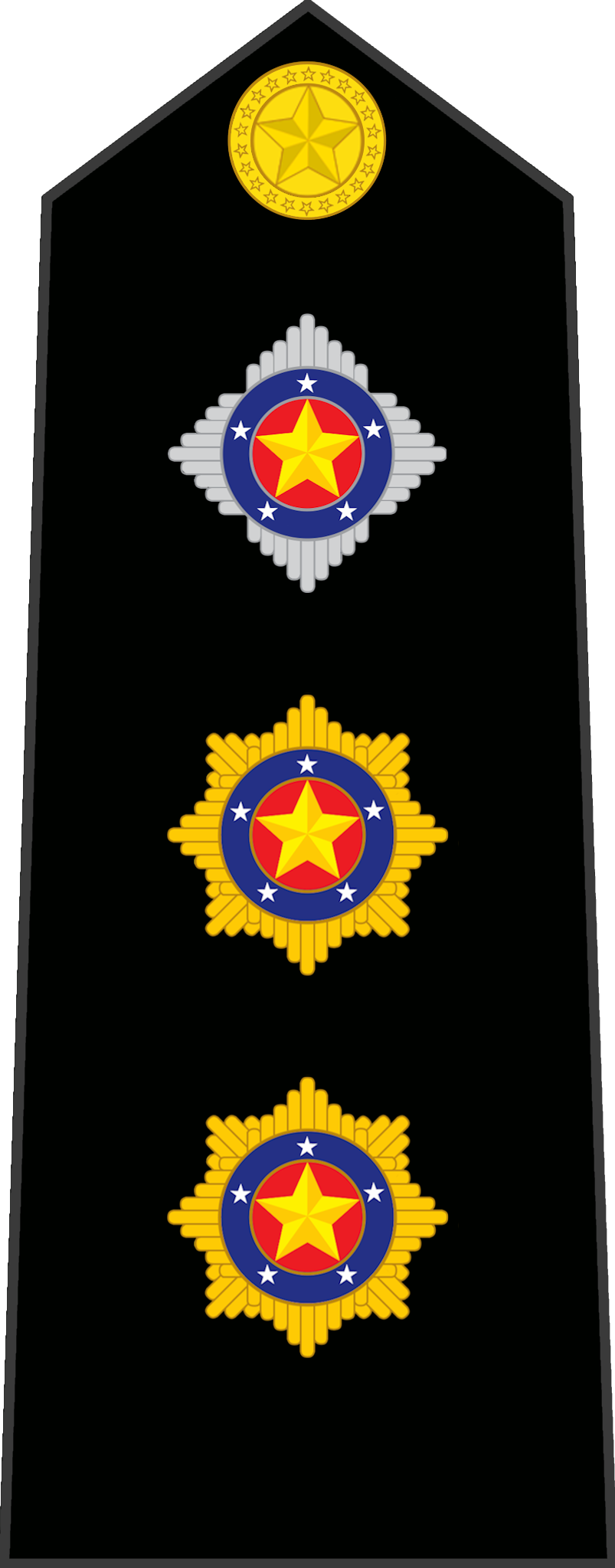
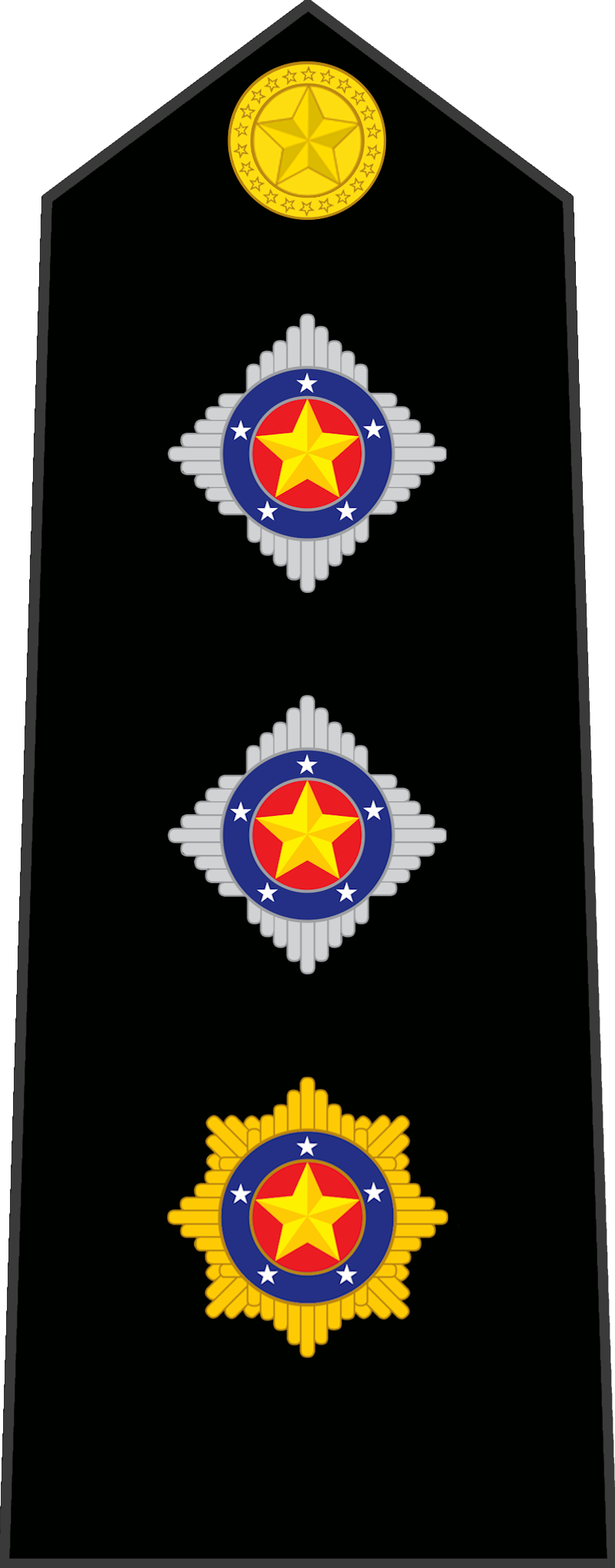
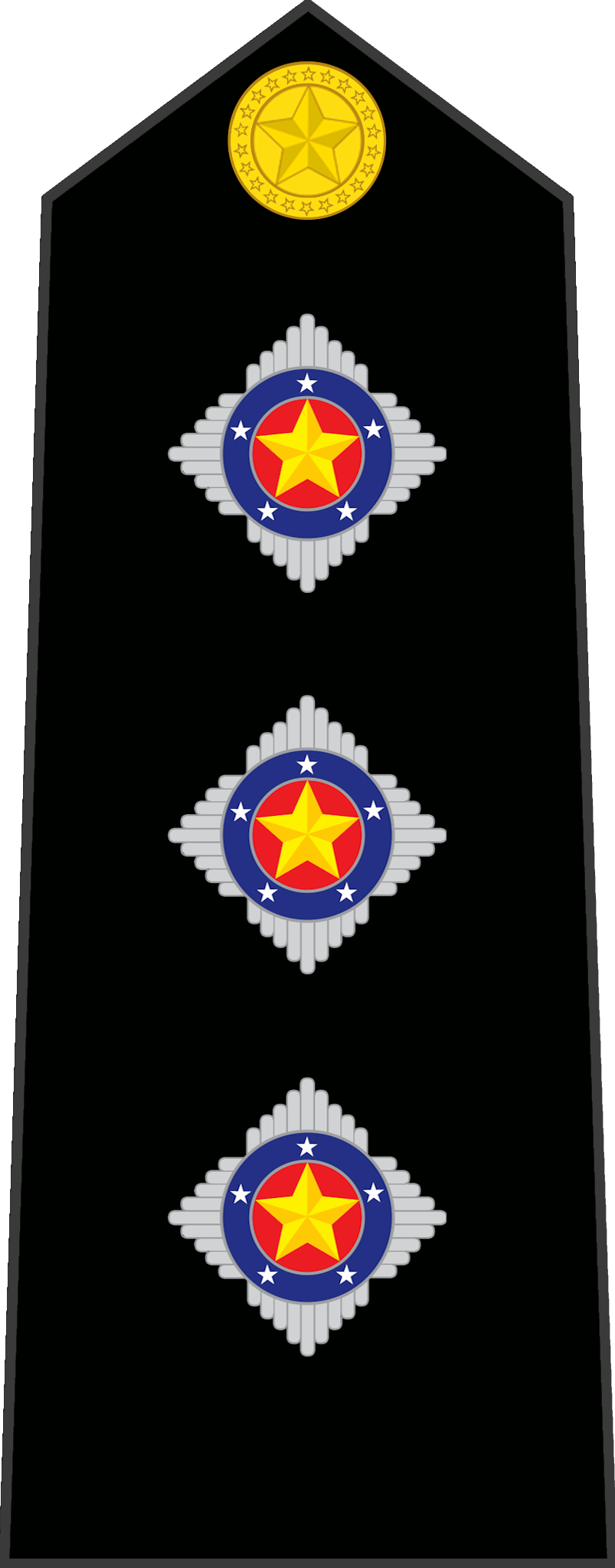
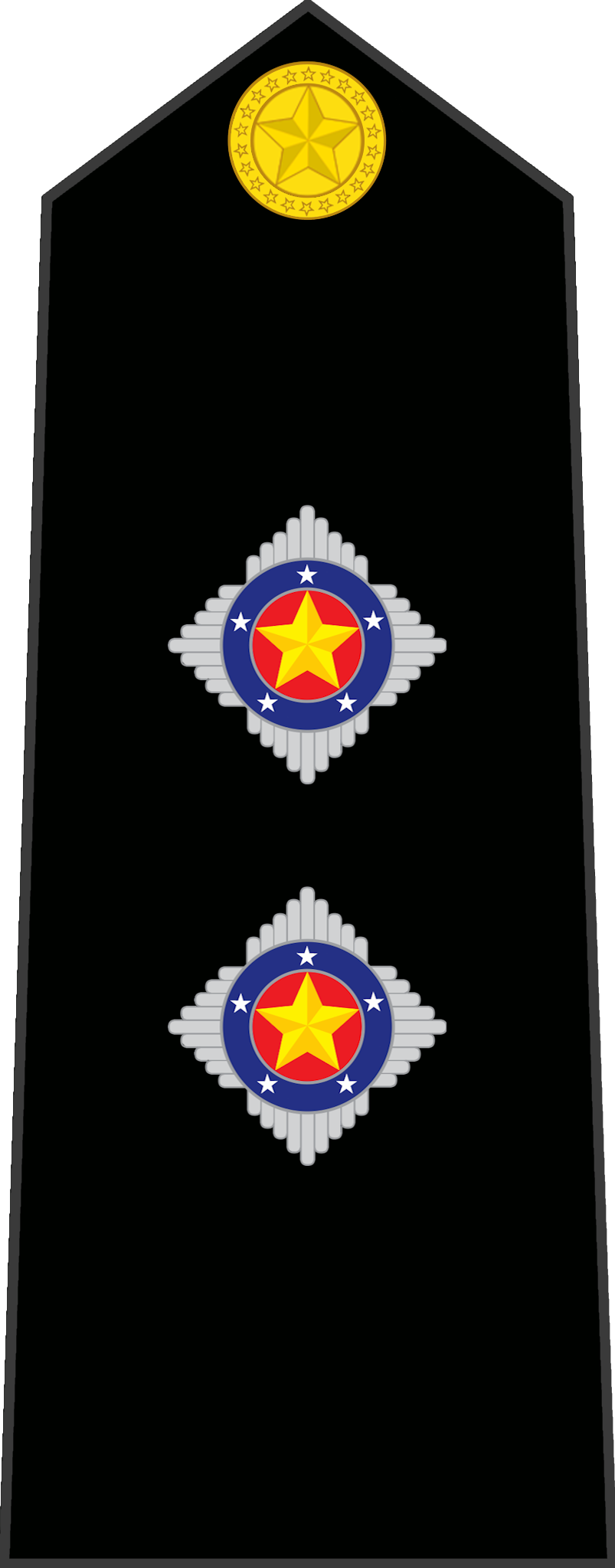
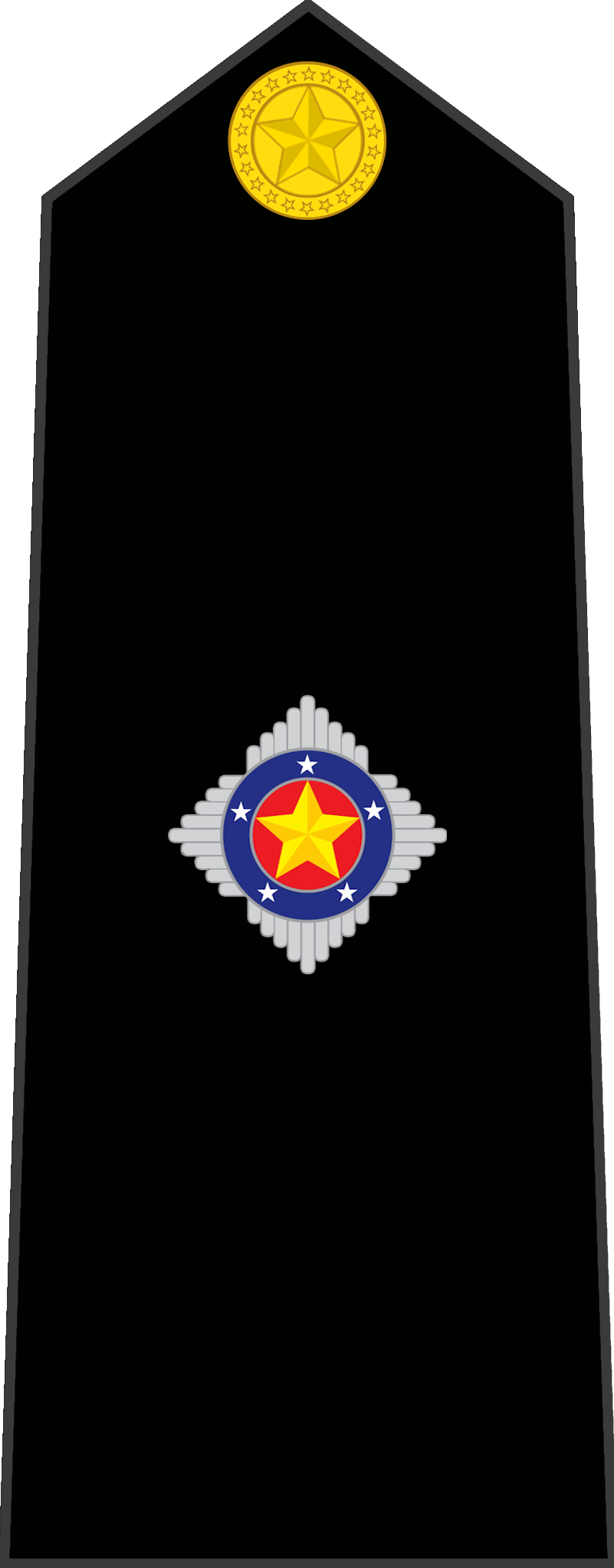
Rank group	General / flag officers	Senior officers			Junior officers
Brazilian Military Police
Brazilian Military Police		Coronel	Tenente-coronel	Major	Capitão	Primeiro tenente	Segundo tenente

Enlisted

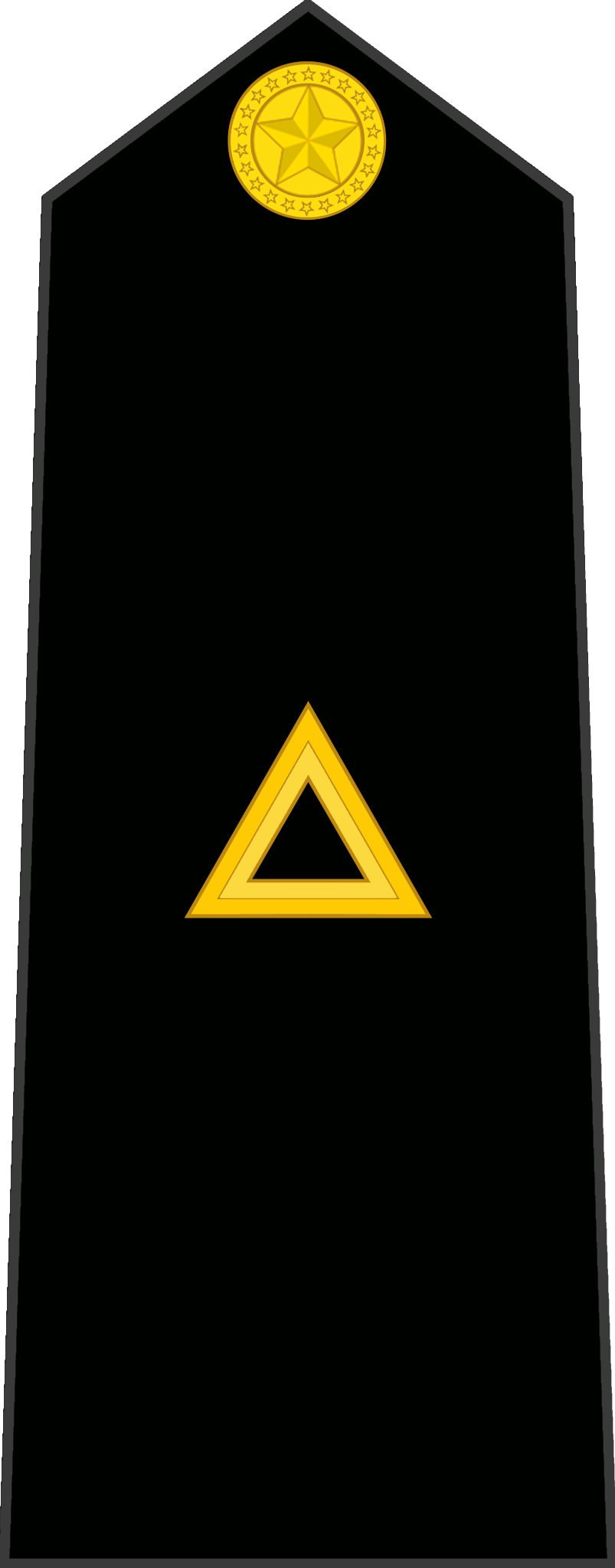
Rank group	Senior NCOs				Junior NCOs	Enlisted
Brazilian Military Police
Brazilian Military Police	Subtenente	Primeiro-sargento	Segundo-sargento	Terceiro-sargento	Cabo	Soldado primeira classe	Soldado segunda classe

All rank insignia are worn on the epaulettes of the shirt, except for sergeants, corporal and soldiers, which are worn on each sleeve, below the institutional patch (left) and state flag (right).

== Song of the Military Police of the Acre State ==
Portuguese lyrics	English translation
First stanza
Guardiã da estrela altaneira Mantendo a ordem e a segurança Nesta terra de grande esperança Onde a natureza canta És orgulho de uma sociedade Tradição de um povo valente Sempre em frente defendendo O direito dessa gente Nosso Acre, nossa grandeza Policia militar, Policia militar raça e ação Brasil, Brasil, Brasil Imortais teus heróis permanecem Dentro de cada coração O ideal que o passado floresce De geração em geração As estrelas do céu iluminam Os teus passos por este torrão És por Deus abençoada Filha da grande nação	Guardian of the towering star Keeping order and security In this land of great hope Where nature sings You are proud of a society Tradition of a brave people Always forward defending The right of these people Our Acre, our greatness Military police Military police race and action Brazil, Brazil, Brazil Immortals your heroes remain Inside every heart The ideal that the past flourishes From generation to generation The stars of the sky illuminate Your steps through this divot You are blessed by God; Daughter of the great nation

== Notable officers ==
- Cel. Kinpara first military police officer to act on a peace mission by United Nations (UN) organizations.

== See also ==
- Acre State
- Military Police of Brazil
- Military Firefighters Corps (Brazil)
- Brazilian Federal Police
- Federal Highway Police
- Brazilian Civil Police
- Brazilian Armed Forces
- Military Police
- Gendarmerie
