= Firefighters Corps of Acre State =

Auxiliary police of the Brazilian state of Acre

Military Firefighter Corps of Acre State
- Corpo de Bombeiros Militar do Estado do Acre (CBMAC)
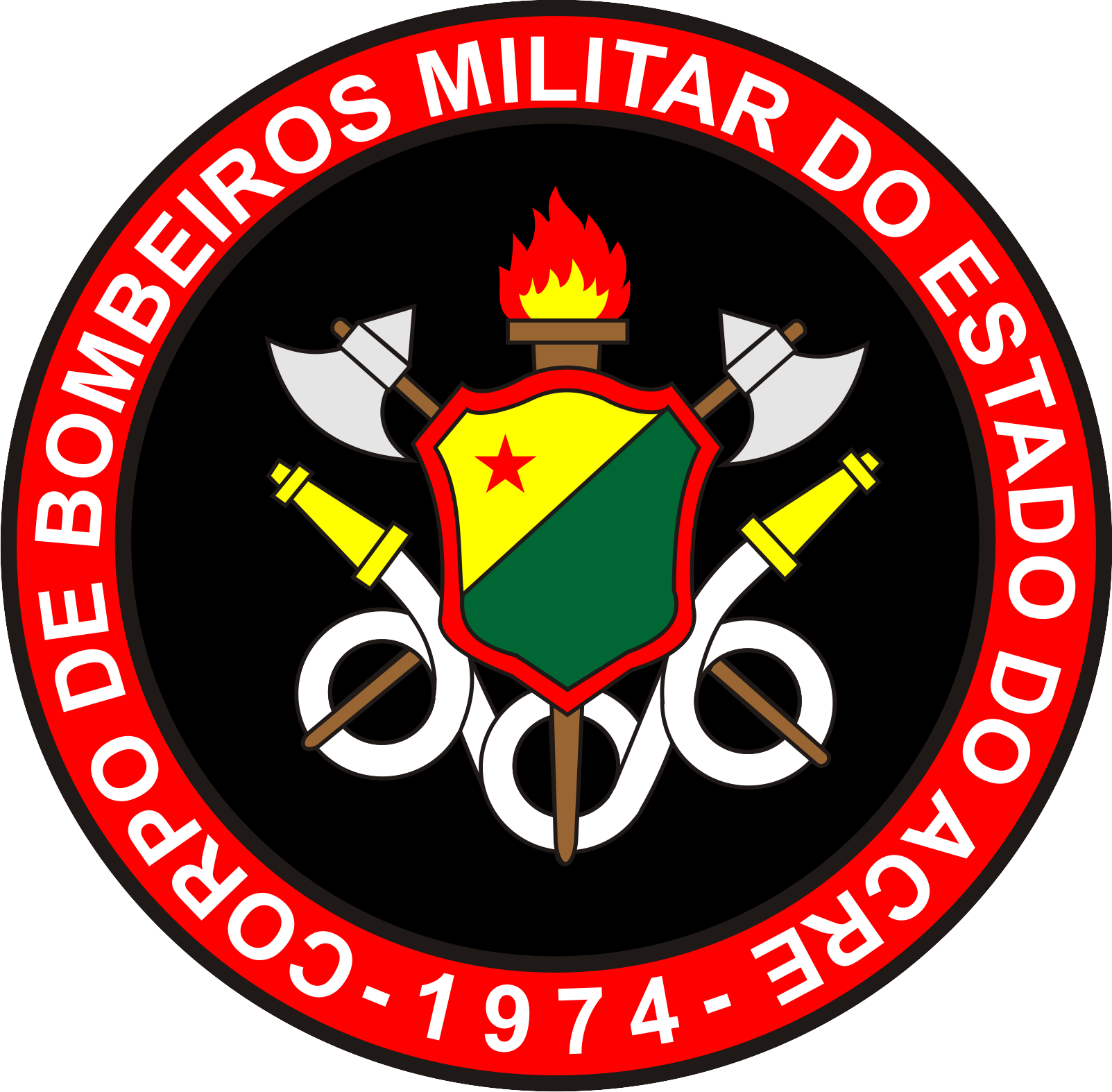

Operational area
- Country: Brazil
- State: Acre
- Address: Estrada da Usina, nº 669 Bairro Morada do Sol Rio Branco - AC

Agency overview
- Established: 1974

Website
- https://www.cbmac.ac.gov.br/

The Military Firefighters Corps of Acre State (Portuguese: Corpo de Bombeiros Militar do Estado do Acre) is the Military Firefighters Corps in Acre, Brazil. The Firefighters Corps (Portuguese: Corpo de Bombeiros) is part of the structure of the government. It was effectively created in 1974 alongside the Military Police.

The mission of the Firefighters Corps is the implementation of activities of Civil Defense, prevention and firefighting, search and rescue, and public assistance under the State of Acre. The unit is reserve troop and auxiliary force of the Brazilian Army, and integrating the system public security and social protection in Brazil.

== History ==
Since the establishment of the Provisional Government of the Independent State of Acre, in 1899, a Fire Brigade was attached to the Department of Justice. Subsequently, with the transformation of the region into Federal Territory, this service started to be done on a precarious basis by the companies Regional Police. The current Fire Department was only effectively organized in 1974, attached to the creation of the Military Police of Acre State. On 18 December 1990 the Corporation separated from the Military Police, starting to enjoy autonomy administrative and financial, and reporting directly to the State Government.

== Organization ==
The Military Firefighters of Acre State is formed by battalions, companies, and platoons. The battalions (Portuguese: Batalhão de Bombeiro Militar – BBM) and independent companies (Portuguese: Companhia Independente de Bombeiro Militar – CIBM) are organized into Regional Commands (Portuguese: Comandos Regionais de Bombeiro Militar – CRBM). These Commands are in major urban centers, and their battalions and companies are distributed according to population density in cities.

== Mission ==
The mission of the Firefighters Corps is the implementation of activities of civil defense, prevention and firefighting, search and rescue, and public assistance under the State of Acre. The unit is reserve troop and ancillary force of the Brazilian Army, and integrating the system public security and social protection in Brazil.

- Fire prevention and extinction urban and forest is;
- Conducting search and rescue services for people, animals, goods and possessions;
- Pre-hospital emergency care;
- Conducting surveys in Buildings;
- Conducting fire assessments;
- Relief assistance in cases of Floods, landslides or catastrophes; where there is people in imminent danger of life, or threat of destruction of assets;
- Study, analysis, planning and inspection of fire safety, at the state level;
- Embargo or interdiction of public works, services, houses or places of entertainment, which do not offer conditions of security for the operation;
- Study, Prevention and fight against forest fires;
- In case of mobilization of the Brazilian Army, cooperation in Civil Defense services upon authorization from the State Government.

== Emergency telephone number ==
In all of Brazil, the emergency telephone number of the Military Firefighters Corps is one, nine, three (193). It is a toll-free call.

== Uniforms ==
The Firefighters Corps of Acre wear the same uniforms of the Military Firefighters of Acre State, just adding their badges and insignias.

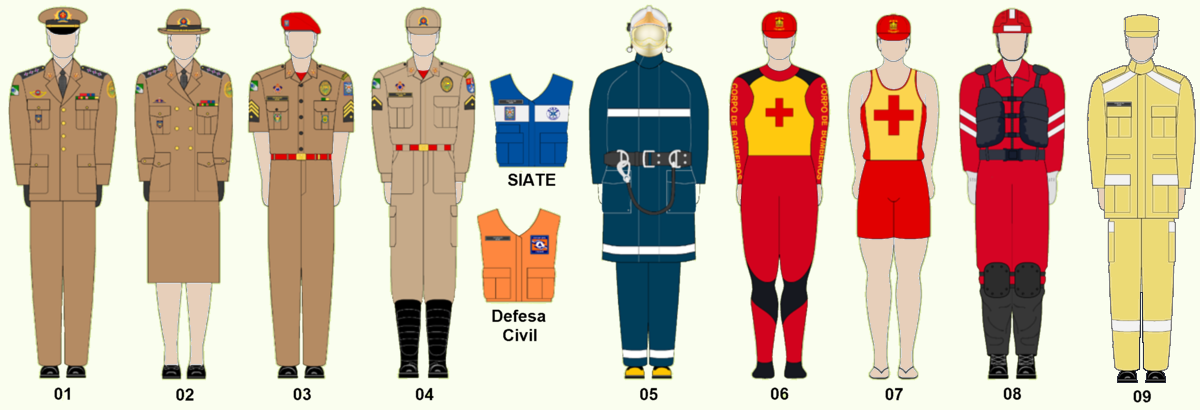

01 & 02 – dress uniform, 03 & 04 – battledress, 05 – PPE of firefighter, 06 & 07 – lifeguard and 08 – search and rescue vest.

== Rank insignia ==
Officers

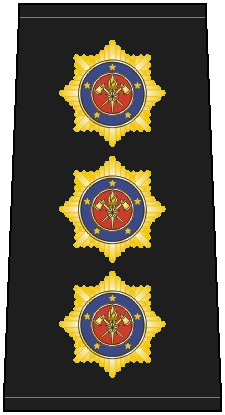
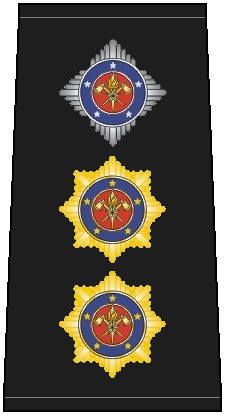
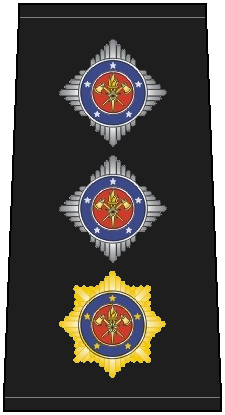
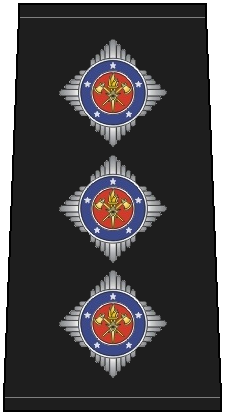
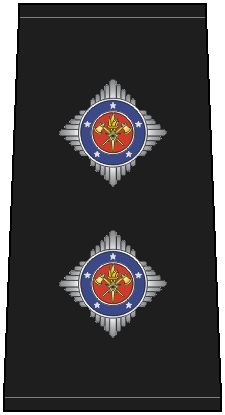
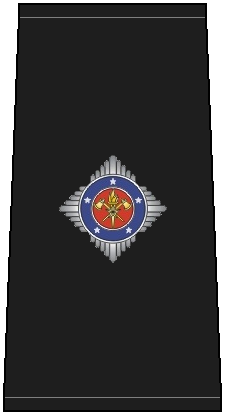
| Rank group | General / flag officers | Senior officers | | | Junior officers |
|---|---|---|---|---|---|---|---|
| (Brazil) Military Firefighters Corps |
| (Brazil) Military Firefighters Corps | | Coronel | Tenente-coronel | Major | Capitão | Primeiro tenente | Segundo tenente |

NCO and enlisted grades

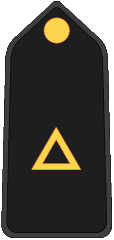
| Rank group | Senior NCOs | | | | Junior NCOs | Enlisted |
|---|---|---|---|---|---|---|---|
| (Brazil) Military Firefighters Corps |
| (Brazil) Military Firefighters Corps | Subtenente | Primeiro-sargento | Segundo-sargento | Terceiro-sargento | Cabo | Bombeiro primeira classe | Bombeiro segunda classe |

== See also ==
- List of fire departments
- Military Firefighters Corps
- Military police in Brazil
- Brazilian Armed Forces
- Military Police (Brazil)

== Sources ==
- Bombeiros do Paraná; Herbert Munhoz van Erven; Edição do author; Curitiba – 1954.
