= Military Firefighters Corps of the State of Rio de Janeiro =

- Corpo de Bombeiros Militar do Estado do Rio de Janeiro
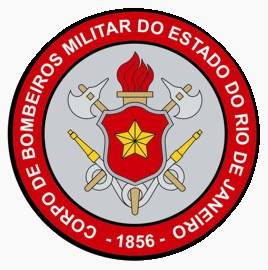
- Active: 1856; 169 years ago
- Country: Brazil
- Branch: Military Firefighters Corps
- Role: Fire fighting
- Size: 13,715
- Part of: Military Reserve Force of Brazilian Army
- Nickname(s): CBM
- Motto(s): Vida Alheia e Riquezas Salvar
- Anniversaries: July 2

Commanders
- Commander: Governor of Rio de Janeiro

The Military Firefighters Corps of the State of Rio de Janeiro (Portuguese: Corpo de Bombeiros Militar do Estado do Rio de Janeiro, CBMERJ) has the mission to conduct activities in civil defense, preventing and fighting fires, search and rescue and public aid in the state of Rio de Janeiro.

CBMRJ is an Auxiliary Force and Reserve of the Brazilian Army, and is part of the Public Security and Social Defense System of Brazil. Its members are called Military of the States by the Federal Constitution of 1988, as well as the members of the Military Police of the State of Rio de Janeiro.

== History ==
The Military Firefighters Corps of the State of Rio de Janeiro is the oldest in Brazil. It was founded by Emperor Pedro II of Brazil in 1856, after the incidence of numerous tragedies, such as the São João Theater fires, in 1851 and 1856. At that time the Emperor decided to organize the Court's Provisional Fire Brigade, gathering under the same administration the different sections that existed until then (in the Arsenals of War and Navy, Public Works Department and House of Correction).

In April 1860 the first regulation was published, which contained its subordination to the Ministry of Justice.

In 1864, the General Directorate was installed at Praça da Aclamação, which remains today as headquarters of the General Command of CBMERJ.

== See also ==
- Military Police of Rio de Janeiro State
- Military Firefighters Corps
- Military ranks of Brazil
