= Firefighters Corps of Paraná State =

Firefighters Corps of Paraná State Corpo de Bombeiros do Paraná
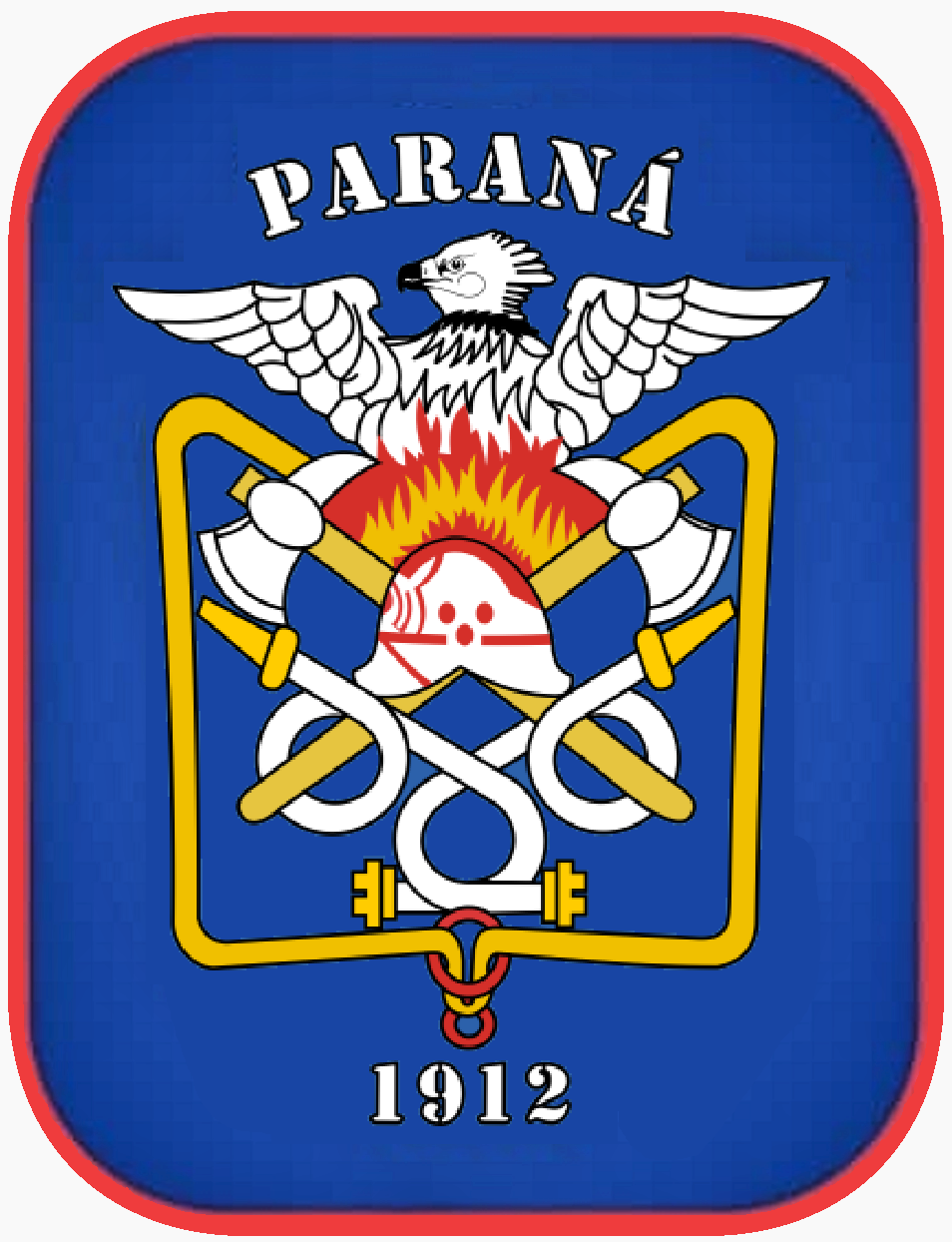
- Badge of CCB PMPR
- Active: March 23, 1912
- Country: Brazil; Paraná
- Type: Military Firefighters
- Garrison/HQ: Curitiba
- Nickname: CCB PMPR
- Patron: D. Pedro II
- Mottos: For a life all sacrifice is duty. Por uma vida todo sacrifício é dever.
- March: March Soldado do Fogo (Soldiers of the Fire)
- Anniversaries: October 8, 1912
- Engagements: Contestado War; Revolt of 1924; Revolution of 1930; Revolution of 1932

The Firefighter Corps of Paraná State (Portuguese: Corpo de Bombeiros do Estado do Paraná) is the Military Firefighters Corps in the State of Paraná, Brazil. The Firefighters Corps (Portuguese: Corpo de Bombeiros) is part of the structure of the Military Police of State.

The mission of the Firefighters Corps is the implementation of activities of Civil Defense, prevention and firefighting, search and rescue, and public assistance under the State of Paraná. The unit is reserve troop and ancillary force of the Brazilian Army, and integrating the system public security and social protection in Brazil.

== Antecedents ==
The creation of a Firefighters Corps was suggested by Emperor in his visit to Paraná in 1880. The Municipality of Curitiba received from the D. Pedro II the amount of $500,000 for the purchase of a fire pump. However, because the amount be reduced, was acquired a small pump, inappropriate for use.

In 1882 was established that the Police Corps should develop training in fire fighting, to attend the capital of the Province.

Later, in 1886, the Municipality tried again to buy another pump of the Company of Apprentices Sailors (Portuguese: Companhia de Aprendizes Marinheiros) of Paranaguá city, but after being made an inspection, it was concluded that the bomb was useless.

After the Proclamation of the Republic, in 1894, was authorized the creation of a Section of Firefighters in the Security Regiment; which was increased to one company in 1906. But were not acquired the necessary equipment, and despite the lack of resources, the only service of fire fighting in the city of Curitiba, was conducted by German–Brazilian Society of Firefighters Volunteers (1897–1901).

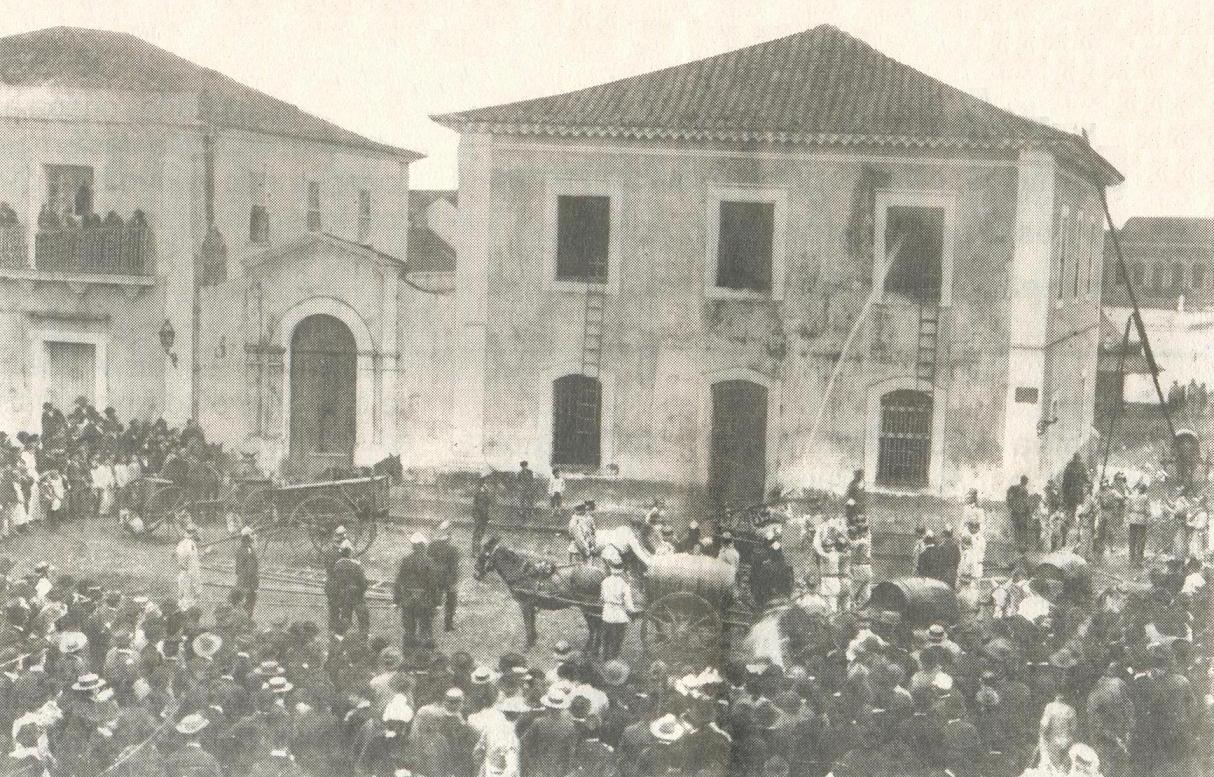
German-Brazilian Firefighters Volunteers Firefighting in Curitiba - 1897

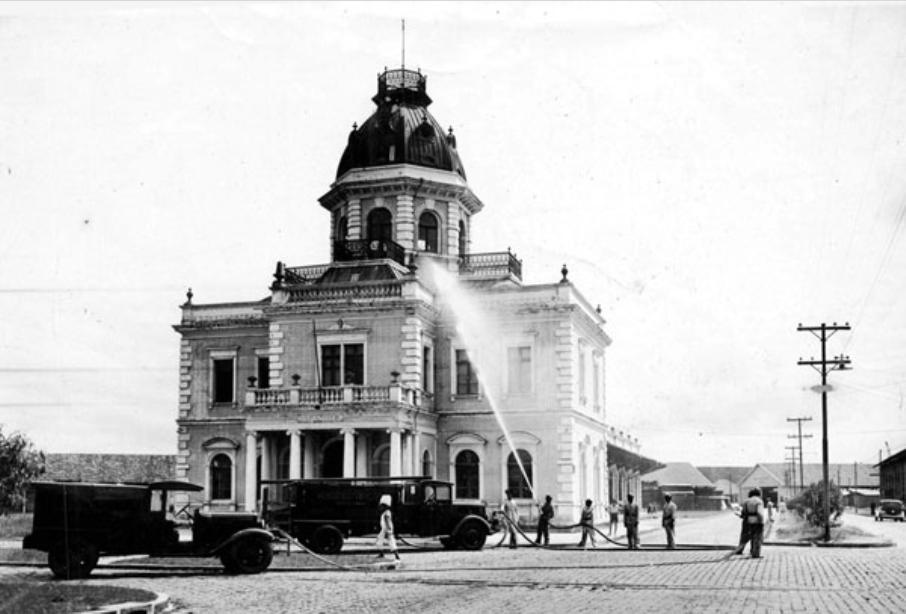
Training of firefighting - Paranaguá

The Firefighters Corps of Paraná was established in 1912. The unit was conceived militarized as the Sapeurs-pompiers of France, and followed by model the Firefighters Corps of the Federal District, with its structure, organization and uniforms. In 1917 it was annexed to the Military Police to serve as reserve troop, and in this period the unit had active involvement in the conflicts that occurred.

- Contestado War
- Paulista Revolt of 1924
- Revolution of 1930
- Revolution of 1932

After a tumultuous period of revolutions, the Federal Government decided to demilitarize the firefighters to reduce the power of state forces. The situation is reversed only with the end of the Estado Novo, after the Second World War.

=== Reorganization ===
With the promulgation of a new Constitution in 1946, the federal legislation passed to allow the firefighters once again returned to Military Police. In Paraná it was to be incorporated in 1948, with full autonomy technical, administrative and financial.

At that time the Firefighters Corps was organized by Sections.

- Section of Command;
- Section of Services;
- Section of Band of Music;
- And nine Sections of Firefighters, divided into detachments, called of Garrison of Fire.

=== 1967 ===
In the sixties years has adopted the name Groupement (Portuguese: Grupamento), corresponding roughly to a company.

1st Groupement of Fire
1st Group of Fire - Curitiba;
2nd Group of Fire - Curitiba;
3rd Group of Fire - Curitiba.

2nd Groupement of Lifeguard
1st Group of Lifeguard - Curitiba;
2nd Group of Lifeguard - Paranaguá;
3rd Group of Lifeguard - Guaratuba.

3rd Groupement of Fire
1st Group of Fire - Londrina;
2nd Group of Fire - Maringá.

4th Groupement of Fire
1st Group of Fire - Cascavel;
2nd Group of Fire - Guarapuava.

5th Groupement of Fire
1st Group of Fire - Paranaguá;
2nd Group of Fire - Antonina.

6th Groupement of Fire
1st Group of Fire - Ponta Grossa;
2nd Group of Fire - Ponta Grossa;
3rd Group of Fire - Irati.

7th Groupement of Auxiliary Services
Mission of Search and Rescue, mountain rescue, landslide, traffic collision, electrocution, etc.

8th Groupement of Fire
1st Group of Fire - Afonso Pena International Airport;
2nd Group of Fire - Curitiba (Parolin).

=== 1976 ===
The Groupement has become designated as Groupement of Fire (Portuguese: Grupamento de Fogo), corresponding roughly to a battalion; divided into Subgroupement of Fire (Portuguese: Subgrupamento de Incêndio), with an effective of company; subdivided in Section of Fire Fighting (Portuguese: Seção de Combate a Incêndio), with an effective of platoon.
The Groupement of Life Guards was transformed into Groupement of Search and Rescue (Portuguese: Grupamento de Busca e Salvamento).

- 1st Groupement of Fire - Curitiba;
- 2nd Groupement of Fire - Ponta Grossa;
- 3rd Groupement of Fire - Londrina;
- Groupement of Search and Rescue - Curitiba.

=== 1994 ===
In 1994 there was a remodeling of the structure, and the Groupement of Fire came to be called as a Groupement of Firefighters (Portuguese: Grupamento de Bombeiros). The Groupement of Search and Rescue is dissolved to form new units.

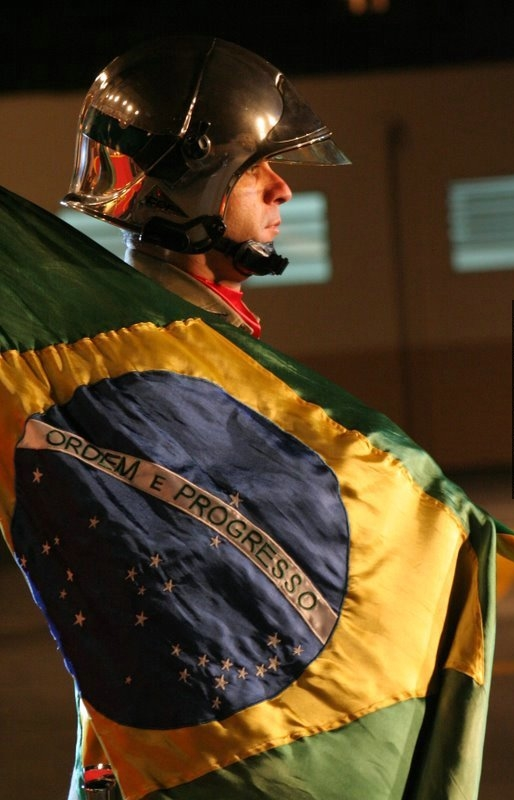
Standard-bearer CCB/PMPR.

- 1st Groupement of Firefighters - Curitiba;
- 2nd Groupement of Firefighters - Ponta Grossa;
- 3rd Groupement of Firefighters - Londrina;
- 4th Groupement of Firefighters - Cascavel;
- 5th Groupement of Firefighters - Maringá;
- 6th Groupement of Firefighters - São José dos Pinhais;
- 7th Groupement of Firefighters - Curitiba;
- 8th Groupement of Firefighters - Paranaguá;
- 9th Groupement of Firefighters - Foz do Iguaçu;
- 1st Independent Subgroupment of Firefighters - Ivaiporã;
- 2nd Independent Subgroupment of Firefighters - Pato Branco;
- 3rd Independent Subgroupment of Firefighters - Francisco Beltrão;
- 4th Independent Subgroupment of Firefighters - Apucarana;
- 5th Independent Subgroupment of Firefighters - Guarapuava;
- 6th Independent Subgroupment of Firefighters - Umuarama.

=== Fire apparatus ===
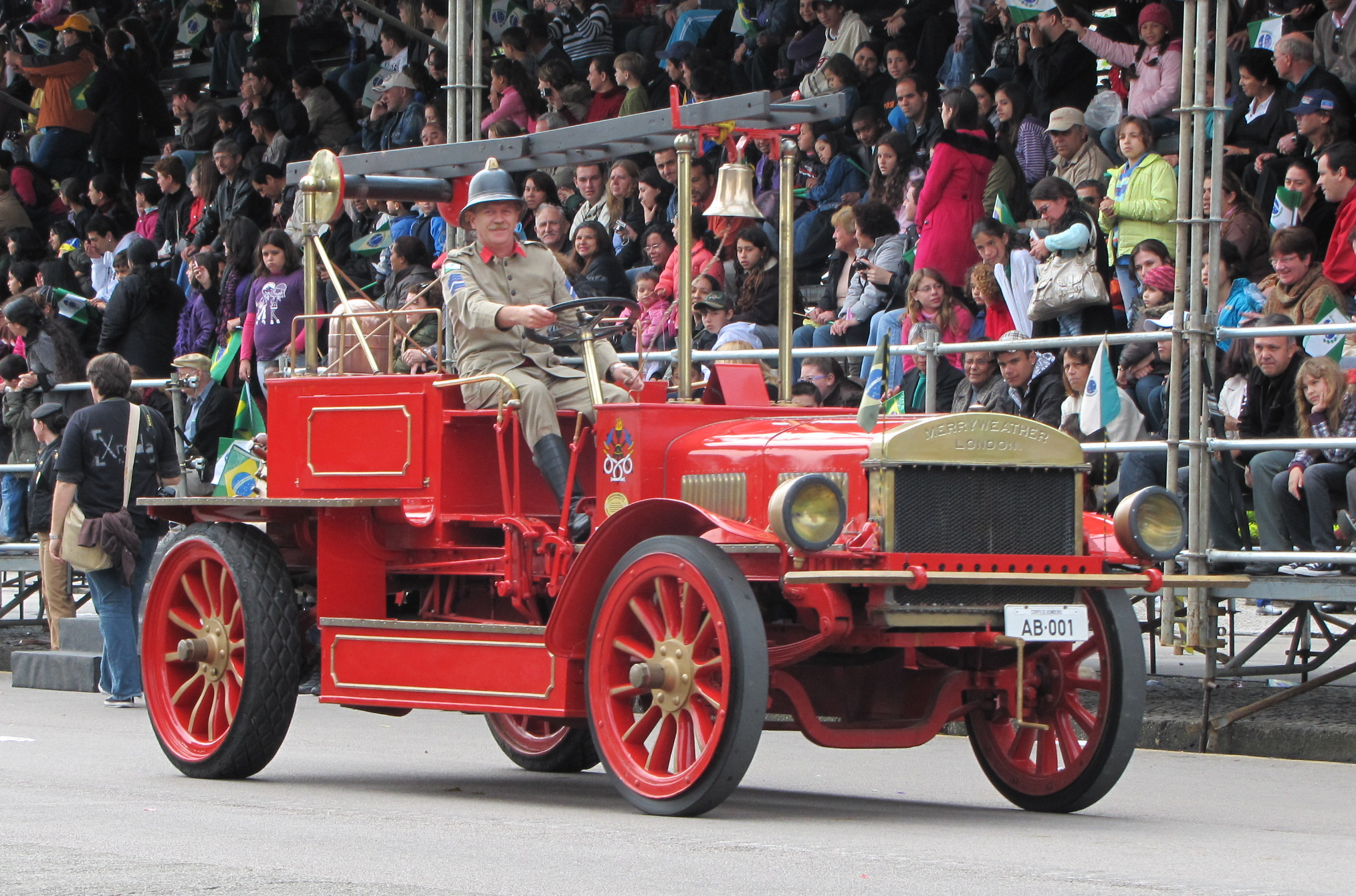

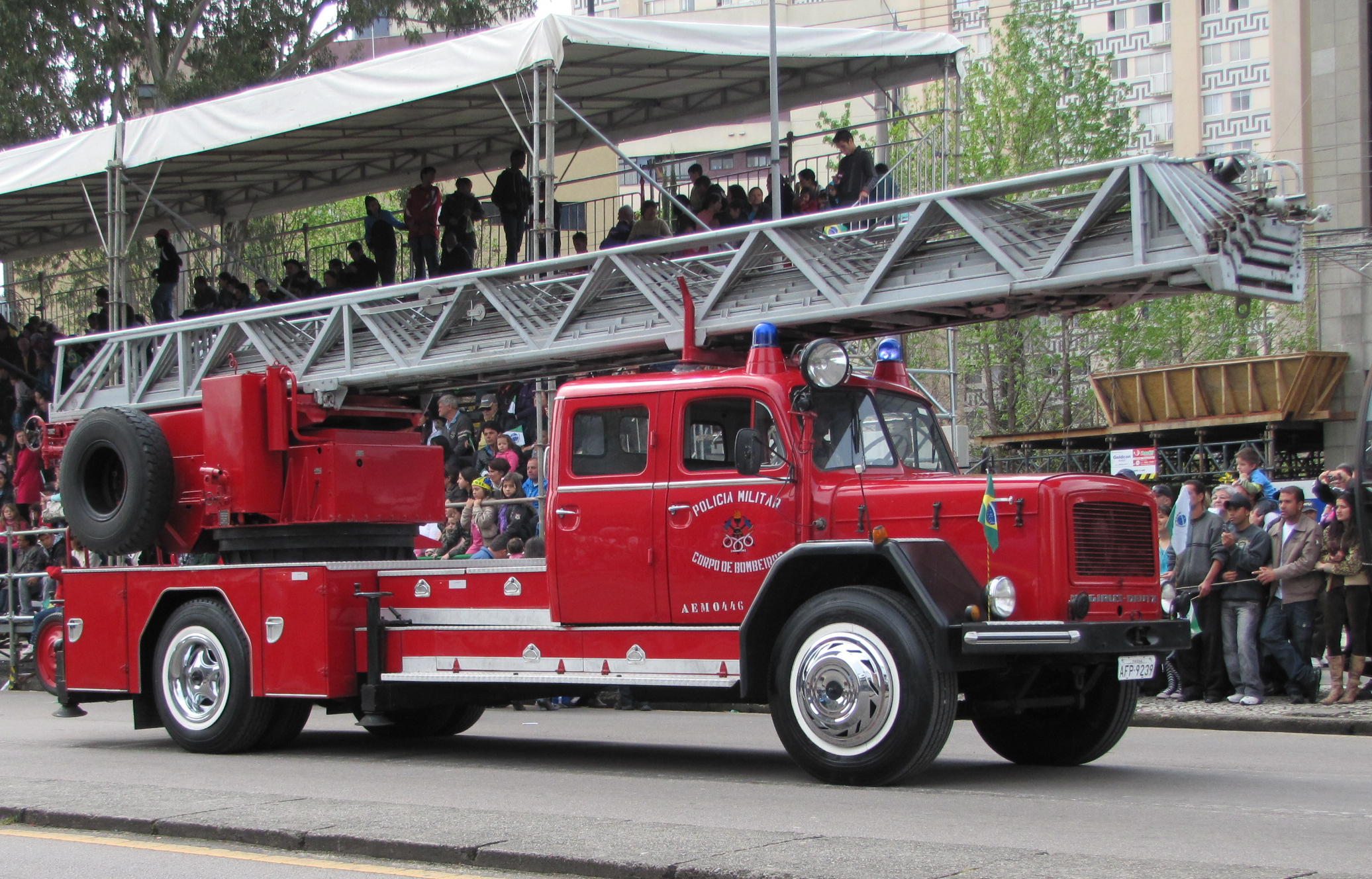

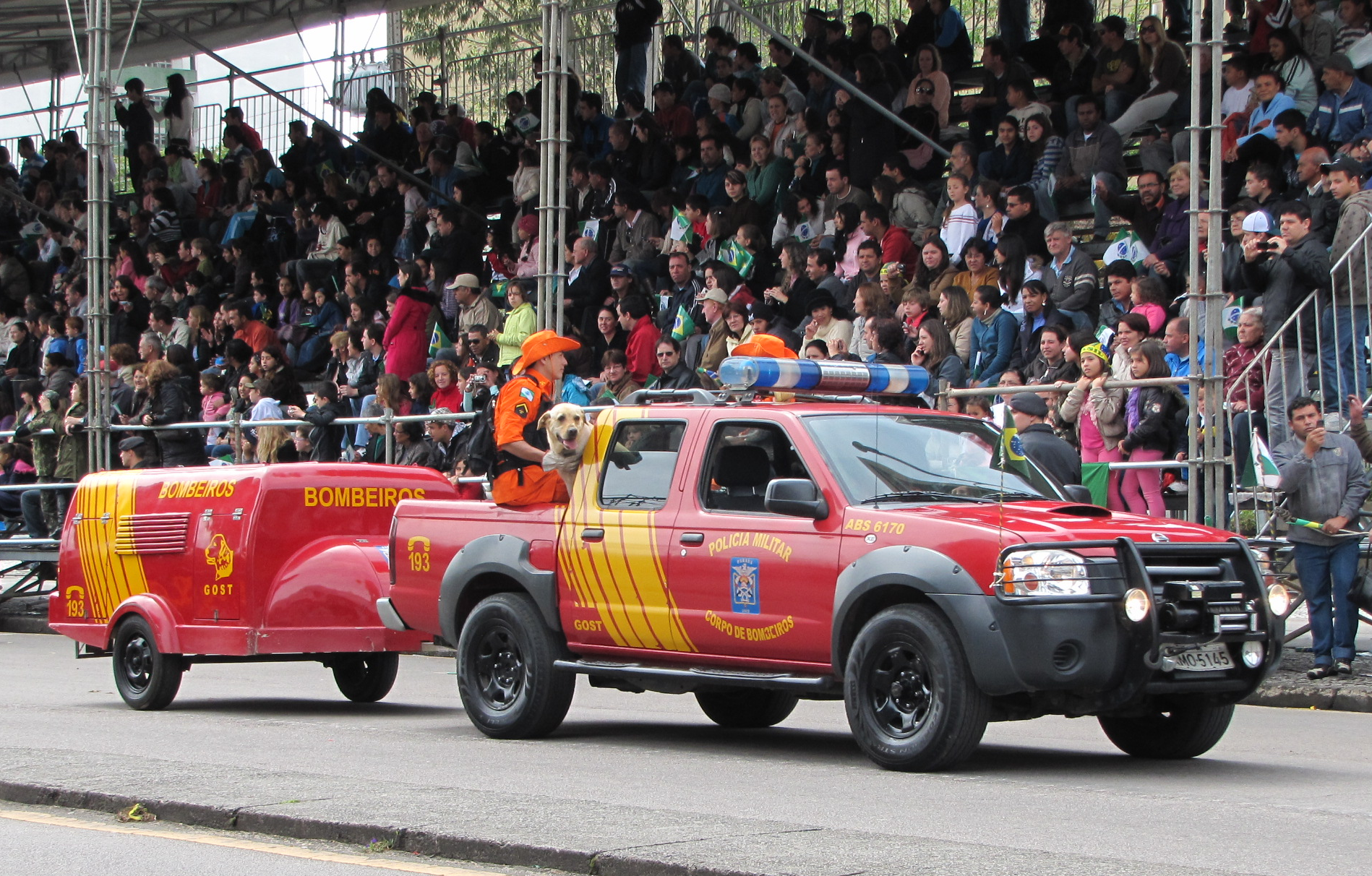

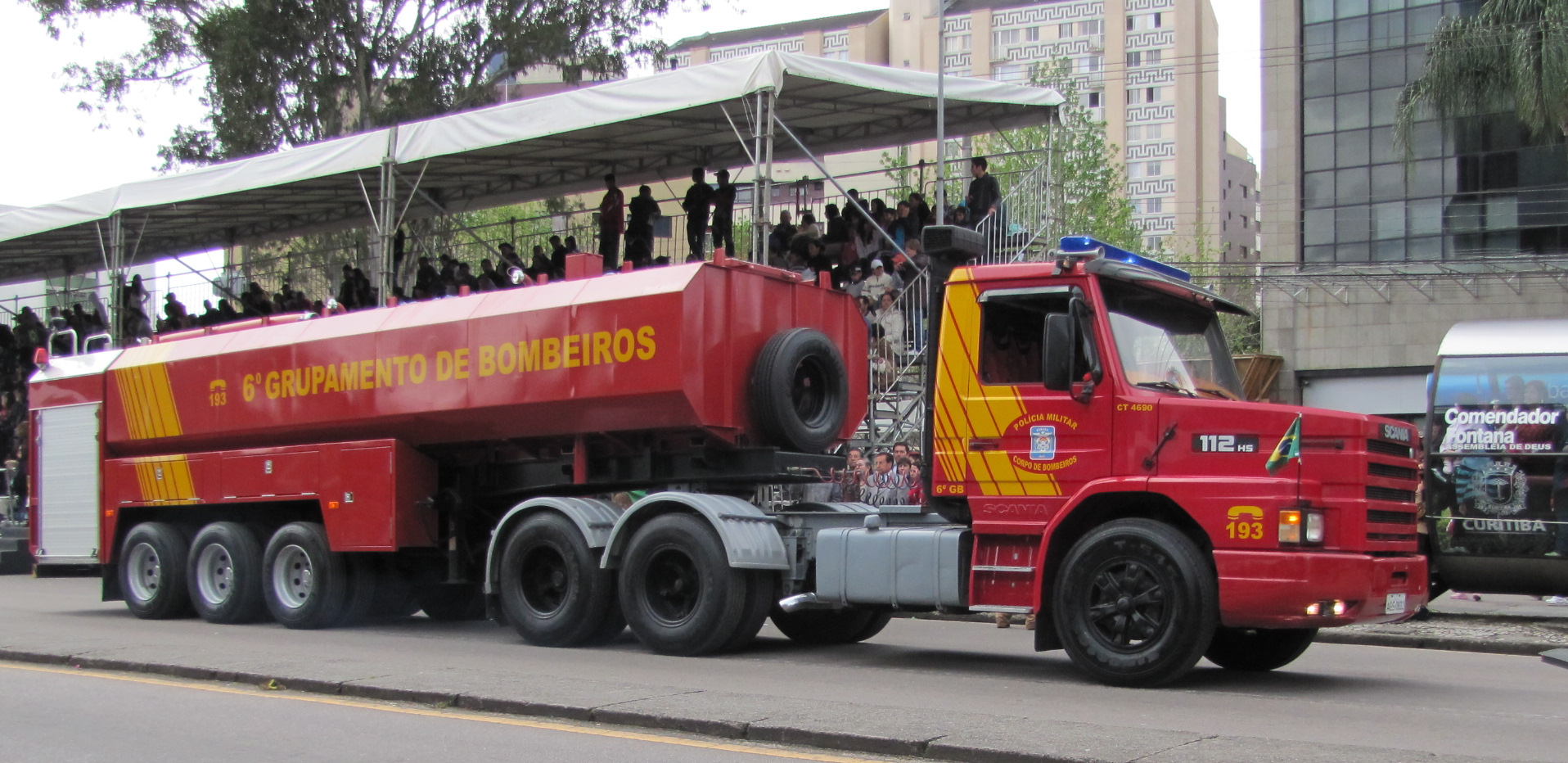

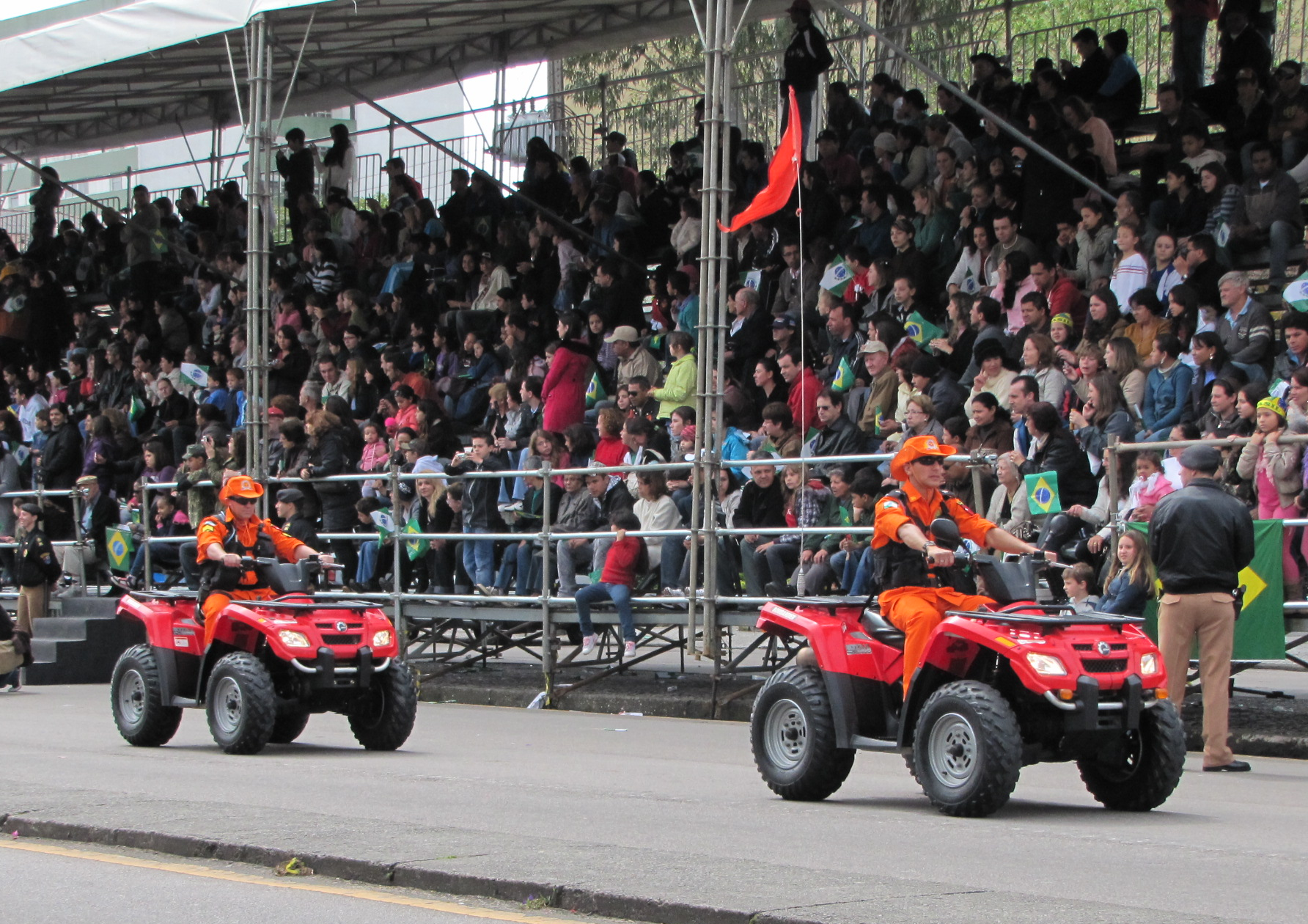

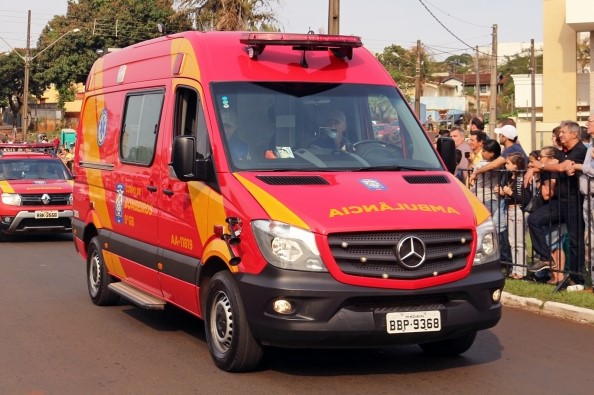

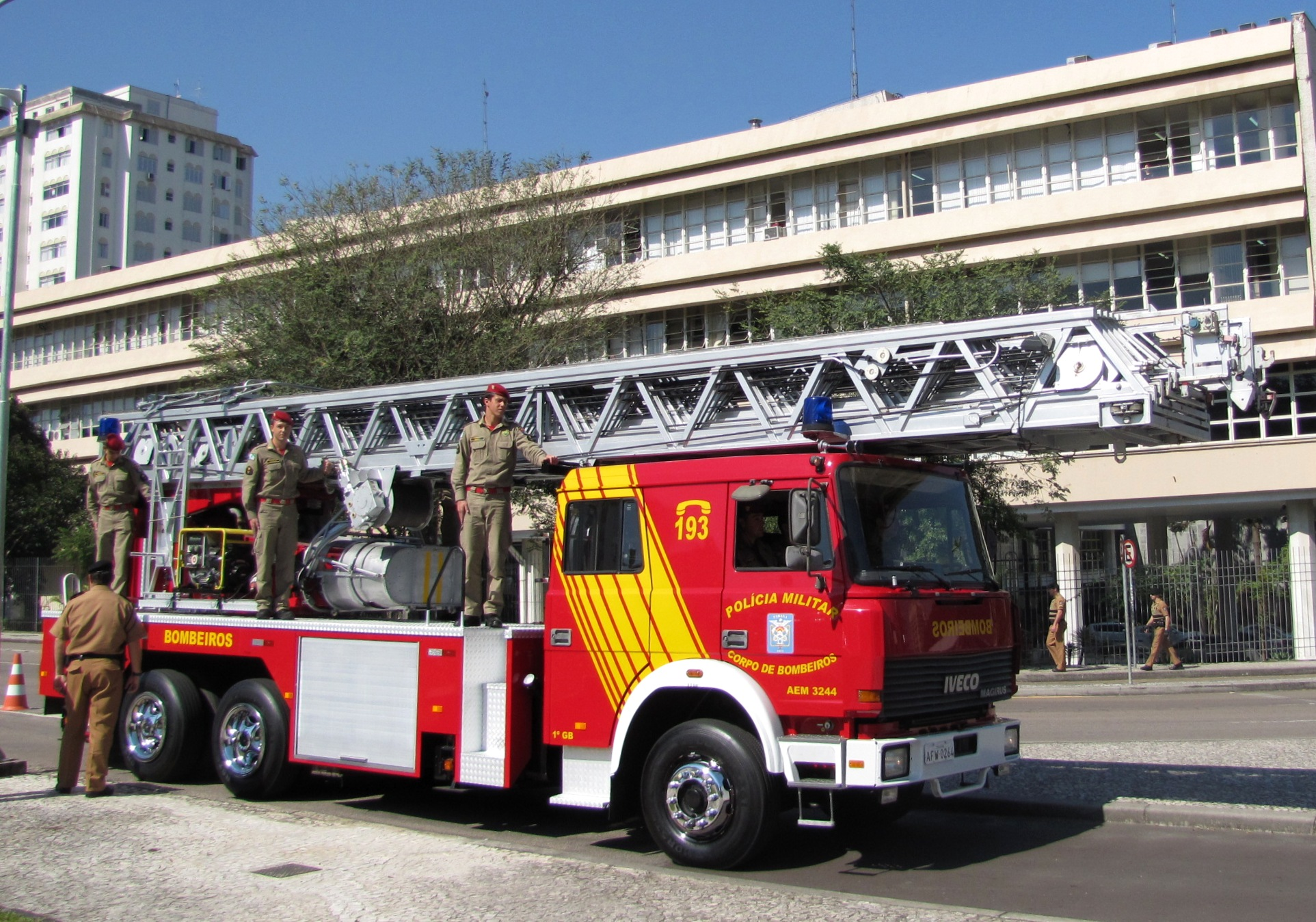

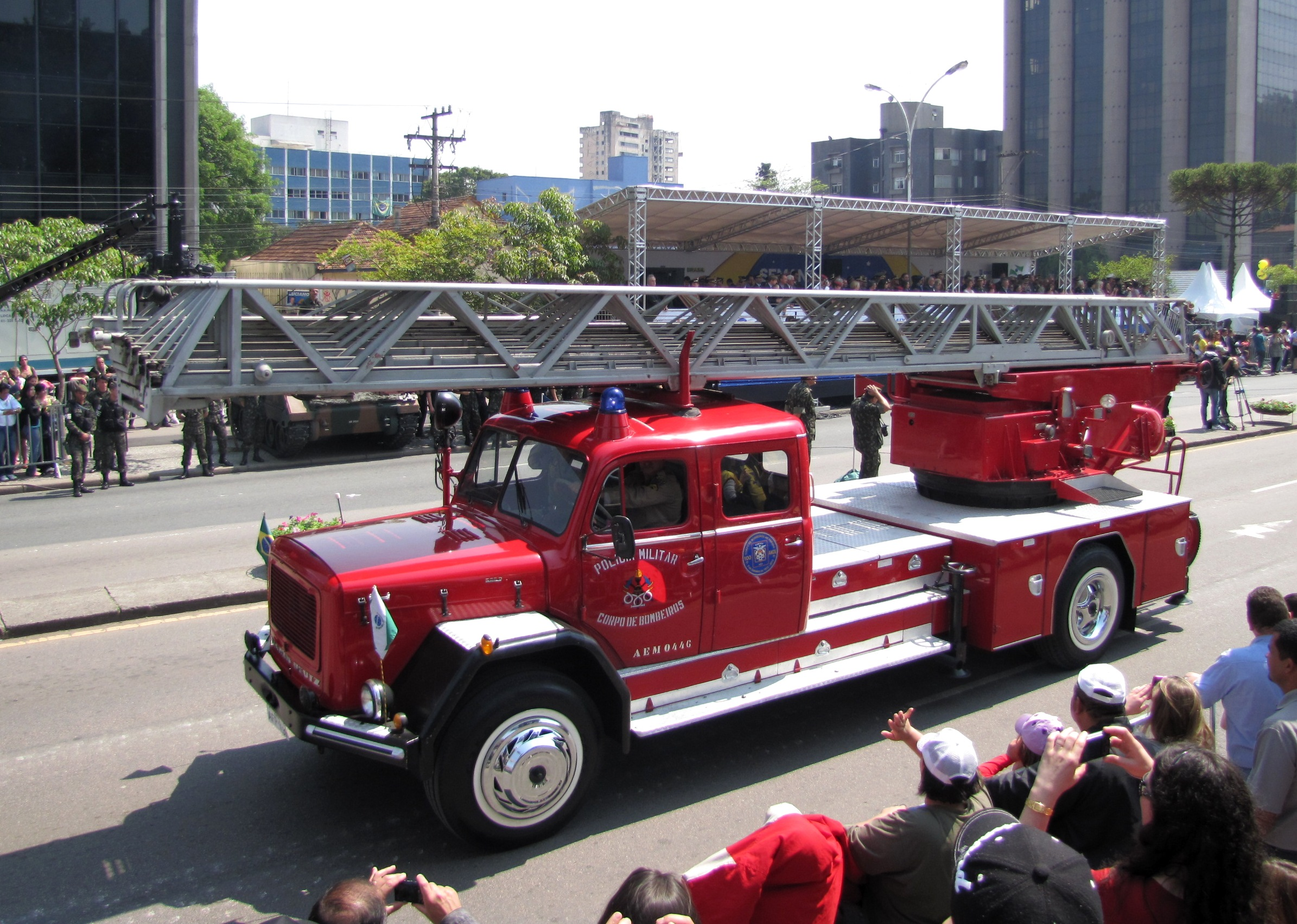

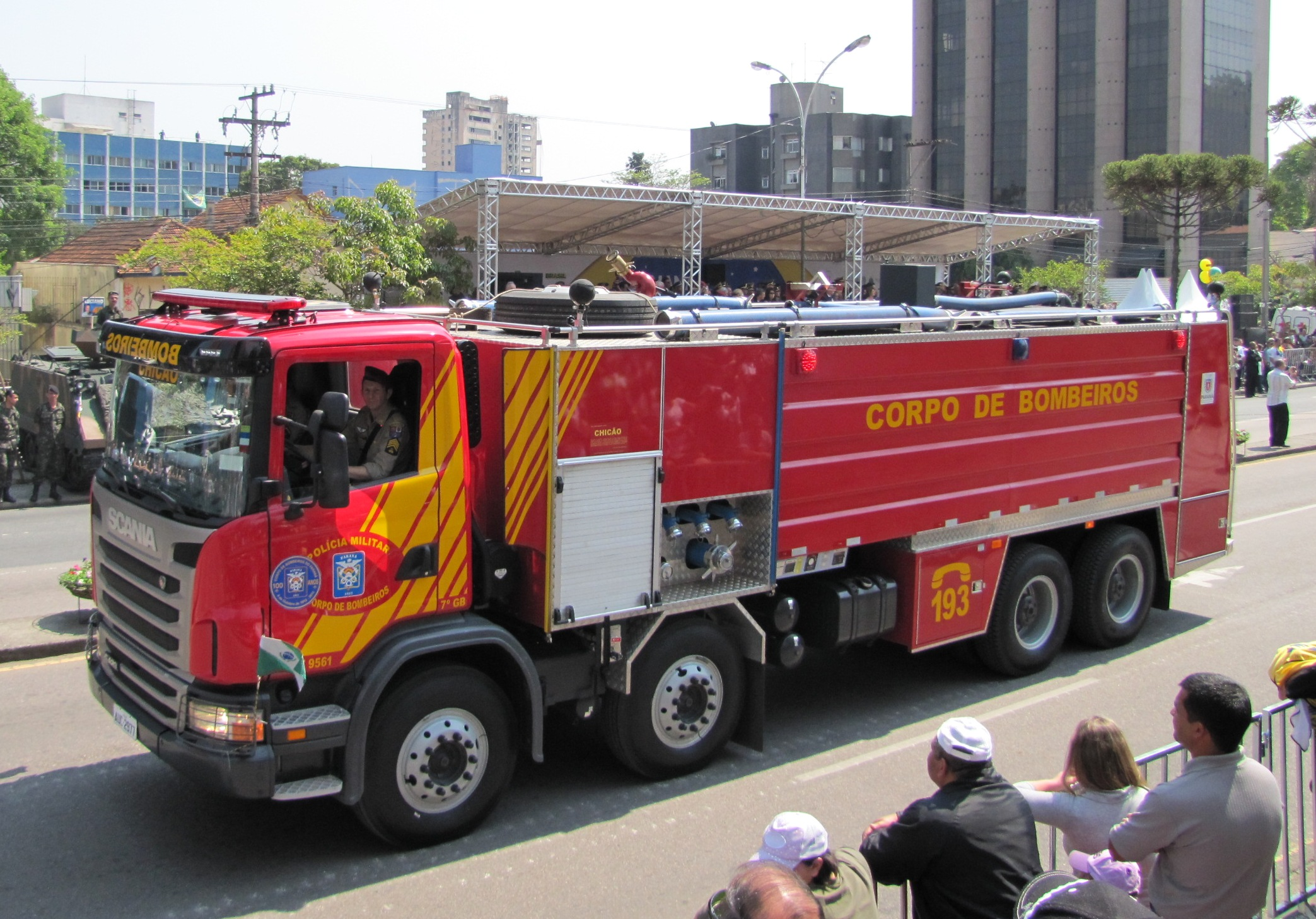

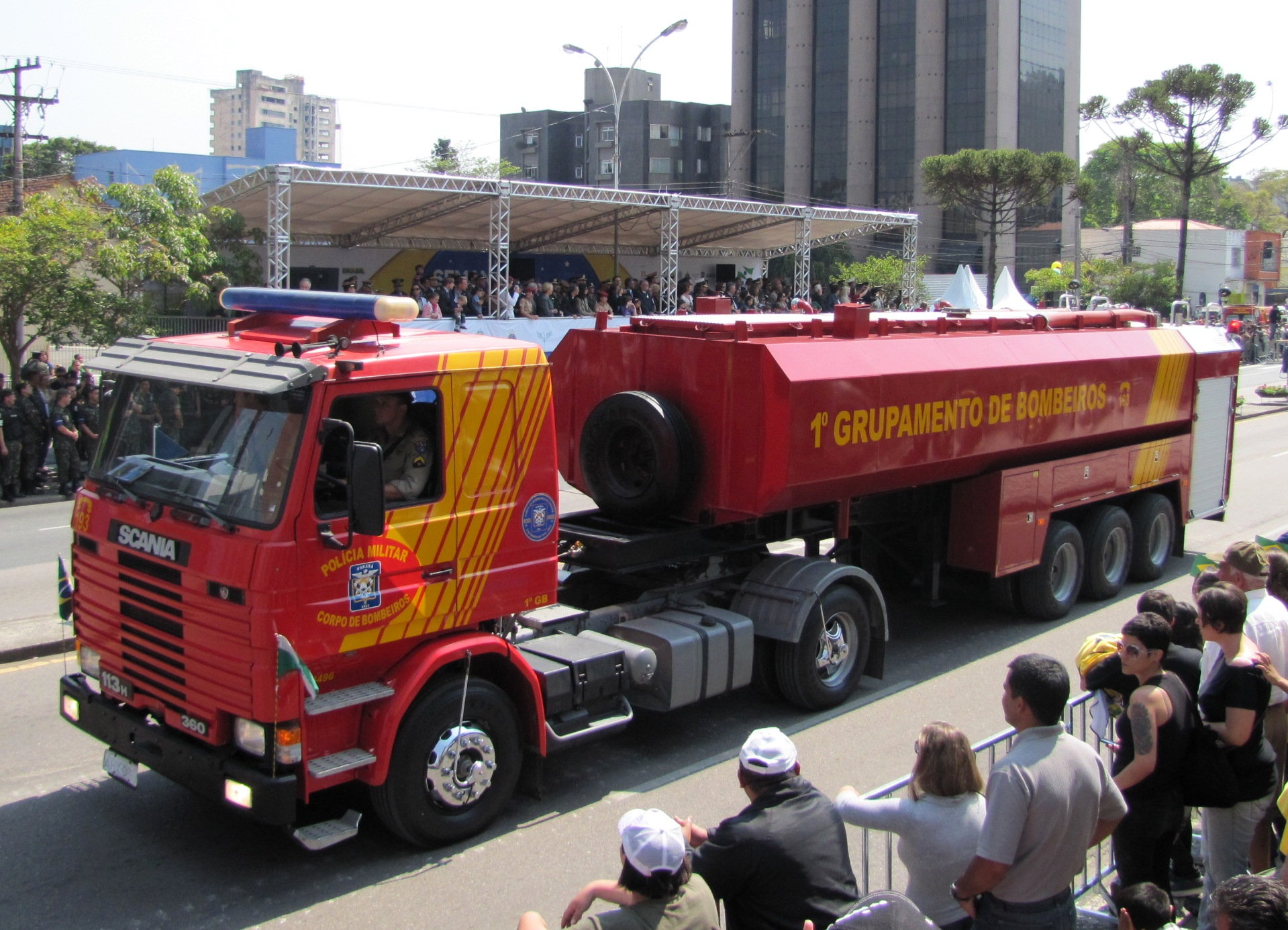

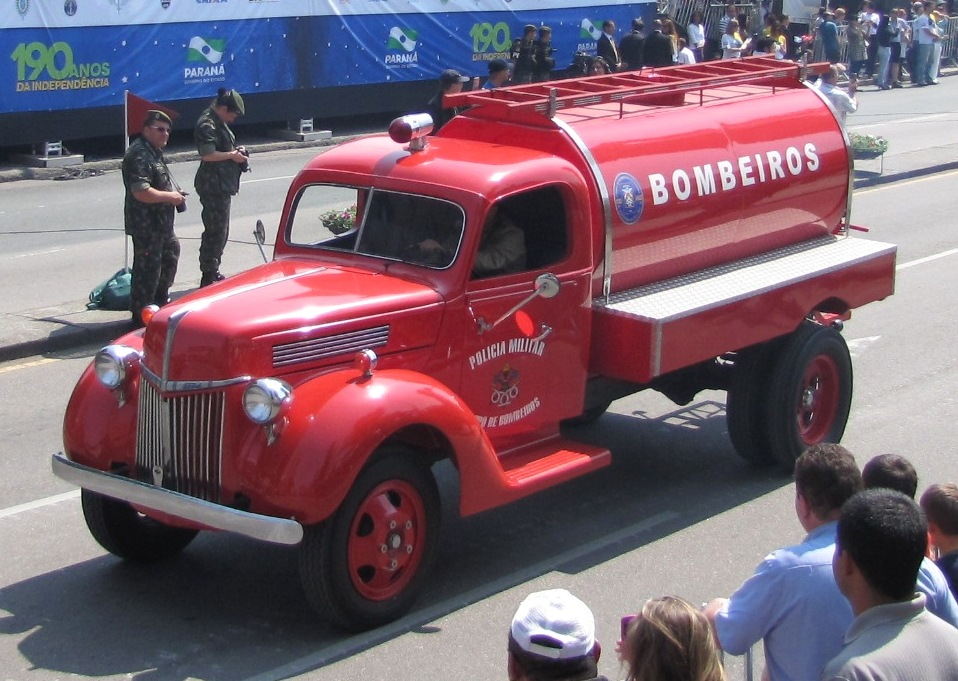

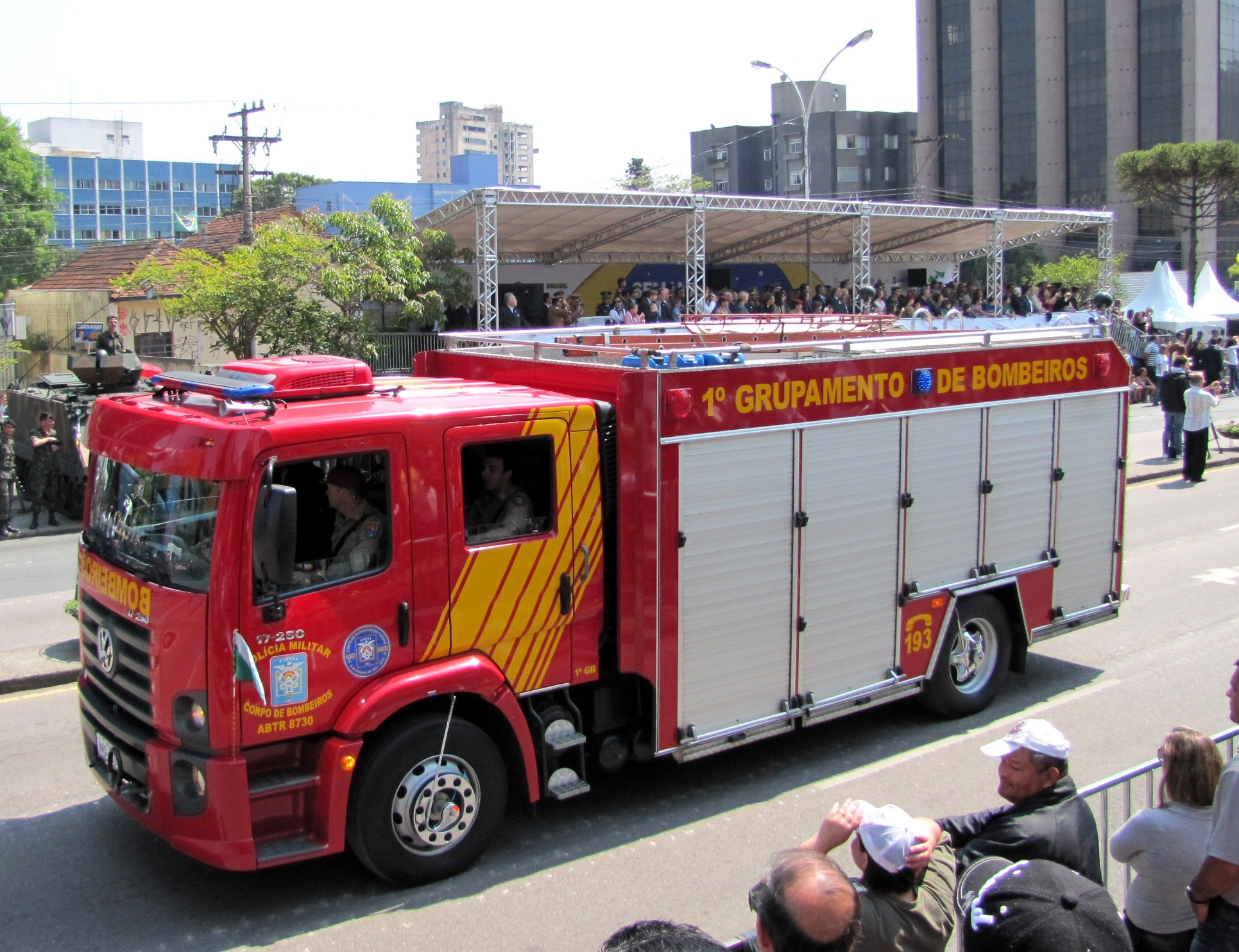

== Historic Designations ==
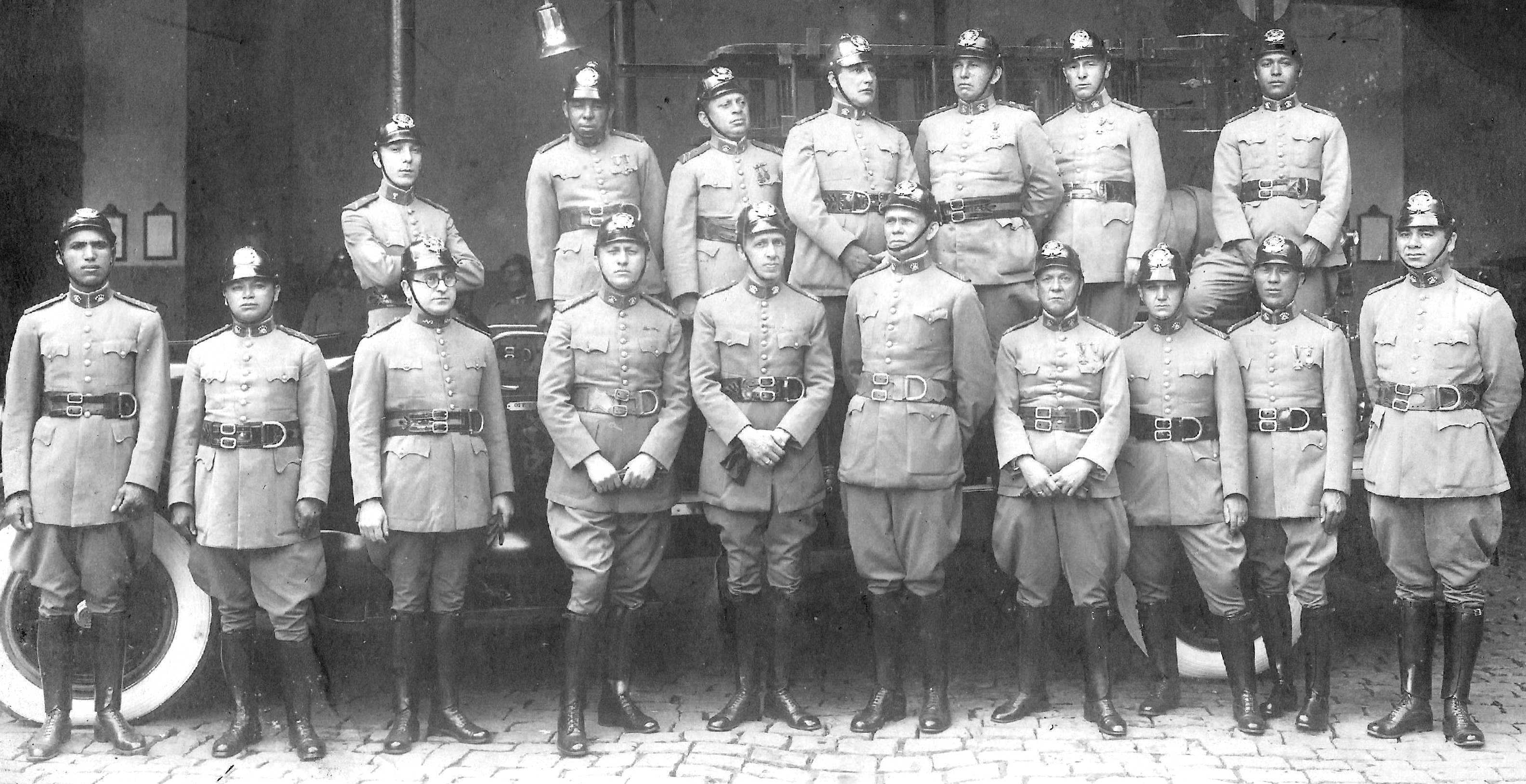
Firefighters Officers - 1923.

- 1912 - Firefighters Corps of Paraná State;
- 1917 - Firefighters Pontoniers Company of Paraná State;
- 1928 - Firefighters Corps of Paraná State;
- 1928 - Firefighters Company of Paraná State;
- 1931 - Sappers Pontoniers Battalion of Paraná State;
- 1932 - Firefighters Corps of Paraná State;
- 1934 - Firefighters Company of Paraná State;
- 1936 - Firefighters Corps of Municipality of Curitiba;
- 1938 - Firefighters Corps of Paraná State;
- 1948 - Firefighters Company of the Military Police of Paraná State;
- 1953 - Firefighters Corps of the Military Police of Paraná State.

== Uniforms ==
The Firefighters Corps of Paraná wear the same uniforms of the Military Police of Paraná, just adding their badges and insignias.

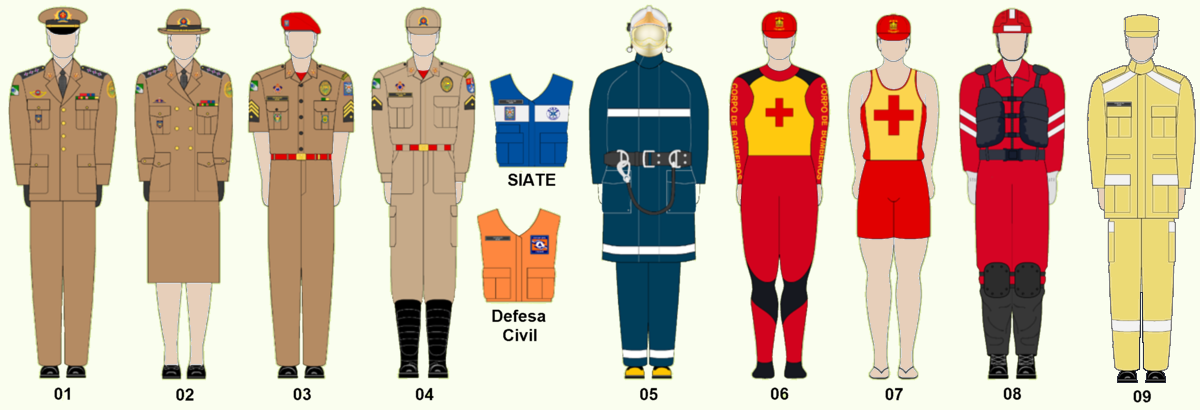

01 & 02 - dress uniform, 03 & 04 - battledress, 05 - PPE of firefighter, 06 & 07 - lifeguard and 08 - search and rescue vest.

=== Stable belt ===
In Brazil this belt is designated like gymnastic belt (Portuguese: cinto ginástico). It is one of the most traditional items of the uniforms of the Military Firefighters Corps; which is used with few modifications, since 1887. At first it was rather reinforced, made of cotton and leather, to serve as climbing harness. Today it is mild and only serves as a ceremonial item.

There are only two models of belts:

Officers

The belt has a horizontal strip in blue colour, with the buckles in silver metal. In the 1960s the leather parts were painted with white colour.

Soldiers (Sergeant, Corporal, and Private)

The belt is in red colour, with the buckles in gold metal.

== Ranks ==
The Firefighters Corps of Paraná has the same hierarchical classification of the Brazilian Army, with another type of insignias.

Officers

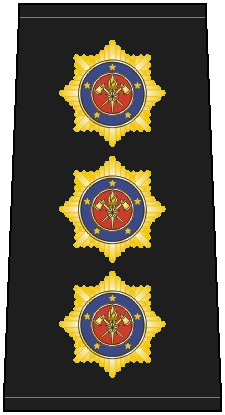
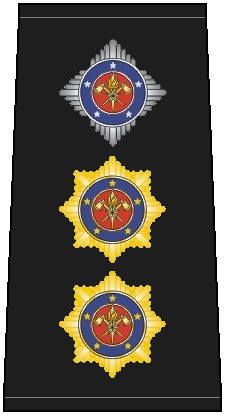
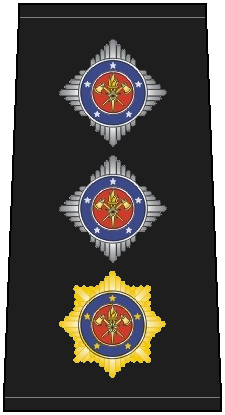
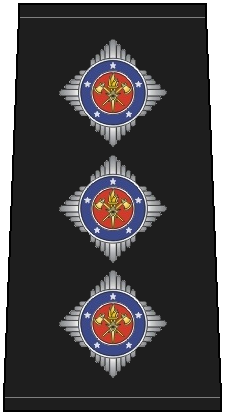
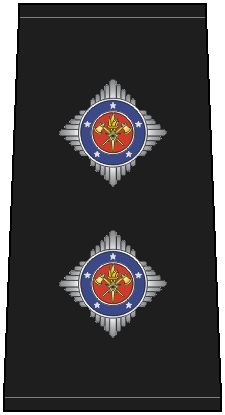
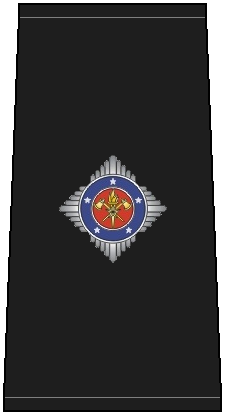
Rank group	General / flag officers	Senior officers			Junior officers
(Brazil) Military Firefighters Corps
(Brazil) Military Firefighters Corps		Coronel	Tenente-coronel	Major	Capitão	Primeiro tenente	Segundo tenente

NCO and enlisted grades

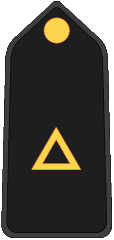
Rank group	Senior NCOs				Junior NCOs	Enlisted
(Brazil) Military Firefighters Corps
(Brazil) Military Firefighters Corps	Subtenente	Primeiro-sargento	Segundo-sargento	Terceiro-sargento	Cabo	Bombeiro primeira classe	Bombeiro segunda classe

== See also ==
- List of fire departments
- Paraná State
- Military Firefighters Corps
- Military police in Brazil

== Sources ==
- Bombeiros do Paraná; Herbert Munhoz van Erven; Edição do author; Curitiba - 1954.
