= Military Firefighters Corps =

- Corpo de Bombeiros Militar
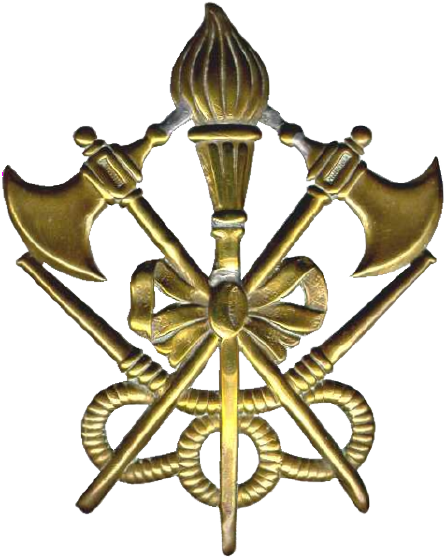
- Active: 1856; 170 years ago
- Country: Brazil
- Branch: Military firefighters corps
- Role: Fire fighting
- Size: 50,000 active personnel
- Part of: Military Reserve Force of Brazilian Army
- Nickname: CBM
- Patron: Emperor Pedro II
- Anniversaries: July 2

Commanders
- Commander: Governors of the States
- Ceremonial chief: General-Commander of each CBM

In Brazil, the Military Firefighters Corps (Portuguese: Corpo de Bombeiros Militar) are military public security forces, responsible for civil defense, firefighting and search and rescue inside the federative units. Since 1915, it has been a military reserve force and an auxiliary force of the Brazilian Army, also composing the Single System of Public Security (Brazilian Portuguese: Sistema Único de Segurança Pública). Members of the Military Firefighters Corps, such as the members of the Military Police, are designated as being part of the military of the Federative Units by the Federal Constitution.

Each Federative Unit has its own Military Firefighters Corps with different structures, rules and uniforms.

== History ==
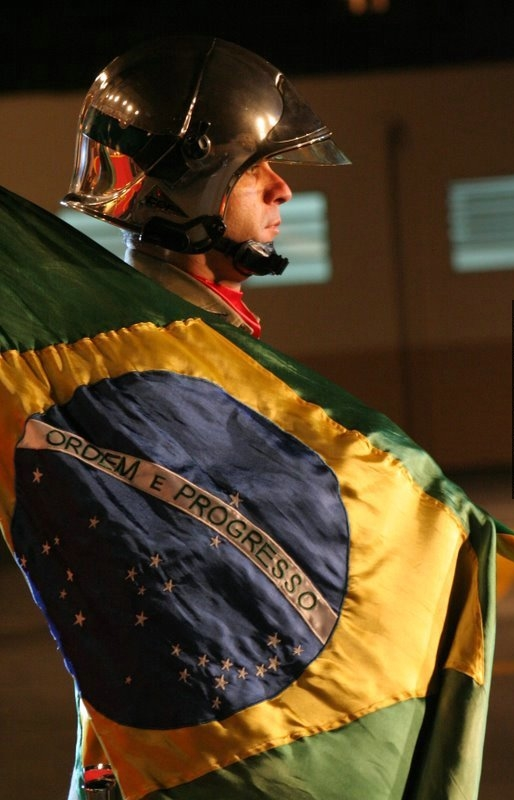
Standard-bearer.

The first organization of firefighters was created by Emperor Pedro II in 1856. Initially the Corps was not of a military character. It was only in 1880 that the Corps was militarized and it adopted a military hierarchy. Because of cultural and linguistic affinities to France, the Military Firefighter adopted an organisation similar to that of the Sapeurs-pompiers of Paris; who were classified as military engineers, and organized to serve as pioneers or sappers when necessary.

With the Proclamation of the Republic in 1889, the States that were financially better off were able to constitute their own Firefighters Corps. On the other hand, the Firefighters Corps of the Federal Capital (Rio de Janeiro, until 1960), was from the start completely autonomous, being created within the structure of the armed forces of the State, the former name of the current Brazilian military police.

In 1915 Federal legislation authorized the incorporation of the militarized forces of the states into the Brazilian Army, in the event of national mobilization. In 1917 the Brigade of Police and the Firefighters Corps of the Federal Capital were officially considered part of the military reserve; condition that to continuation extended to the States. In this period the Firefighters Corps, as members of the military forces of the States, fought in the main conflicts that resulted in present-day Brazil.

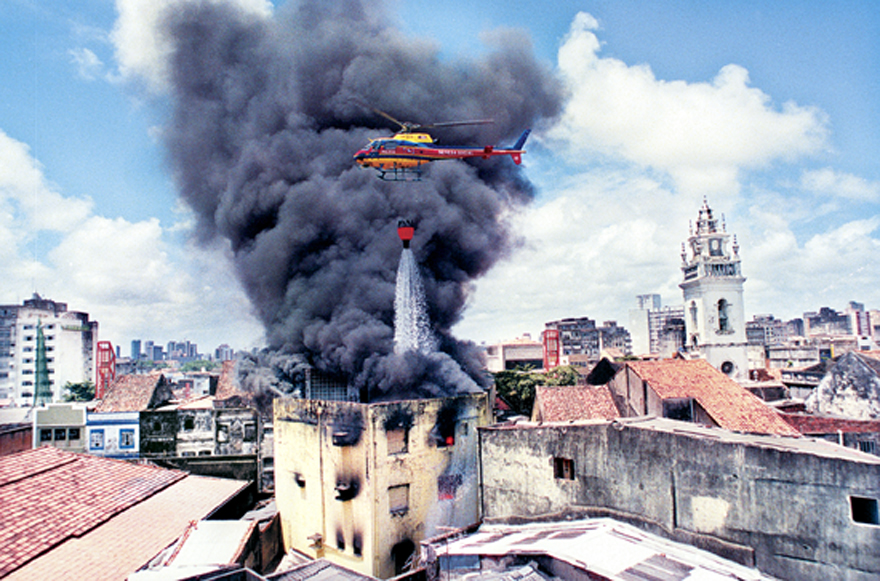
Military Firefighters of Pernambuco.

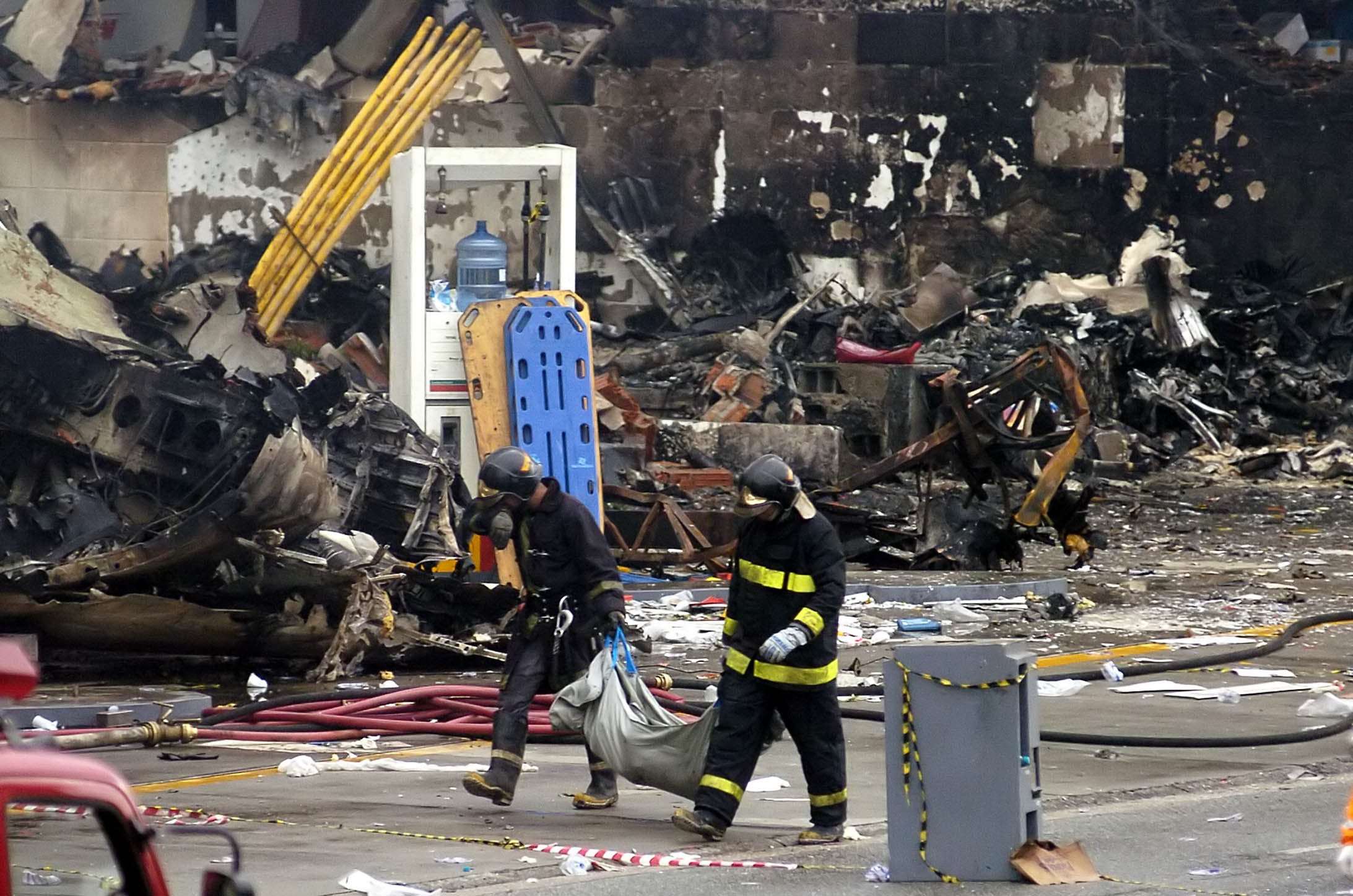
Military Firefighters of São Paulo State.

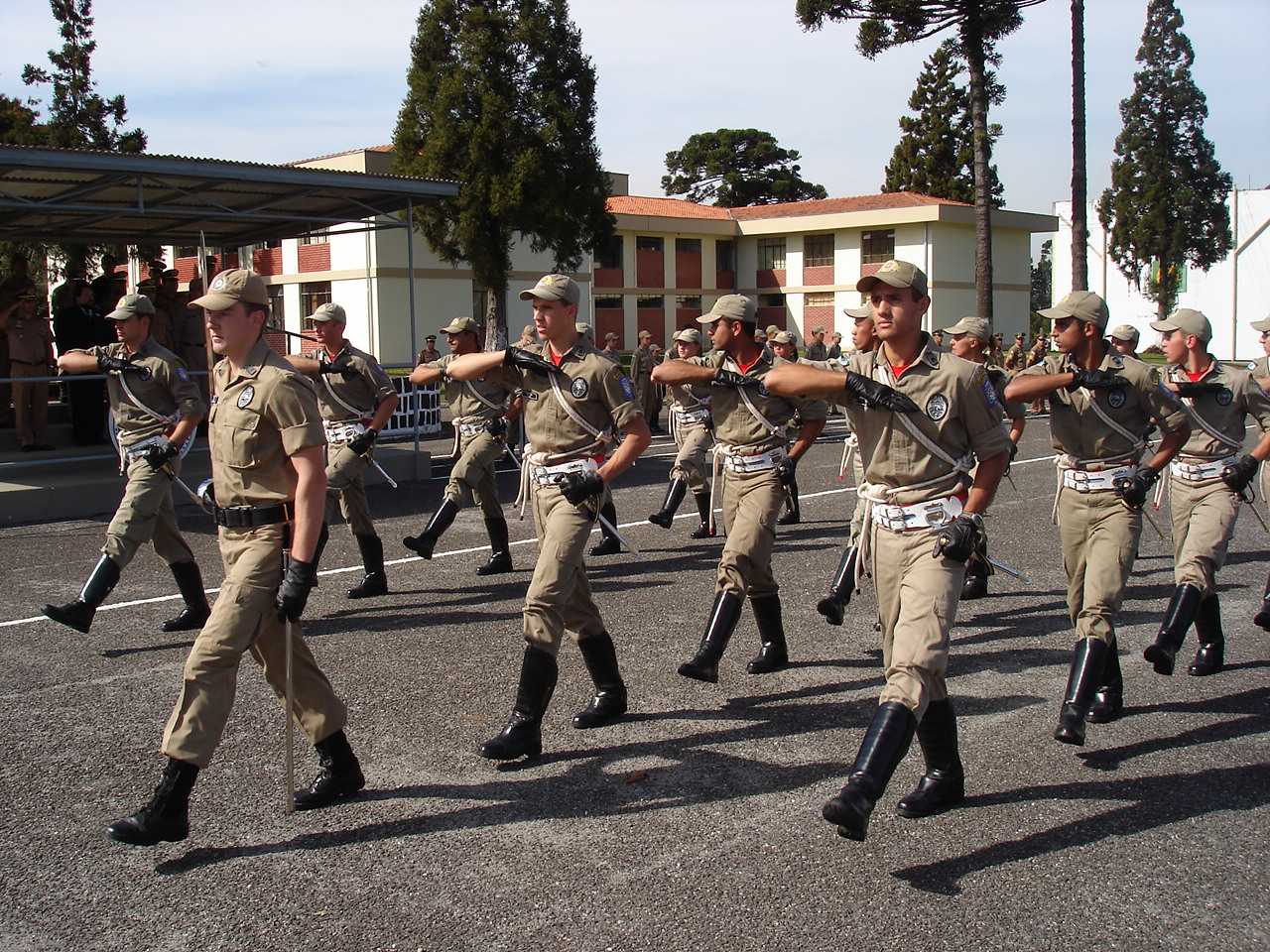
Firefighters with gymnastic belt.

This situation was altered again after the Revolutions of 1930 and 1932; demilitarization of the CBMs was imposed by the Federal Government in 1934 to diminish the power of the military forces of the States, which threatened the balance of power in the country. With the end of World War II, and the fall of the Estado Novo (Portuguese: New State), the forces in the States reverted to full State control; once again allowing the militarization of the CBMs, since these were incorporated into the Military Police.

In 1967 the Inspectorate General of Military Police (Portuguese: Inspetoria Geral das Polícias Militares – IGPM) was created, reporting to the Ministry of War, which is responsible for coordinating and conducting control activities over the Military Police (and Firefighters Corps).

With the end of the Military Government and the institution of a new Constitution in 1988, the States were granted autonomy to administer their security forces as best suited them. The majority opted to separate the Firefighters Corps from the Military Police. The term "Military" was inserted in 1990 to distinguish the Military Firefighters Corps from organizations of civilian and voluntary firefighters.

Starting 2013, the MFC also has full operational duties over the civilian private firefighting academies in order to combat corruption in the civil fire services.

== Emergency telephone number ==
In all of Brazil, the emergency telephone number of the Military Firefighters Corps is one, nine, three (193). It is a toll-free call.

== Stable belt/Gymnastic belt ==
The Gymnastic belt (Portuguese: cinto ginástico) is one of the essential elements of the uniforms of the Military Firefighters Corps; which has been used with few modifications, since 1887. At first the belt was reinforced, made of cotton and leather, enabling it to serve as a climbing harness. Today it is not as strong and only serves as a ceremonial item.

There are only two models of belts:

Officers belt has a horizontal strip in blue colour, with the buckles in silver metal. In the 1960s the leather parts were painted white.

non-commissioned officers and enlisted ranks (Sergeants, corporals, and privates) The belt is in red colour, with the buckles in gold metal.

== Rank insignia ==
Officers

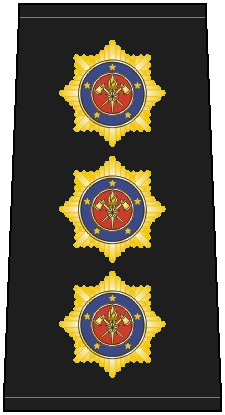
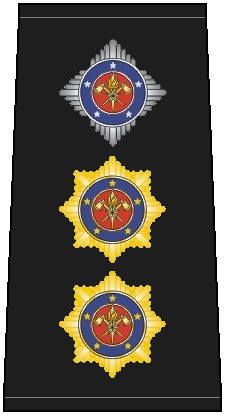
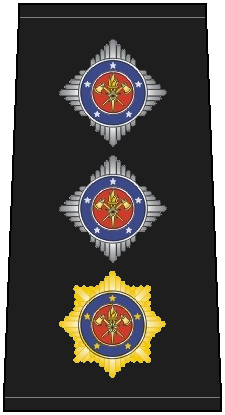
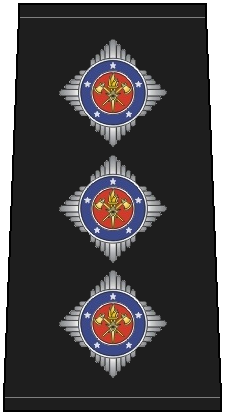
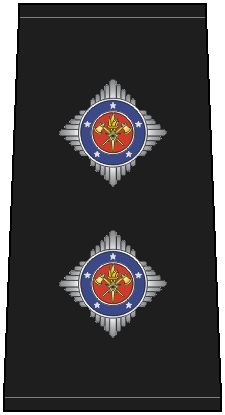
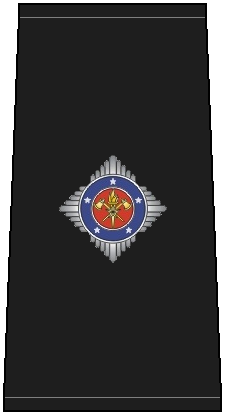
Rank group	General / flag officers	Senior officers			Junior officers
(Brazil) Military Firefighters Corps
(Brazil) Military Firefighters Corps		Coronel	Tenente-coronel	Major	Capitão	Primeiro tenente	Segundo tenente

Student officers

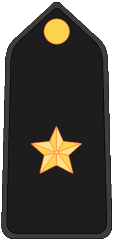
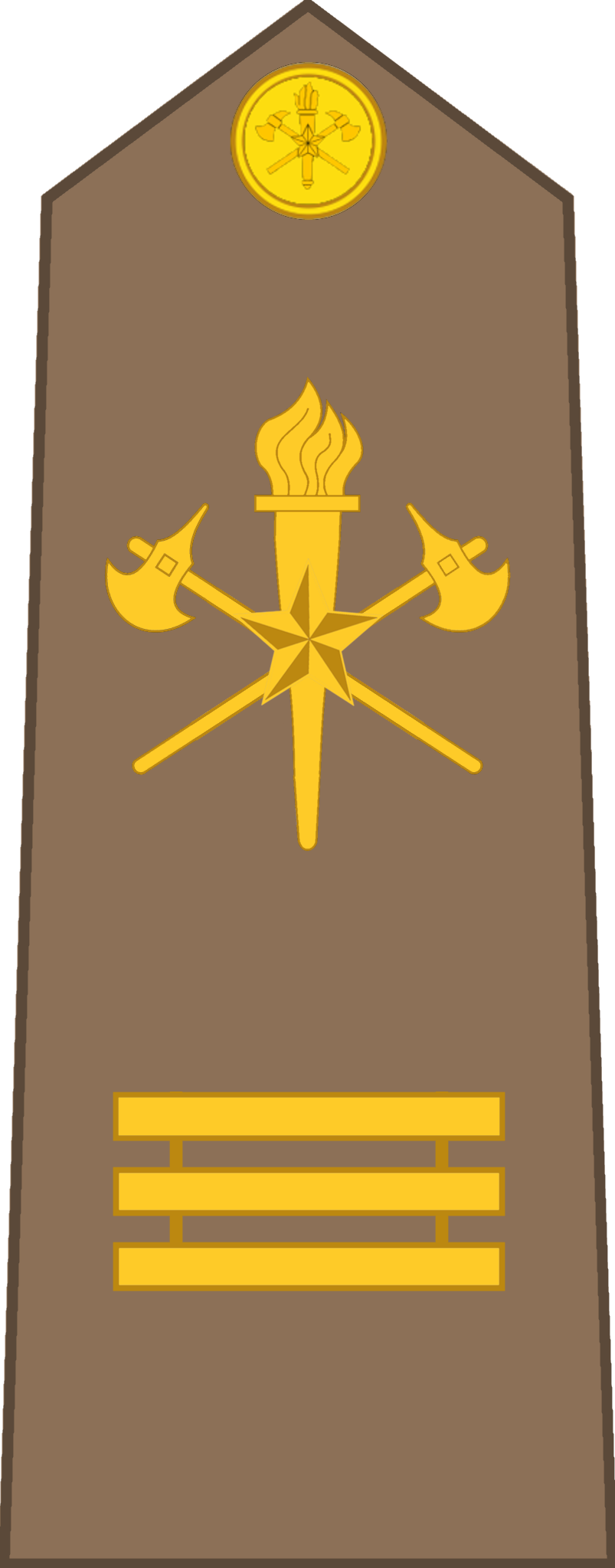
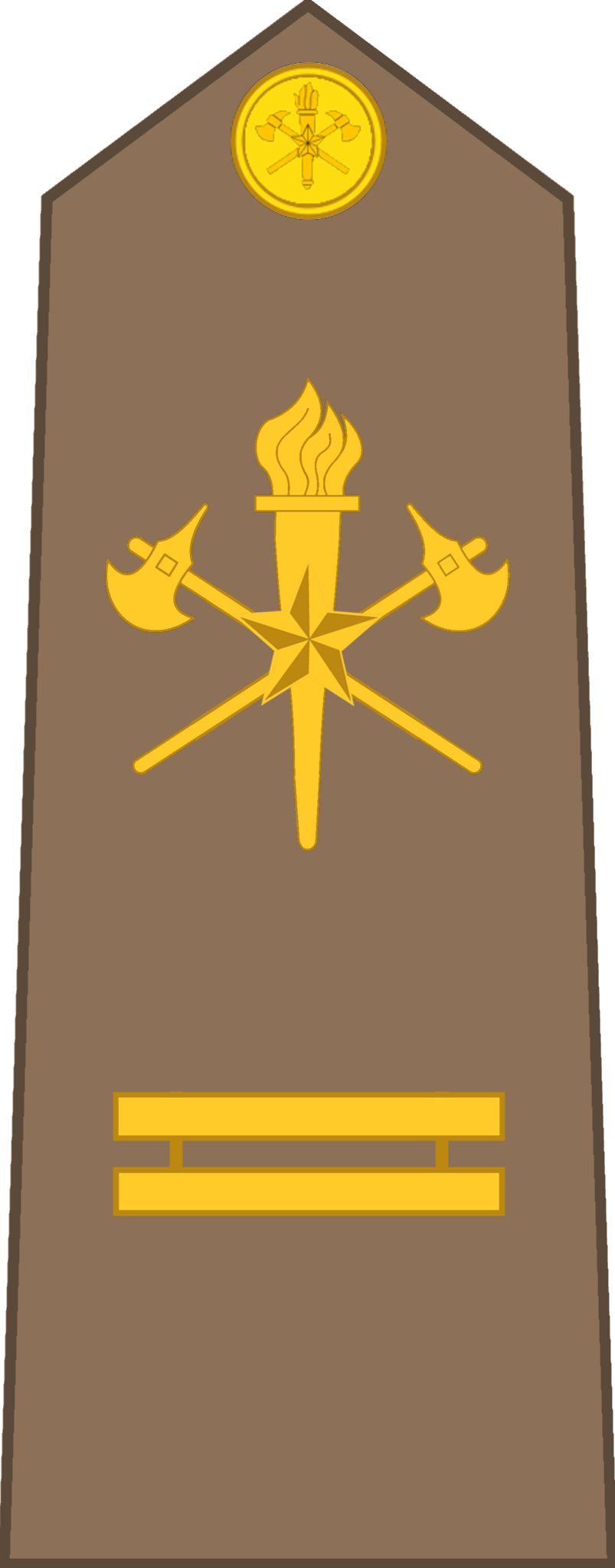
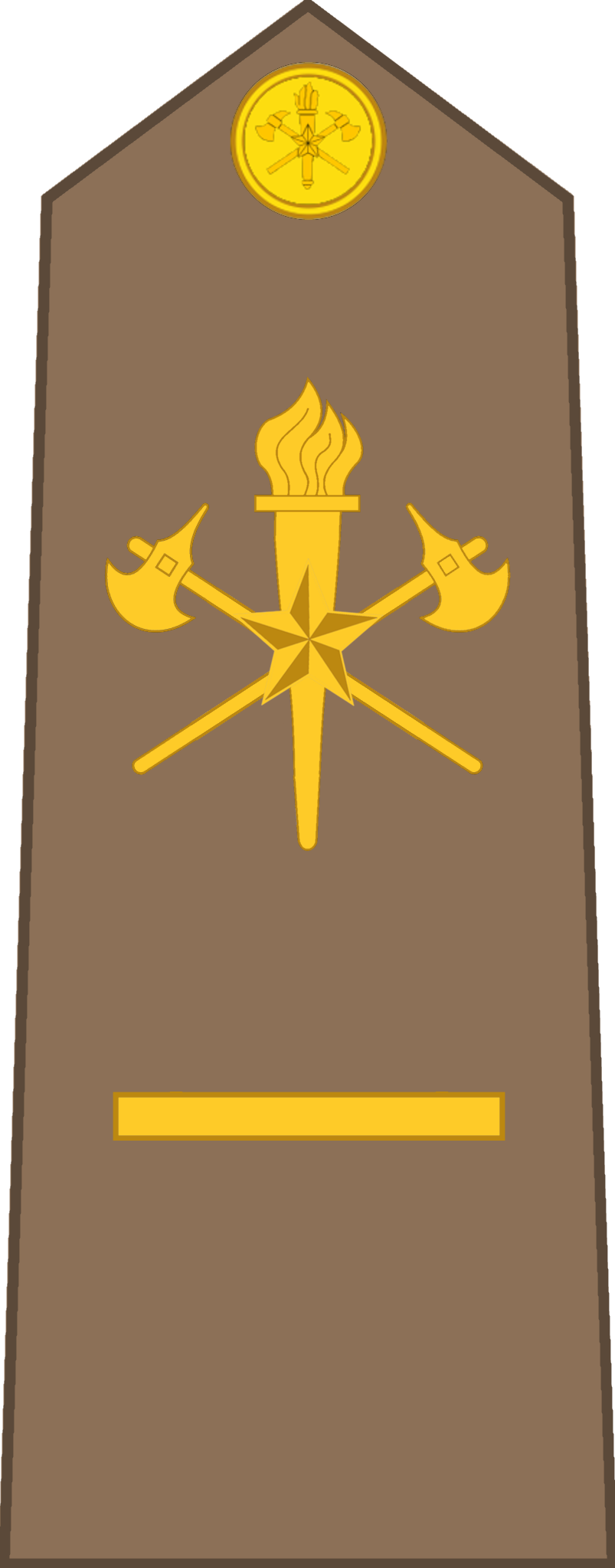
Rank group	Junior officer	Student officer/Cadets
Rank group	Junior officer	5th year	4th year	3rd year	2nd year	1st year
(Brazil) Military Firefighters Corps
(Brazil) Military Firefighters Corps	Aspirante			Aluno-oficial 3° ano	Aluno-oficial 2° ano	Aluno-oficial 1° ano

NCO and enlisted grades

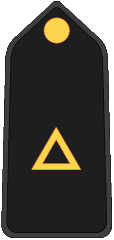
Rank group	Senior NCOs				Junior NCOs	Enlisted
(Brazil) Military Firefighters Corps
(Brazil) Military Firefighters Corps	Subtenente	Primeiro-sargento	Segundo-sargento	Terceiro-sargento	Cabo	Bombeiro primeira classe	Bombeiro segunda classe

Student NCOs

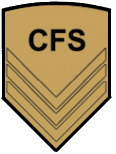
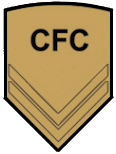
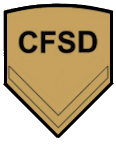
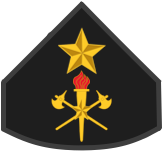
Rank group	Sargeants candidates	Corporal candidates	Soldier candidates
Military Firefighters Corps
Military Firefighters Corps	Aluno-Sargento (PB)	Aluno-Cabo (PB)	Aluno-Soldado (PB)	Aluno-Soldado (PR)

== Inspectorate General ==
The Inspectorate General of Military Police is a command element of the Brazilian Army, responsible for coordinating and conducting activities of control over the Military Police and Military Firefighters Corps of the States. It is part of the Land Operations Command (Portuguese: Comando de Operações Terrestres) and its mission is:

- The establishment of principles, guidelines and standards for the effective implementation of control and coordination of the Military Police under the command of the Army, through its Military Area Commands, Regions, and other major military commands;
- The control of the organization and regulation, personnel and equipment, such as weapons, ammunition, communications equipment, chemical agents, military equipment, vehicles, aircraft and boats;

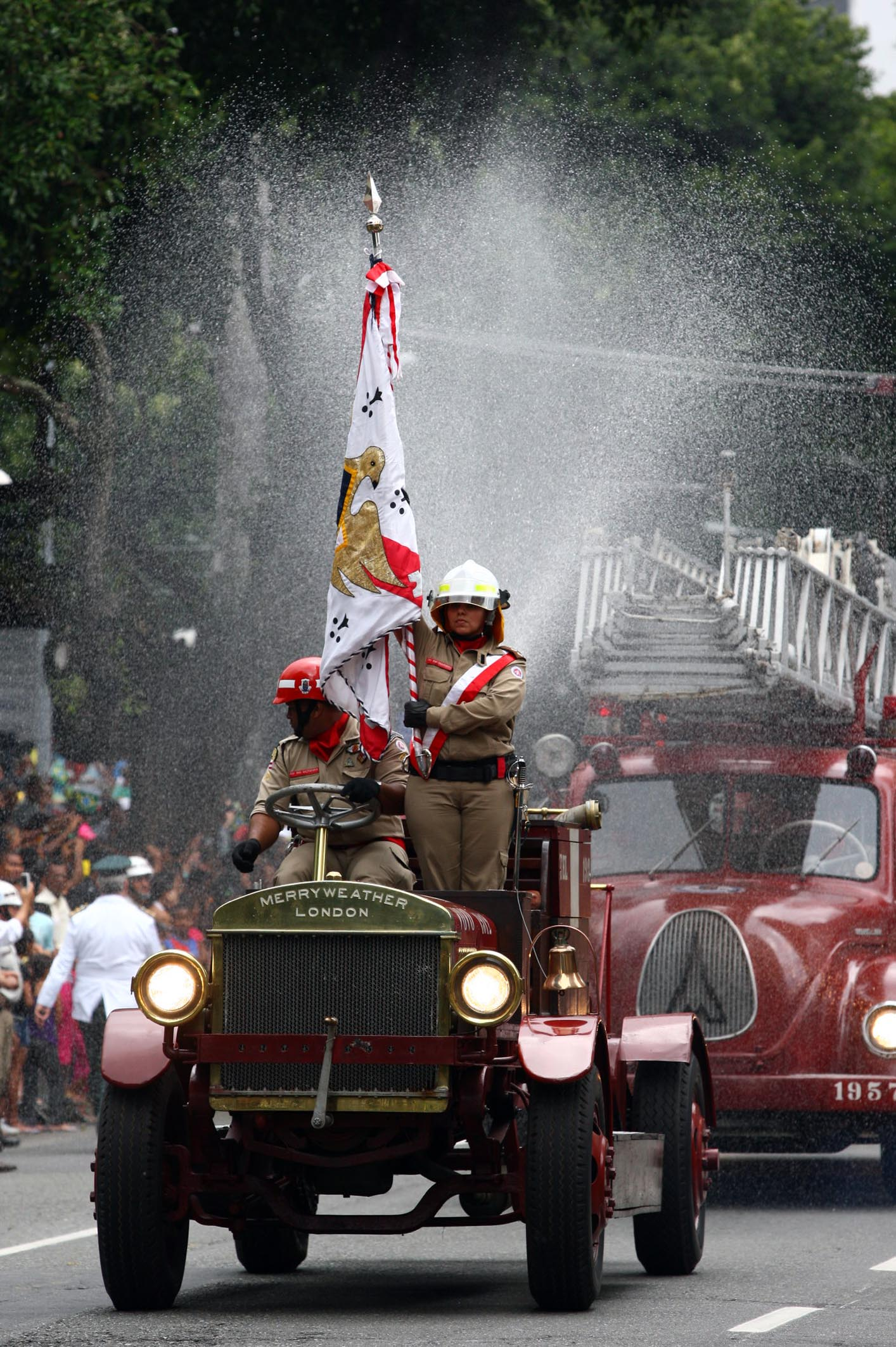
Military Firefighters of Bahia.

- Collaboration in studies aiming at rights, justice and guarantees of the military forces of the States, and the establishment of conditions commensurate mobilization;
- Coordinating and monitoring compliance with the provisions of relevant state and federal legislation;
- Conduction of regular inspections of the firefighter bases and equipment.

== Military Firefighters Corps National League ==
Established on July 8, 2004, during the 7th National Firefighters Conference, the National League is mandated to, among others support all national civil defense and security policies, enforce civil defense laws and regulations, and promote the latest technological advances in firefighting.

== List by State ==
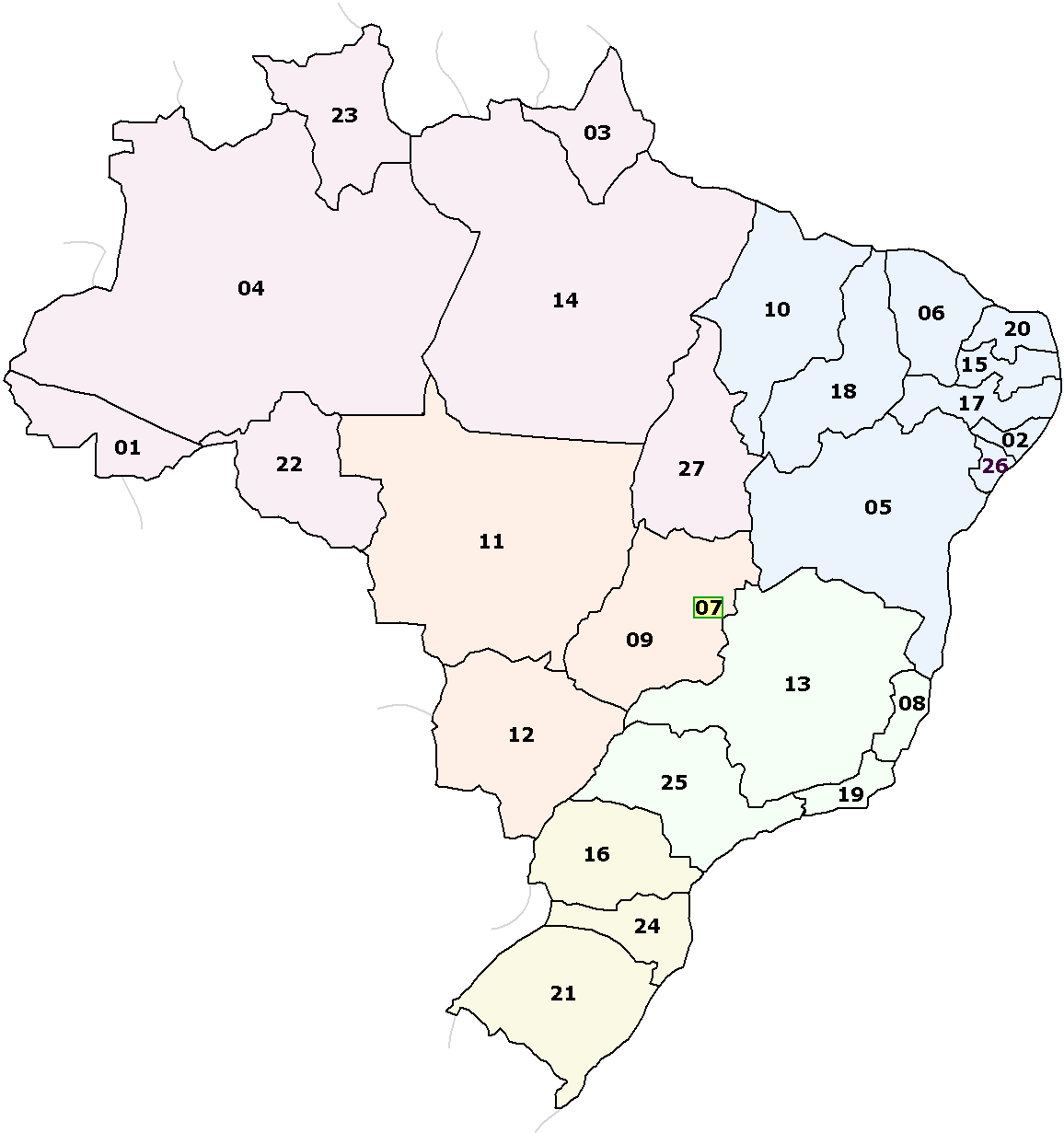
  - 01 . CBMAC - Acre
  - 02 . CBMAL - Alagoas
  - 03 . CBMAP - Amapá
  - 04 . CBMAM - Amazonas
  - 05 . CBMBA - Bahia
  - 06 . CBMCE - Ceará
  - 07 . CBMDF - Distrito Federal
  - 08 . CBMES - Espírito Santo
  - 09 . CBMGO - Goiás
  - 10 . CBMMA - Maranhão
  - 11 . CBMMT - Mato Grosso
  - 12 . CBMMS - Mato Grosso do Sul
  - 13 . CBMMG - Minas Gerais
  - 14 . CBMPA - Pará
  - 15 . CBMPB - Paraíba
  - 16 . CBMPR - Paraná
  - 17 . CBMPE - Pernambuco
  - 18 . CBMPI - Piauí
  - 19 . CBMERJ - Rio de Janeiro
  - 20 . CBMRN - Rio Grande do Norte
  - 21 . CBMRS - Rio Grande do Sul
  - 22 . CBMRO - Rondônia
  - 23 . CBMRR - Roraima
  - 24 . CBMSC - Santa Catarina
  - 25 . CBPMESP - São Paulo
  - 26 . CBMSE - Sergipe
  - 27 . CBMTO - Tocantins

Note: The Military Firefighters Corps of São Paulo is still operated by its homonymous Military Police.

== See also ==
- Brazilian Armed Forces
- Military Police (Brazil)
