= Military Police of Paraná State =

Police in Brazil

Military Police of Paraná State Polícia Militar do Estado do Paraná
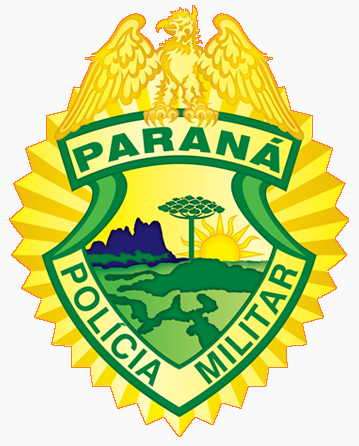

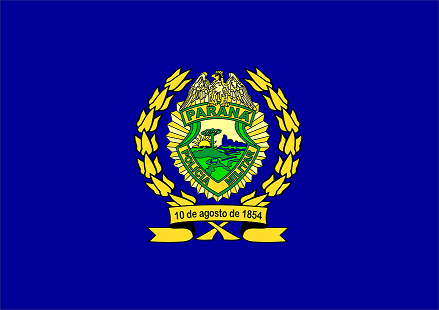
- Abbreviation: PMPR
- Motto: Your protection is our commitment. Sua proteção é nosso compromisso.

Agency overview
- Formed: 10 August 1854.

Jurisdictional structure
- Operations jurisdiction: Paraná, Brazil
- Map of police jurisdiction
- Area: 199,314.9 km^{2} (76,955.9 sq mi)
- Population: 10,387,378 (2006)
- Constituting instrument: Article 42 of Constitution of Brazil
- General nature: Gendarmerie

Operational structure
- Headquarters: Curitiba

Website
- www.pm.pr.gov.br

The Military Police of Paraná State (Portuguese: Polícia Militar do Estado do Paraná, PMEP), like other military polices in Brazil is a reserve and ancillary force of the Brazilian Army, and part of the System of Public Security and Brazilian Social Protection. Its members are called State Military personnel.

The primary mission of PMPR is the ostensible and preventive policing for the maintenance of public order in the State of Paraná.

== History ==
The Military Police of Paraná was created as a unit of Skirmishers on August 10, 1854, under the name of the Police Force, like a military company. This origin is due to military necessity of the Empire of Brazil in reinforcing the troops of the Army in emergency situations. With the Proclamation of the Republic of Brazil has adopted a Constitution based on the United States where the states have a large autonomy. With that the police have become small regional armies.

The history of PMPR shows an honorable participation in the events that marked Brazilian national life at that time.

- Paraguayan War
- Federalist Revolution
- Contestado War
- Revolt of 1924
- Revolution of 1930
- Revolution of 1932

This dangerous situation for the national unity remained until the end of the World War II, with the deposition of the dictatorial government of Getúlio Vargas. It was only from 1946 that the military police who have purchased the configuration now, a kind of gendarmerie which is subject to the States.

== Historic designations ==
- 1854 – Police Force.
- 1874 – Police Corps.
- 1891 – Military Police Corps.
- 1892 – Security Regiment.
- 1917 – Military Force.
- 1932 – Public Force.
- 1939 – Police Force.
- 1946 – Military Police.

== Organization ==
The PMPR is operationally organized into battalions, companies, and platoons; and administratively, in departments. The battalions are based in major urban centers, and their companies and platoons are distributed according to population density in cities.
The Military Police of Paraná is present in all cities of the State.

=== Battalions of Military Police ===
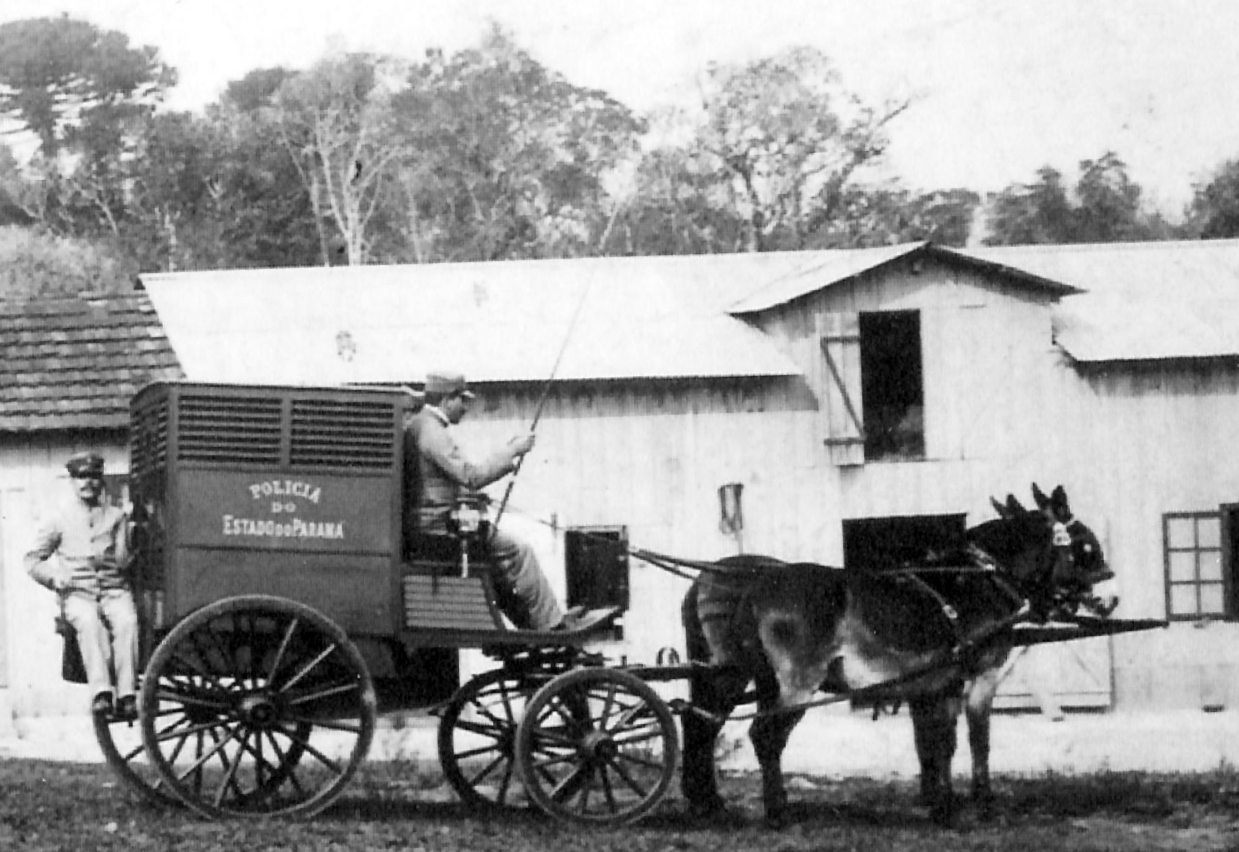
Vehicle for transport of prisoners - 1909.

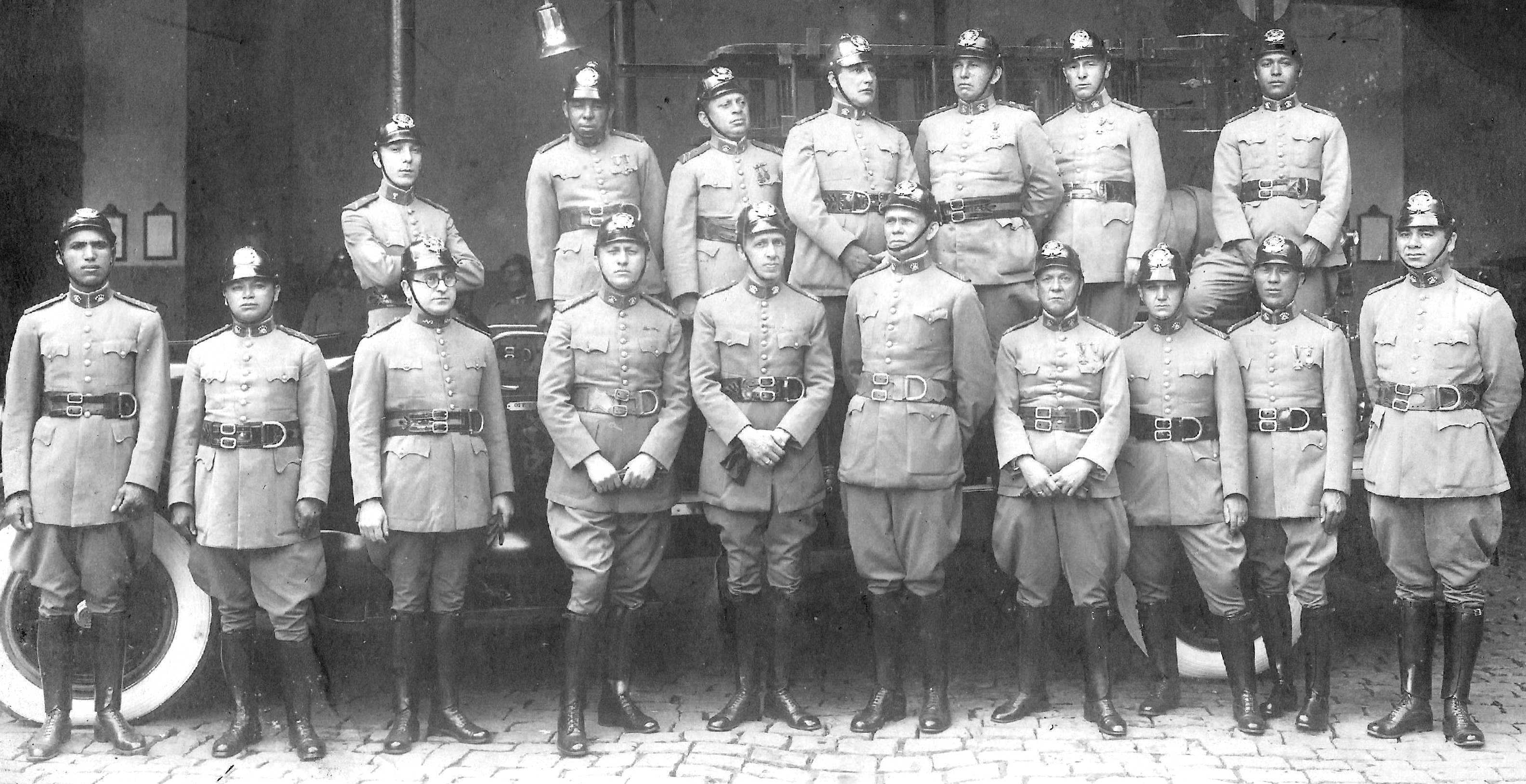
Firefighters Officers - 1923.

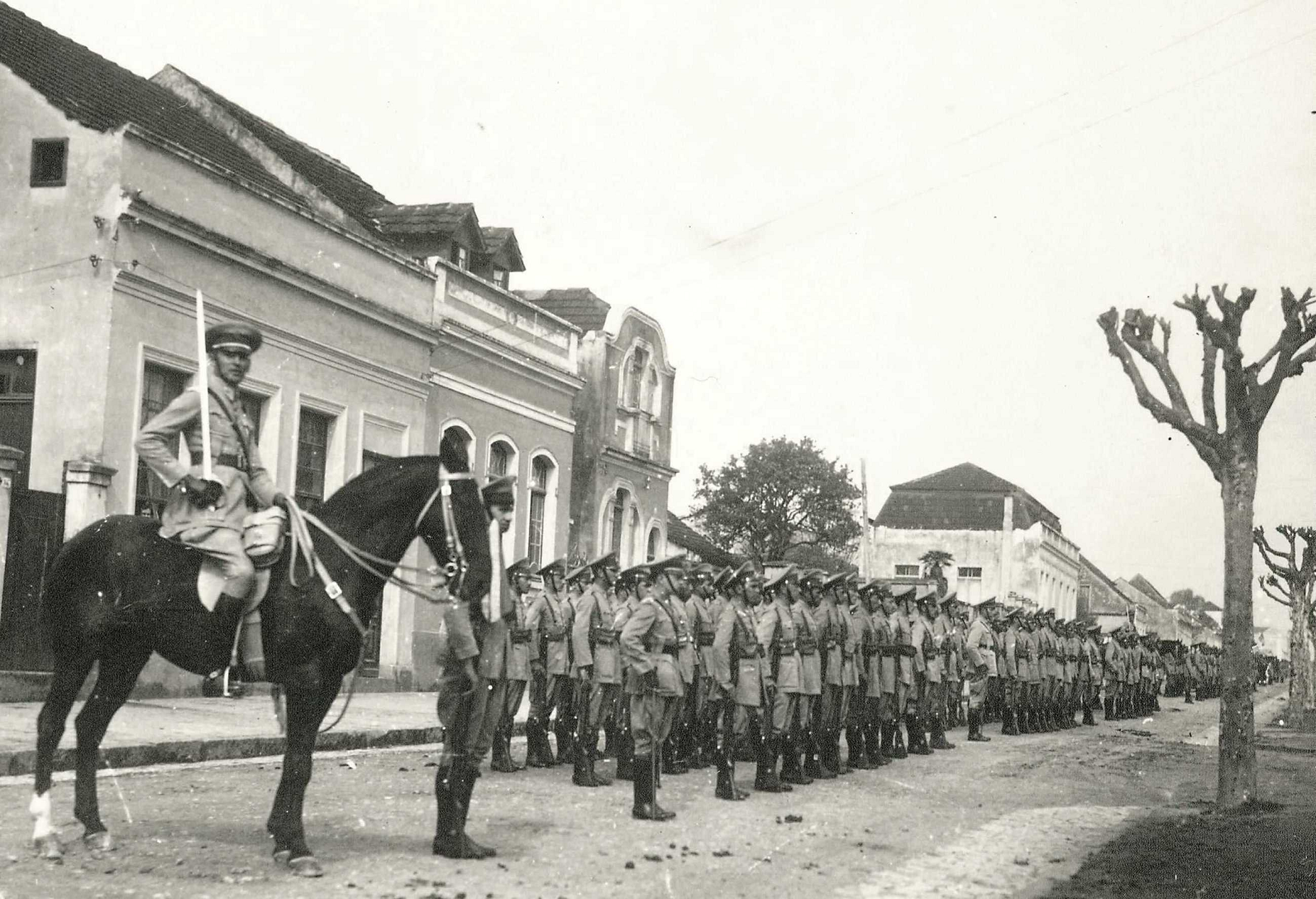
Parade of Independence of Brazil - 1938.

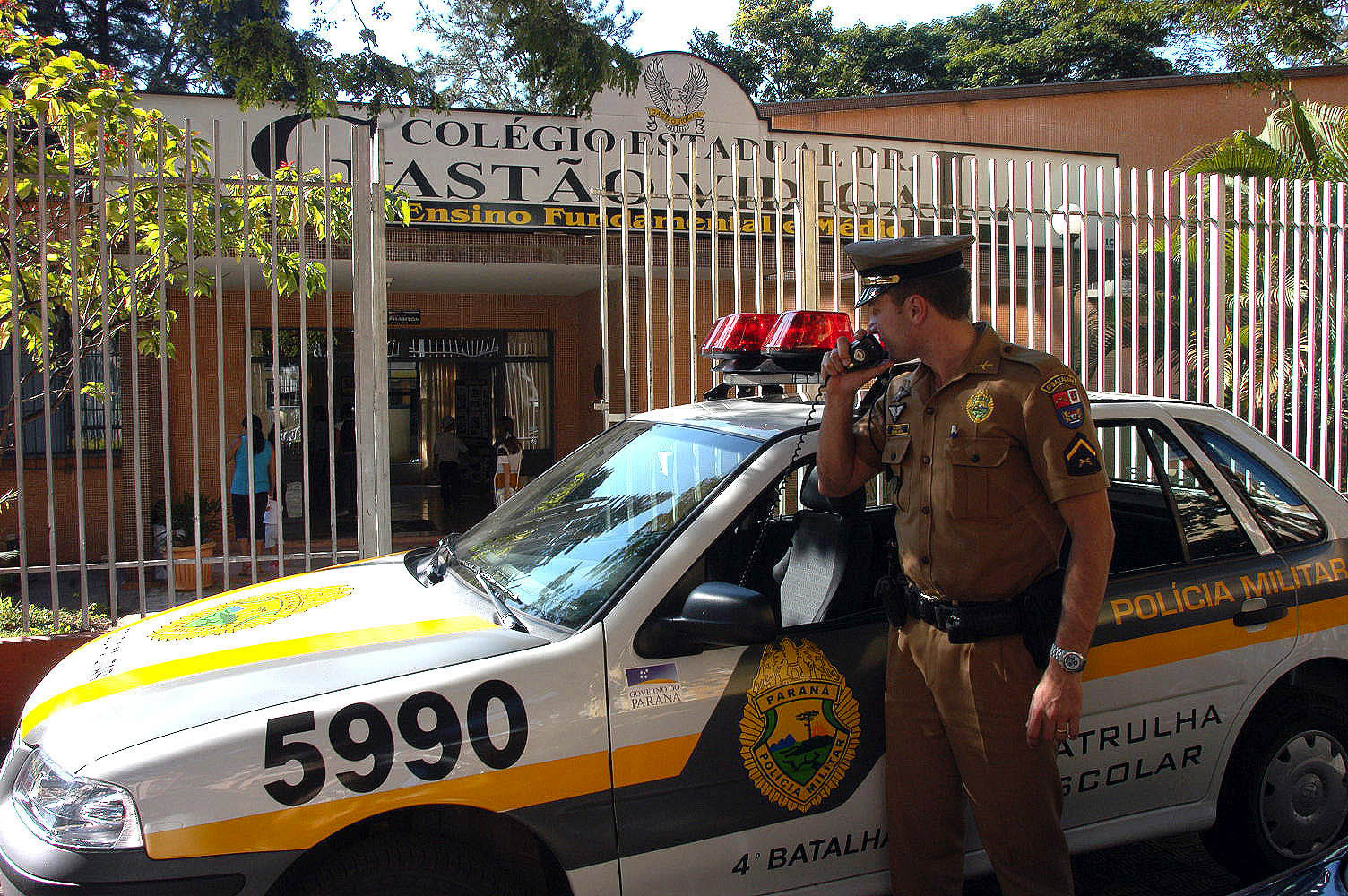
School Patrol - 2008.

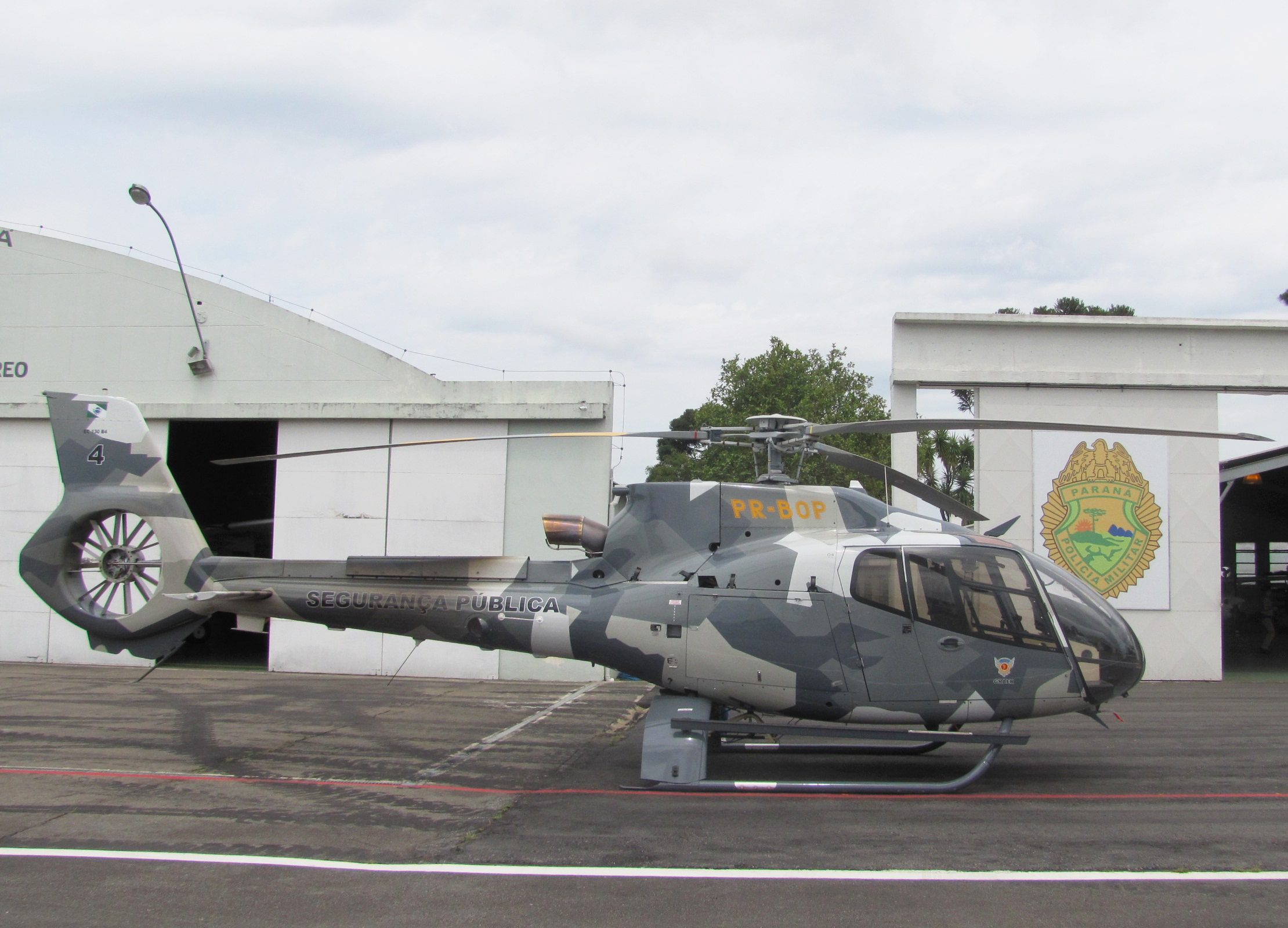
Air Groupment of Police and Rescue - 2011.

- 1st Battalion of Military Police - Ponta Grossa;
- 2nd Battalion of Military Police - Jacarezinho;
- 3rd Battalion of Military Police - Pato Branco;
- 4th Battalion of Military Police - Maringá;
- 5th Battalion of Military Police - Londrina;
- 6th Battalion of Military Police - Cascavel;
- 7th Battalion of Military Police - Cruzeiro do Oeste;
- 8th Battalion of Military Police - Paranavaí;
- 9th Battalion of Military Police - Paranaguá;
- 10th Battalion of Military Police - Apucarana;
- 11th Battalion of Military Police - Campo Mourão;
- 12th Battalion of Military Police - Curitiba;
- 13th Battalion of Military Police - Curitiba;
- 14th Battalion of Military Police - Foz do Iguaçu;
- 15th Battalion of Military Police - Rolândia;
- 16th Battalion of Military Police - Guarapuava;
- 17th Battalion of Military Police - São José dos Pinhais;
- 18th Battalion of Military Police - Cornélio Procópio;
- 19th Battalion of Military Police - Toledo;
- 20th Battalion of Military Police - Curitiba;
- 21st Battalion of Military Police - Francisco Beltrão;
- 22nd Battalion of Military Police - Colombo;
- 23rd Battalion of Military Police - Curitiba;
- 25th Battalion of Military Police - Umuarama;

=== Independent Companies of Military Police ===
- 1st Independent Company of Military Police - Lapa;
- 2nd Independent Company of Military Police - União da Vitória;
- 3rd Independent Company of Military Police - Telêmaco Borba;
- 4th Independent Company of Military Police - Londrina;
- 5th Independent Company of Military Police - Umuarama;
- 6th Independent Company of Military Police - Ivaiporã;
- 7th Independent Company of Military Police - Arapongas;
- 8th Independent Company of Military Police - Irati.

=== Special Units ===
- Regiment of Mounted Police;
- Battalion of Control of Urban Traffic;
- Battalion of Highway Patrol;
- Battalion of Security Prison;
- Battalion of Environmental Police;
- Battalion of School Patrol;
- Battalion of Special Operations;
- Battalion of Border Police;
  - Independent Company of Security Police.

=== Administrative Commands ===
- Medical Department;
  - Hospital of Military Police;
  - Veterinary Center;
- Department of Teaching;
  - Academy of Military Police;
  - School of Military Police;
- Department of Logistic Support;
- Department of Personnel;
- Department of Finance.

== Firefighters Corps ==
The Corps of Firefighters of Paraná was created in 1912. The corporation is militarized like the Paris Fire Brigade (France), and is subject to the structure of PMPR. One groupment is equivalent to a battalion, and a subgroupment is equivalent to a company. The groupments and subgroupments are based in major urban centers. In the smaller towns, fire fighting is carried out by small detachment of volunteer firefighters.

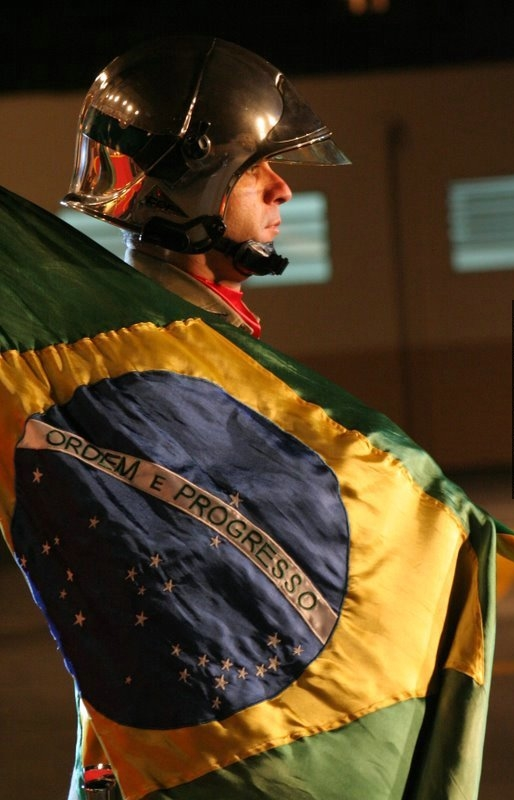
Standard-bearer.

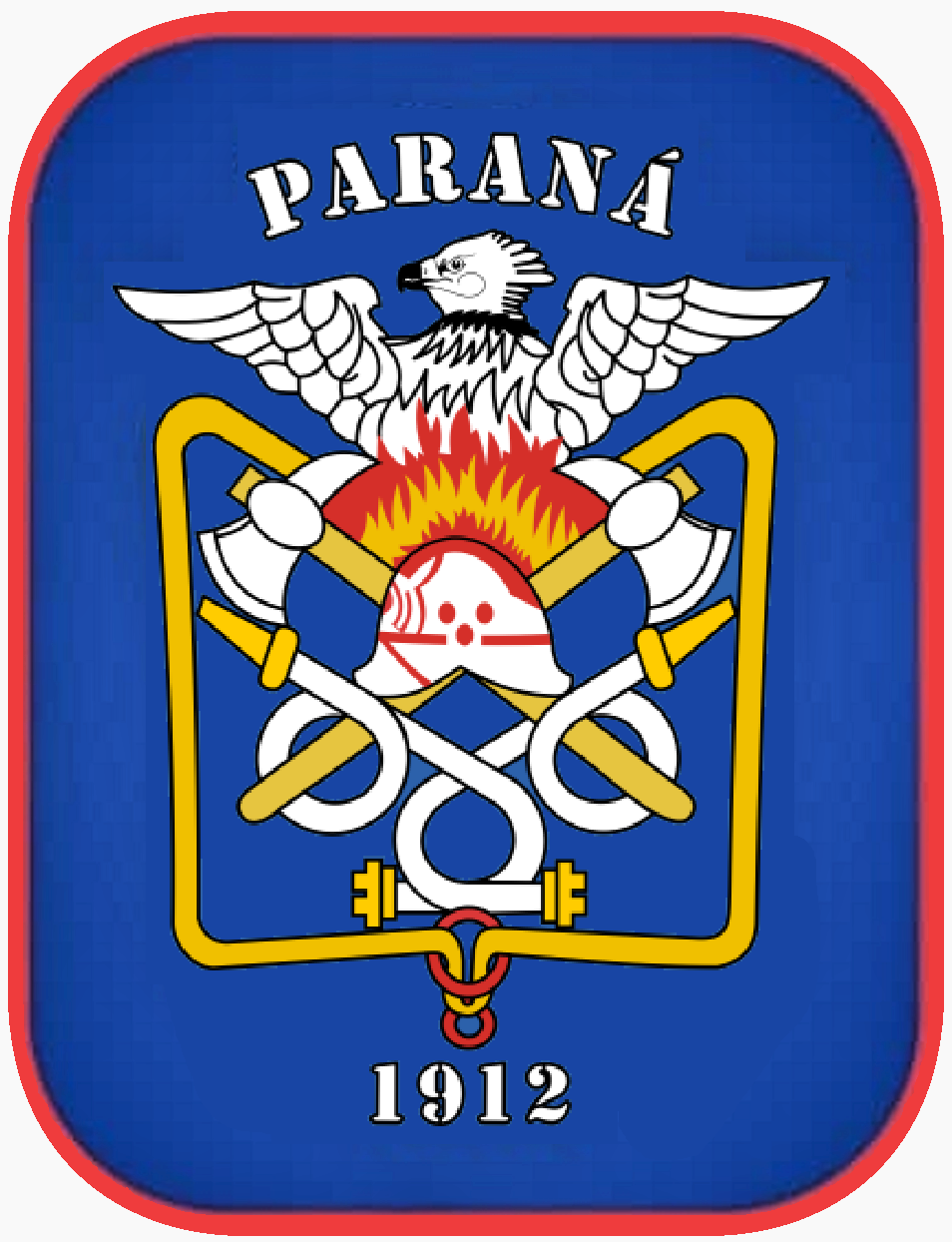

- 1st Groupment of Firefighters - Curitiba;
- 2nd Groupment of Firefighters - Ponta Grossa;
- 3rd Groupment of Firefighters - Londrina;
- 4th Groupment of Firefighters - Cascavel;
- 5th Groupment of Firefighters - Maringá;
- 6th Groupment of Firefighters - São José dos Pinhais;
- 7th Groupment of Firefighters - Curitiba;
- 8th Groupment of Firefighters - Paranaguá;
- 9th Groupment of Firefighters - Foz do Iguaçu;
  - 1st Independent Subgroupment of Firefighters - Ivaiporã;
  - 2nd Independent Subgroupment of Firefighters - Pato Branco;
  - 3rd Independent Subgroupment of Firefighters - Francisco Beltrão;
  - 4th Independent Subgroupment of Firefighters - Apucarana;
  - 5th Independent Subgroupment of Firefighters - Guarapuava;
  - 6th Independent Subgroupment of Firefighters - Umuarama;
  - Center for Teaching and Training - Piraquara.

=== Fire apparatus ===
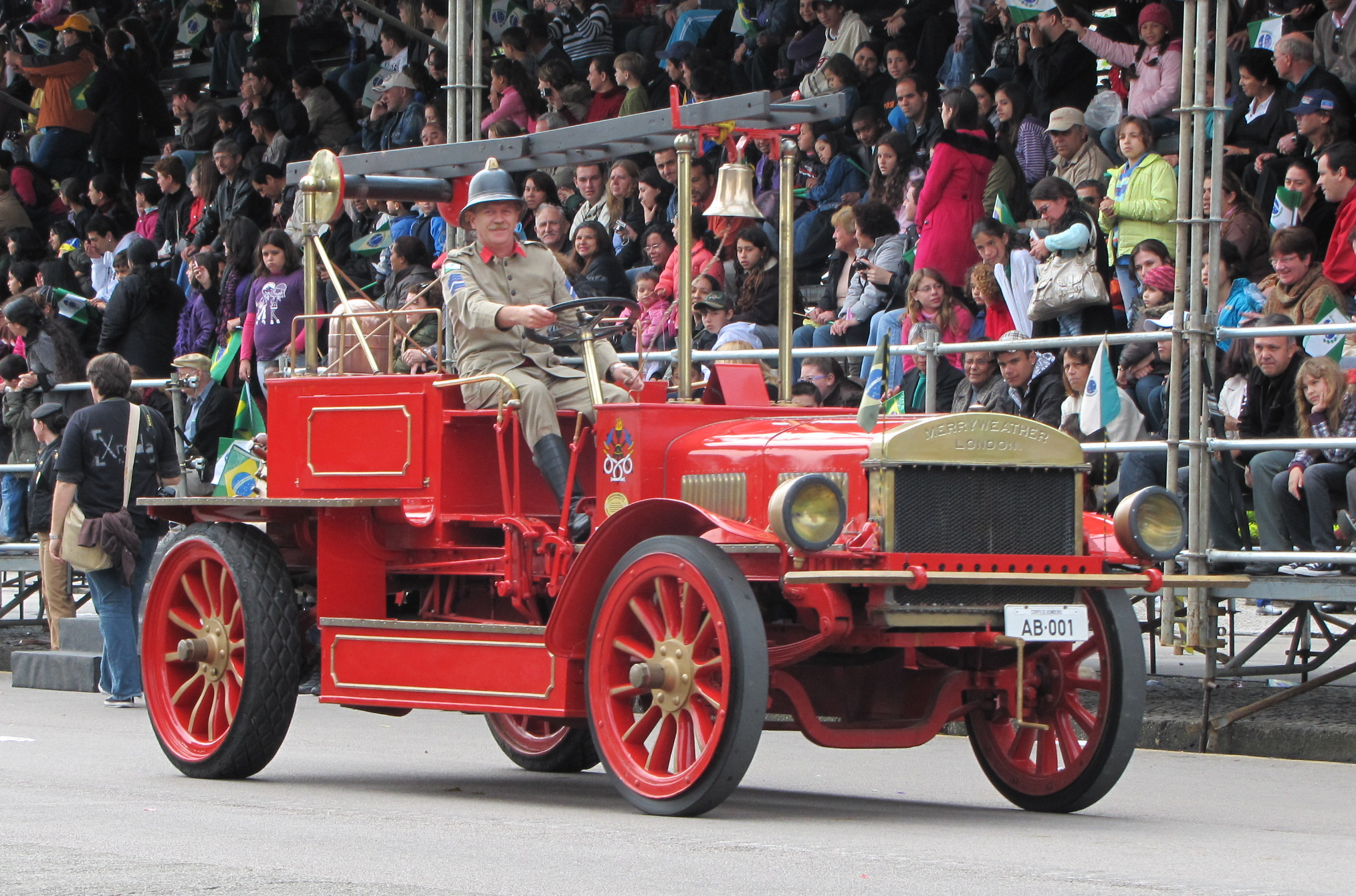

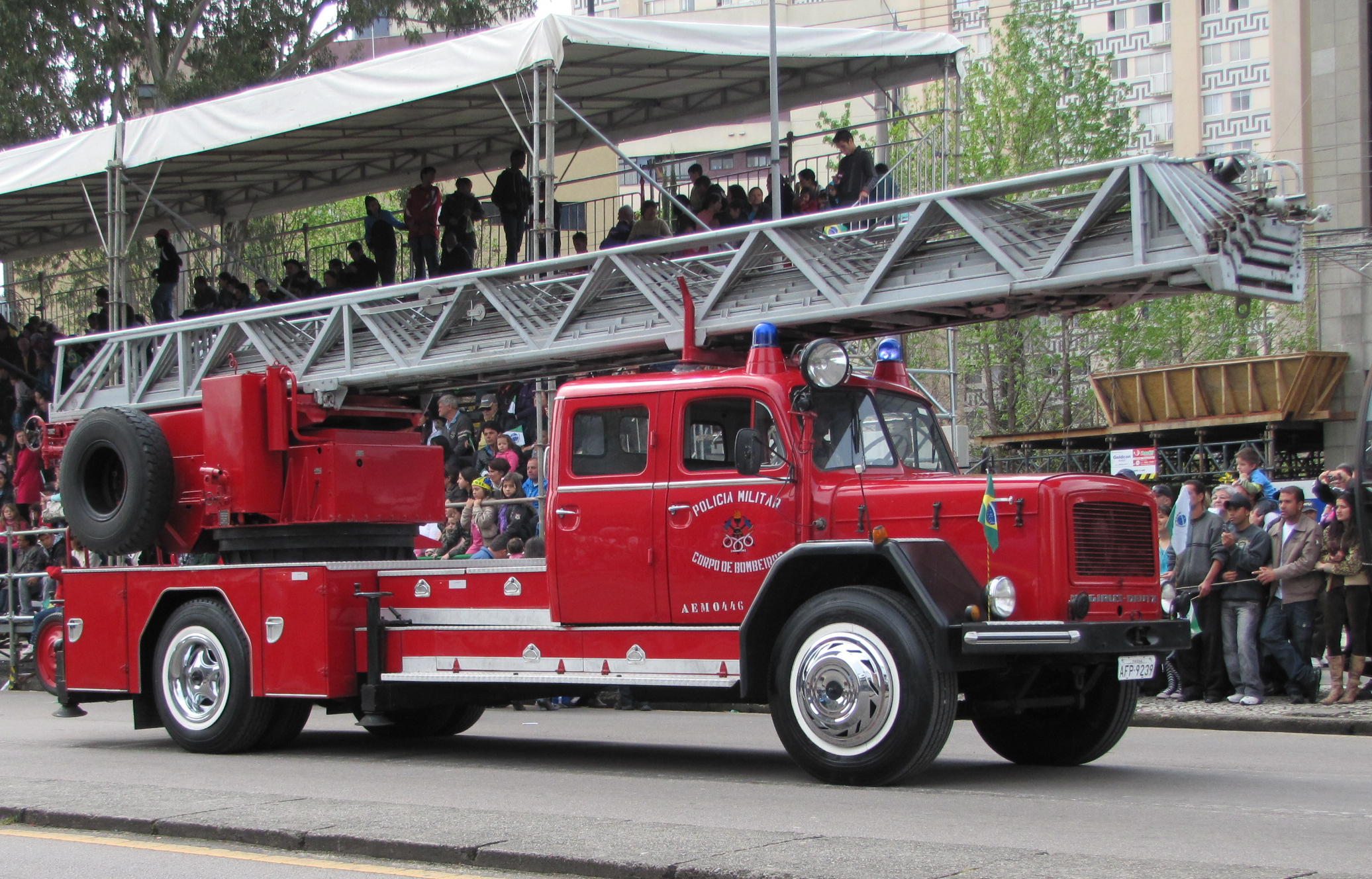

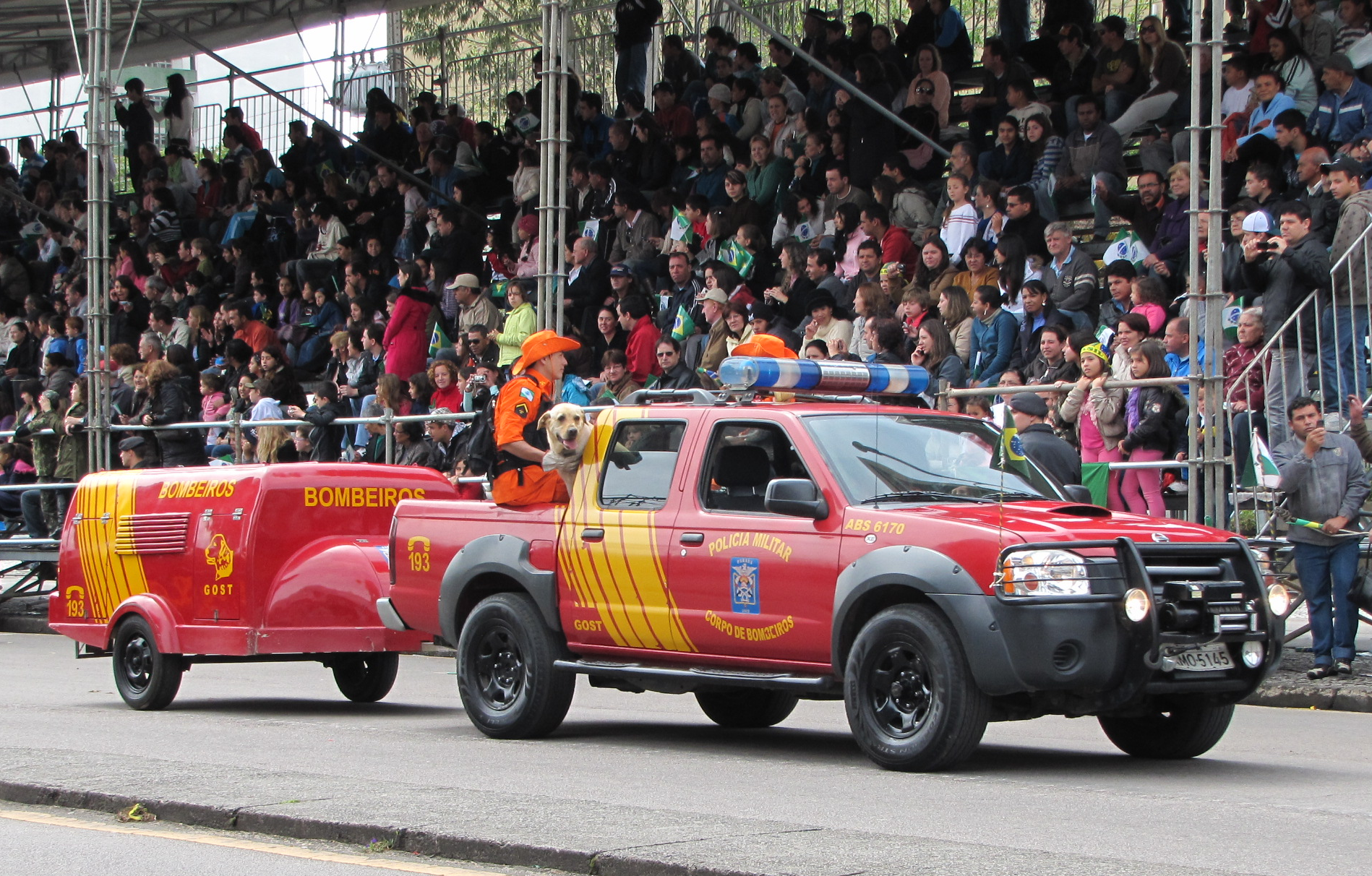

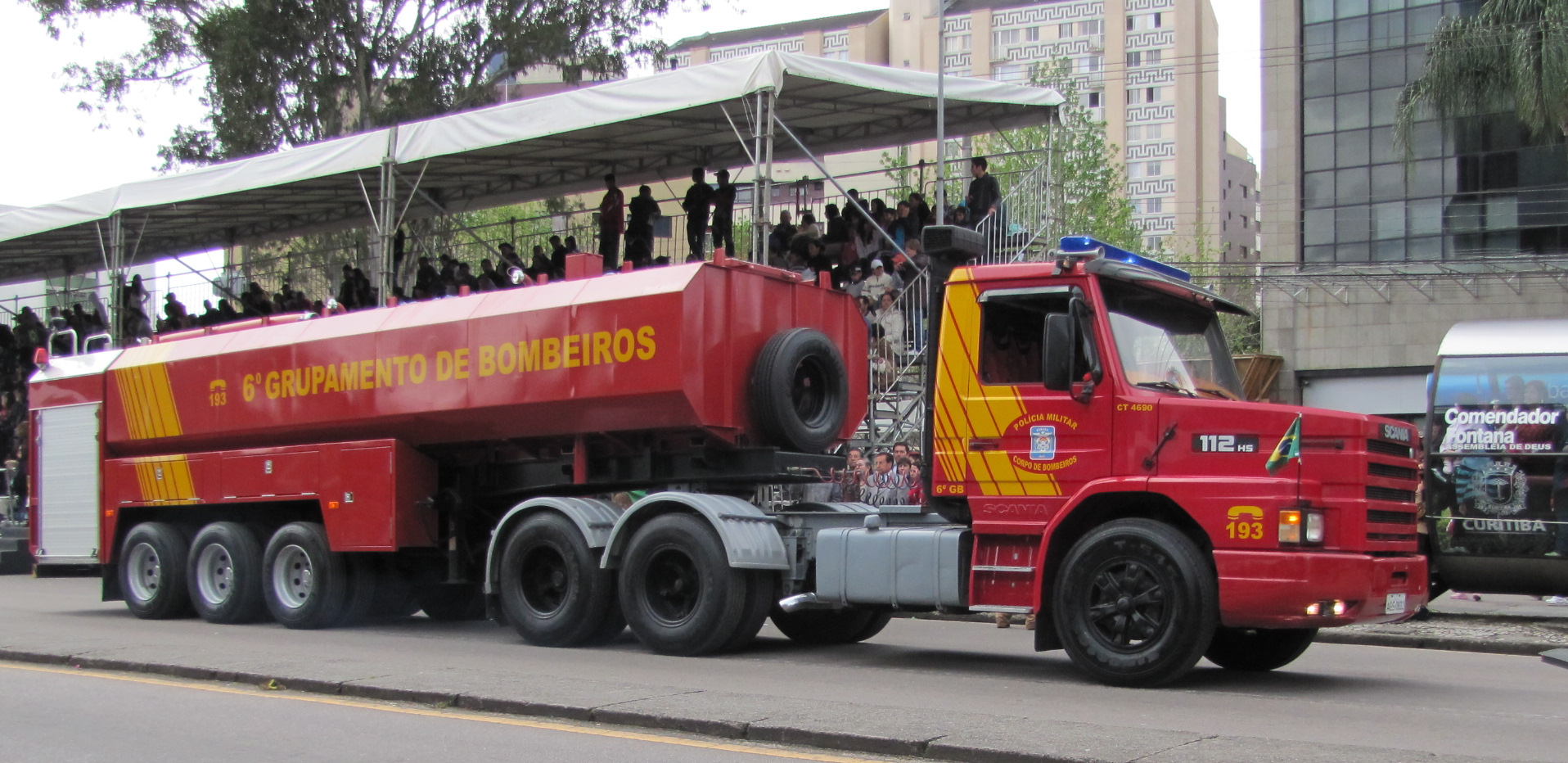

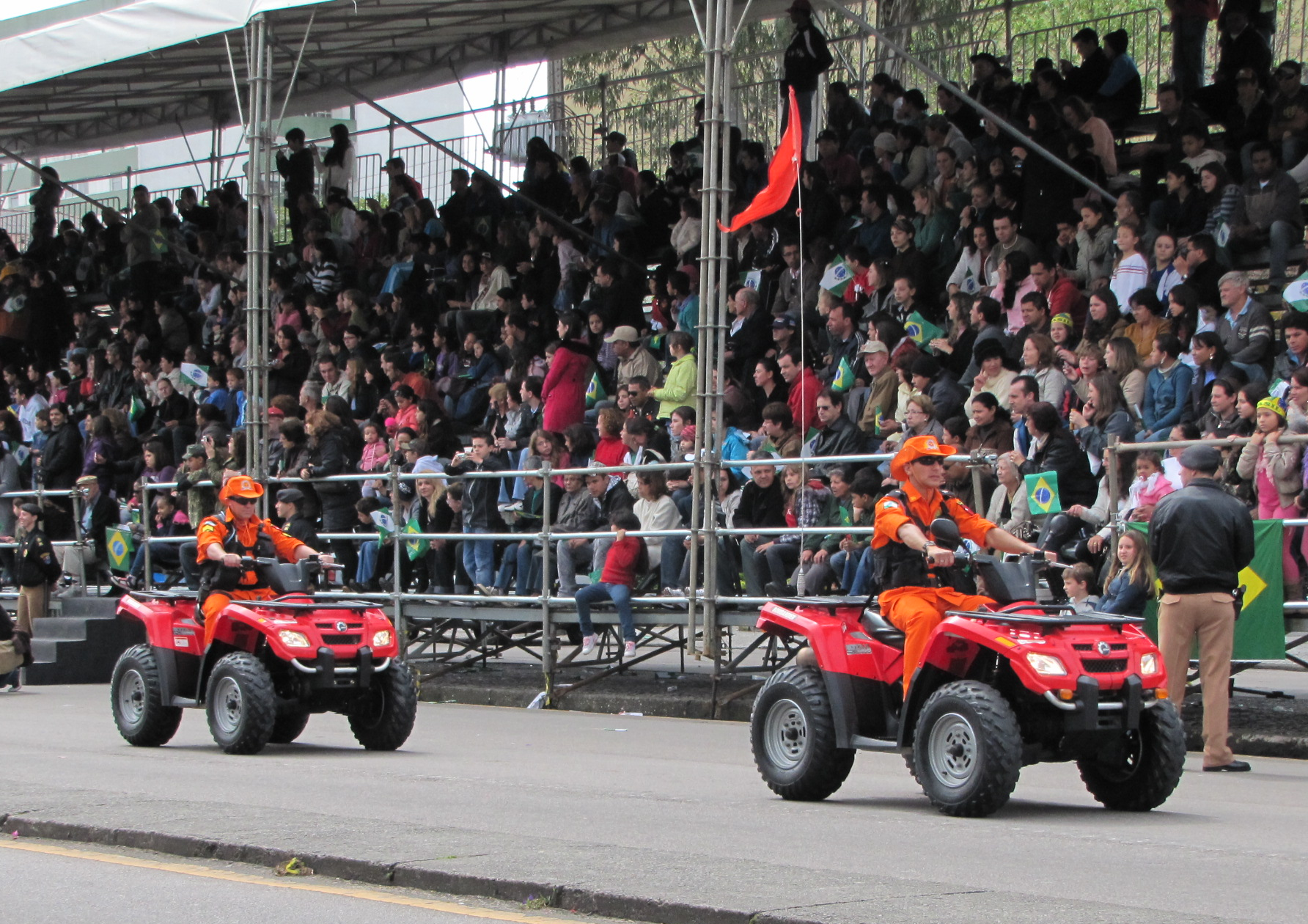

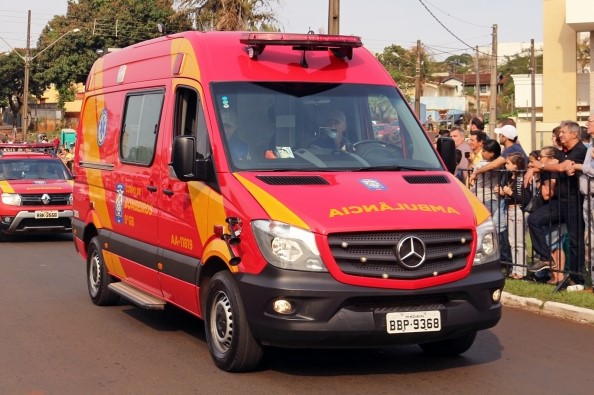

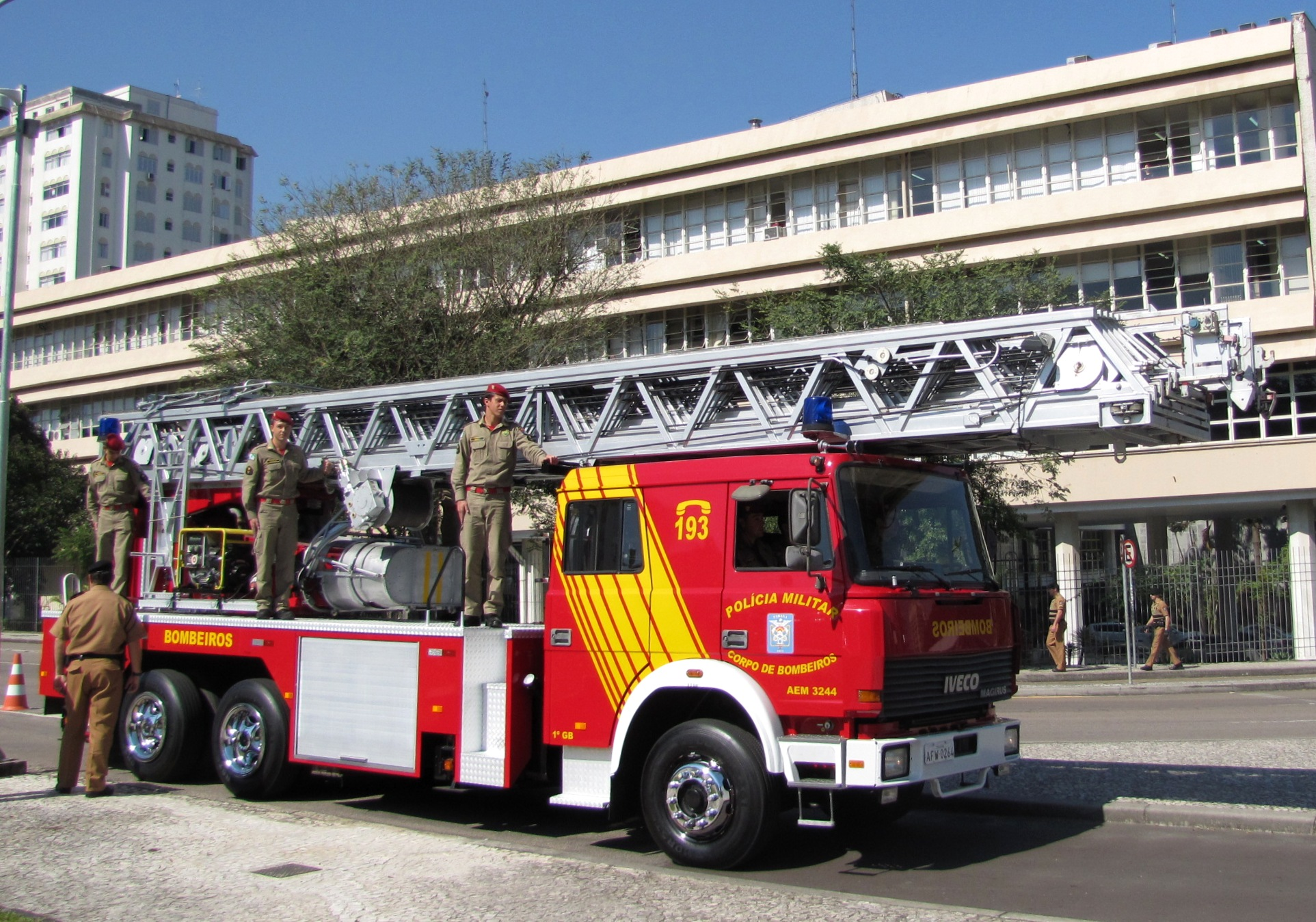

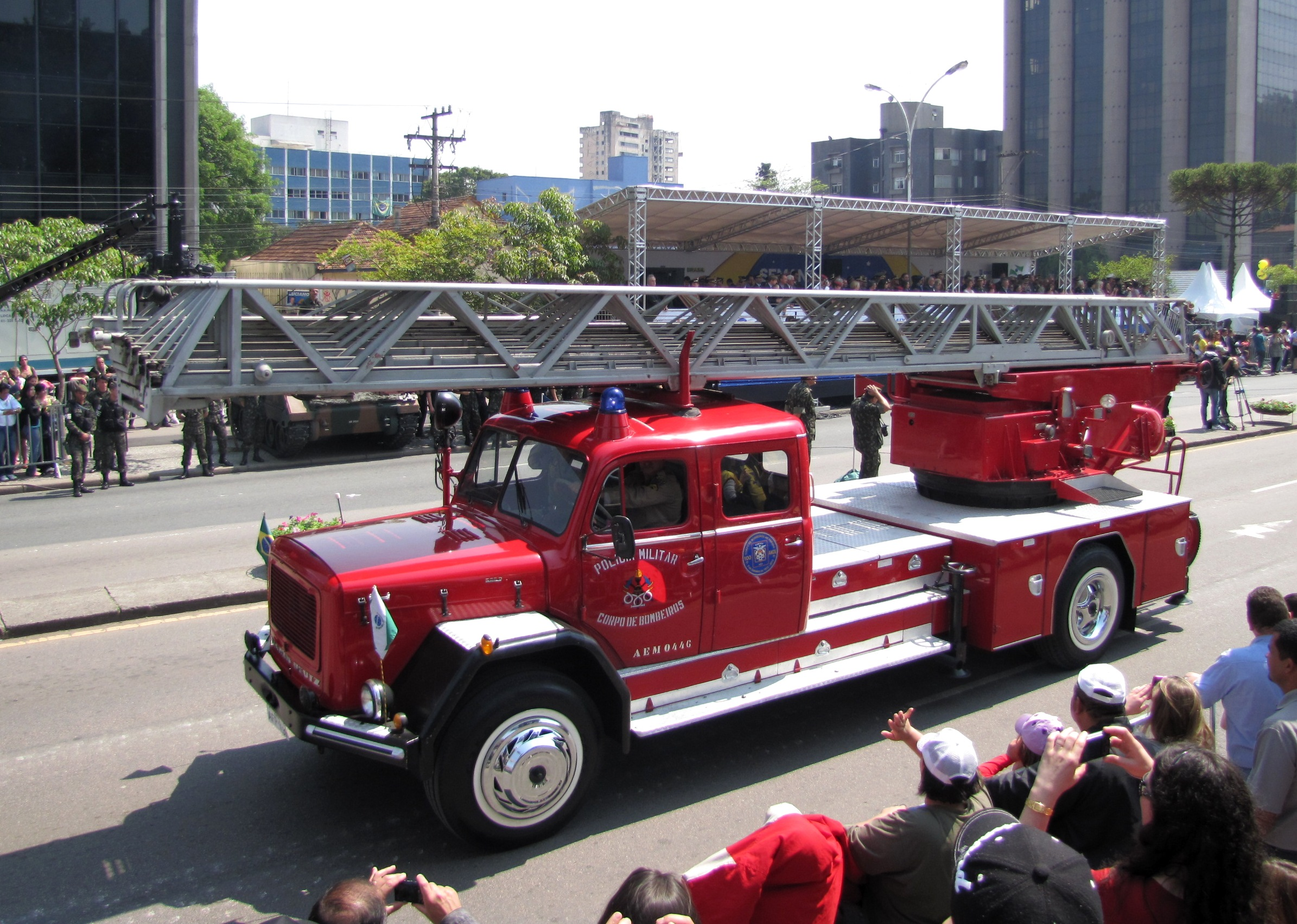

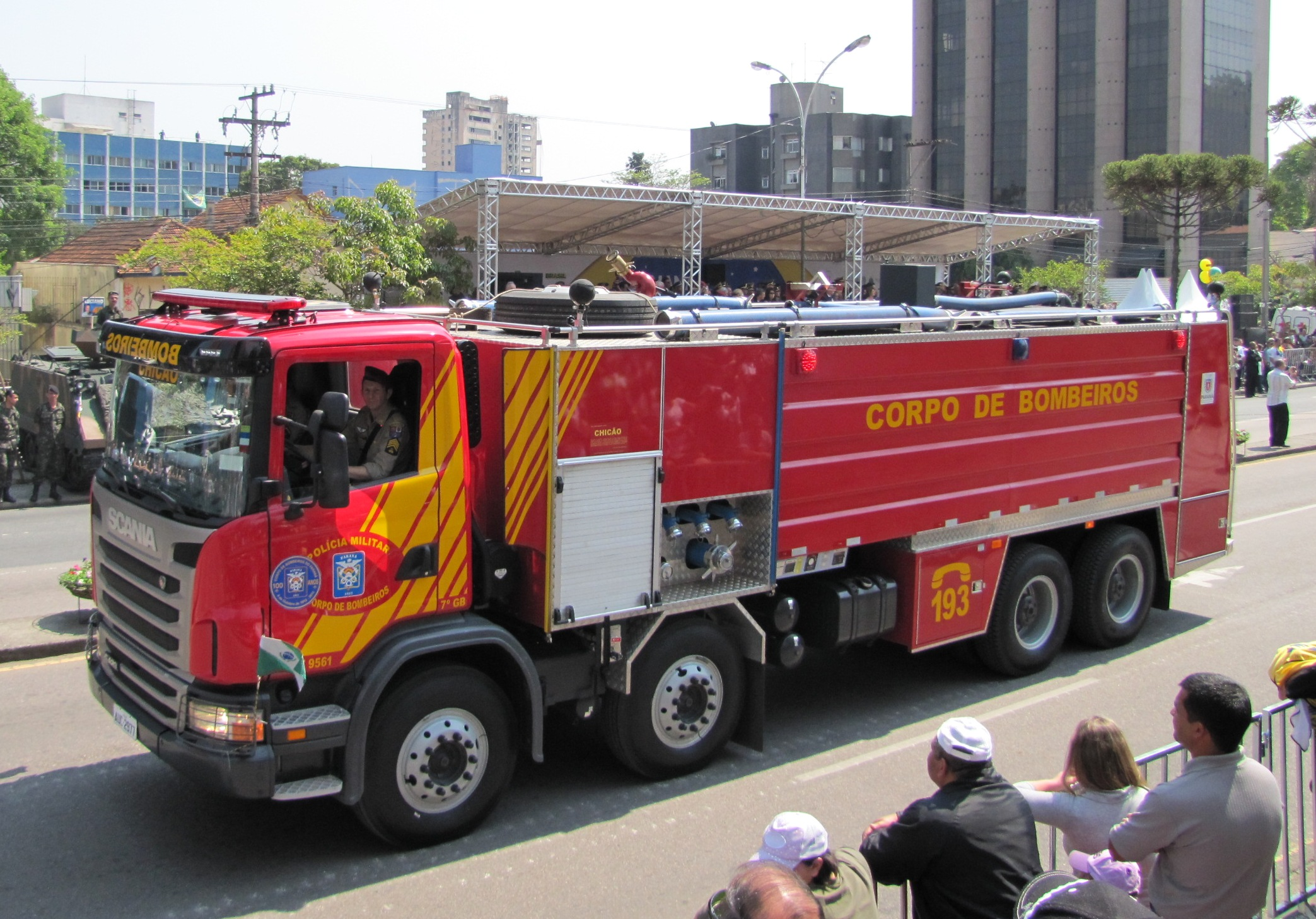

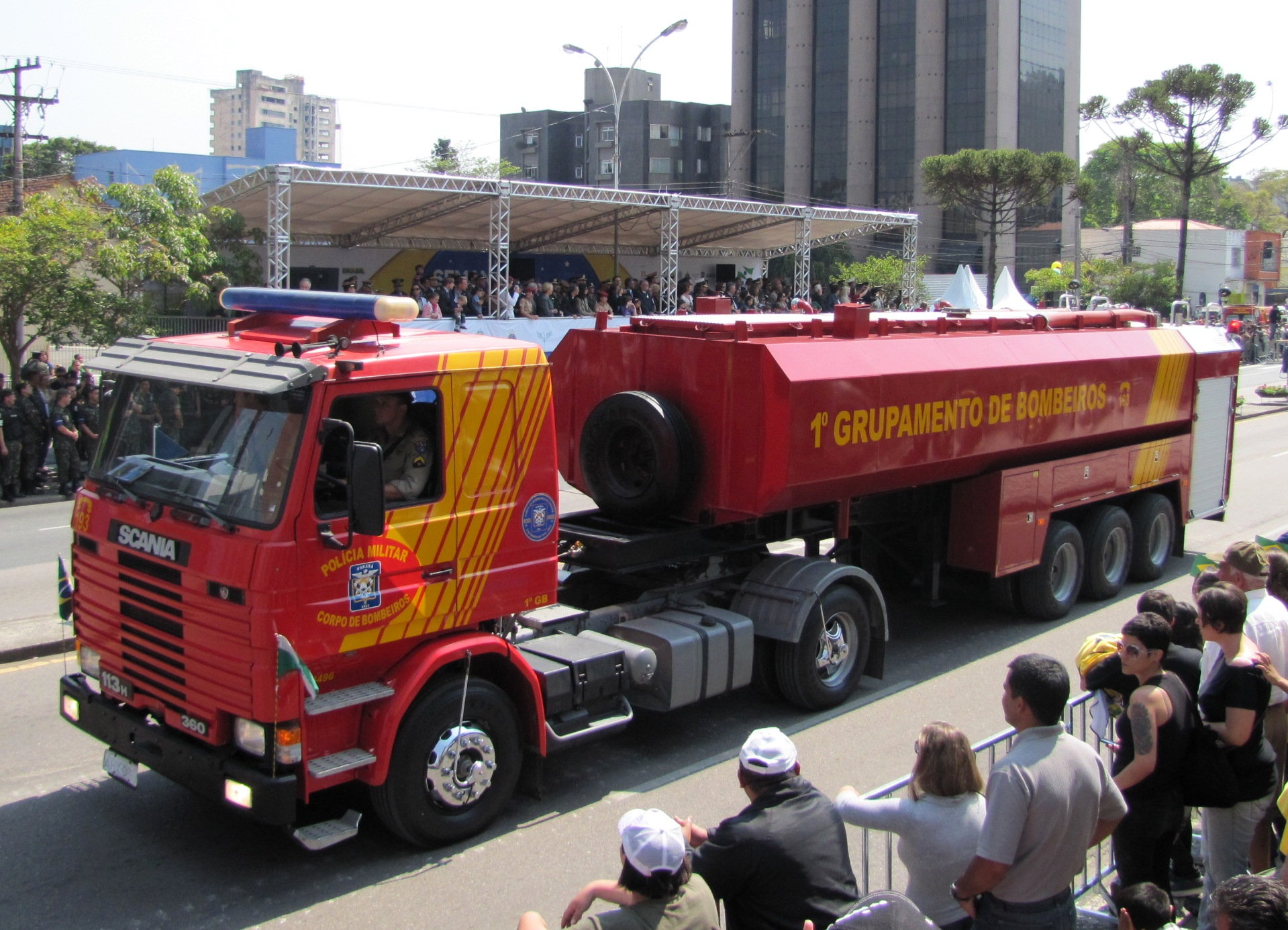

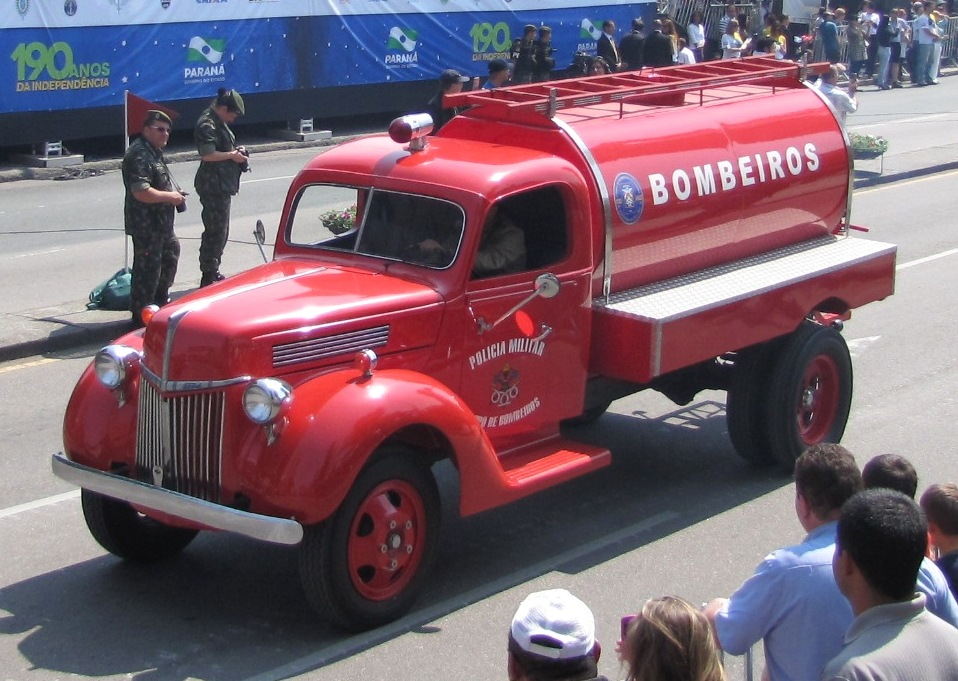

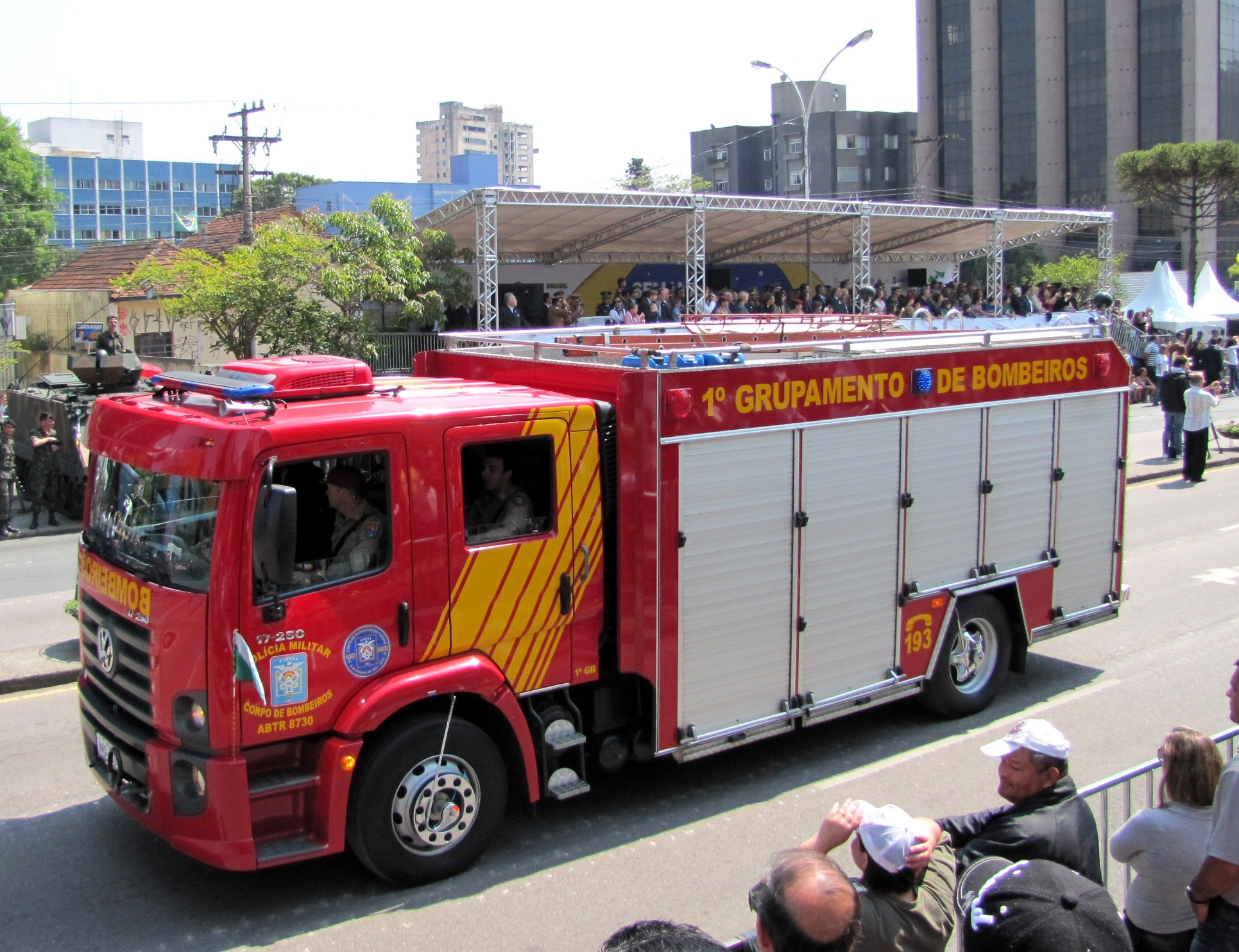

== Uniforms ==
From 1854 until the early years of the Republic, the PMPR used the dark blue in their uniforms. In 1912 was adopted the khaki color, which by tradition is still in use today. The firefighters wear the same uniforms of the Military Police, just adding their badges and insignias.

Full dress uniforms
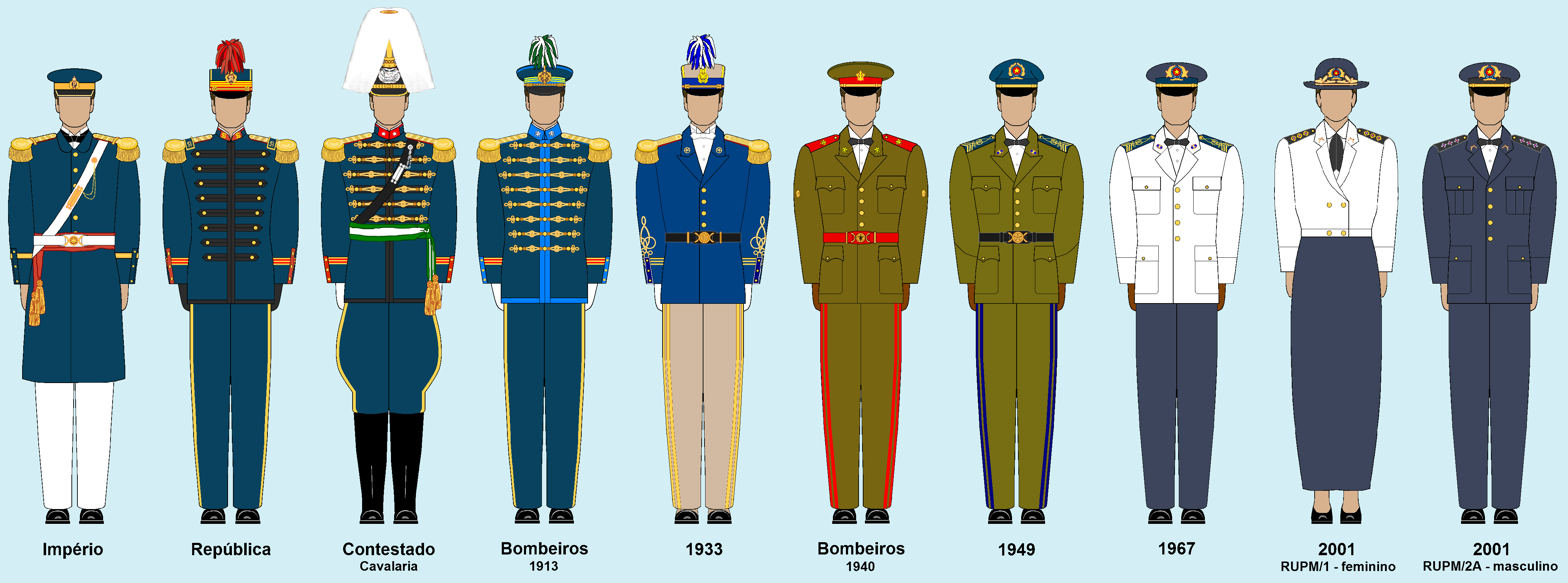

Battledress uniforms
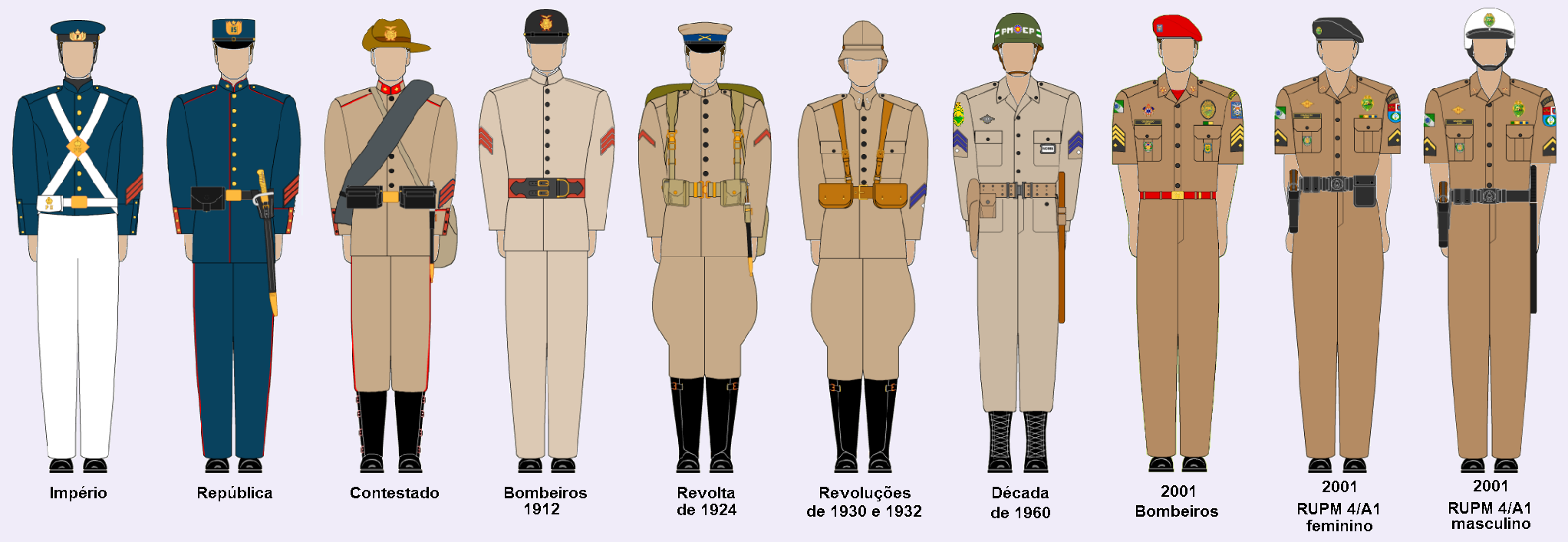

== Ranks ==
The PMPR has the same hierarchical classification of the Brazilian Army, with another type of insignias.

Officers

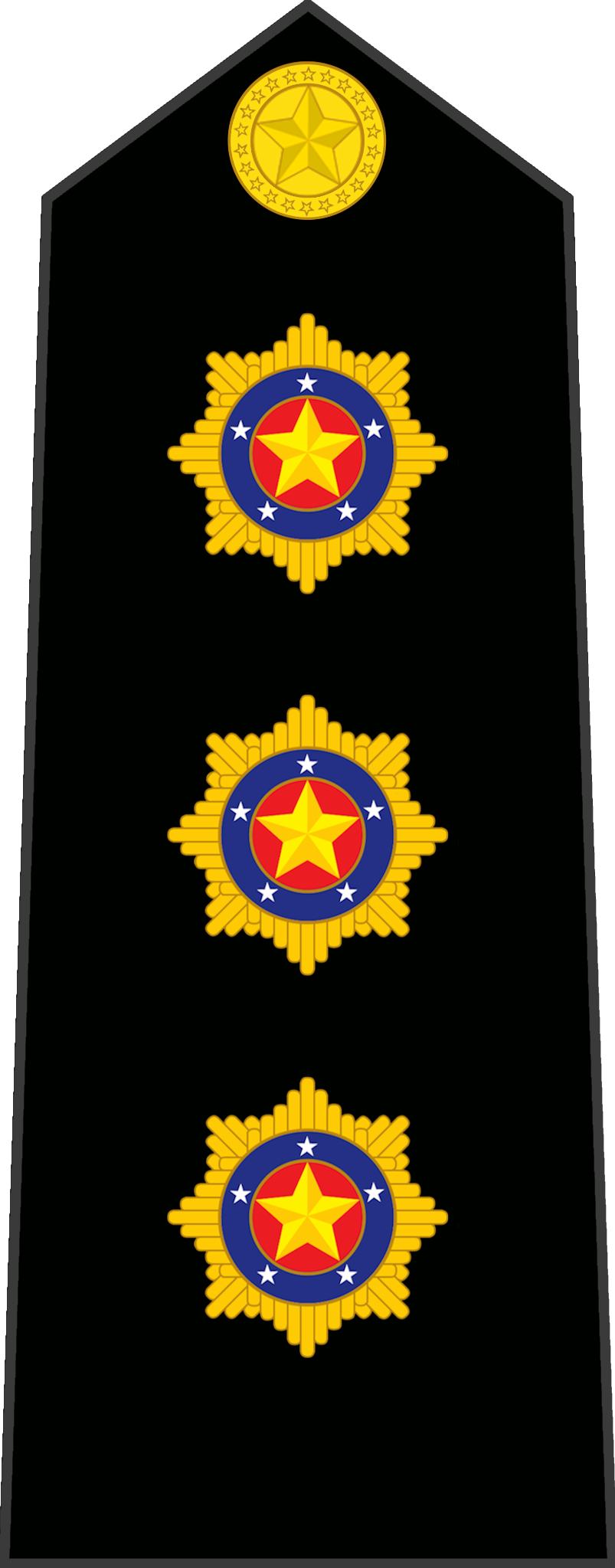
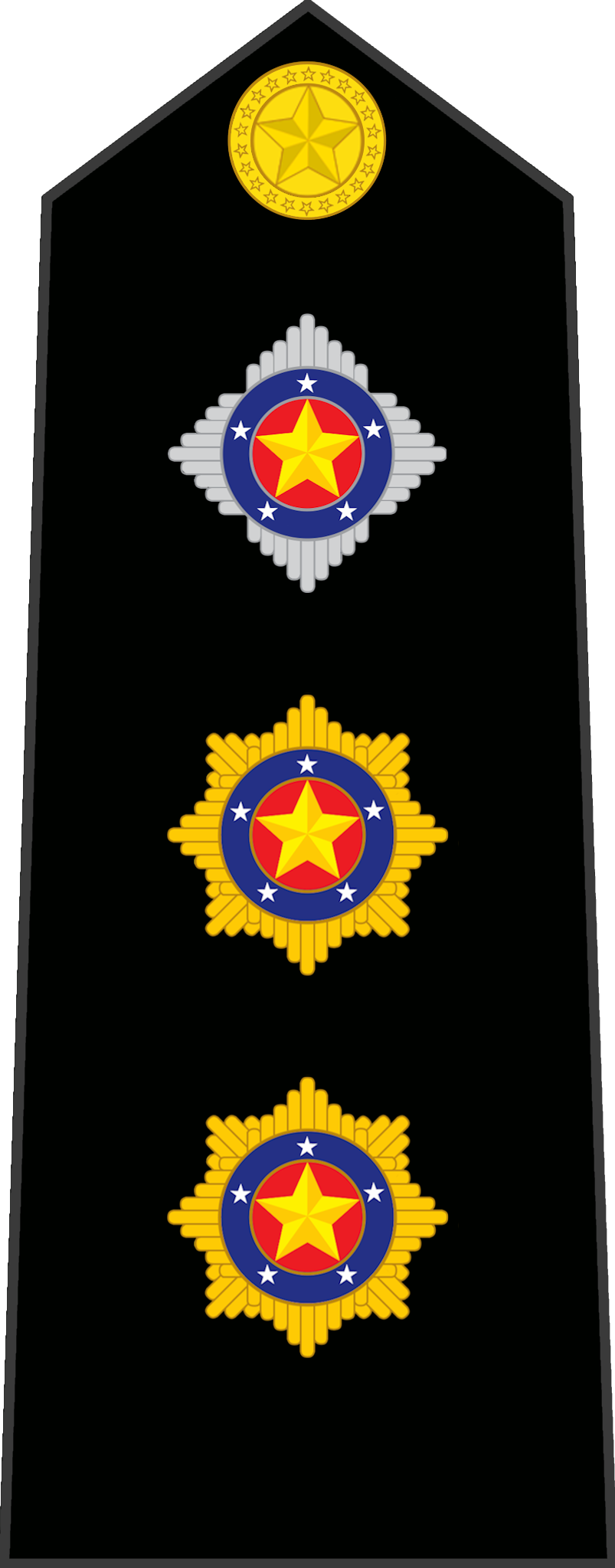
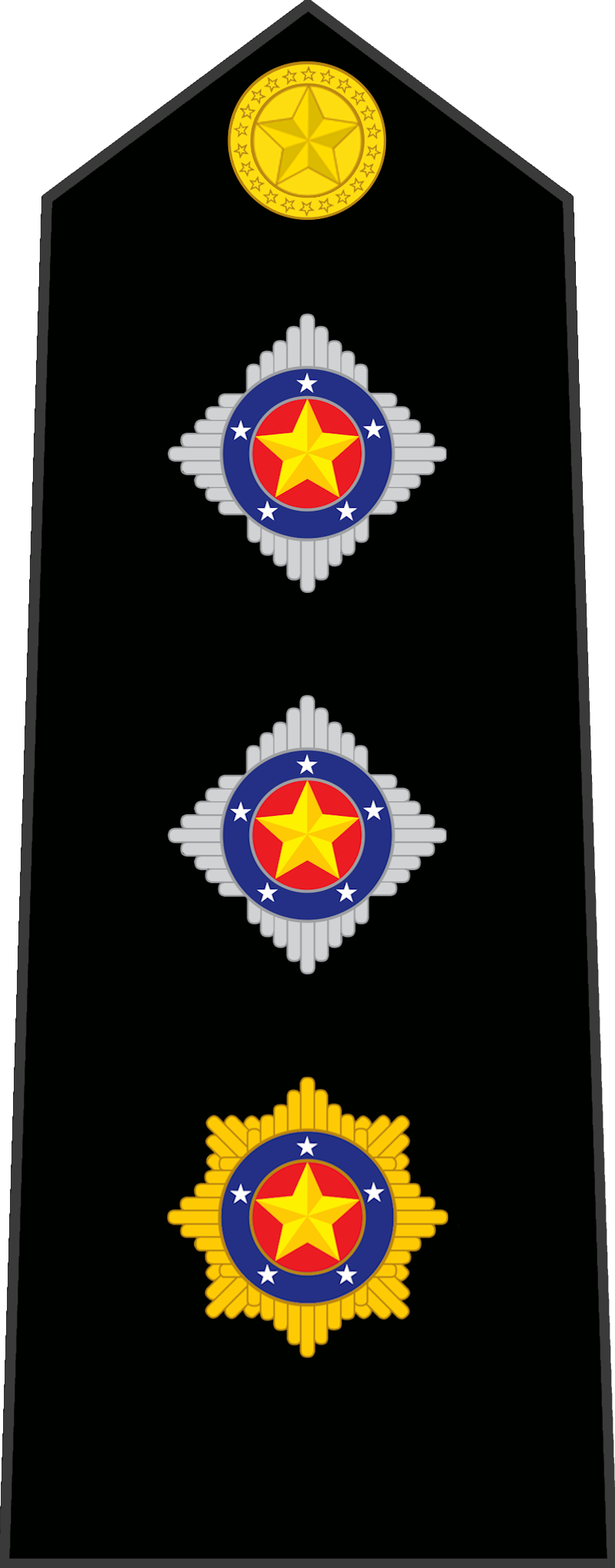
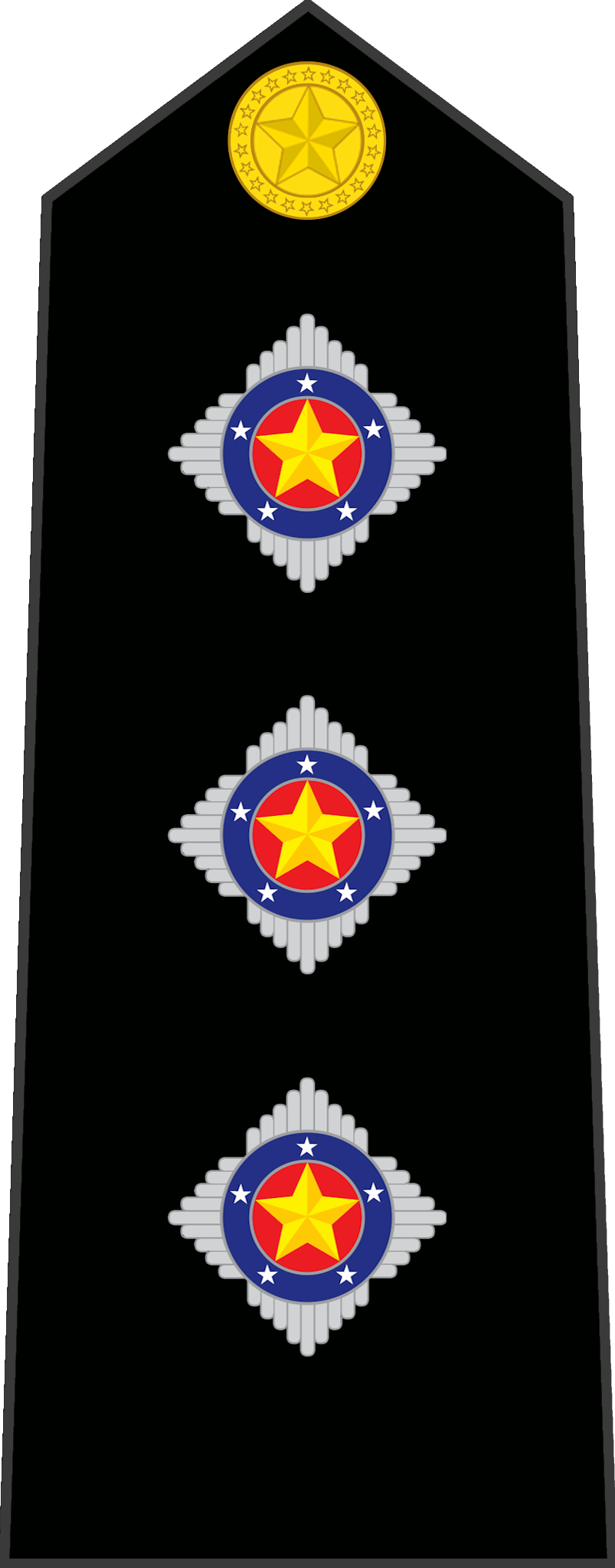
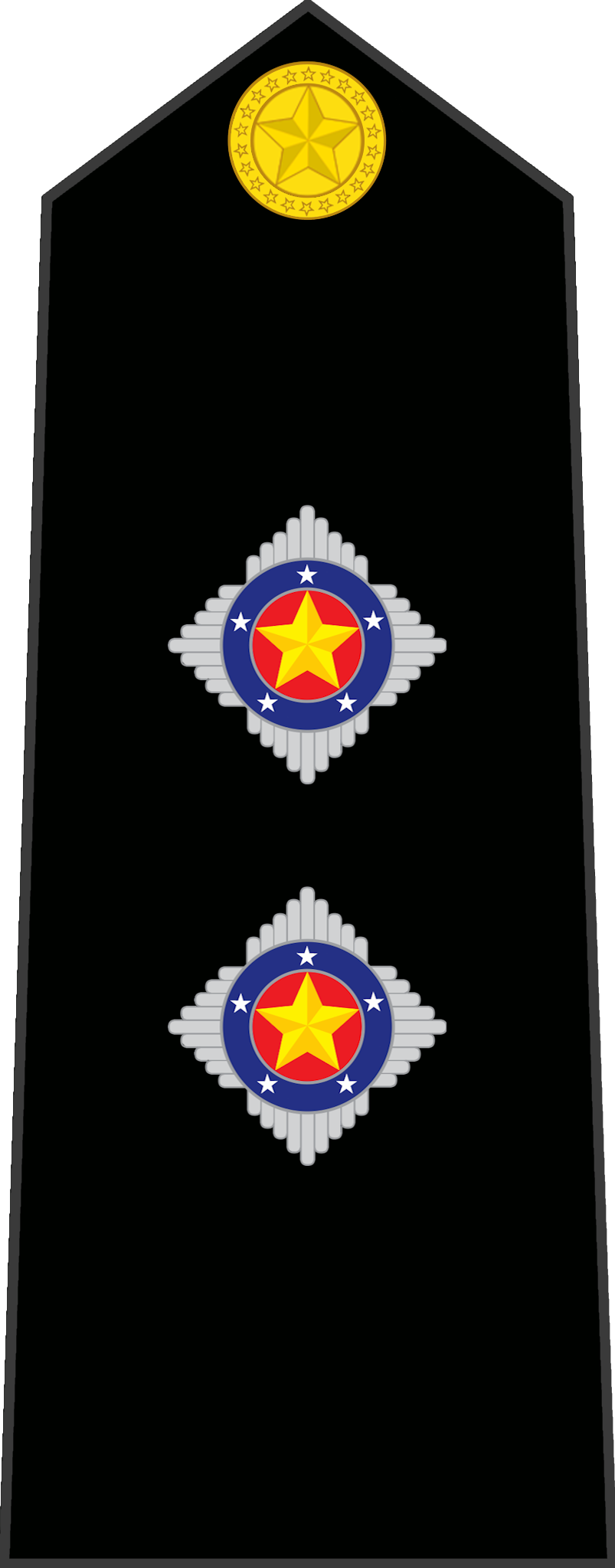
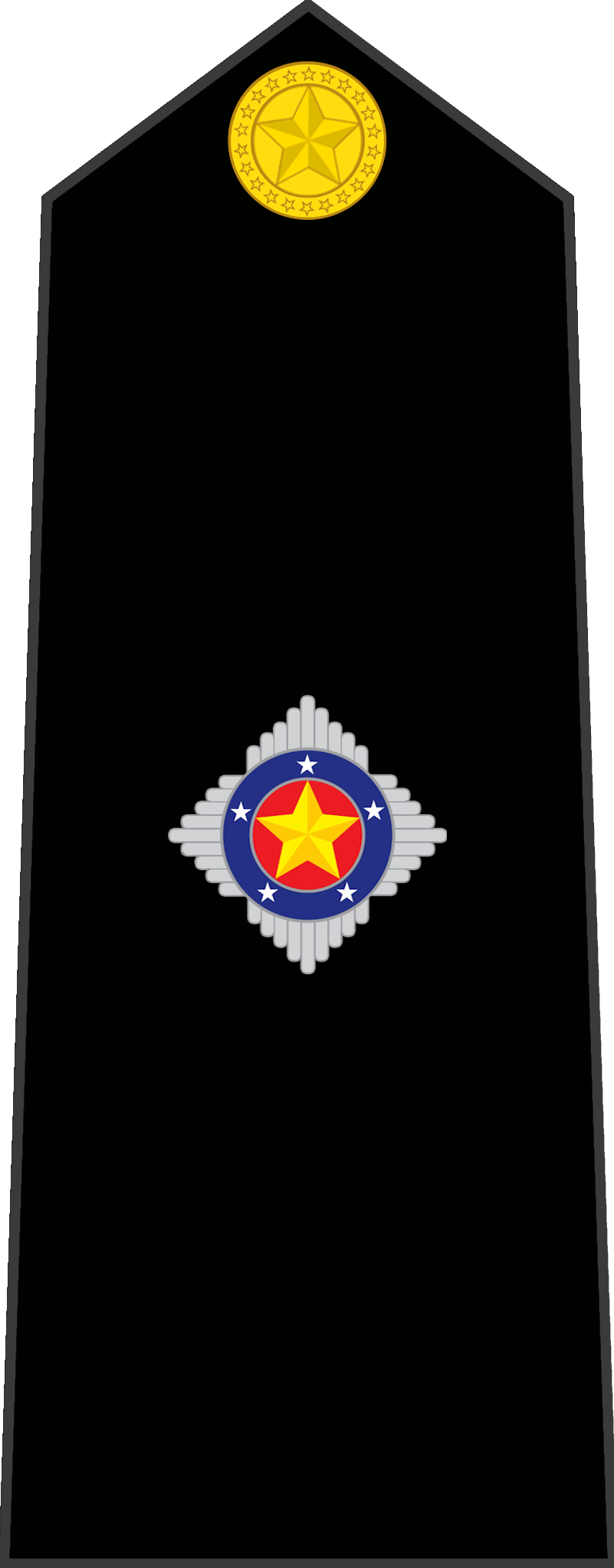
| Rank group | General / flag officers | Senior officers | | | Junior officers |
|---|---|---|---|---|---|---|---|
| Brazilian Military Police |
| Brazilian Military Police | | Coronel | Tenente-coronel | Major | Capitão | Primeiro tenente | Segundo tenente |

Enlisted

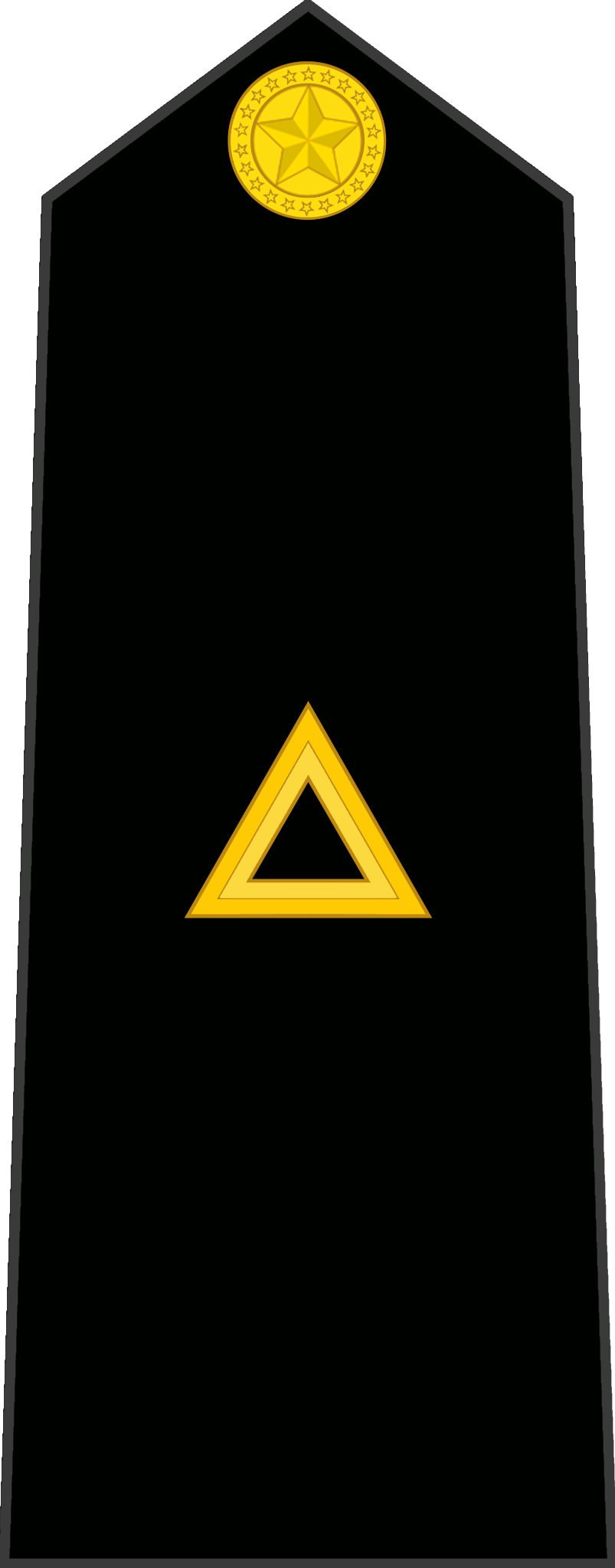
| Rank group | Senior NCOs | | | | Junior NCOs | Enlisted |
|---|---|---|---|---|---|---|---|
| Brazilian Military Police |
| Brazilian Military Police | Subtenente | Primeiro-sargento | Segundo-sargento | Terceiro-sargento | Cabo | Soldado primeira classe | Soldado segunda classe |

== See also ==
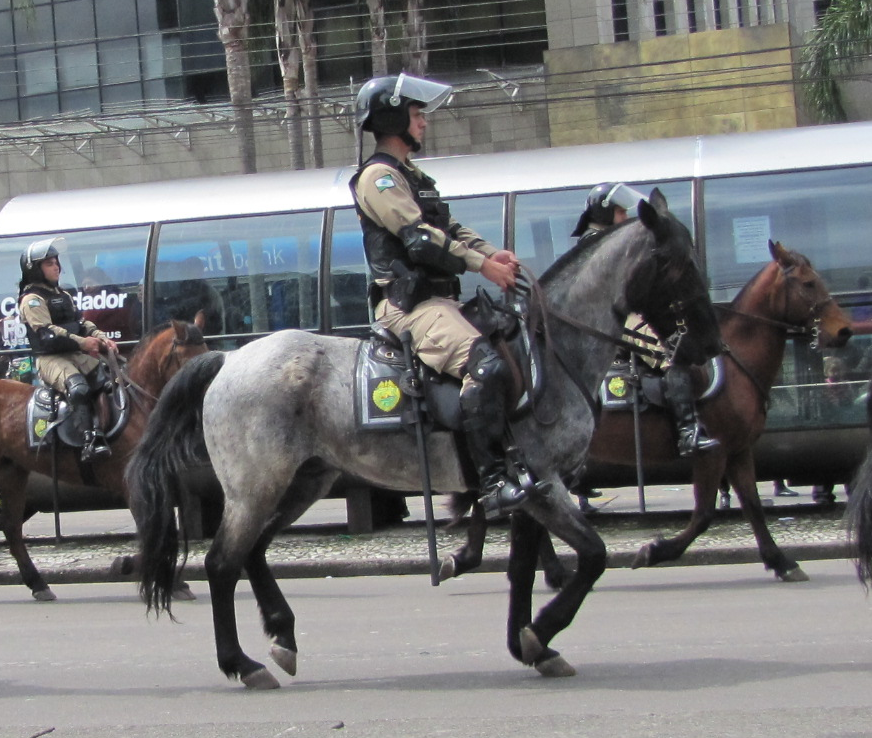
Mounted police of PMPR - 2010.

- Paraná State
- Military Police of Brazil
- Battalion of Special Operations
- Brazilian Armed Forces
- Military Police
- Gendarmerie

== Sources ==
- Campanha do Contestado - Volume 1, 2 e 3; de Demerval Peixoto; Edição Farol do Saber - Prefeitura Municipal de Curitiba; 1995.
- De Catanduvas ao Oiapoque; de Milton Ivan Heller; Instituto Histórico e Geográfico do Paraná; 2007; ISBN 85-7662-027-8.
- Episódios da História da PMPR - Volume I ao VII; do Capitão João Alves da Rosa Filho; Edição da Associação da Vila Militar; 2000.
- O Paraná na Guerra do Paraguai; de David Carneiro; Edição Farol do Saber - Prefeitura Municipal de Curitiba; 1995.
- O Paraná na História Militar do Brasil; de David Carneiro; Edição Farol do Saber - Prefeitura Municipal de Curitiba; 1995.
- Os Voluntários da Pátria na Guerra do Paraguai - Volume 2, Tomo I e IV; do General Paulo de Queiroz Duarte; Edição da Bibliex; 1983.
