= Battalion of Special Operations =

Brazilian police tactical unit

Battalion of Special Operations Military Police of Paraná
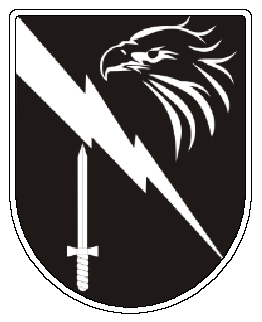
- Abbreviation: BOPE

Agency overview
- Formed: October 27, 1964

Jurisdictional structure
- Operations jurisdiction: Paraná, Brazil

Operational structure
- Headquarters: Curitiba

Website
- www.pmpr.pr.gov.br/BOPE

The Battalion of Special Operations (Portuguese: Batalhão de Operações Especiais - BOPE) is a unit of the Military Police of Paraná, Brazil. It is a police tactical unit in the State of Parana, trained to perform high-risk operations that fall outside of the abilities of regular officers.

== History ==
Originally the special operations of the Military Police of Paraná State was to anti-guerrilla warfare and operating in difficult to access terrain, but with the end of the Cold War it was transformed into tactical special operations of law enforcement.

== Duties ==
BOPE team members' duties include: anti-irregular military, combat patrol in urban areas to against serious criminal gangs, counter-sniper tactics, defusing and disposal of bombs, engaging heavily armed criminals, executive protection, operating in difficult to access terrain, high-risk tactical law enforcement situations, performing counterterrorism and hostage rescues operations, serving high risk arrest and search warrants, special reconnaissance, subduing barricaded suspects, and support crowd control and riot control.

== Organization ==
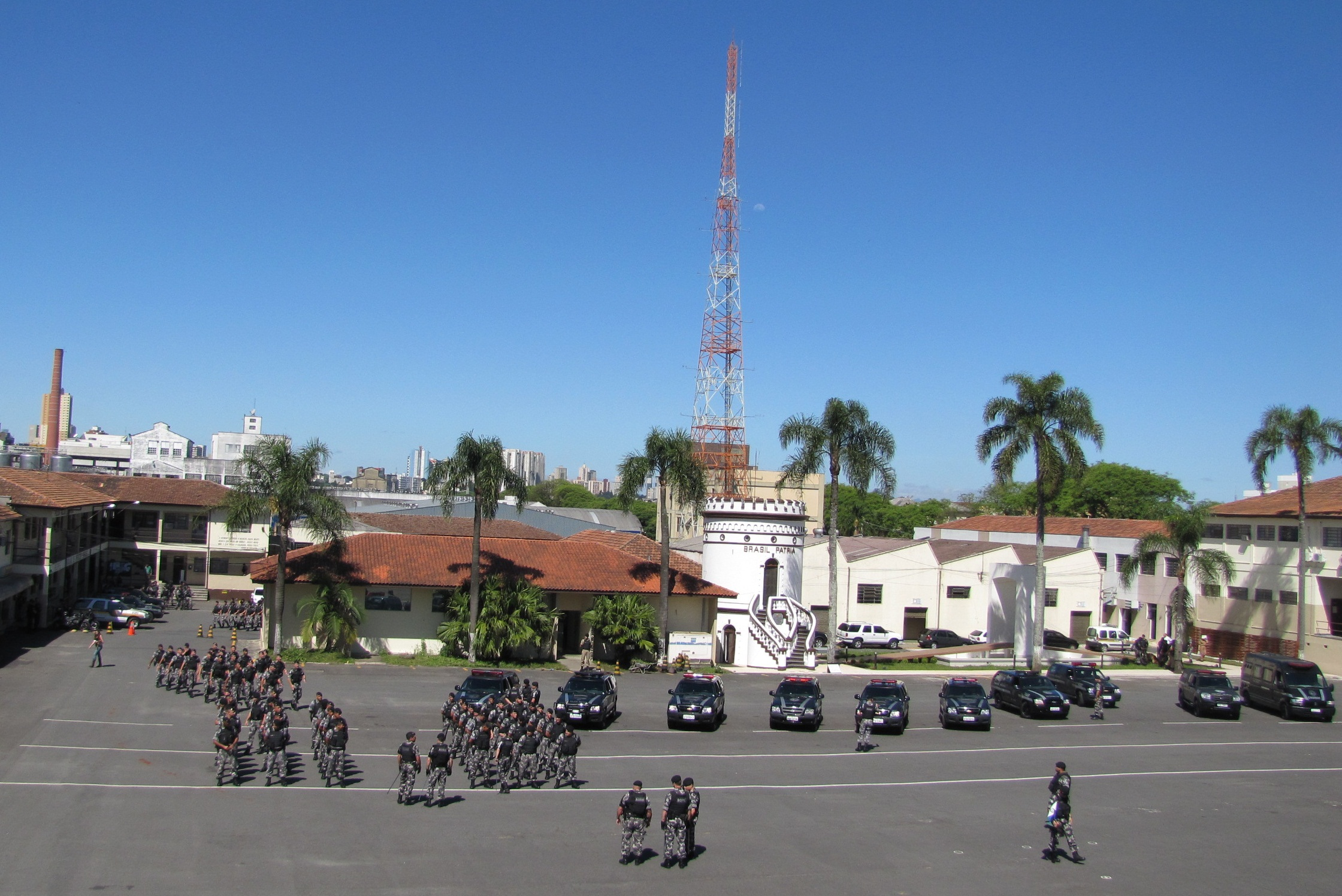
Parade of BOPE-PMPR.

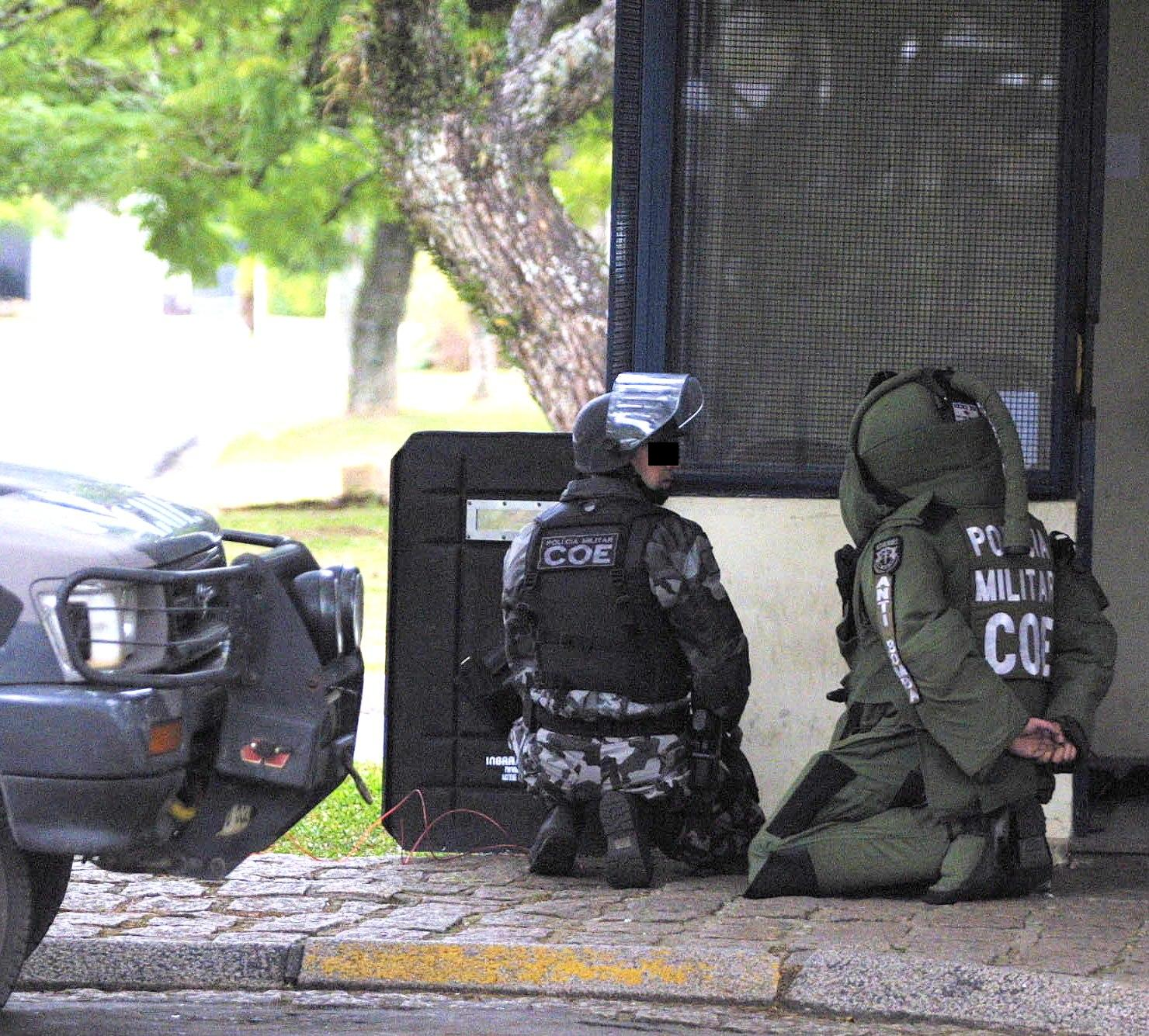
Bomb disposal squad of the BOPE-PMPR.

- 1st Company (special patrol)

1st Platoon of special patrol
2nd Platoon of special patrol

- 2nd Company (special patrol)

1st Platoon of special patrol
2nd Platoon of special patrol

- 3rd Company (riot control)

1st Platoon of riot control
2nd Platoon of riot control

- 4th Company (riot control)

1st Platoon of riot control
2nd Platoon of riot control

- 5th Company (special operation)

Team of tactical squad
Team of snipers squad
Team of bomb disposal squad

- 6th Company (Police dog)

1st Platoon of K-9
2nd Platoon of K-9

== Gear ==
BOPE teams are often equipped with specialized firearms including submachine guns, assault rifles, breaching shotguns, riot control agents, stun grenades, and sniper rifles.

They have specialized equipment including heavy body armor, ballistic shields, entry tools and advanced night vision optics.

Model	Origin	Type
Taurus PT 24/7	Brazil	Semi-automatic pistol
Taurus PT100	Brazil	Semi-automatic pistol
Taurus MT 40	Brazil	Submachine gun
Heckler & Koch MP5	Germany	Submachine gun
Pump CBC 12	Brazil	Shotgun
SPAS-15	Italy	Shotgun
IMBEL MD97	Brazil	Assault rifle
M4 carbine	United States	Assault rifle
Robar SR 90	United States	Sniper rifle

== Similar named police units of the Brazilian police force ==
BOE or BOPE are acronyms that can refer to the following specialized military police units:

BOE (Batalhão de Operações Especiais) units:

- Special Operations Battalion (PMAC) - in Acre
- Special Operations Battalion (PMDF) - in the Federal District
- Specials Battalion Operations (PMMT) - in the state of Mato Grosso
- Special Operations Battalion (PMPR) - the state of Paraná
- Special Operations Battalion (PMPI) - the state of Piauí
- Special Police Operations Battalion (PMRS) - in Rio Grande do Sul state

BOPE (Batalhão de Operações Policiais Especiais) units:

- Special Police Operations Battalion (PMAL) - the state of Alagoas
- Special Police Operations Battalion (PMRR) - in the state of Roraima
- Special Police Operations Battalion (PMSC) - the state of Santa Catarina
- Special Police Operations Battalion (PMERJ) - in the state of Rio de Janeiro
- Special Police Operations Battalion (PMRN) - in Rio Grande do Norte state

== See also ==
- Military Police (Brazil)
- Military Police of Paraná State
