= Ivaiporã =

Coordinates: 24°15′S 51°45′W

- Municipality
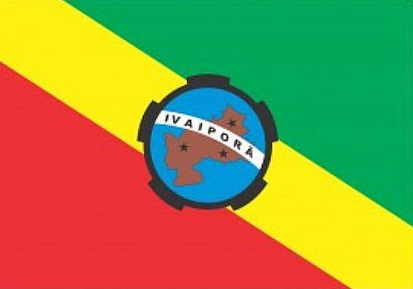
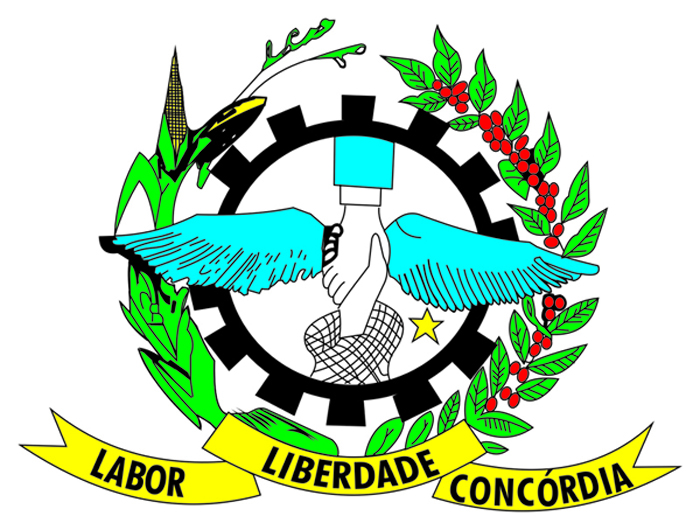
- Flag Coat of arms

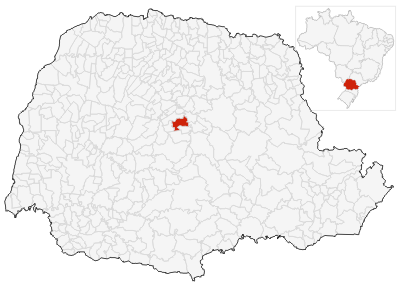
- Map of the state of Paraná showing the city of Ivaiporã in Brazil.
- Country: Brazil
- Region: Southern
- State: Paraná
- Mesoregion: Norte Central Paranaense

Population (2020)
  - Total: 31,935
- Time zone: UTC -3

Ivaiporã is a municipality in the state of Paraná in the Southern Region of Brazil.

== See also ==
- List of municipalities in Paraná
